= Scoparia pyraustoides =

Scientific classification
- Kingdom: Animalia
- Phylum: Arthropoda
- Class: Insecta
- Order: Lepidoptera
- Family: Crambidae
- Genus: Scoparia
- Species: S. pyraustoides

Binomial name
- Scoparia pyraustoides J. F. G. Clarke, 1965

Species of moth

Scoparia pyraustoides is a moth in the family Crambidae. It was described by John Frederick Gates Clarke in 1965. It is found on the Juan Fernandez Islands in Chile.
