= Scoparia subtersa =

Scientific classification
- Kingdom: Animalia
- Phylum: Arthropoda
- Class: Insecta
- Order: Lepidoptera
- Family: Crambidae
- Genus: Scoparia
- Species: S. subtersa

Binomial name
- Scoparia subtersa Dyar, 1929

Species of moth

Scoparia subtersa is a moth in the family Crambidae. It was described by Harrison Gray Dyar Jr. in 1929. It is found in Guatemala, Costa Rica, Mexico and Trinidad.

The wingspan is about 14 mm. The forewings are yellowish with pale lines. The hindwings are grey, with bown irrorations (speckles) and blotches. Adults have been recorded on wing in January.
