= Scoparia albipunctata =

Scientific classification
- Kingdom: Animalia
- Phylum: Arthropoda
- Class: Insecta
- Order: Lepidoptera
- Family: Crambidae
- Genus: Scoparia
- Species: S. albipunctata

Binomial name
- Scoparia albipunctata H. Druce, 1899

Species of moth

Scoparia albipunctata is a moth in the family Crambidae. It was described by Herbert Druce in 1899. It is found in Costa Rica and Guatemala.
