= Scoparia delicatalis =

Scientific classification
- Kingdom: Animalia
- Phylum: Arthropoda
- Class: Insecta
- Order: Lepidoptera
- Family: Crambidae
- Genus: Scoparia
- Species: S. delicatalis

Binomial name
- Scoparia delicatalis Walker, 1866

Species of moth

Scoparia delicatalis is a moth in the family Crambidae. It was described by Francis Walker in 1866. It is found in India (Hindustan).
