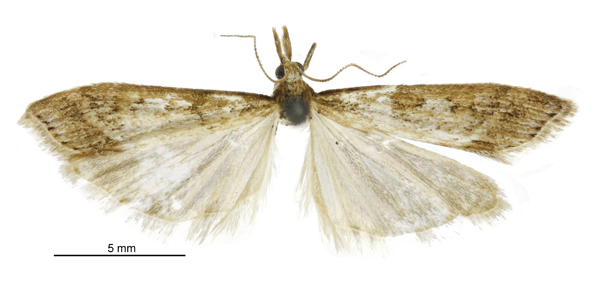
- Male
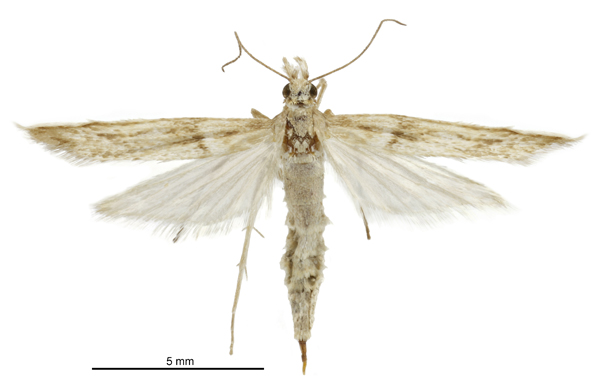
- Female

Scientific classification
- Kingdom: Animalia
- Phylum: Arthropoda
- Class: Insecta
- Order: Lepidoptera
- Family: Crambidae
- Genus: Scoparia
- Species: S. turneri

Binomial name
- Scoparia turneri Philpott, 1928

= Scoparia turneri =

Species of moth

Scoparia turneri is a species of moth in the family Crambidae. It is endemic to New Zealand.

== Taxonomy ==
It was described by Alfred Philpott in 1928. However the placement of this species within the genus Scoparia is in doubt. As a result, this species has also been referred to as Scoparia (s.l.) turneri.

== Description ==
The wingspan is 18–21 mm. The forewings are brown, irrorated with fuscous and white. The first line is white, margined with brown posteriorly. The second line and subterminal line are also white and there is a terminal series of black dots. The hindwings are ochreous-grey. Adults have been recorded on wing in February.
