= Scoparia albonigra =

Scientific classification
- Kingdom: Animalia
- Phylum: Arthropoda
- Clade: Pancrustacea
- Class: Insecta
- Order: Lepidoptera
- Family: Crambidae
- Genus: Scoparia
- Species: S. albonigra

Binomial name
- Scoparia albonigra Nuss, 2000

Species of moth

Scoparia albonigra is a moth in the family Crambidae. It was described by Nuss in 2000. It is found in Malawi.
