= Scoparia ischnoptera =

Scientific classification
- Kingdom: Animalia
- Phylum: Arthropoda
- Class: Insecta
- Order: Lepidoptera
- Family: Crambidae
- Genus: Scoparia
- Species: S. ischnoptera

Binomial name
- Scoparia ischnoptera Turner, 1922

Species of moth

Scoparia ischnoptera is a moth in the family Crambidae. It was described by Turner in 1922. It is found in Australia, where it has been recorded from Victoria.

The wingspan is about 20 mm. The forewings are dark-grey with a blackish streak from the base to the middle along the fold. There is a similar streak in the cell and there is some blackish subapical and subtornal suffusion. The hindwings whitish, with a slight grey-whitish suffusion towards the apex. Adults have been recorded on wing in April.
