= Scoparia aequipennalis =

Scientific classification
- Kingdom: Animalia
- Phylum: Arthropoda
- Class: Insecta
- Order: Lepidoptera
- Family: Crambidae
- Genus: Scoparia
- Species: S. aequipennalis

Binomial name
- Scoparia aequipennalis Warren, 1905

Species of moth

Scoparia aequipennalis is a species of moth in the family Crambidae. It is found on the Azores.

Its wingspan is about 16 mm. Its forewings are almost wholly suffused with blackish fuscous with two whitish lines. Its hindwings are dark fuscous. Adults have been recorded from March to May.
