= Scoparia plagiotis =

Scientific classification
- Kingdom: Animalia
- Phylum: Arthropoda
- Class: Insecta
- Order: Lepidoptera
- Family: Crambidae
- Genus: Scoparia
- Species: S. plagiotis

Binomial name
- Scoparia plagiotis Meyrick, 1887

Species of moth

Scoparia plagiotis is a moth in the family Crambidae. It is found in Australia, where it has been recorded from Tasmania.

The wingspan is 19–20 mm. The forewings are light grey, ochreous tinged and partially irrorated (sprinkled) with white. The veins are marked with black. The first line is cloudy, white and posteriorly blackish margined near the costa. The second line and the subterminal line are cloudy and white. The hindwings are whitish grey, the hindmargin somewhat darker. Adults have been recorded on wing in December.
