= Scoparia crypserythra =

Scientific classification
- Kingdom: Animalia
- Phylum: Arthropoda
- Class: Insecta
- Order: Lepidoptera
- Family: Crambidae
- Genus: Scoparia
- Species: S. crypserythra

Binomial name
- Scoparia crypserythra (Lower, 1901)

Synonyms
- Eclipsiodes crypserythra Lower, 1901

Species of moth

Scoparia crypserythra is a moth in the family Crambidae. It was described by Oswald Bertram Lower in 1901. It is found in Australia, where it has been recorded from New South Wales.

The wingspan is about 20 mm. The forewings are grey whitish, irrorated (sprinkled) with fuscous and with some reddish scales. The markings are fuscous. The hindwings are very pale ochreous, becoming light fuscous around the termen. Adults have been recorded on wing in July and August.
