= Scoparia hypoxantha =

Scientific classification
- Kingdom: Animalia
- Phylum: Arthropoda
- Class: Insecta
- Order: Lepidoptera
- Family: Crambidae
- Genus: Scoparia
- Species: S. hypoxantha

Binomial name
- Scoparia hypoxantha Lower, 1896

Species of moth

Scoparia hypoxantha is a moth in the family Crambidae. It was first described by Oswald Bertram Lower in 1896. It is found in Australia, where it has been recorded from South Australia and Victoria.
