= Scoparia graeca =

Scientific classification
- Kingdom: Animalia
- Phylum: Arthropoda
- Clade: Pancrustacea
- Class: Insecta
- Order: Lepidoptera
- Family: Crambidae
- Genus: Scoparia
- Species: S. graeca

Binomial name
- Scoparia graeca Nuss, 2005

Species of moth

Scoparia graeca is a species of moth in the family Crambidae. It is found in Greece.
