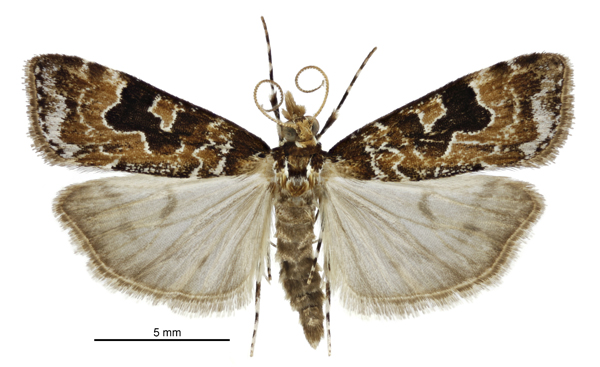
- Male
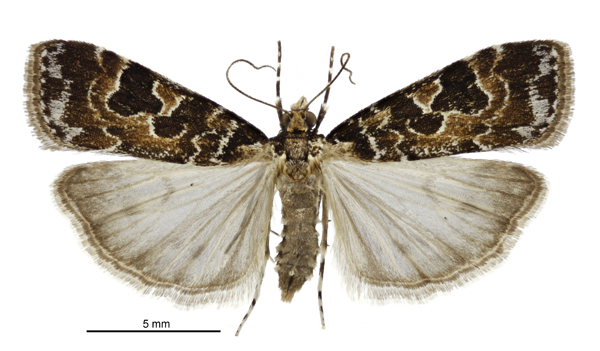
- Female

Scientific classification
- Kingdom: Animalia
- Phylum: Arthropoda
- Class: Insecta
- Order: Lepidoptera
- Family: Crambidae
- Genus: Scoparia
- Species: S. triscelis

Binomial name
- Scoparia triscelis Meyrick, 1909

= Scoparia triscelis =

Species of moth

Scoparia triscelis is a species of moth in the family Crambidae. It was described by Edward Meyrick in 1909. It is endemic to New Zealand.
