= Scoparia fakoensis =

Scientific classification
- Kingdom: Animalia
- Phylum: Arthropoda
- Class: Insecta
- Order: Lepidoptera
- Family: Crambidae
- Genus: Scoparia
- Species: S. fakoensis

Binomial name
- Scoparia fakoensis Maes, 1996

Species of moth

Scoparia fakoensis is a moth in the family Crambidae. It was described by Koen V. N. Maes in 1996. It is found in Cameroon.
