= Scoparia brunnea =

Scientific classification
- Kingdom: Animalia
- Phylum: Arthropoda
- Class: Insecta
- Order: Lepidoptera
- Family: Crambidae
- Genus: Scoparia
- Species: S. brunnea

Binomial name
- Scoparia brunnea (Leraut, 1986)

Synonyms
- Sineudonia brunnea Leraut, 1986; Sineudonia brunnea hoenei Leraut, 1986

Species of moth

Scoparia brunnea is a moth in the family Crambidae. It was described by Patrice J.A. Leraut in 1986. It is found in the Chinese provinces of Fujian and Yunnan.

== Subspecies ==
- Sineudonia brunnea brunnea (Fujian)
- Scoparia brunnea hoenei (P. Leraut, 1986) (Yunnan)
