= Scoparia normalis =

Scientific classification
- Kingdom: Animalia
- Phylum: Arthropoda
- Class: Insecta
- Order: Lepidoptera
- Family: Crambidae
- Genus: Scoparia
- Species: S. normalis

Binomial name
- Scoparia normalis Dyar, 1904

Species of moth

Scoparia normalis is a moth in the family Crambidae. It was described by Harrison Gray Dyar Jr. in 1904. It has been recorded from the US states of Arizona, Colorado, New Mexico, North Carolina and Utah.

The wingspan is about 26 mm. The forewings are pale gray with a black shade at the base. The inner line is dark, thickened on the costal two-thirds by a broad black bar. The outer line is pale, narrowly black shaded within. The terminal area is irregularly black shaded. There is a row of black terminal points. The hindwings are dirty whitish, darkest along the outer margin. Adults have been recorded on wing from July to September.
