= Scoparia semiamplalis =

Scientific classification
- Kingdom: Animalia
- Phylum: Arthropoda
- Class: Insecta
- Order: Lepidoptera
- Family: Crambidae
- Genus: Scoparia
- Species: S. semiamplalis

Binomial name
- Scoparia semiamplalis Warren, 1905

Species of moth

Scoparia semiamplalis is a species of moth in the family Crambidae. It is found on the Azores.

The wingspan is about 16 mm. The forewings are whitish with distinct black markings. The hindwings are semi-hyaline greyish white, but become darker grey toward the apex.
