= Scoparia lativitta =

Scientific classification
- Kingdom: Animalia
- Phylum: Arthropoda
- Class: Insecta
- Order: Lepidoptera
- Family: Crambidae
- Genus: Scoparia
- Species: S. lativitta

Binomial name
- Scoparia lativitta (Moore, 1883)

Synonyms
- Eudorea lativitta Moore, 1883

Species of moth

Scoparia lativitta is a moth in the family Crambidae. It was described by Frederic Moore in 1883. It is found in Darjeeling, India.
