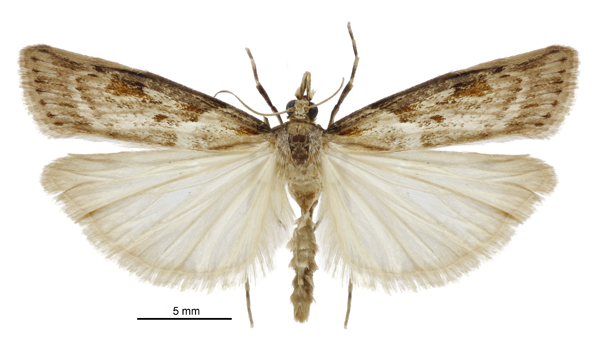
- Male

Scientific classification
- Kingdom: Animalia
- Phylum: Arthropoda
- Class: Insecta
- Order: Lepidoptera
- Family: Crambidae
- Genus: Scoparia
- Species: S. dryphactis

Binomial name
- Scoparia dryphactis Meyrick, 1911

= Scoparia dryphactis =

Species of moth

Scoparia dryphactis is a moth in the family Crambidae. It was described by Edward Meyrick in 1911. This species is endemic to New Zealand.

The wingspan is 30–31 mm. The forewings are pale ochreous, tinged with brownish or mixed with light fuscous and somewhat sprinkled with dark fuscous on the veins. There is a broad streak of dark-fuscous suffusion along the costa, as well as a short ferruginous streak from the base on the fold which is surrounded with dark-fuscous suffusion. The lines are cloudy, pale and edged with fuscous suffusion. The hindwings are whitish-ochreous, tinged with grey. Adults have been recorded on wing in February.
