= Scoparia albifrons =

Scientific classification
- Kingdom: Animalia
- Phylum: Arthropoda
- Class: Insecta
- Order: Lepidoptera
- Family: Crambidae
- Genus: Scoparia
- Species: S. albifrons

Binomial name
- Scoparia albifrons H. Druce, 1896

Species of moth

Scoparia albifrons is a moth in the family Crambidae. It was described by Herbert Druce in 1896. It is found in Colombia.
