= Scoparia polialis =

Scientific classification
- Kingdom: Animalia
- Phylum: Arthropoda
- Class: Insecta
- Order: Lepidoptera
- Family: Crambidae
- Genus: Scoparia
- Species: S. polialis

Binomial name
- Scoparia polialis Hampson, 1903

Species of moth

Scoparia polialis is a moth in the family Crambidae. It was described by George Hampson in 1903. It is known from India's Khasi Hills.
