= Scoparia eumeles =

Scientific classification
- Kingdom: Animalia
- Phylum: Arthropoda
- Class: Insecta
- Order: Lepidoptera
- Family: Crambidae
- Genus: Scoparia
- Species: S. eumeles

Binomial name
- Scoparia eumeles Meyrick, 1885

Species of moth

Scoparia eumeles is a moth in the family Crambidae. It was described by Edward Meyrick in 1885. It is found in Australia, where it has been recorded from New South Wales.

The wingspan is 14–16 mm. The forewings are very pale whitish ochreous, finely irrorated (speckled) with fuscous on the basal third and with blackish on the remainder of the wing. There is a faint blackish triangle on the base of the costa. The hindwings are pale whitish ochreous. Adults have been recorded on wing in April.
