= Scoparia atricuprea =

Scientific classification
- Kingdom: Animalia
- Phylum: Arthropoda
- Class: Insecta
- Order: Lepidoptera
- Family: Crambidae
- Genus: Scoparia
- Species: S. atricuprea

Binomial name
- Scoparia atricuprea Hampson, 1917

Species of moth

Scoparia atricuprea is a moth in the family Crambidae. It was described by George Hampson in 1917. It is found in South America (including Colombia) and on the Antilles (including Jamaica).

The wingspan is 16–20 mm. The forewings are black-brown with a cupreous gloss and irrorated with bluish white scales. The antemedial line is white and there is a minute white spot in the middle of the cell and an obscure band of blue-white irroration beyond it. The postmedial line is blue-white and there is a blue-white subapical patch and a series of dark cupreous brown spots before a slight waved white terminal line. The hindwings are white tinged with reddish brown, especially on the terminal area.
