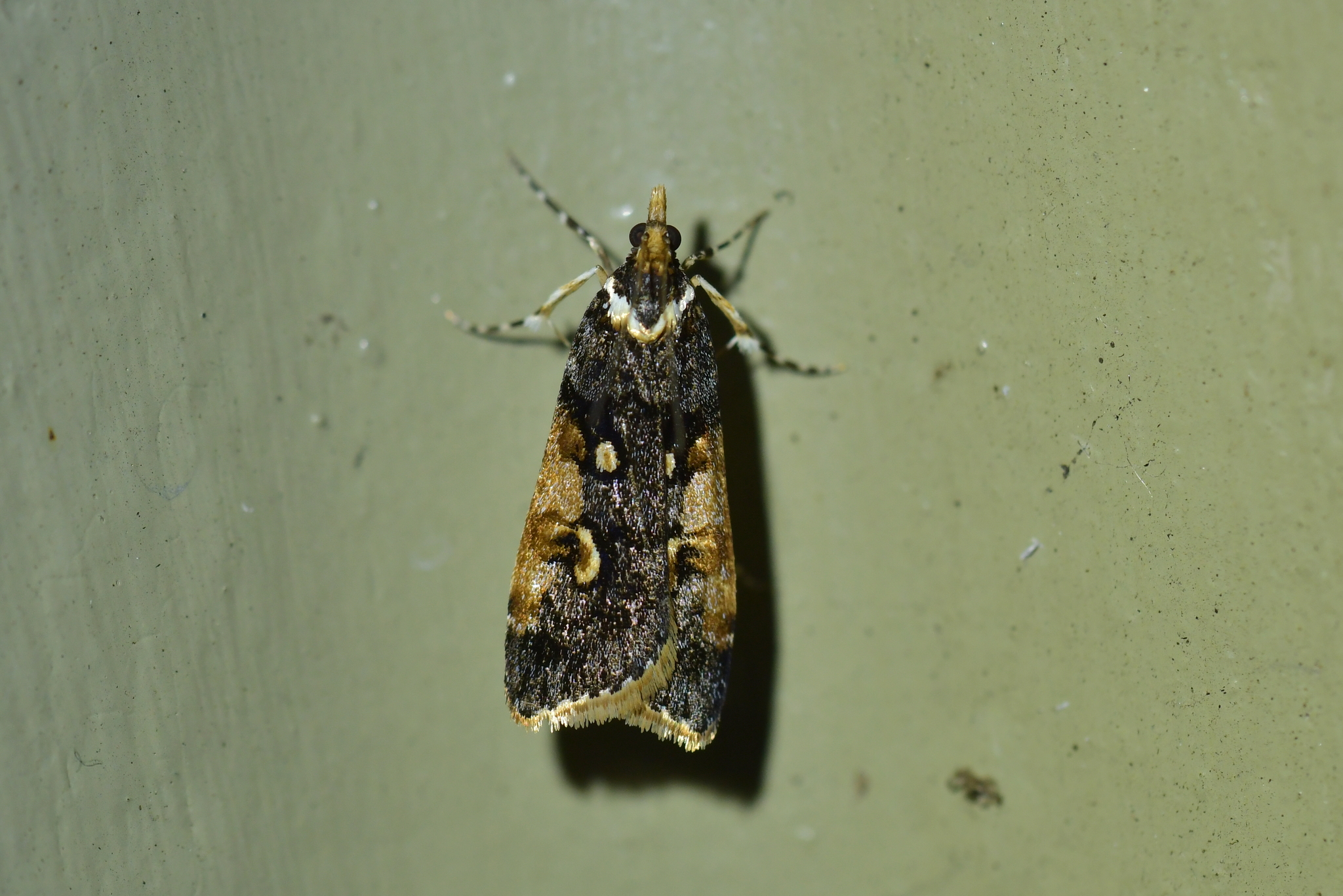

Scientific classification
- Kingdom: Animalia
- Phylum: Arthropoda
- Class: Insecta
- Order: Lepidoptera
- Family: Crambidae
- Genus: Scoparia
- Species: S. phalerias

Binomial name
- Scoparia phalerias Meyrick, 1905

= Scoparia phalerias =

Species of moth

Scoparia phalerias is a species of moth in the family Crambidae. It is endemic to New Zealand.

== Taxonomy ==
This species was described by Edward Meyrick in 1905. However the placement of this species within the genus Scoparia is in doubt. As a result, this species has also been referred to as Scoparia (s.l.) phalerias.
