= Scoparia apachealis =

Scientific classification
- Kingdom: Animalia
- Phylum: Arthropoda
- Class: Insecta
- Order: Lepidoptera
- Family: Crambidae
- Genus: Scoparia
- Species: S. apachealis

Binomial name
- Scoparia apachealis Munroe, 1972

Species of moth

Scoparia apachealis is a moth in the family Crambidae. It was described by Eugene G. Munroe in 1972. It is found in North America, where it has been recorded from Arizona, New Mexico and Utah.

== Subspecies ==
- Scoparia apachealis apachealis (Arizona)
- Scoparia apachealis pinalensis Munroe, 1972 (Arizona)
- Scoparia apachealis utalis Munroe, 1972 (Utah)
