= Scoparia philonephes =

Scientific classification
- Kingdom: Animalia
- Phylum: Arthropoda
- Class: Insecta
- Order: Lepidoptera
- Family: Crambidae
- Genus: Scoparia
- Species: S. philonephes

Binomial name
- Scoparia philonephes (Meyrick, 1885)

Synonyms
- Xeroscopa philonephes Meyrick, 1885

Species of moth

Scoparia philonephes is a moth in the family Crambidae. It is found in Australia, where it has been recorded from Victoria and South Australia.

The wingspan is about 31 mm. The forewings are dark fuscous grey, irrorated (sprinkled) with white and with a few black scales. The first line is whitish and obscurely dark margined posteriorly. The second line is white and obscurely dark margined. The hindwings are very pale whitish ochreous, tinged with greyish. The apex and upper part of the hindmargin are narrowly grey. Adults have been recorded on wing in December.
