= Scoparia albifusalis =

Scientific classification
- Kingdom: Animalia
- Phylum: Arthropoda
- Class: Insecta
- Order: Lepidoptera
- Family: Crambidae
- Genus: Scoparia
- Species: S. albifusalis

Binomial name
- Scoparia albifusalis Hampson, 1907

Species of moth

Scoparia albifusalis is a moth in the family Crambidae. It was described by George Hampson in 1907. It is found in Sri Lanka.
