= Scoparia platymera =

Scientific classification
- Kingdom: Animalia
- Phylum: Arthropoda
- Class: Insecta
- Order: Lepidoptera
- Family: Crambidae
- Genus: Scoparia
- Species: S. platymera

Binomial name
- Scoparia platymera Lower, 1905

Species of moth

Scoparia platymera is a moth in the family Crambidae described by Oswald Bertram Lower in 1905. It is found in Australia, where it has been recorded from Tasmania.

The wingspan is about 20 mm. The forewings are whitish and with fuscous markings. There is a row of blackish elongate streaks along the termen. The hindwings are pale greyish, tinged with fuscous along the termen on the upper half.
