= Scoparia juldusellus =

Scientific classification
- Kingdom: Animalia
- Phylum: Arthropoda
- Class: Insecta
- Order: Lepidoptera
- Family: Crambidae
- Genus: Scoparia
- Species: S. juldusellus

Binomial name
- Scoparia juldusellus (Caradja, 1916)

Synonyms
- Crambus juldusellus Caradja, 1916

Species of moth

Scoparia juldusellus is a moth in the family Crambidae. It was described by Aristide Caradja in 1916. It is found in Xinjiang, China.
