= Scoparia charopoea =

Scientific classification
- Kingdom: Animalia
- Phylum: Arthropoda
- Class: Insecta
- Order: Lepidoptera
- Family: Crambidae
- Genus: Scoparia
- Species: S. charopoea

Binomial name
- Scoparia charopoea Turner, 1908

Species of moth

Scoparia charopoea is a moth in the family Crambidae. It was described by Turner in 1908. It is found in Australia, where it has been recorded from Queensland.
