= Scoparia palloralis =

Scientific classification
- Kingdom: Animalia
- Phylum: Arthropoda
- Class: Insecta
- Order: Lepidoptera
- Family: Crambidae
- Genus: Scoparia
- Species: S. palloralis

Binomial name
- Scoparia palloralis Dyar, 1906

Synonyms
- Scoparia basalis ab. obispalis Dyar, 1906; Scoparia cervalis McDunnough, 1927

Species of moth

Scoparia palloralis is a moth in the family Crambidae. It was described by Harrison Gray Dyar Jr. in 1906. It is found in North America, where it has been recorded from British Columbia to southern California, Colorado and western Texas.

The length of the forewings is 5–9 mm. The forewings are tinged with brown and have inconspicuous maculation (spots). Adults are on wing from April to June in California and from July to August in Arizona.
