= Scoparia submedinella =

Scientific classification
- Kingdom: Animalia
- Phylum: Arthropoda
- Class: Insecta
- Order: Lepidoptera
- Family: Crambidae
- Genus: Scoparia
- Species: S. submedinella

Binomial name
- Scoparia submedinella Caradja, 1927

Species of moth

Scoparia submedinella is a moth in the family Crambidae. It was described by Aristide Caradja in 1927. It is found in Sichuan, China.
