= Scoparia alticola =

Scientific classification
- Kingdom: Animalia
- Phylum: Arthropoda
- Class: Insecta
- Order: Lepidoptera
- Family: Crambidae
- Genus: Scoparia
- Species: S. alticola

Binomial name
- Scoparia alticola Meyrick, 1935

Species of moth

Scoparia alticola is a moth in the family Crambidae. It was described by Edward Meyrick in 1935. It is found in the Democratic Republic of the Congo (Orientale) and Uganda.
