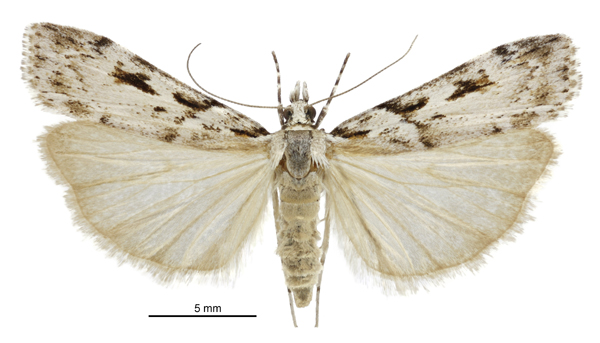
- Female

Scientific classification
- Kingdom: Animalia
- Phylum: Arthropoda
- Class: Insecta
- Order: Lepidoptera
- Family: Crambidae
- Genus: Scoparia
- Species: S. astragalota

Binomial name
- Scoparia astragalota (Meyrick, 1884)

Synonyms
- Xeroscopa astragalota Meyrick, 1884

= Scoparia astragalota =

Species of moth

Scoparia astragalota is a species of moth in the family Crambidae. This species is endemic to New Zealand.

== Taxonomy ==
This species was named by Edward Meyrick in 1884 as Xeroscopa astragalota. Meyrick gave a description of the species in 1885. Meyrick placed this species within the genus Scopaira in 1913. However the placement of this species within Scoparia is in doubt. As a result, this species has also been referred to as Scoparia (s.l.) astragalota.

== Description ==
The wingspan is about 27 mm. The forewings are light ochreous, suffused with white and with black markings, as well as suffused with reddish fuscous. The hindwings are pale whitish-grey, tinged with ochreous. The lunule, postmedian line and apex are greyer. Adults have been recorded on wing in December and January.
