= Scoparia crucigera =

Scientific classification
- Kingdom: Animalia
- Phylum: Arthropoda
- Class: Insecta
- Order: Lepidoptera
- Family: Crambidae
- Genus: Scoparia
- Species: S. crucigera

Binomial name
- Scoparia crucigera Gerasimov, 1930

Species of moth

Scoparia crucigera is a moth in the family Crambidae. It was described by Aleksey Maksimovich Gerasimov in 1930. It is found in Uzbekistan.
