= Scoparia tritocirrha =

Scientific classification
- Kingdom: Animalia
- Phylum: Arthropoda
- Class: Insecta
- Order: Lepidoptera
- Family: Crambidae
- Genus: Scoparia
- Species: S. tritocirrha

Binomial name
- Scoparia tritocirrha Turner, 1918

Species of moth

Scoparia tritocirrha is a moth in the family Crambidae. It was described by Alfred Jefferis Turner in 1918. It is found in Australia, where it has been recorded from Norfolk Island.

The wingspan is about 14 mm. The forewings are grey with a short longitudinal pale-yellowish line, edged with blackish. There is a broader yellowish longitudinal line before the middle beneath the cell, this line is also edged with blackish. There is a narrowly oval longitudinal yellowish median spot beyond the middle, edged with blackish and there are blackish dots on the costa. The hindwings are pale grey.
