= Scoparia rufostigma =

Scientific classification
- Kingdom: Animalia
- Phylum: Arthropoda
- Class: Insecta
- Order: Lepidoptera
- Family: Crambidae
- Genus: Scoparia
- Species: S. rufostigma

Binomial name
- Scoparia rufostigma Hampson, 1891

Species of moth

Scoparia rufostigma is a moth in the family Crambidae. It was described by George Hampson in 1891. It is found in India's Nilgiri Mountains.
