= Scoparia biscutella =

Scientific classification
- Kingdom: Animalia
- Phylum: Arthropoda
- Clade: Pancrustacea
- Class: Insecta
- Order: Lepidoptera
- Family: Crambidae
- Genus: Scoparia
- Species: S. biscutella

Binomial name
- Scoparia biscutella Zeller, 1872

Species of moth

Scoparia biscutella is a moth in the family Crambidae. It was described by Zeller in 1872. It is found in Colombia.
