= Scoparia axiolecta =

Scientific classification
- Kingdom: Animalia
- Phylum: Arthropoda
- Class: Insecta
- Order: Lepidoptera
- Family: Crambidae
- Genus: Scoparia
- Species: S. axiolecta

Binomial name
- Scoparia axiolecta Turner, 1922

Species of moth

Scoparia axiolecta is a moth in the family Crambidae. It was described by Turner in 1922. It is found in Australia, where it has been recorded from Tasmania.

The wingspan is 18 mm. The forewings are white with blackish markings and slight blackish irroration. The hindwings are whitish-grey.
