= Scoparia distictalis =

Scientific classification
- Kingdom: Animalia
- Phylum: Arthropoda
- Class: Insecta
- Order: Lepidoptera
- Family: Crambidae
- Genus: Scoparia
- Species: S. distictalis

Binomial name
- Scoparia distictalis (Hampson, 1908)

Synonyms
- Micraglossa distictalis Hampson, 1908

Species of moth

Scoparia distictalis is a moth in the family Crambidae. It was described by George Hampson in 1908. It is found in Sri Lanka.
