= Scoparia dispersa =

Scientific classification
- Kingdom: Animalia
- Phylum: Arthropoda
- Class: Insecta
- Order: Lepidoptera
- Family: Crambidae
- Genus: Scoparia
- Species: S. dispersa

Binomial name
- Scoparia dispersa Butler, 1883

Species of moth

Scoparia dispersa is a moth in the family Crambidae. It was described by Arthur Gardiner Butler in 1883. It is found in Chile.
