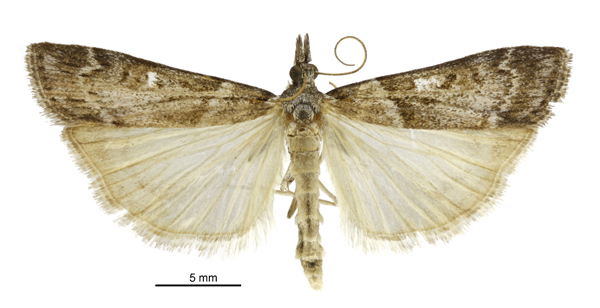
- Male

Scientific classification
- Kingdom: Animalia
- Phylum: Arthropoda
- Class: Insecta
- Order: Lepidoptera
- Family: Crambidae
- Genus: Scoparia
- Species: S. declivis

Binomial name
- Scoparia declivis Philpott, 1918

= Scoparia declivis =

Species of moth

Scoparia declivis is a species of moth in the family Crambidae. It is endemic to New Zealand.

== Taxonomy ==
Scoparia declivis was described by Alfred Philpott in 1918. However the placement of this species within the genus Scoparia is in doubt. As a result, this species has also been referred to as Scoparia (s.l.) declivis.

== Description ==
The wingspan is 28–32 mm. The forewings are fuscous-brown, irrorated with white. The basal area is pale up to the first line. This first line is whitish. The hindwings are pale whitish-ochreous. Adults have been recorded on wing in February.
