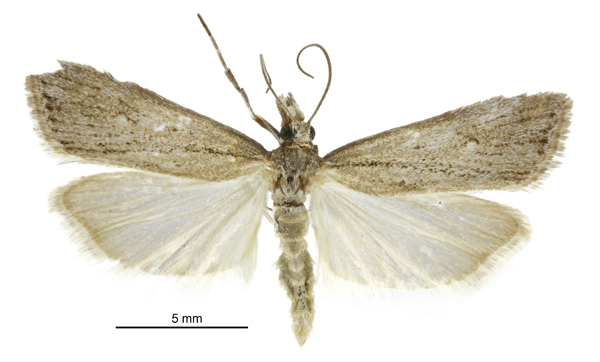
- Male

Scientific classification
- Kingdom: Animalia
- Phylum: Arthropoda
- Class: Insecta
- Order: Lepidoptera
- Family: Crambidae
- Genus: Scoparia
- Species: S. pallidula

Binomial name
- Scoparia pallidula Philpott, 1928

= Scoparia pallidula =

Species of moth

Scoparia pallidula is a moth in the Crambidae family. It is endemic to New Zealand.

== Taxonomy ==
This species was described by Alfred Philpott in 1928. However, the placement of this species within the genus Scoparia is in doubt. As a result, this species has also been referred to as Scoparia (s.l.) pallidula.

== Description ==
The wingspan is about 18 mm. The forewings are white, irrorated with pale brownish. The veins are outlined in blackish form, and there is a terminal series of black spots. The hindwings are grey with a slight ochreous tinge. Adults have been recorded on wing in December and January.
