= Scoparia objurgalis =

Scientific classification
- Kingdom: Animalia
- Phylum: Arthropoda
- Class: Insecta
- Order: Lepidoptera
- Family: Crambidae
- Genus: Scoparia
- Species: S. objurgalis

Binomial name
- Scoparia objurgalis Guenée, 1854

Species of moth

Scoparia objurgalis is a moth in the family Crambidae. It was described by Achille Guenée in 1854. It is found in Australia.
