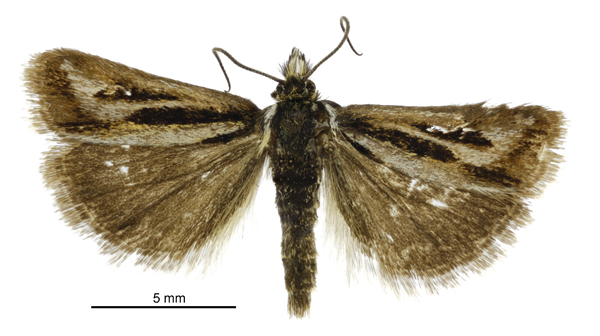
- Male
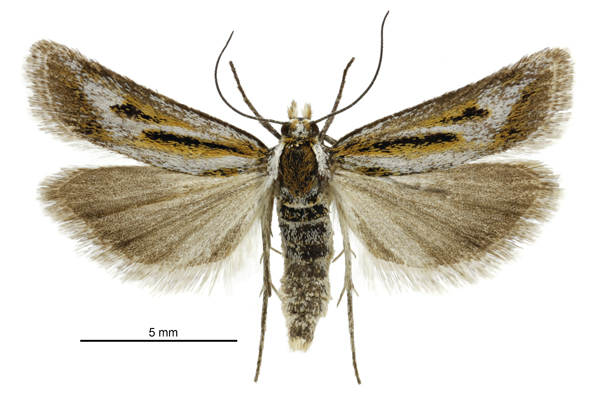
- Female

Scientific classification
- Kingdom: Animalia
- Phylum: Arthropoda
- Class: Insecta
- Order: Lepidoptera
- Family: Crambidae
- Genus: Scoparia
- Species: S. subita

Binomial name
- Scoparia subita (Philpott, 1912)

Synonyms
- Orocrambus subitus Philpott, 1912

= Scoparia subita =

Species of moth

Scoparia subita is a species of moth in the family Crambidae. It is endemic in New Zealand.

== Taxonomy ==
It was described by Alfred Philpott in 1912 using the name Orocrambus subitus. In 1929 Philpott noted that this species should be regarded as being in the genus Scoparia. However the placement of this species within Scoparia is in doubt. As a result, this species has also been referred to as Scoparia (s.l.) subitus.

== Description ==
The wingspan is 15–16 mm. The forewings are golden brown sprinkled with white scales and irrorated with white in the disc and along the dorsum. The hindwings are dark brownish-fuscous in males and grey in females. Adults have been recorded on wing in December.
