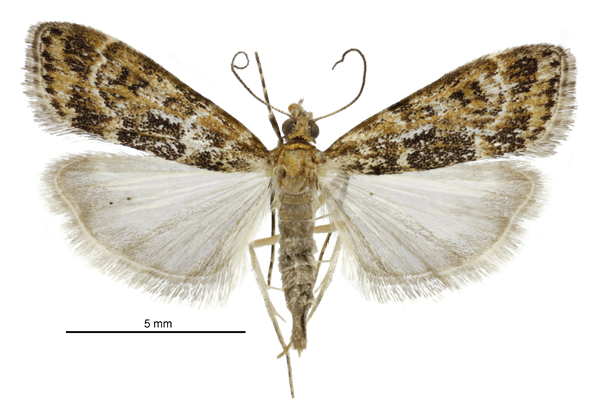
- Female
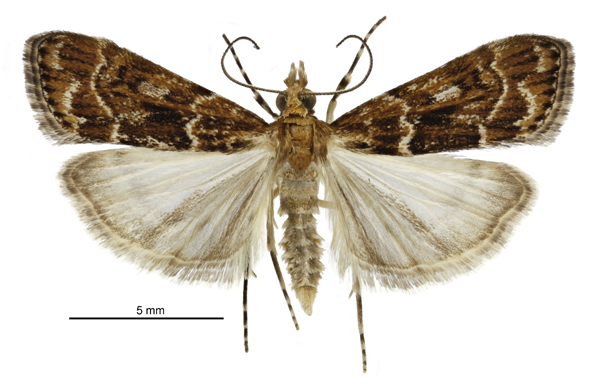
- Male

Scientific classification
- Kingdom: Animalia
- Phylum: Arthropoda
- Class: Insecta
- Order: Lepidoptera
- Family: Crambidae
- Genus: Scoparia
- Species: S. animosa

Binomial name
- Scoparia animosa Meyrick, 1914

= Scoparia animosa =

Species of moth

Scoparia animosa is a species moth in the family Crambidae. This species is endemic to New Zealand.

== Taxonomy ==
S. animosa was described by Edward Meyrick in 1914. However the placement of this species within the Scoparia genus is in doubt. As a result, this species has been referred to as Scoparia (s.l.) animosa.

== Description ==
The wingspan is about 15 mm. The forewings are bronzy-brown with scattered black scales. The dorsal two-thirds is suffused with black from the base to the first line. This first line is white, edged with black posteriorly. The second line is white, edged with some black scales anteriorly. The subterminal line is white and the space between this and the second line is marked with suffused black streaks on the veins. There is a row of small black spots round the apex and termen. The hindwings are grey-whitish, but greyer towards the termen. Adults have been recorded on wing in December.
