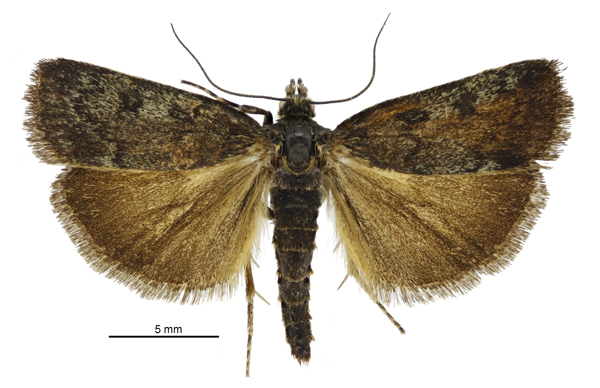
- Male

Scientific classification
- Kingdom: Animalia
- Phylum: Arthropoda
- Class: Insecta
- Order: Lepidoptera
- Family: Crambidae
- Genus: Scoparia
- Species: S. sideraspis

Binomial name
- Scoparia sideraspis Meyrick, 1905

= Scoparia sideraspis =

Species of insect

Scoparia sideraspis is a species of moth in the family Crambidae. It was described by Edward Meyrick in 1905. This species is endemic to New Zealand.

The wingspan is 25–28 mm.
