= Scoparia afghanorum =

Scientific classification
- Kingdom: Animalia
- Phylum: Arthropoda
- Clade: Pancrustacea
- Class: Insecta
- Order: Lepidoptera
- Family: Crambidae
- Genus: Scoparia
- Species: S. afghanorum

Binomial name
- Scoparia afghanorum Leraut, 1985

Species of moth

Scoparia afghanorum is a moth in the family Crambidae. It was described by Patrice J.A. Leraut in 1985. It is found in Afghanistan and in the Chinese provinces of Shaanxi, Sichuan and Yunnan.
