= Scoparia strigigramma =

Scientific classification
- Kingdom: Animalia
- Phylum: Arthropoda
- Class: Insecta
- Order: Lepidoptera
- Family: Crambidae
- Genus: Scoparia
- Species: S. strigigramma

Binomial name
- Scoparia strigigramma Hampson, 1917

Species of moth

Scoparia strigigramma is a moth in the family Crambidae. It was described by George Hampson in 1917. It is found in Peru.
