= Scoparia crocospila =

Scientific classification
- Kingdom: Animalia
- Phylum: Arthropoda
- Class: Insecta
- Order: Lepidoptera
- Family: Crambidae
- Genus: Scoparia
- Species: S. crocospila

Binomial name
- Scoparia crocospila Turner, 1922

Species of moth

Scoparia crocospila is a moth in the family Crambidae. It was described by Alfred Jefferis Turner in 1922. It is found in Australia, where it has been recorded from Victoria.
