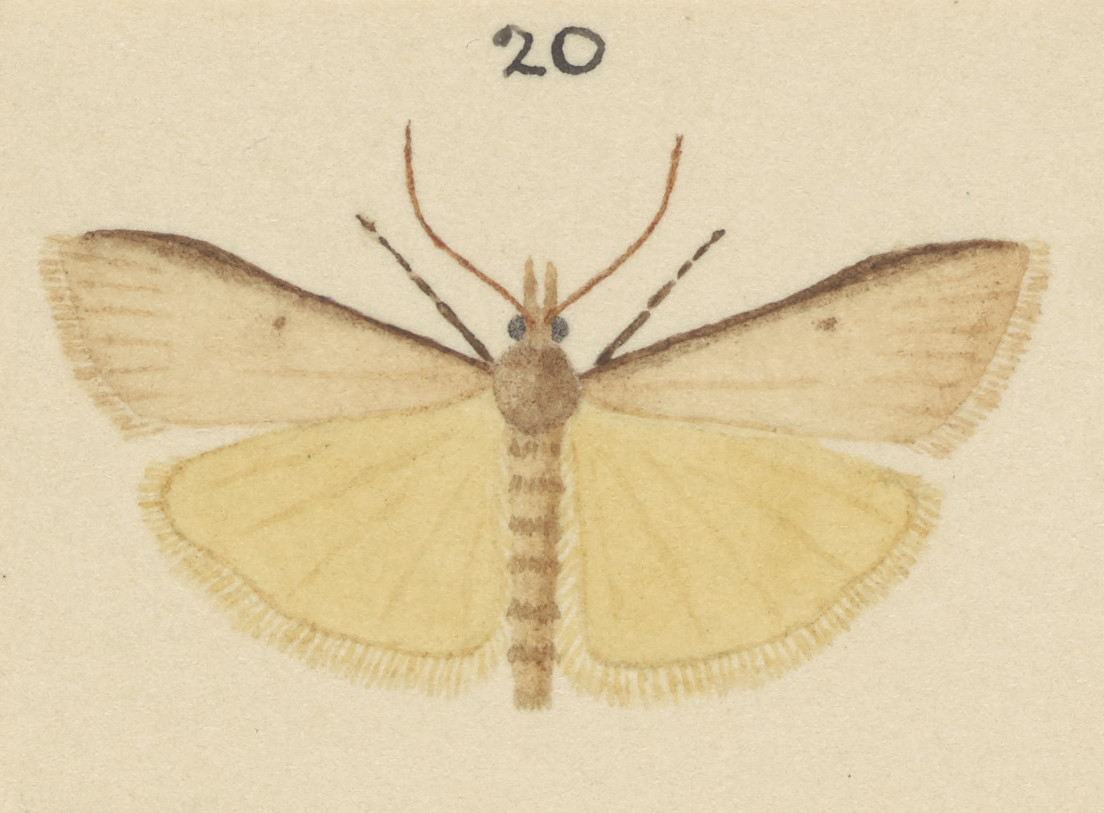

Scientific classification
- Kingdom: Animalia
- Phylum: Arthropoda
- Class: Insecta
- Order: Lepidoptera
- Family: Crambidae
- Genus: Scoparia
- Species: S. apheles

Binomial name
- Scoparia apheles (Meyrick, 1884)

Synonyms
- Xeroscopa apheles Meyrick, 1884

= Scoparia apheles =

Species of moth

Scoparia apheles is a moth of the family Crambidae. It was described by Edward Meyrick in 1884. This species is endemic to New Zealand.

The wingspan is about 31 mm. The forewings are light brownish ochreous with a hindmarginal row of black dots. The hindwings are ochreous whitish. Adults have been recorded on wing in January.
