= Scoparia ithyntis =

Scientific classification
- Kingdom: Animalia
- Phylum: Arthropoda
- Class: Insecta
- Order: Lepidoptera
- Family: Crambidae
- Genus: Scoparia
- Species: S. ithyntis

Binomial name
- Scoparia ithyntis Turner, 1922

Species of moth

Scoparia ithyntis is a moth in the family Crambidae. It was described by Turner in 1922. It is found in Australia, where it has been recorded from New South Wales and Victoria.

The wingspan is 14–16 mm. The forewings are whitish, irrorated with fuscous. The hindwings are whitish, tinged with greyish towards the termen. Adults have been recorded on wing in September and October.
