= Scoparia subgracilis =

Scientific classification
- Kingdom: Animalia
- Phylum: Arthropoda
- Class: Insecta
- Order: Lepidoptera
- Family: Crambidae
- Genus: Scoparia
- Species: S. subgracilis

Binomial name
- Scoparia subgracilis Sasaki, 1998

Species of moth

Scoparia subgracilis is a moth in the family Crambidae. It was described by Sasaki in 1998. It is found in Taiwan and China (Chongqing, Guizhou, Henan, Shaanxi).
