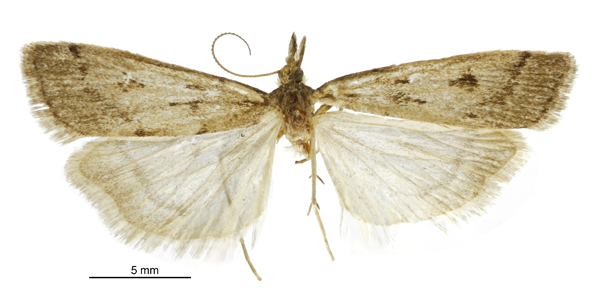
- Male

Scientific classification
- Kingdom: Animalia
- Phylum: Arthropoda
- Class: Insecta
- Order: Lepidoptera
- Family: Crambidae
- Genus: Scoparia
- Species: S. fumata

Binomial name
- Scoparia fumata Philpott, 1915

= Scoparia fumata =

Species of moth

Scoparia fumata is a species of moth in the family Crambidae. It is endemic in New Zealand.

== Taxonomy ==
It was described by Alfred Philpott in 1915. However the placement of this species within the genus Scoparia is in doubt. As a result, this species has also been referred to as Scoparia (s.l.) fumata.

== Description ==
The wingspan is 20–23 mm. The forewings are pale fuscous-brown with dark fuscous markings. The hindwings are grey, tinged with ochreous and with a darker subterminal line. Adults have been recorded on wing in December.
