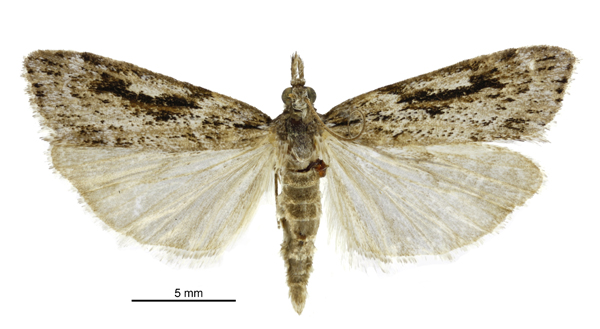
- Male

Scientific classification
- Kingdom: Animalia
- Phylum: Arthropoda
- Clade: Pancrustacea
- Class: Insecta
- Order: Lepidoptera
- Family: Crambidae
- Genus: Scoparia
- Species: S. falsa

Binomial name
- Scoparia falsa Philpott, 1924

= Scoparia falsa =

Species of moth

Scoparia falsa is a species of moth in the family Crambidae. It is endemic to New Zealand.

== Taxonomy ==
It was described by Alfred Philpott in 1924. However the placement of this species within the genus Scoparia is in doubt. As a result, this species has also been referred to as Scoparia (s.l.) falsa.

== Description ==
The wingspan is 21–24 mm. The forewings are pale brown, irrorated with white and with scattered blackish-brown scales. There is a short blackish-brown line from the middle of the base. The first line is white, margined with brown on the costa. The second line is white, anteriorly margined by a series of blackish dots. The hindwings are ochreous-grey, tinged with fuscous in females. Adults have been recorded on wing in February.
