= Scoparia leuconota =

Scientific classification
- Kingdom: Animalia
- Phylum: Arthropoda
- Clade: Pancrustacea
- Class: Insecta
- Order: Lepidoptera
- Family: Crambidae
- Genus: Scoparia
- Species: S. leuconota

Binomial name
- Scoparia leuconota (Lower, 1902)

Synonyms
- Eclipsiodes leuconota Lower, 1902

Species of moth

Scoparia leuconota is a moth in the family Crambidae. It was described by Oswald Bertram Lower in 1902. It is found in Australia, where it has been recorded to be found near South Australia.

The wingspan is about 20 mm. The forewings are ash-grey, white with blackish lines and a white, black-edged, round spot below the costa. Similar spots are found at the posterior extremity of the cell and there is a row of fine black dots along the termen. The hindwings are light fuscous, becoming darker along the terminal half. Adults have been recorded on wing in June.
