= Scoparia humilialis =

Scientific classification
- Kingdom: Animalia
- Phylum: Arthropoda
- Class: Insecta
- Order: Lepidoptera
- Family: Crambidae
- Genus: Scoparia
- Species: S. humilialis

Binomial name
- Scoparia humilialis Hudson, 1950

Species of moth

Scoparia humilialis is a species of moth in the family Crambidae. It is endemic to New Zealand.

== Taxonomy ==
It was described by George Vernon Hudson in 1950. However the placement of this species within the genus Scoparia is in doubt. As a result, this species has also been referred to as Scoparia (s.l.) humilialis.
