= Scoparia argolina =

Scientific classification
- Kingdom: Animalia
- Phylum: Arthropoda
- Class: Insecta
- Order: Lepidoptera
- Family: Crambidae
- Genus: Scoparia
- Species: S. argolina

Binomial name
- Scoparia argolina (Lower, 1902)

Synonyms
- Eclipsiodes argolina Lower, 1902

Species of moth

Scoparia argolina is a moth in the family Crambidae. It was described by Oswald Bertram Lower in 1902. It is found in Australia, where it has been recorded from New South Wales.
