= Scoparia penumbralis =

Scientific classification
- Kingdom: Animalia
- Phylum: Arthropoda
- Class: Insecta
- Order: Lepidoptera
- Family: Crambidae
- Genus: Scoparia
- Species: S. penumbralis

Binomial name
- Scoparia penumbralis Dyar, 1906

Species of moth

Scoparia penumbralis, the dark-brown scoparia moth, is a moth in the family Crambidae. It was described by Harrison Gray Dyar Jr. in 1906. It is found in North America, where it has been recorded from Alabama, Maine, Maryland, Massachusetts, Michigan, Minnesota, Newfoundland, North Carolina, Nova Scotia, Ohio, Ontario, Quebec, South Carolina, Tennessee, West Virginia and Wisconsin.

The wingspan is about 12 mm. The forewings are smoky brownish grey with whitish lines, edged by dark narrow shades. Adults are on wing from May to September
