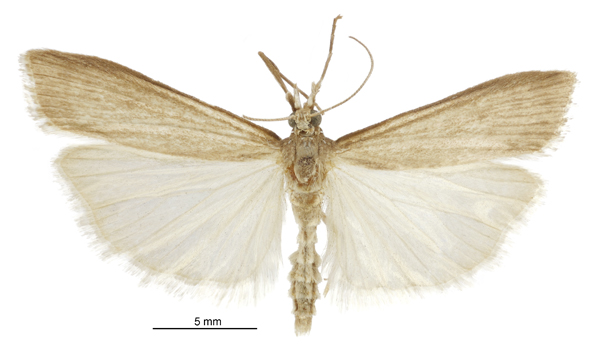
- Male

Scientific classification
- Kingdom: Animalia
- Phylum: Arthropoda
- Class: Insecta
- Order: Lepidoptera
- Family: Crambidae
- Genus: Scoparia
- Species: S. augastis

Binomial name
- Scoparia augastis Meyrick, 1907

= Scoparia augastis =

Species of moth

Scoparia augastis is a moth in the family Crambidae. It was described by Edward Meyrick in 1907. This species is endemic to New Zealand.

The wingspan is 28–29 mm. The forewings are light fuscous, irrorated with whitish. The costa and all veins are marked by somewhat darker fuscous lines. The hindwings are very pale brassy-ochreous. Adults have been recorded on wing in March on flowers of Senecio species.
