= Scoparia multifacies =

Scientific classification
- Kingdom: Animalia
- Phylum: Arthropoda
- Class: Insecta
- Order: Lepidoptera
- Family: Crambidae
- Genus: Scoparia
- Species: S. multifacies

Binomial name
- Scoparia multifacies Dyar, 1929

Species of moth

Scoparia multifacies is a moth in the family Crambidae. It was described by Harrison Gray Dyar Jr. in 1929. It is found in Guatemala and Xalapa, Mexico.

The wingspan is about 13 mm. The forewings are light grey, shaded with blackish beyond the inner line and terminally. The inner line is pale. The hindwings are whitish, but fuscous at the margin. Adults have been recorded on wing in July.
