= Scoparia philippinensis =

Scientific classification
- Kingdom: Animalia
- Phylum: Arthropoda
- Class: Insecta
- Order: Lepidoptera
- Family: Crambidae
- Genus: Scoparia
- Species: S. philippinensis

Binomial name
- Scoparia philippinensis (Hampson, 1917)

Synonyms
- Microglossa philippinensis Hampson, 1917

Species of moth

Scoparia philippinensis is a moth in the family Crambidae. It is found in the Philippines (Negros).
