= Scoparia erythroneura =

Scientific classification
- Kingdom: Animalia
- Phylum: Arthropoda
- Clade: Pancrustacea
- Class: Insecta
- Order: Lepidoptera
- Family: Crambidae
- Genus: Scoparia
- Species: S. erythroneura

Binomial name
- Scoparia erythroneura (Turner, 1937)

Synonyms
- Platytes erythroneura Turner, 1937

Species of moth

Scoparia erythroneura is a moth in the family Crambidae. It was described by A.J. Turner in 1937. It is found in Australia, where it has been recorded in South Australia.
