= Scoparia stenopa =

Scientific classification
- Kingdom: Animalia
- Phylum: Arthropoda
- Class: Insecta
- Order: Lepidoptera
- Family: Crambidae
- Genus: Scoparia
- Species: S. stenopa

Binomial name
- Scoparia stenopa Lower, 1902

Species of moth

Scoparia stenopa is a moth in the family Crambidae. It was described by Oswald Bertram Lower in 1902. It is found in Australia, where it has been recorded from South Australia.

The wingspan is about 20 mm. The forewings are light fuscous, strongly irrorated (speckled) with whitish and with obscure blackish lines. There is a suffused blackish streak along the fold and the lower edge of the cell is edged by a fine ferruginous line. There is also an elongate whitish mark in the cell, as well as some short black elongate lines towards the termen and apex and a row of suffused blackish spots along the termen. The hindwings are grey whitish, becoming somewhat darker towards the termen. Adults have been recorded on wing in April.
