= Scoparia ulmaya =

Scientific classification
- Kingdom: Animalia
- Phylum: Arthropoda
- Class: Insecta
- Order: Lepidoptera
- Family: Crambidae
- Genus: Scoparia
- Species: S. ulmaya

Binomial name
- Scoparia ulmaya Dyar, 1929

Species of moth

Scoparia ulmaya is a moth in the family Crambidae. It was described by Harrison Gray Dyar Jr. in 1929. It is found on the West Indies, where it has been recorded from Guadeloupe.

The wingspan is about 10 mm. The forewings are brown with a slight bronzy reflection. The lines are pale and there is a round black spot, as well as a thick rectangular black dash. The spaces between the marks are filled with brown and there are two black terminal patches. Adults have been recorded on wing in July.
