= Scoparia noacki =

Scientific classification
- Kingdom: Animalia
- Phylum: Arthropoda
- Clade: Pancrustacea
- Class: Insecta
- Order: Lepidoptera
- Family: Crambidae
- Genus: Scoparia
- Species: S. noacki

Binomial name
- Scoparia noacki Nuss, 2002

Species of moth

Scoparia noacki is a moth in the family Crambidae. It was described by Nuss in 2002. It is found in the Luzon island of the Philippines.
