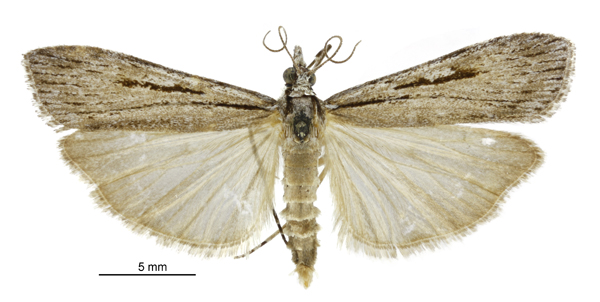
- Male

Scientific classification
- Kingdom: Animalia
- Phylum: Arthropoda
- Class: Insecta
- Order: Lepidoptera
- Family: Crambidae
- Genus: Scoparia
- Species: S. indistinctalis

Binomial name
- Scoparia indistinctalis (Walker, 1863)

Synonyms
- Hypochalcia indistinctalis Walker, 1863

= Scoparia indistinctalis =

Species of moth

Scoparia indistinctalis is a species of moth in the family Crambidae. It is endemic to New Zealand.

== Taxonomy ==
This species was described by Francis Walker in 1863 and named Hypochalcia indistinctalis. In 1885 Edward Meyrick placed the species within the genus Scoparia. However the placement of this species within Scoparia is in doubt. As a result, this species has also been referred to as Scoparia (s.l.) indistinctalis.

== Description ==
The wingspan is 23–25 mm. The forewings are white, finely irrorated (sprinkled) with blackish or dark fuscous. There are faint indications of a white line before the first line. This first line itself is indistinct, white and blackish margined posteriorly. The second line is white and obscurely dark margined. The terminal area is suffused with blackish towards the anal angle and the subterminal line is cloudy and whitish. There is a row of blackish dots on the veins before the hindmargin. The hindwings are pale whitish ochreous, suffused with light greyish. The lunule and postmedian line are somewhat darker and there is a suffused dark fuscous hindmarginal band. Adults have been recorded on wing from December to February.
