= Scoparia blanchardi =

Scientific classification
- Kingdom: Animalia
- Phylum: Arthropoda
- Class: Insecta
- Order: Lepidoptera
- Family: Crambidae
- Genus: Scoparia
- Species: S. blanchardi

Binomial name
- Scoparia blanchardi Munroe, 1972

Species of moth

Scoparia blanchardi is a moth in the family Crambidae. It was described by Eugene G. Munroe in 1972. It is found in North America, where it has been recorded from Texas.
