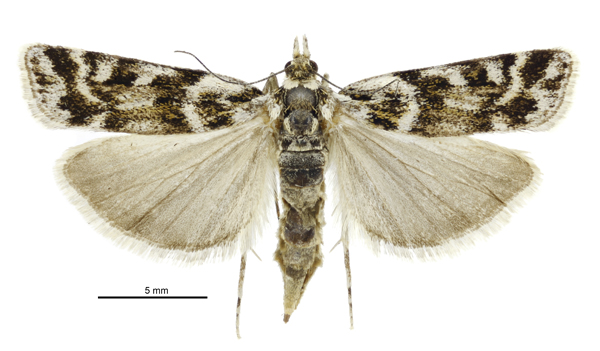
- Female
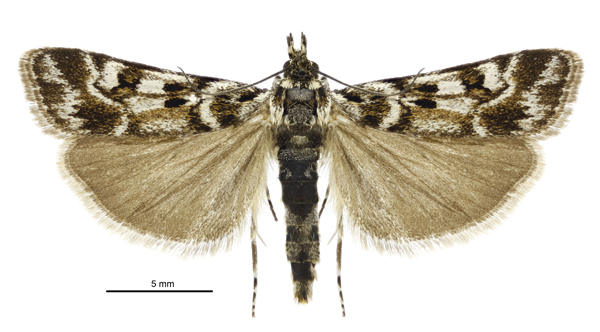
- Male

Scientific classification
- Kingdom: Animalia
- Phylum: Arthropoda
- Class: Insecta
- Order: Lepidoptera
- Family: Crambidae
- Genus: Scoparia
- Species: S. famularis

Binomial name
- Scoparia famularis Philpott, 1930

= Scoparia famularis =

Species of moth

Scoparia famularis is a species of moth in the family Crambidae. It is endemic to New Zealand.

== Taxonomy ==
It was described by Alfred Philpott in 1930. However the placement of this species within the genus Scoparia is in doubt. As a result, this species has also been referred to as Scoparia (s.l.) famularis.
