= Scoparia canicostalis =

Scientific classification
- Kingdom: Animalia
- Phylum: Arthropoda
- Class: Insecta
- Order: Lepidoptera
- Family: Crambidae
- Genus: Scoparia
- Species: S. canicostalis

Binomial name
- Scoparia canicostalis Hampson, 1896

Species of moth

Scoparia canicostalis is a moth in the family Crambidae. It was described by George Hampson in 1896. It is found in India's Nilgiri Mountains.
