= Scoparia monticola =

Scientific classification
- Kingdom: Animalia
- Phylum: Arthropoda
- Clade: Pancrustacea
- Class: Insecta
- Order: Lepidoptera
- Family: Crambidae
- Genus: Scoparia
- Species: S. monticola

Binomial name
- Scoparia monticola Nuss, 1998

Species of moth

Scoparia monticola is a moth in the family Crambidae. It was described by Nuss in 1998. It is found in the Philippines (Mindanao).
