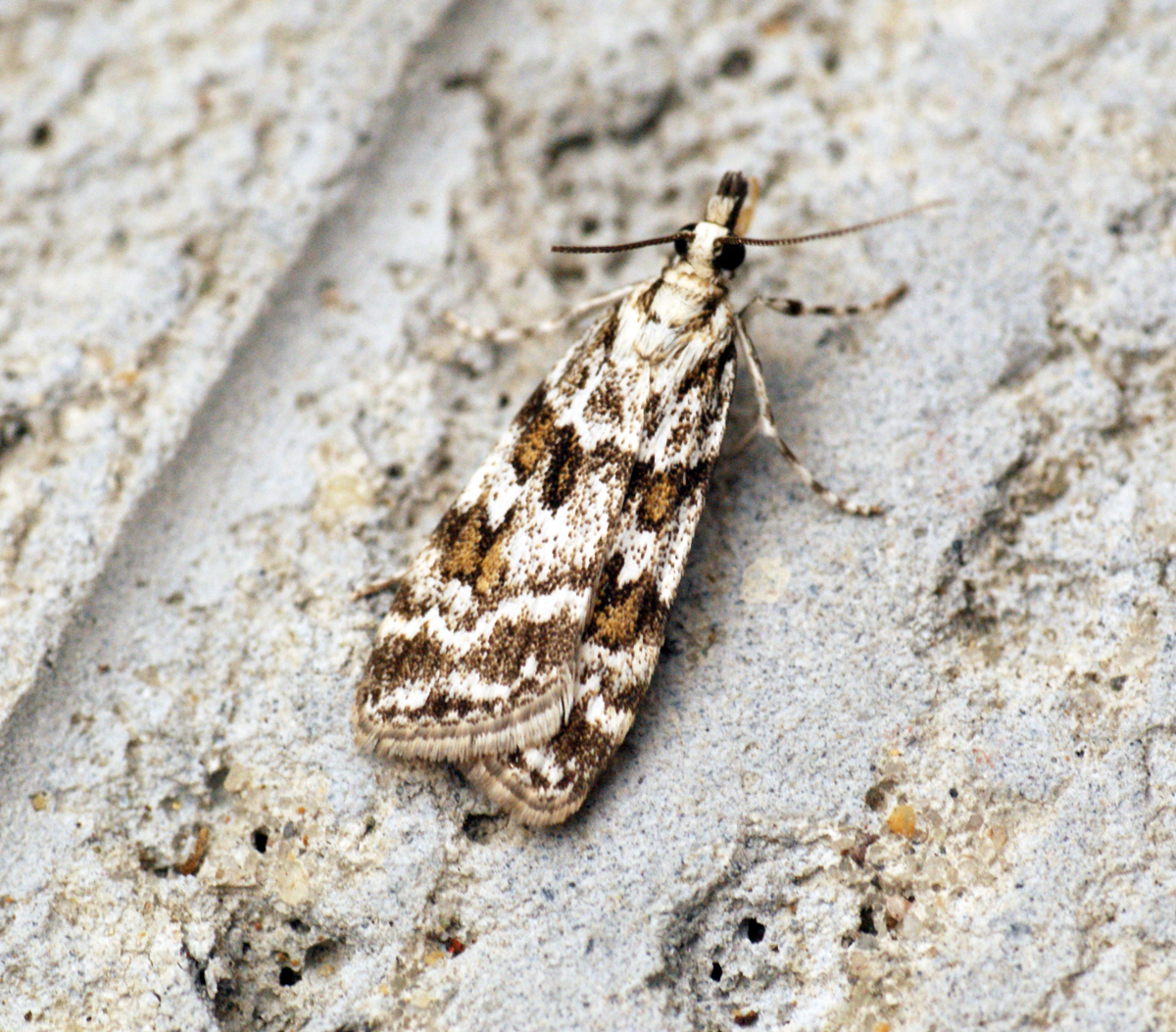
- Scoparia pyralella

Scientific classification
- Kingdom: Animalia
- Phylum: Arthropoda
- Clade: Pancrustacea
- Class: Insecta
- Order: Lepidoptera
- Family: Crambidae
- Subfamily: Scopariinae
- Genus: Scoparia; Haworth, 1811

Synonyms
- Epileucia Stephens, 1852; Eudorea J. Curtis, 1827; Eudoria Chapman, 1912; Eudoroea Bruand, 1851; Phegea Gistel, 1848; Scopea Haworth, 1828; Sineudonia Leraut, 1986; Tetraprosopus Butler, 1882; Xeroscopa Meyrick, 1884

= Scoparia (moth) =

Genus of moths

Scoparia is a grass moth genus (family Crambidae) of subfamily Scopariinae. Some authors have assigned the synonymous taxon Sineudonia to the snout moth family (Pyralidae), where all grass moths were once also included, but this seems to be in error.

As of 2012, there were about 231 species. Species occur on every continent except Antarctica. They are most reliably distinguished from one another by the structure of the male genitalia.

== Species ==
- Scoparia absconditalis Christoph in Romanoff, 1887
- Scoparia acharis Meyrick, 1885
- Scoparia acropola Meyrick, 1885
- Scoparia aequipennalis Warren, 1905
- Scoparia afghanorum Leraut, 1985
- Scoparia albifrons Druce, 1896
- Scoparia albifusalis Hampson, 1907
- Scoparia albipunctata Druce, 1899
- Scoparia albonigra Nuss, 2000
- Scoparia alticola Meyrick, 1935
- Scoparia ambigualis (Treitschke, 1829)
- Scoparia anadonta Dyar, 1918
- Scoparia anagantis Dyar, 1918
- Scoparia anaplecta Meyrick, 1885
- Scoparia ancipitella (La Harpe, 1855)
- Scoparia animosa Meyrick, 1914
- Scoparia antarcticalis Staudinger, 1899
- Scoparia apachealis Munroe, 1972
- Scoparia apheles (Meyrick, 1884)
- Scoparia arcta T. P. Lucas, 1898
- Scoparia argolina (Lower, 1902)
- Scoparia astragalota (Meyrick, 1885)
- Scoparia atricuprea Hampson, 1917
- Scoparia augastis Meyrick, 1907
- Scoparia australiensis (Hampson, 1899)
- Scoparia autochroa Meyrick, 1907
- Scoparia autumna Philpott, 1927
- Scoparia axiolecta Turner, 1922
- Scoparia basalis Walker, 1866
- Scoparia basistrigalis Knaggs, 1866
- Scoparia benigna Meyrick, 1910
- Scoparia berytella Rebel, 1911
- Scoparia bifaria Li, Li & Nuss, 2010
- Scoparia biplagialis Walker, 1866
- Scoparia biradiellus (Mabille, 1885)
- Scoparia biscutella Zeller, 1872
- Scoparia blanchardi Munroe, 1972
- Scoparia brevituba Li, Li & Nuss, 2010
- Scoparia brunnea (Leraut, 1986)
- Scoparia caesia (Philpott, 1926)
- Scoparia californialis Munroe, 1972
- Scoparia caliginosa Philpott, 1918
- Scoparia canicostalis Hampson, 1896
- Scoparia caradjai Leraut, 1986
- Scoparia carvalhoi Nuss, Karsholt & Meyer, 1998

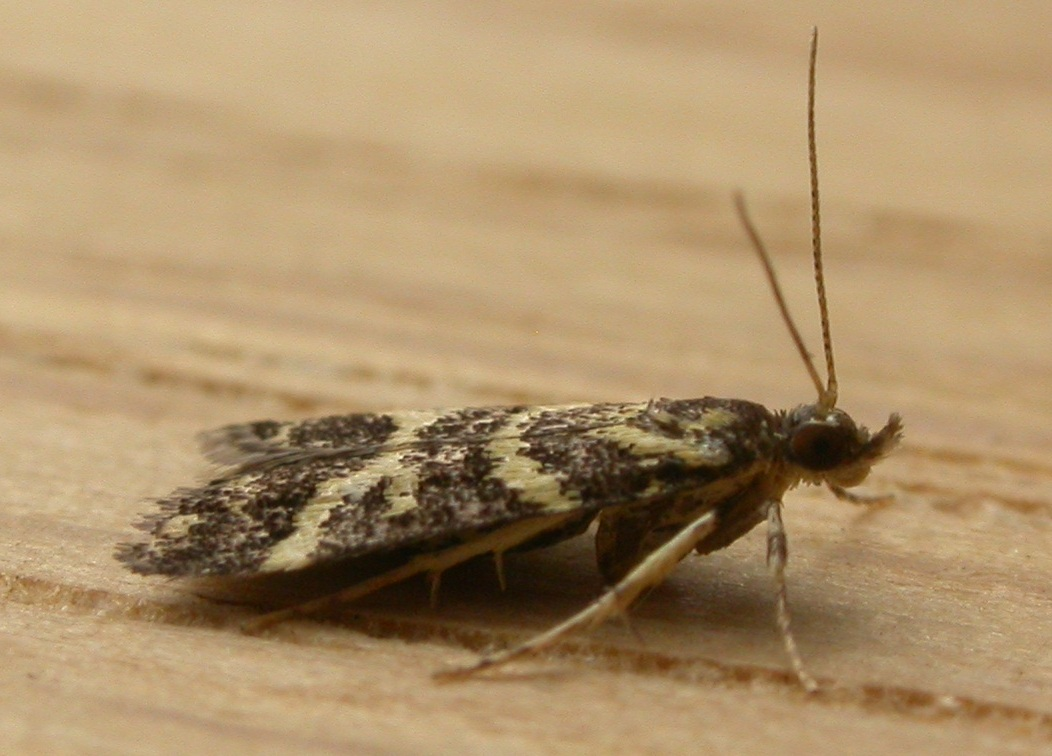
Scoparia spelaea

- Scoparia chalicodes Meyrick, 1885
- Scoparia charopoea Turner, 1908
- Scoparia chiasta Meyrick, 1885
- Scoparia cinefacta Philpott, 1926
- Scoparia cinereomedia Dyar, 1904
- Scoparia claranota Howes, 1946
- Scoparia clavata Philpott, 1912
- Scoparia coecimaculalis Warren, 1905
- Scoparia congestalis Walker, 1859
- Scoparia conicella (La Harpe, 1863)
- Scoparia contempta (Turner, 1927)
- Scoparia contexta Philpott, 1931
- Scoparia cordata Li, 2012
- Scoparia crepuscula Salmon, 1946
- Scoparia crocalis Hampson, 1903
- Scoparia crocospila Turner, 1922
- Scoparia crucigera Gerasimov, 1930
- Scoparia crypserythra (Lower, 1901)
- Scoparia cyameuta (Meyrick, 1885)
- Scoparia declivis Philpott, 1918
- Scoparia dela J. F. G. Clarke, 1965
- Scoparia delicatalis Walker, 1866
- Scoparia deliniens T. P. Lucas, 1898
- Scoparia denigata Dyar, 1929
- Scoparia depressoides Inoue, 1994
- Scoparia dicteella Rebel, 1916
- Scoparia dipenda Maes, 1996
- Scoparia dispersa Butler, 1883
- Scoparia distictalis (Hampson, 1908)
- Scoparia dominicki Munroe, 1972
- Scoparia dryphactis Meyrick, 1911
- Scoparia ejuncida Knaggs, 1867
- Scoparia elongalis Maes, 1996
- Scoparia emmetropis Turner, 1915

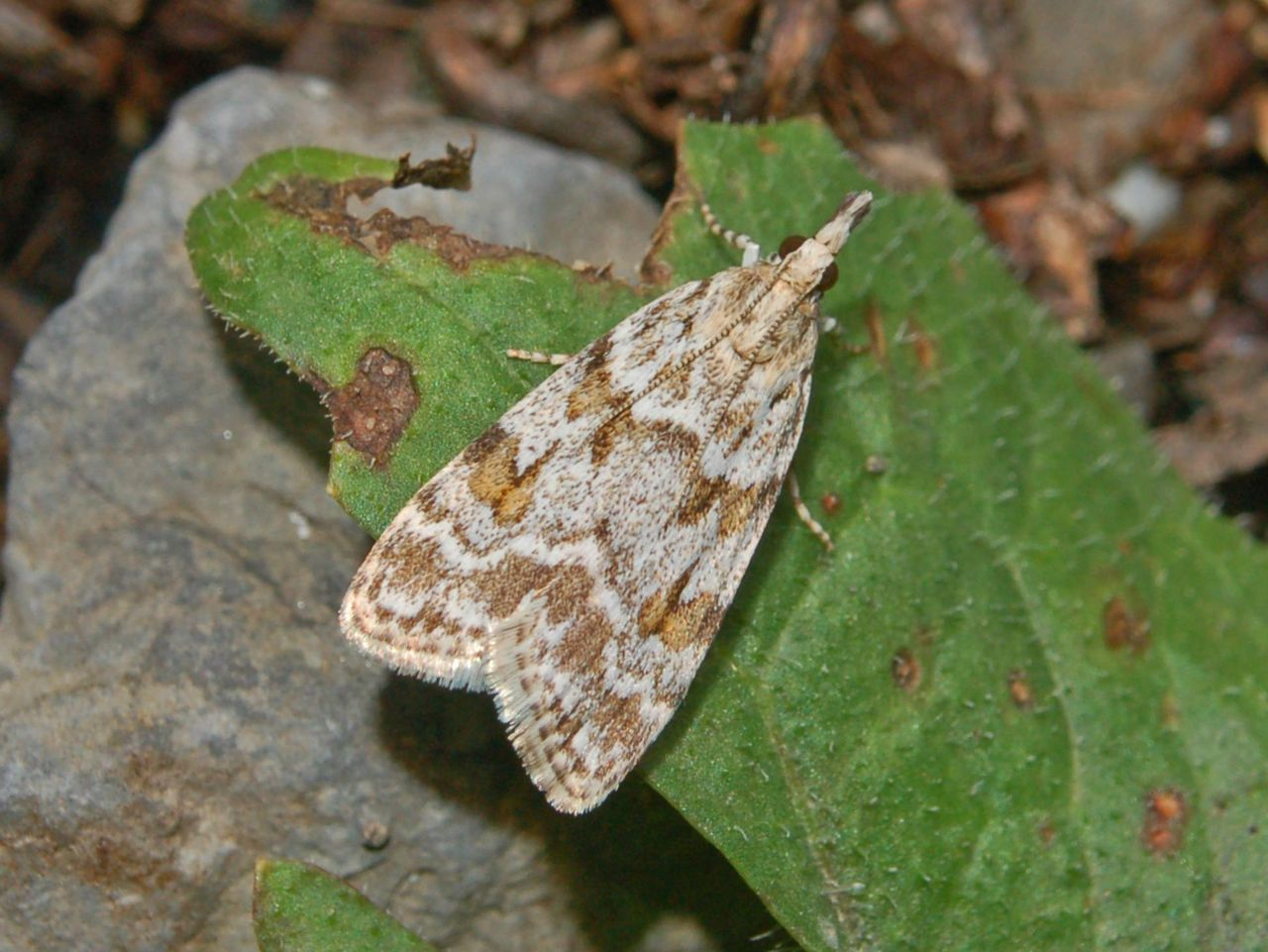
Scoparia pyralella

- Scoparia encapna Meyrick, 1888
- Scoparia epigypsa (Lower, 1902)
- Scoparia ergatis Meyrick, 1885
- Scoparia erythroneura (Turner, 1937)
- Scoparia eumeles Meyrick, 1885
- Scoparia eutacta Turner, 1931
- Scoparia exhibitalis Walker, [1866]
- Scoparia fakoensis Maes, 1996
- Scoparia falsa Philpott, 1924
- Scoparia famularis Philpott, 1930
- Scoparia favilliferella (Walker, 1866)
- Scoparia fimbriata Philpott, 1917
- Scoparia fragosa Meyrick, 1910
- Scoparia fumata Philpott, 1915
- Scoparia gallica Peyerimhoff, 1873
- Scoparia ganevi Leraut, 1985
- Scoparia gethosyna Turner, 1922
- Scoparia glauculalis Hampson, 1897
- Scoparia gomphota Meyrick, 1885
- Scoparia gracilis Philpott, 1924
- Scoparia graeca Nuss, 2005
- Scoparia halopis Meyrick, 1909
- Scoparia harpalea (Meyrick, 1885)
- Scoparia huachucalis Munroe, 1972
- Scoparia humilialis Hudson, 1950
- Scoparia hypoxantha Lower, 1896
- Scoparia ignicola (Staudinger, 1899)
- Scoparia illota Philpott, 1919
- Scoparia indica Leraut, 1986
- Scoparia indistinctalis (Walker, 1863)

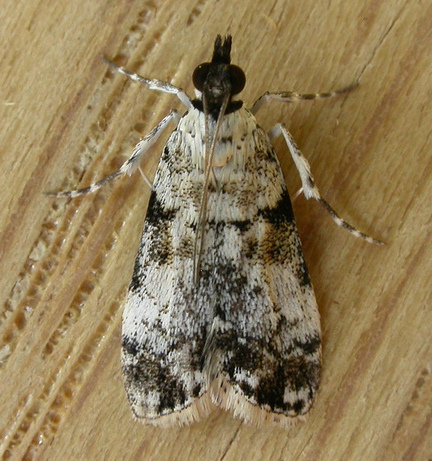
Scoparia niphetodes

- Scoparia ingratella (Zeller, 1846)
- Scoparia ischnoptera Turner, 1922
- Scoparia italica Turati, 1919
- Scoparia ithyntis Turner, 1922
- Scoparia iwasakii Sasaki, 1991
- Scoparia jiuzhaiensis Li, Li & Nuss, 2010
- Scoparia jonesalis Dyar, 1915
- Scoparia juldusellus (Caradja, 1916)
- Scoparia kanai Maes, 1996
- Scoparia largispinea Li, Li & Nuss, 2010
- Scoparia latipennis Sasaki, 1991
- Scoparia lativitta (Moore, 1883)
- Scoparia leucomela Lower, 1893
- Scoparia leuconota (Lower, 1902)
- Scoparia limatula Philpott, 1901
- Scoparia longipennis Zeller, 1872
- Scoparia lychnophanes Meyrick, 1927
- Scoparia mandschurica Christoph, 1881
- Scoparia manifestella (Herrich-Schäffer, 1848)
- Scoparia matsuii Inoue, 1994
- Scoparia matuta J. F. G. Clarke, 1965
- Scoparia mediorufalis Hampson, 1896
- Scoparia melanoxantha Turner, 1922
- Scoparia metaleucalis Hampson, 1907
- Scoparia meyi Nuss, 1998
- Scoparia meyrickii (Butler, 1882)
- Scoparia molestalis Inoue, 1982
- Scoparia molifera Meyrick, 1926
- Scoparia monochroma Salmon, 1946
- Scoparia monticola Nuss, 1998
- Scoparia multifacies Dyar, 1929
- Scoparia murificalis Walker, 1859
- Scoparia nephelitis (Meyrick, 1887)
- Scoparia ngangaoensis Maes, 2004
- Scoparia nigripunctalis Maes, 2004
- Scoparia niphetodes Turner, 1931
- Scoparia niphospora (Meyrick, 1884)

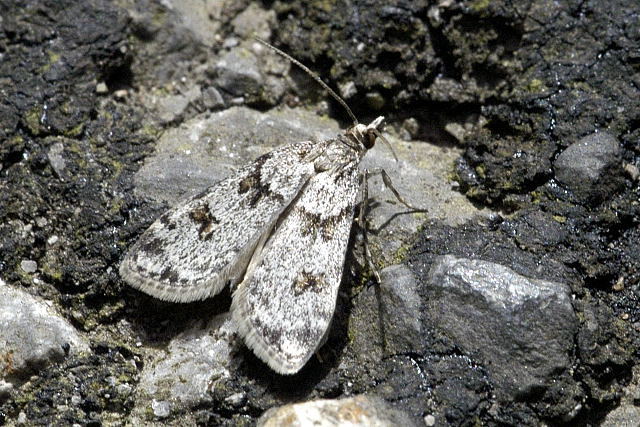
Scoparia ambigualis

- Scoparia nipponalis Inoue, 1982
- Scoparia noacki Nuss, 2002
- Scoparia nomeutis (Meyrick, 1885)
- Scoparia normalis Dyar, 1904
- Scoparia objurgalis Guenée, 1854
- Scoparia obsoleta Staudinger, 1879
- Scoparia ochrophara Turner, 1915
- Scoparia ochrotalis Hampson, 1903
- Scoparia olivaris Hampson, 1891
- Scoparia ololuae Maes, 2004
- Scoparia oxycampyla (Turner, 1937)
- Scoparia oxygona Meyrick, 1897
- Scoparia pallidula Philpott, 1928
- Scoparia palloralis Dyar, 1906
- Scoparia panopla Meyrick, 1885
- Scoparia parachalca Meyrick, 1901
- Scoparia paracycla (Lower, 1902)
- Scoparia parca Philpott, 1928
- Scoparia parmifera Meyrick, 1909
- Scoparia pascoella Philpott, 1920
- Scoparia pediopola (Turner, 1937)
- Scoparia penumbralis Dyar, 1906
- Scoparia perplexella (Zeller, 1839)
- Scoparia petrina (Meyrick, 1885)
- Scoparia phaealis Hampson, 1903
- Scoparia phalerias Meyrick, 1905
- Scoparia philippinensis (Hampson, 1917)
- Scoparia philonephes (Meyrick, 1885)
- Scoparia plagiotis Meyrick, 1887
- Scoparia platymera Lower, 1905
- Scoparia polialis Hampson, 1903
- Scoparia poliophaealis Hampson, 1907

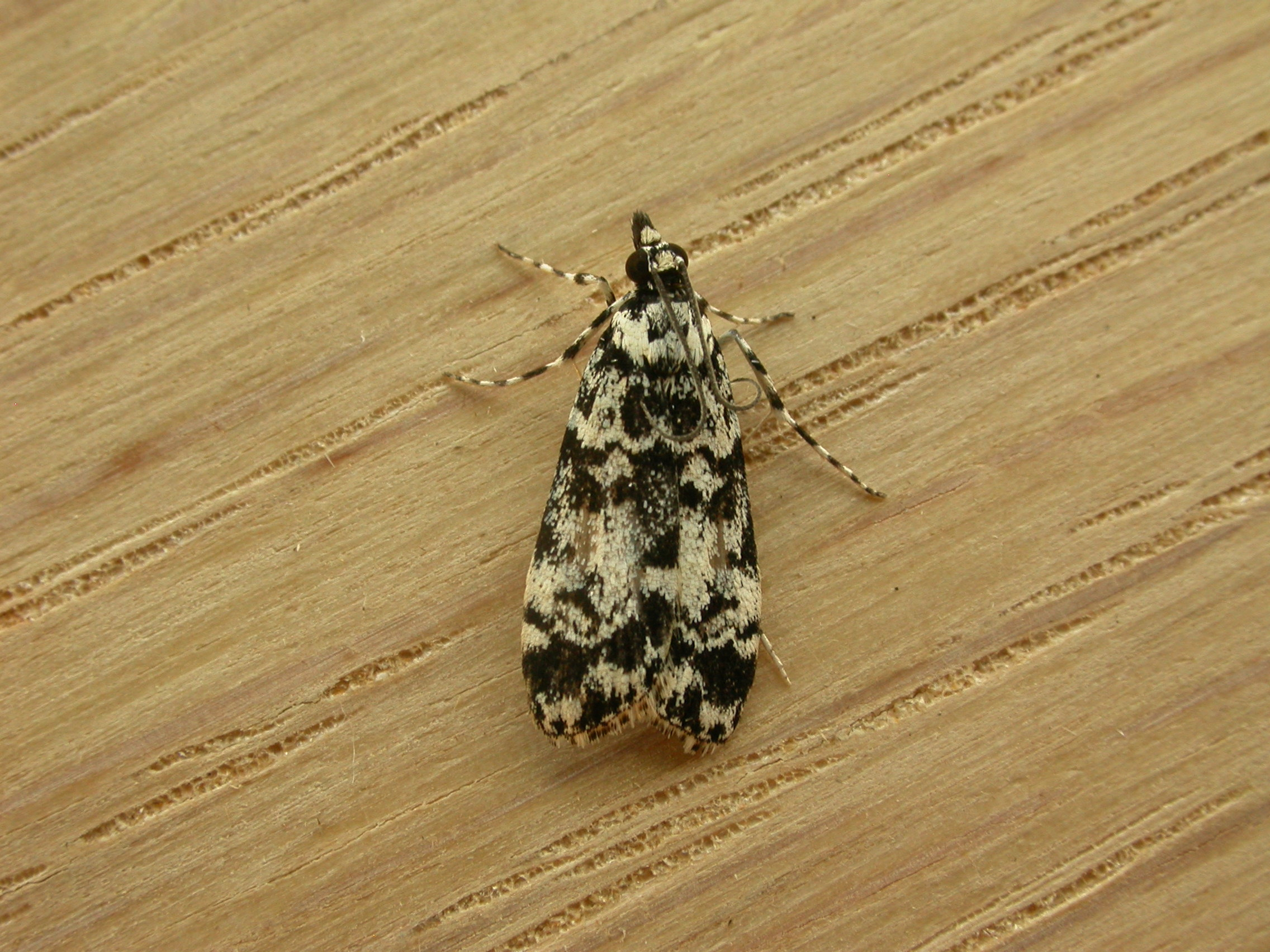
Scoparia aphrodes

- Scoparia pulveralis Snellen, 1890
- Scoparia pulverulentellus (Zeller, 1872)
- Scoparia pura Philpott, 1924
- Scoparia pusillula Munroe, 1995
- Scoparia pyralella (Denis & Schiffermüller, 1775)
- Scoparia pyraustoides J. F. G. Clarke, 1965
- Scoparia resinodes de Joannis, 1932
- Scoparia rigidalis Barnes & McDunnough, 1912
- Scoparia rotuellus (C. Felder, R. Felder & Rogenhofer, 1875)
- Scoparia rufostigma Hampson, 1891
- Scoparia ruidosalis Munroe, 1972
- Scoparia saerdabella Osthelder, 1938
- Scoparia scripta Philpott, 1918
- Scoparia semiamplalis Warren, 1905
- Scoparia sideraspis Meyrick, 1905
- Scoparia sinensis Leraut, 1986
- Scoparia sinuata Philpott, 1930
- Scoparia spadix Nuss, 1998
- Scoparia spelaea Meyrick, 1885
- Scoparia spinata Inoue, 1982
- Scoparia spinosa Li, Li & Nuss, 2010
- Scoparia staudingeralis (Mabille, 1869)
- Scoparia stenopa Lower, 1902
- Scoparia stoetzneri Caradja, 1927
- Scoparia strigigramma Hampson, 1917
- Scoparia subfusca Haworth, 1811
- Scoparia subgracilis Sasaki, 1998
- Scoparia subita (Philpott, 1912)
- Scoparia submedinella Caradja, 1927
- Scoparia submolestalis Inoue, 1982
- Scoparia subtersa Dyar, 1929
- Scoparia sylvestris C. E. Clarke, 1926
- Scoparia syntaracta Meyrick, 1885
- Scoparia taiwanensis Sasaki, 1998
- Scoparia termobola Meyrick, 1938
- Scoparia tetracycla Meyrick, 1885
- Scoparia tohokuensis Inoue, 1982
- Scoparia trapezophora Meyrick, 1885
- Scoparia triscelis Meyrick, 1909
- Scoparia tristicta Turner, 1922
- Scoparia tritocirrha Turner, 1918
- Scoparia tuicana C. E. Clarke, 1926
- Scoparia turneri Philpott, 1928
- Scoparia ulmaya Dyar, 1929
- Scoparia uncinata Li, Li & Nuss, 2010
- Scoparia ustimacula C. Felder, R. Felder & Rogenhofer, 1875
- Scoparia utsugii Inoue, 1994
- Scoparia valenternota Howes, 1946
- Scoparia vinotinctalis Hampson, 1896
- Scoparia vulpecula Meyrick, 1927
- Scoparia x-signata (Filipjev, 1927)
- Scoparia yakushimana Inoue, 1982
- Scoparia yamanakai Inoue, 1982

== Selected former species ==
- Scoparia atropicta Hampson, 1897
