= Scoparia nephelitis =

Scientific classification
- Kingdom: Animalia
- Phylum: Arthropoda
- Class: Insecta
- Order: Lepidoptera
- Family: Crambidae
- Genus: Scoparia
- Species: S. nephelitis

Binomial name
- Scoparia nephelitis (Meyrick, 1887)

Synonyms
- Xeroscopa nephelitis Meyrick, 1887

Species of moth

Scoparia nephelitis is a moth in the family Crambidae. It was described by Edward Meyrick in 1887. It is found in Australia, where it has been recorded from New South Wales.

It is a member of the grass moth genus, which has species on every continent except Antarctica.
