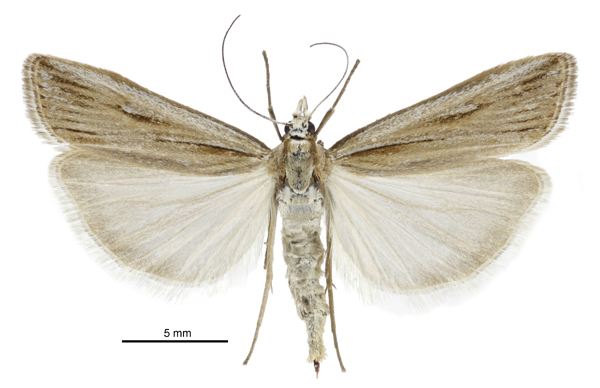
- Female
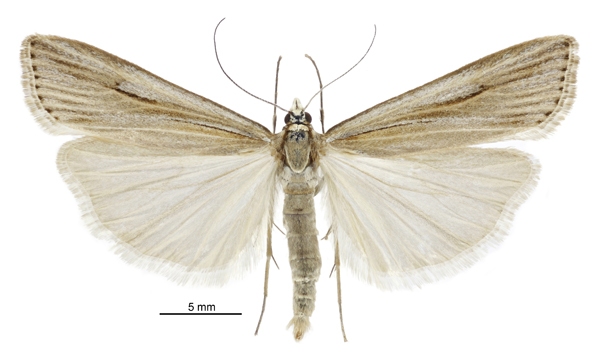
- Male

Scientific classification
- Kingdom: Animalia
- Phylum: Arthropoda
- Class: Insecta
- Order: Lepidoptera
- Family: Crambidae
- Genus: Scoparia
- Species: S. panopla

Binomial name
- Scoparia panopla Meyrick, 1884

= Scoparia panopla =

Species of moth

Scoparia panopla is a species of moth in the family Crambidae. It is endemic to New Zealand.

== Taxonomy ==
This species was named by Edward Meyrick in 1884. Meyrick gave a description of the species in 1885. However the placement of this species within the genus Scoparia is in doubt. As a result, this species has also been referred to as Scoparia (s.l.) panopla.

== Description ==
The wingspan is about 31 mm for males and 25 mm for females. The forewings are brownish-ochreous, irrorated with white on a streak along the costa. There is a sinuate streak from the middle of the disc to the hindmargin, as well as a narrow black streak from the base along the submedian fold to the middle. The veins between the apex and anal angle are posteriorly marked with blackish streaks, as well as a hindmarginal row of blackish dots. The hindwings are grey-whitish, with a narrow, somewhat darker hindmarginal band. Adults have been recorded on wing in January.
