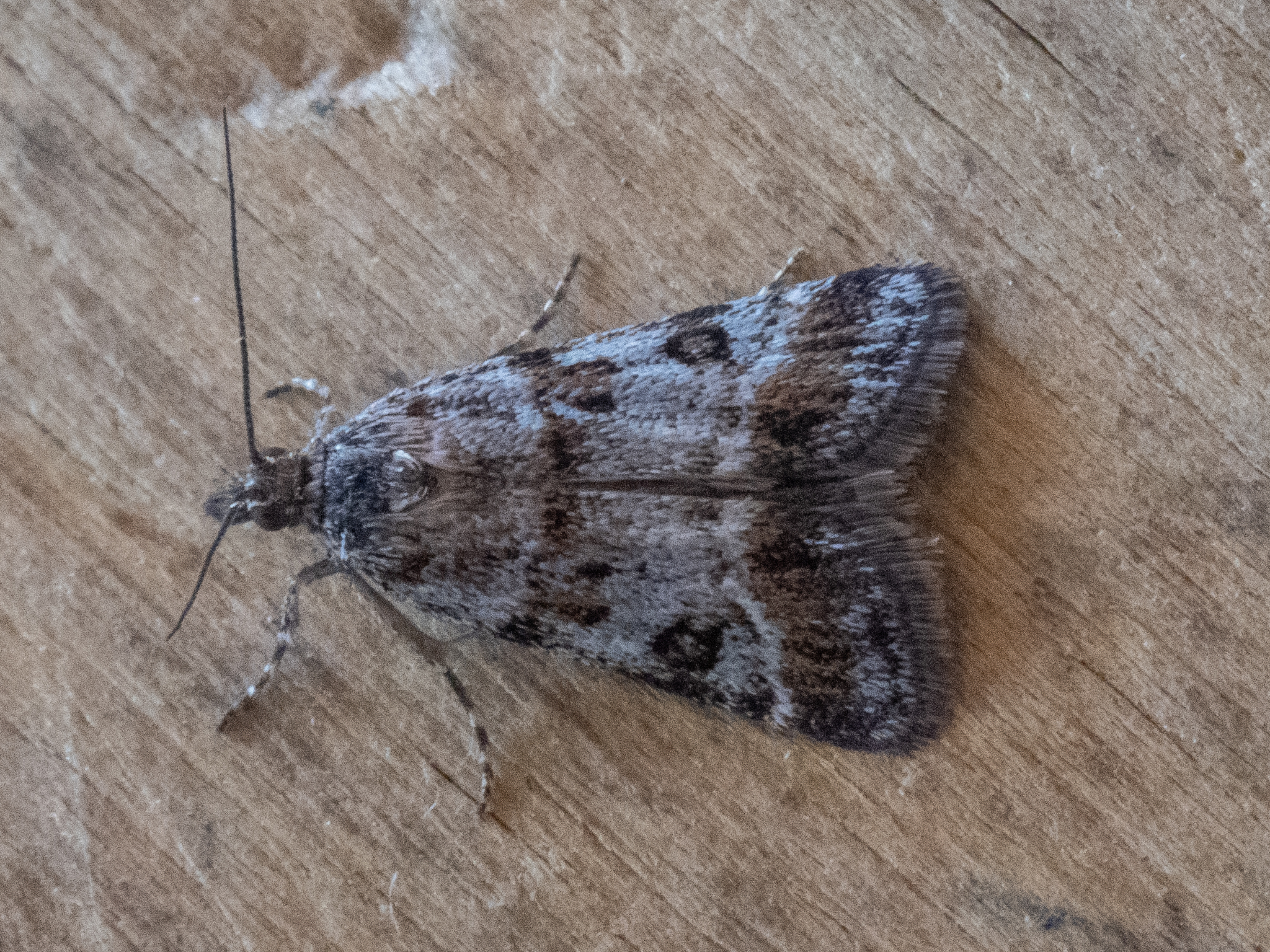

Conservation status
- Data Deficit (NZ TCS)

Scientific classification
- Kingdom: Animalia
- Phylum: Arthropoda
- Clade: Pancrustacea
- Class: Insecta
- Order: Lepidoptera
- Family: Crambidae
- Genus: Scoparia
- Species: S. caliginosa

Binomial name
- Scoparia caliginosa Philpott, 1918

= Scoparia caliginosa =

Species of moth

Scoparia caliginosa is a species of moth in the family Crambidae. It is endemic to New Zealand. In 2025 this species was classified as "data deficient" under the New Zealand Threat Classification System.

== Taxonomy ==
This species was described by Alfred Philpott in 1918. However the placement of this species within the genus Scoparia is in doubt. As a result, this species has also been referred to as Scoparia (s.l.) caliginosa.

== Description ==
The wingspan is about 17 mm (0.67 in). The forewings are ferruginous brown, sprinkled with whitish on the basal three-fourths. There is a short brown fascia from the costa at the base and the first line is paler and margined with ferruginous brown posteriorly. The second line is whitish, margined with ferruginous brown anteriorly. The hindwings are fuscous grey, but darker terminally.

== Conservation status ==
In 2025 this species was classified by the New Zealand Department of Conservation as "data deficient" under the New Zealand Threat Classification System. This species is data poor as a result of difficulties in identifying the species.
