= Scoparia caradjai =

Scientific classification
- Kingdom: Animalia
- Phylum: Arthropoda
- Class: Insecta
- Order: Lepidoptera
- Family: Crambidae
- Genus: Scoparia
- Species: S. caradjai

Binomial name
- Scoparia caradjai Leraut, 1986

Species of moth

Scoparia caradjai is a moth in the family Crambidae. It was described by Patrice J.A. Leraut in 1986. It is found in the Chinese provinces of Zhejiang, Jiangsu and Jiangxi.

The length of the forewings is 8–10.5 mm.
