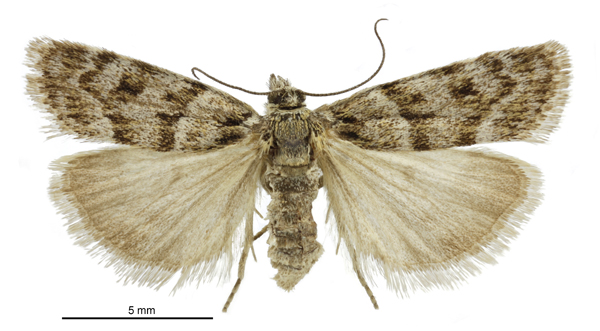
- Female
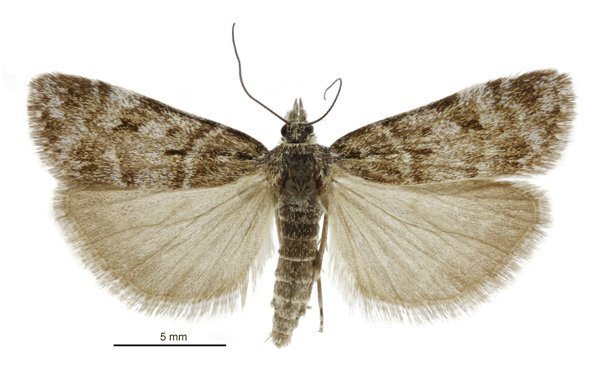
- Male

Scientific classification
- Kingdom: Animalia
- Phylum: Arthropoda
- Class: Insecta
- Order: Lepidoptera
- Family: Crambidae
- Genus: Scoparia
- Species: S. nomeutis

Binomial name
- Scoparia nomeutis (Meyrick, 1884)

Synonyms
- Xeroscopa nomeutis Meyrick, 1884

= Scoparia nomeutis =

Species of moth

Scoparia nomeutis is a moth in the family Crambidae. It was named by Edward Meyrick in 1884. Meyrick gave a description of this species in 1885. It is endemic to New Zealand.

The wingspan is 17–21 mm. The forewings are greyish-ochreous or fuscous, irrorated with white and with a few black scales. There is a suffused blackish spot in the middle of base and one on the inner margin near the base. The first line is whitish and blackish-margined posteriorly. The second line is also whitish, but blackish-margined anteriorly. The hindwings are fuscous-grey with a darker hindmargin. Adults have been recorded on wing in December.
