= Scoparia pulverulentellus =

Scientific classification
- Kingdom: Animalia
- Phylum: Arthropoda
- Clade: Pancrustacea
- Class: Insecta
- Order: Lepidoptera
- Family: Crambidae
- Genus: Scoparia
- Species: S. pulverulentellus

Binomial name
- Scoparia pulverulentellus (Zeller, 1872)

Synonyms
- Crambus pulverulentellus Zeller, 1872

Species of moth

Scoparia pulverulentellus is a moth in the family Crambidae. It was described by Philipp Christoph Zeller in 1872. It is found in Colombia.
