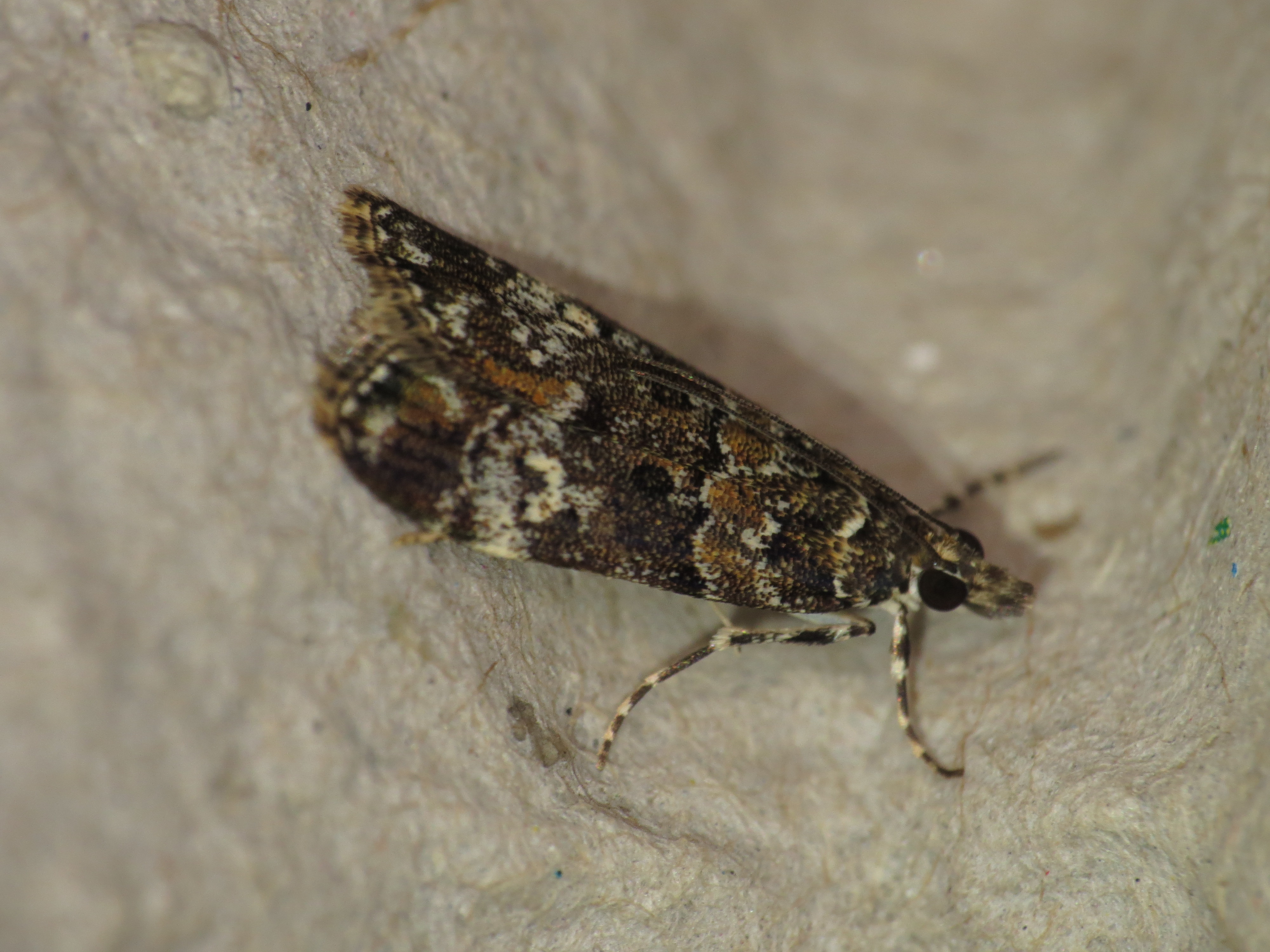
- Scoparia gethosyna Turner, 1922, to actinic light, Blackheath, NSW, 8/9 November 2014

Scientific classification
- Kingdom: Animalia
- Phylum: Arthropoda
- Class: Insecta
- Order: Lepidoptera
- Family: Crambidae
- Genus: Scoparia
- Species: S. gethosyna

Binomial name
- Scoparia gethosyna Turner, 1922

= Scoparia gethosyna =

Species of moth

Scoparia gethosyna is a moth in the family Crambidae. It was described by Turner in 1922. It is found in Australia, where it has been recorded from Queensland.

The wingspan is about 20 mm. The forewings are brownish-orange with a large basal dark-fuscous spot and a whitish line from the costa to the dorsum. There is a squarish dark fuscous blotch on the costa and a whitish fascia beyond this, containing some fuscous scales. The hindwings are ochreous-whitish. Adults have been recorded on wing in December.
