= Scoparia dominicki =

Scientific classification
- Kingdom: Animalia
- Phylum: Arthropoda
- Class: Insecta
- Order: Lepidoptera
- Family: Crambidae
- Genus: Scoparia
- Species: S. dominicki

Binomial name
- Scoparia dominicki Munroe, 1972

Species of moth

Scoparia dominicki is a moth in the family Crambidae. It was described by Eugene G. Munroe in 1972. It is found in North America, where it has been recorded from Florida, North Carolina, Oklahoma, South Carolina and West Virginia.

Adults are on wing from April to May and in November.
