= Scoparia oxygona =

Scientific classification
- Kingdom: Animalia
- Phylum: Arthropoda
- Class: Insecta
- Order: Lepidoptera
- Family: Crambidae
- Genus: Scoparia
- Species: S. oxygona

Binomial name
- Scoparia oxygona Meyrick, 1897

Species of moth

Scoparia oxygona is a moth in the family Crambidae. It was described by Edward Meyrick in 1897. It is found in Australia, where it has been recorded from Tasmania.
