= Scoparia obsoleta =

Scientific classification
- Kingdom: Animalia
- Phylum: Arthropoda
- Class: Insecta
- Order: Lepidoptera
- Family: Crambidae
- Genus: Scoparia
- Species: S. obsoleta

Binomial name
- Scoparia obsoleta Staudinger, 1879

Species of moth

Scoparia obsoleta is a moth in the family Crambidae. It was described by Staudinger in 1879. It is found in Turkey.
