= Scoparia metaleucalis =

Scientific classification
- Kingdom: Animalia
- Phylum: Arthropoda
- Class: Insecta
- Order: Lepidoptera
- Family: Crambidae
- Genus: Scoparia
- Species: S. metaleucalis

Binomial name
- Scoparia metaleucalis Hampson, 1907

Species of moth

Scoparia metaleucalis is a moth in the family Crambidae. It was described by George Hampson in 1907. It is found in Sichuan, China.

The length of the forewings is 7–8 mm.
