= Scoparia largispinea =

Scientific classification
- Kingdom: Animalia
- Phylum: Arthropoda
- Clade: Pancrustacea
- Class: Insecta
- Order: Lepidoptera
- Family: Crambidae
- Genus: Scoparia
- Species: S. largispinea

Binomial name
- Scoparia largispinea W.-C. Li, H.-H. Li & Nuss, 2010

Species of moth

Scoparia largispinea is a moth in the family Crambidae. It was described by Wei-Chun Li, Hou-Hun Li and Matthias Nuss in 2010. It is found in the Chinese provinces of Guizhou and Henan.

The length of the forewings is 6–8 mm.
