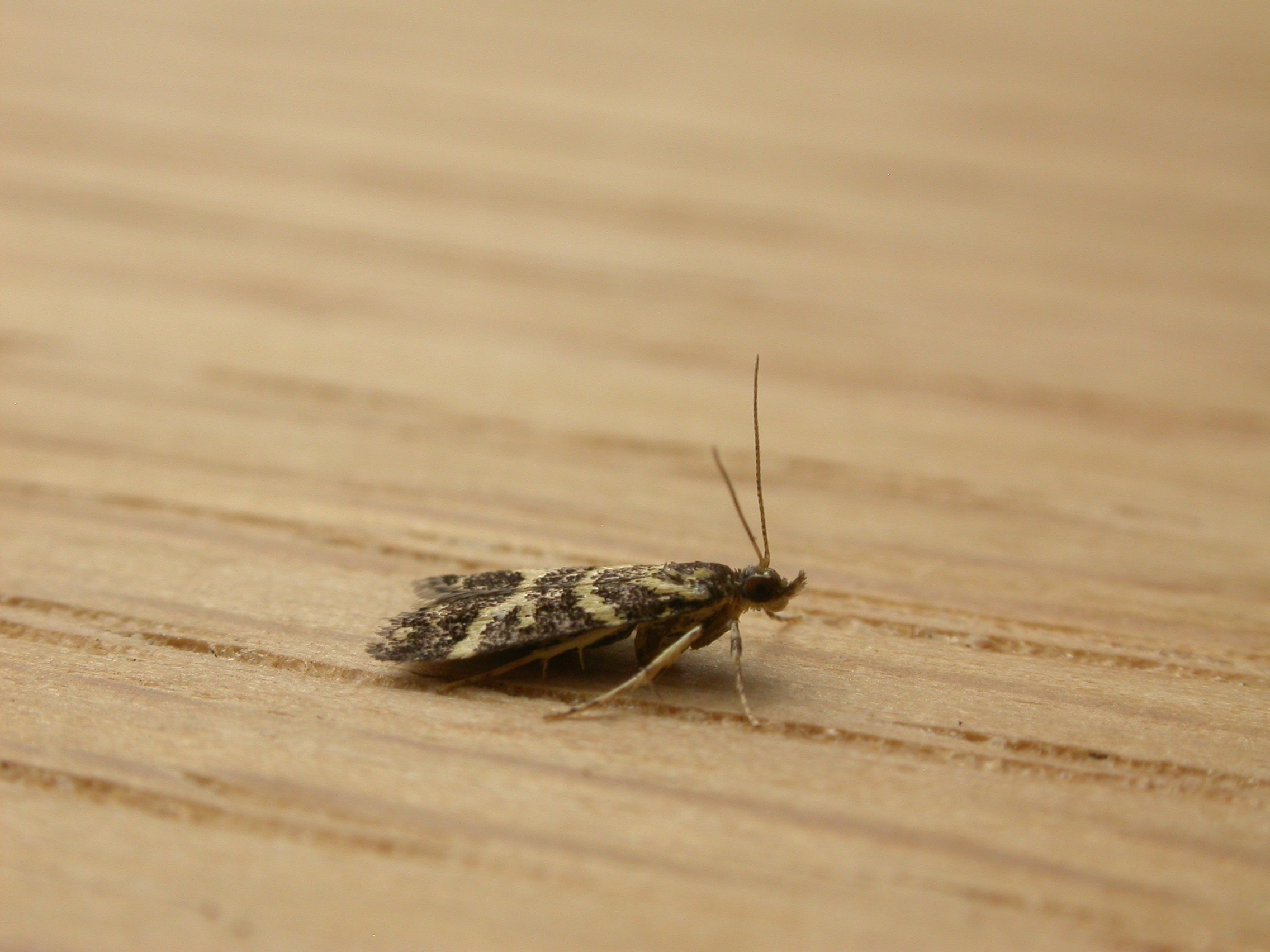

Scientific classification
- Kingdom: Animalia
- Phylum: Arthropoda
- Class: Insecta
- Order: Lepidoptera
- Family: Crambidae
- Genus: Scoparia
- Species: S. spelaea

Binomial name
- Scoparia spelaea Meyrick, 1884

Synonyms
- Scoparia pusilla Rosenstock, 1885

= Scoparia spelaea =

Species of moth

Scoparia spelaea is a species of moth of the family Crambidae. It is found in Australia.
