= Scoparia glauculalis =

Scientific classification
- Kingdom: Animalia
- Phylum: Arthropoda
- Class: Insecta
- Order: Lepidoptera
- Family: Crambidae
- Genus: Scoparia
- Species: S. glauculalis

Binomial name
- Scoparia glauculalis Hampson, 1897

Species of moth

Scoparia glauculalis is a moth in the family Crambidae. It was described by George Hampson in 1897. It is found on the Falkland Islands.

The wingspan is about 20 mm. Adults are olive grey, the forewings with a glossy silky texture. There are traces of yellowish marks at the middle and end of the cell. The outer area is slightly darker.
