= Scoparia crocalis =

Scientific classification
- Kingdom: Animalia
- Phylum: Arthropoda
- Clade: Pancrustacea
- Class: Insecta
- Order: Lepidoptera
- Family: Crambidae
- Genus: Scoparia
- Species: S. crocalis

Binomial name
- Scoparia crocalis Hampson, 1903

Species of moth

Scoparia crocalis is a moth in the family Crambidae. It was described by George Hampson in 1903. It is found in India's Nilgiri Mountains.
