= Scoparia anadonta =

Scientific classification
- Kingdom: Animalia
- Phylum: Arthropoda
- Class: Insecta
- Order: Lepidoptera
- Family: Crambidae
- Genus: Scoparia
- Species: S. anadonta

Binomial name
- Scoparia anadonta Dyar, 1918

Species of moth

Scoparia anadonta is a moth in the family Crambidae. It was described by Harrison Gray Dyar Jr. in 1918. It is found in Hidalgo, Mexico.

The wingspan is about 23 mm. The forewings are yellowish grey, irrorated (speckled) with black. The discal mark is filled with reddish and the outer line is whitish. The terminal area is blackish. The hindwings are dirty whitish.
