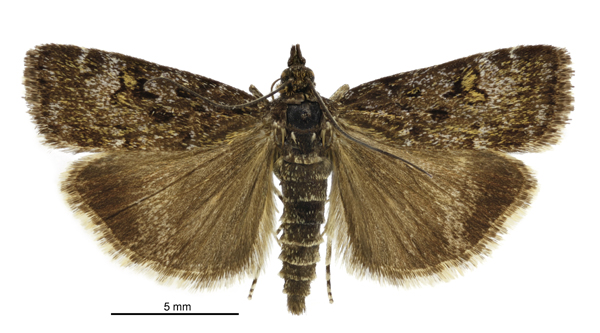
- Male

Scientific classification
- Kingdom: Animalia
- Phylum: Arthropoda
- Class: Insecta
- Order: Lepidoptera
- Family: Crambidae
- Genus: Scoparia
- Species: S. lychnophanes

Binomial name
- Scoparia lychnophanes Meyrick, 1927

= Scoparia lychnophanes =

Species of moth

Scoparia lychnophanes is a species of moth in the family Crambidae. It is endemic to New Zealand.

== Taxonomy ==
It was first described by Edward Meyrick in 1927. However the placement of this species within the genus Scoparia is in doubt. As a result, this species has also been referred to as Scoparia (s.l.) lychnophanes.

== Description ==
The wingspan is about 22 mm. The forewings are dark fuscous with some scattered whitish and ochreous scales. The first and second lines are indicated by shades of scattered white-scales. The hindwings are grey, somewhat darker posteriorly. Adults have been recorded on wing in January.
