= Scoparia pulveralis =

Scientific classification
- Kingdom: Animalia
- Phylum: Arthropoda
- Class: Insecta
- Order: Lepidoptera
- Family: Crambidae
- Genus: Scoparia
- Species: S. pulveralis

Binomial name
- Scoparia pulveralis Snellen, 1890

Species of moth

Scoparia pulveralis is a moth in the family Crambidae. It was described by Snellen in 1890. It is found in India (Darjeeling).
