= Scoparia melanoxantha =

Scientific classification
- Kingdom: Animalia
- Phylum: Arthropoda
- Class: Insecta
- Order: Lepidoptera
- Family: Crambidae
- Genus: Scoparia
- Species: S. melanoxantha

Binomial name
- Scoparia melanoxantha Turner, 1922

Species of moth

Scoparia melanoxantha is a moth in the family Crambidae. It was described by Turner in 1922. It is found in Australia, where it has been recorded from Queensland.

The wingspan is 18–19 mm. The forewings are yellow with blackish markings. The hindwings are ochreous-whitish, suffused with grey towards the termen. Adults have been recorded on wing in December.
