= Scoparia nigripunctalis =

Scientific classification
- Kingdom: Animalia
- Phylum: Arthropoda
- Class: Insecta
- Order: Lepidoptera
- Family: Crambidae
- Genus: Scoparia
- Species: S. nigripunctalis

Binomial name
- Scoparia nigripunctalis Maes, 2004

Species of moth

Scoparia nigripunctalis is a moth in the family Crambidae. It was described by Koen V. N. Maes in 2004. It is found in Kenya.
