= Scoparia ignicola =

Scientific classification
- Kingdom: Animalia
- Phylum: Arthropoda
- Class: Insecta
- Order: Lepidoptera
- Family: Crambidae
- Genus: Scoparia
- Species: S. ignicola

Binomial name
- Scoparia ignicola (Staudinger, 1899)

Synonyms
- Crambus ignicola Staudinger, 1899

Species of moth

Scoparia ignicola is a moth in the family Crambidae. It was described by Otto Staudinger in 1899. It is found in Argentina.

The wingspan is 19–20 mm. The forewings are dirty light grey, sprinkled with dark. The hindwings are light grey.
