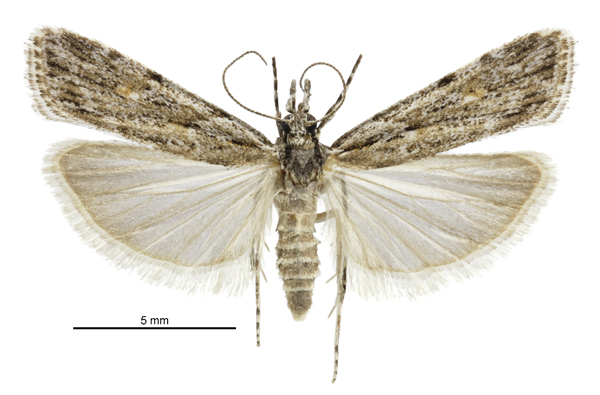
- Female

Scientific classification
- Kingdom: Animalia
- Phylum: Arthropoda
- Class: Insecta
- Order: Lepidoptera
- Family: Crambidae
- Genus: Scoparia
- Species: S. chalicodes

Binomial name
- Scoparia chalicodes Meyrick, 1884

Synonyms
- Scoparia ciserodes Meyrick, 1920

= Scoparia chalicodes =

Species of moth

Scoparia chalicodes is a species of moth in the family Crambidae. This species was named by Edward Meyrick in 1884. Meyrick gave a fuller description of this species in 1885. S. chalicodes is endemic to New Zealand.

The wingspan is 15.5–16.5 mm. The forewings are light ochreous-grey, irrorated with white. The veins are irregularly and partially lined with blackish. The first line is pale greyish-ochreous, obscurely dark-margined. The second line is very obscure and the subterminal line is cloudy and whitish. The hindwings are grey-whitish. Adults have been recorded on wing from January to March.
