= Scoparia murificalis =

Scientific classification
- Kingdom: Animalia
- Phylum: Arthropoda
- Class: Insecta
- Order: Lepidoptera
- Family: Crambidae
- Genus: Scoparia
- Species: S. murificalis

Binomial name
- Scoparia murificalis Walker, 1859

Species of moth

Scoparia murificalis is a moth in the family Crambidae. It was described by Francis Walker in 1859. It is found in Sri Lanka.
