= Scoparia phaealis =

Scientific classification
- Kingdom: Animalia
- Phylum: Arthropoda
- Class: Insecta
- Order: Lepidoptera
- Family: Crambidae
- Genus: Scoparia
- Species: S. phaealis

Binomial name
- Scoparia phaealis Hampson, 1903

Species of moth

Scoparia phaealis is a moth in the family Crambidae. It is found in India.
