= Scoparia termobola =

Scientific classification
- Kingdom: Animalia
- Phylum: Arthropoda
- Class: Insecta
- Order: Lepidoptera
- Family: Crambidae
- Genus: Scoparia
- Species: S. termobola

Binomial name
- Scoparia termobola Meyrick, 1938

Species of moth

Scoparia termobola is a moth in the family Crambidae. It was described by Edward Meyrick in 1938. It is found on the island of Java in Indonesia.
