= Scoparia indica =

Scientific classification
- Kingdom: Animalia
- Phylum: Arthropoda
- Class: Insecta
- Order: Lepidoptera
- Family: Crambidae
- Genus: Scoparia
- Species: S. indica

Binomial name
- Scoparia indica Leraut, 1986

Species of moth

Scoparia indica is a moth in the family Crambidae. It was described by Patrice J.A. Leraut in 1986. It is found in Uttar Pradesh, India.
