= Scoparia saerdabella =

Scientific classification
- Kingdom: Animalia
- Phylum: Arthropoda
- Class: Insecta
- Order: Lepidoptera
- Family: Crambidae
- Genus: Scoparia
- Species: S. saerdabella

Binomial name
- Scoparia saerdabella Osthelder, 1938

Synonyms
- Scoparia hyrcanella Toll, 1948

Species of moth

Scoparia saerdabella is a moth in the family Crambidae. It was described by Osthelder in 1938. It is found in Iran.
