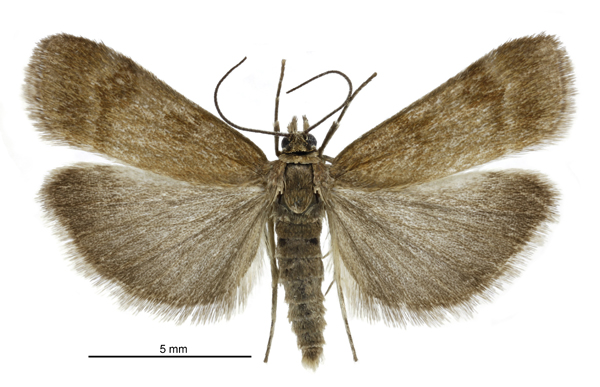
- Male

Scientific classification
- Kingdom: Animalia
- Phylum: Arthropoda
- Class: Insecta
- Order: Lepidoptera
- Family: Crambidae
- Genus: Scoparia
- Species: S. ergatis

Binomial name
- Scoparia ergatis Meyrick, 1884

= Scoparia ergatis =

Species of moth

Scoparia ergatis is a species of moth in the family Crambidae. It is endemic to New Zealand.

== Taxonomy ==
This species was named by Edward Meyrick in 1884. Meyrick gave a description of the species in 1885. However the placement of this species within the genus Scoparia is in doubt. As a result, this species has also been referred to as Scoparia (s.l.) ergatis.

== Description ==
The wingspan is 13–17 mm. The forewings are light fuscous, thinly and irregularly irrorated with whitish and darker fuscous. The first line is whitish, posteriorly dark-margined. The second line is also whitish, but dark-margined anteriorly. The hindwings are light grey or fuscous-grey, but darker posteriorly. Adults have been recorded on wing in January.
