= Scoparia tristicta =

Scientific classification
- Kingdom: Animalia
- Phylum: Arthropoda
- Class: Insecta
- Order: Lepidoptera
- Family: Crambidae
- Genus: Scoparia
- Species: S. tristicta

Binomial name
- Scoparia tristicta Turner, 1922

Species of moth

Scoparia tristicta is a moth in the genus Scoparia and the family Crambidae. It was described by Alfred Jefferis Turner in 1922. It is found in Australia, where it has been recorded from New South Wales.

The wingspan of this species is about 21 mm. The forewings are grey with slight dark-fuscous irroration (sprinkling) and with dark-fuscous markings. The hindwings are whitish. Adults have been recorded on wing in January.
