= Scoparia matuta =

Scientific classification
- Kingdom: Animalia
- Phylum: Arthropoda
- Class: Insecta
- Order: Lepidoptera
- Family: Crambidae
- Genus: Scoparia
- Species: S. matuta

Binomial name
- Scoparia matuta J. F. G. Clarke, 1965

Species of moth

Scoparia matuta is a moth in the family Crambidae. It was described by John Frederick Gates Clarke in the year 1965. It is found on the Juan Fernandez Archipelago in Chile.
