= Scoparia gomphota =

Scientific classification
- Kingdom: Animalia
- Phylum: Arthropoda
- Class: Insecta
- Order: Lepidoptera
- Family: Crambidae
- Genus: Scoparia
- Species: S. gomphota

Binomial name
- Scoparia gomphota Meyrick, 1885

Species of moth

Scoparia gomphota is a moth in the family Crambidae. It was described by Edward Meyrick in 1885. It is found in Australia, where it has been recorded from Tasmania.

The wingspan is about 15 mm. The forewings are fuscous grey, with a few black and bluish-white scales. There is a small reddish-ochreous spot near the base. The first line is blackish margined posteriorly, while the second line is blackish margined anteriorly. The terminal area is irrorated (sprinkled) with black, except for the subterminal line. The hindwings are grey, but darker on the hindmargin. Adults have been recorded on wing in February.
