= Scoparia contempta =

Scientific classification
- Kingdom: Animalia
- Phylum: Arthropoda
- Class: Insecta
- Order: Lepidoptera
- Family: Crambidae
- Genus: Scoparia
- Species: S. contempta

Binomial name
- Scoparia contempta (Turner, 1927)

Synonyms
- Platytes contempta Turner, 1927

Species of moth

Scoparia contempta is a moth in the family Crambidae. It was described by Turner in 1927. It is found in Australia, where it has been recorded from Tasmania.
