= Scoparia antarcticalis =

Scientific classification
- Kingdom: Animalia
- Phylum: Arthropoda
- Clade: Pancrustacea
- Class: Insecta
- Order: Lepidoptera
- Family: Crambidae
- Genus: Scoparia
- Species: S. antarcticalis

Binomial name
- Scoparia antarcticalis Staudinger, 1899

Species of moth

Scoparia antarcticalis is a moth in the family Crambidae. It was described by Otto Staudinger in 1899. It is found in Patagonia.

The wingspan is about 24 mm. The forewings are light yellowish to dirty whitish-grey, but darker at the base. The hindwings are uniform dirty whitish-grey, with a slightly darker apical area.
