= Scoparia mediorufalis =

Scientific classification
- Kingdom: Animalia
- Phylum: Arthropoda
- Class: Insecta
- Order: Lepidoptera
- Family: Crambidae
- Genus: Scoparia
- Species: S. mediorufalis

Binomial name
- Scoparia mediorufalis Hampson, 1896

Species of moth

Scoparia mediorufalis is a moth in the family Crambidae. It was described by George Hampson in 1896. It is found in Dharmsala, India.
