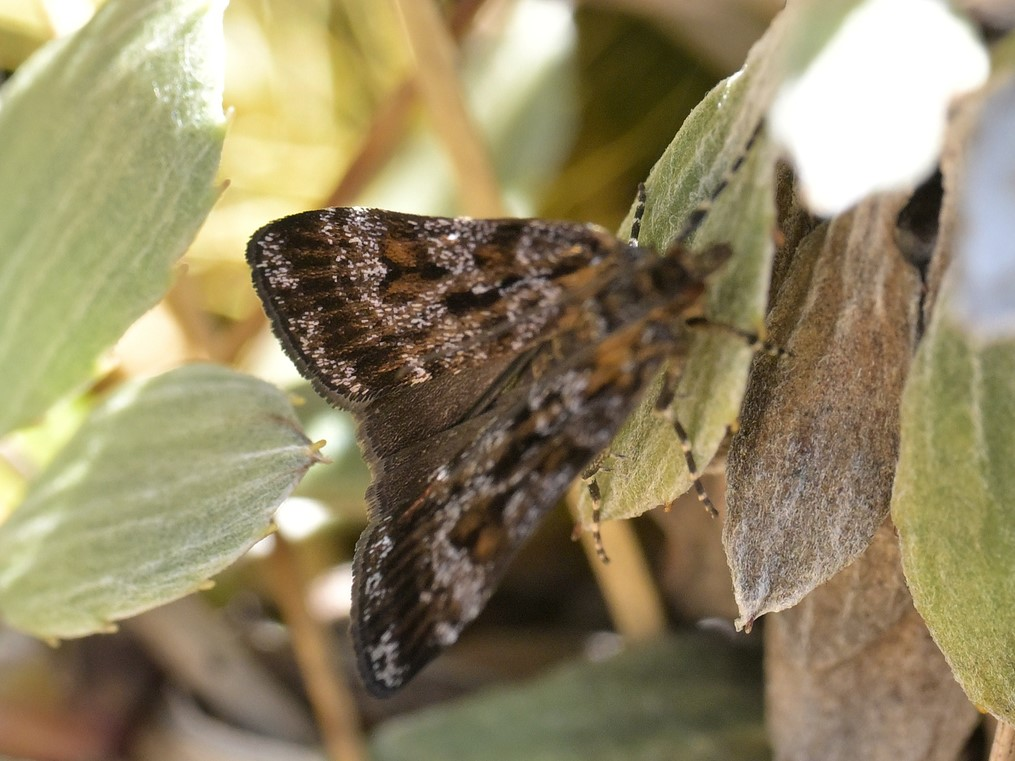

Scientific classification
- Kingdom: Animalia
- Phylum: Arthropoda
- Class: Insecta
- Order: Lepidoptera
- Family: Crambidae
- Genus: Scoparia
- Species: S. encapna

Binomial name
- Scoparia encapna Meyrick, 1888

= Scoparia encapna =

Species of moth

Scoparia encapna is a species of moth in the family Crambidae. It was first described by Edward Meyrick in 1888. It is endemic to New Zealand.

== Description ==
The wingspan is 18–20 mm. The forewings are dark glossy fuscous with bronzy reflections and a few scattered white scales. The veins are partially marked with black. The first line is whitish and black-margined posteriorly. The second line is also whitish, but dark-margined anteriorly. The hindwings are fuscous-grey, with a suffused dark fuscous hindmarginal band. Adults have been recorded on wing in January.
