= Scoparia anagantis =

Scientific classification
- Kingdom: Animalia
- Phylum: Arthropoda
- Class: Insecta
- Order: Lepidoptera
- Family: Crambidae
- Genus: Scoparia
- Species: S. anagantis

Binomial name
- Scoparia anagantis Dyar, 1918

Species of moth

Scoparia anagantis is a moth in the family Crambidae. It was described by Harrison Gray Dyar Jr. in 1918. It is found in Zacualpan, Mexico.

The wingspan is about 18 mm. The forewings are pale yellowish grey with a black dot on the costa and one on the submedian fold. The hindwings are dirty whitish.
