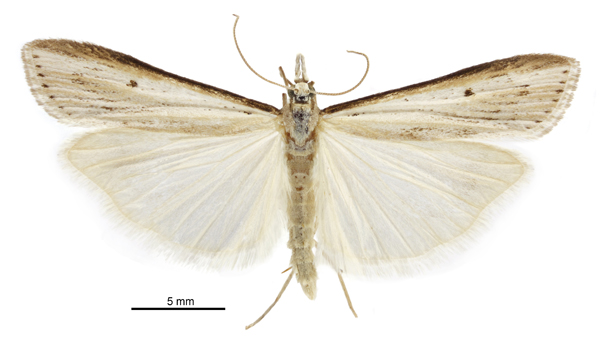
- Male

Scientific classification
- Kingdom: Animalia
- Phylum: Arthropoda
- Class: Insecta
- Order: Lepidoptera
- Family: Crambidae
- Genus: Scoparia
- Species: S. niphospora

Binomial name
- Scoparia niphospora (Meyrick, 1884)

Synonyms
- Xeroscopa niphospora Meyrick, 1884

= Scoparia niphospora =

Species of moth

Scoparia niphospora is a moth in the family Crambidae. It is endemic to New Zealand.

== Taxonomy ==
This species was described by Edward Meyrick in 1884. Meyrick gave a more detailed description of the species in 1885. Meyrick placed this species within the genus Scopaira in 1913. However the placement of this species within Scoparia is in doubt. As a result, this species has also been referred to as Scoparia (s.l.) niphospora.

== Description ==
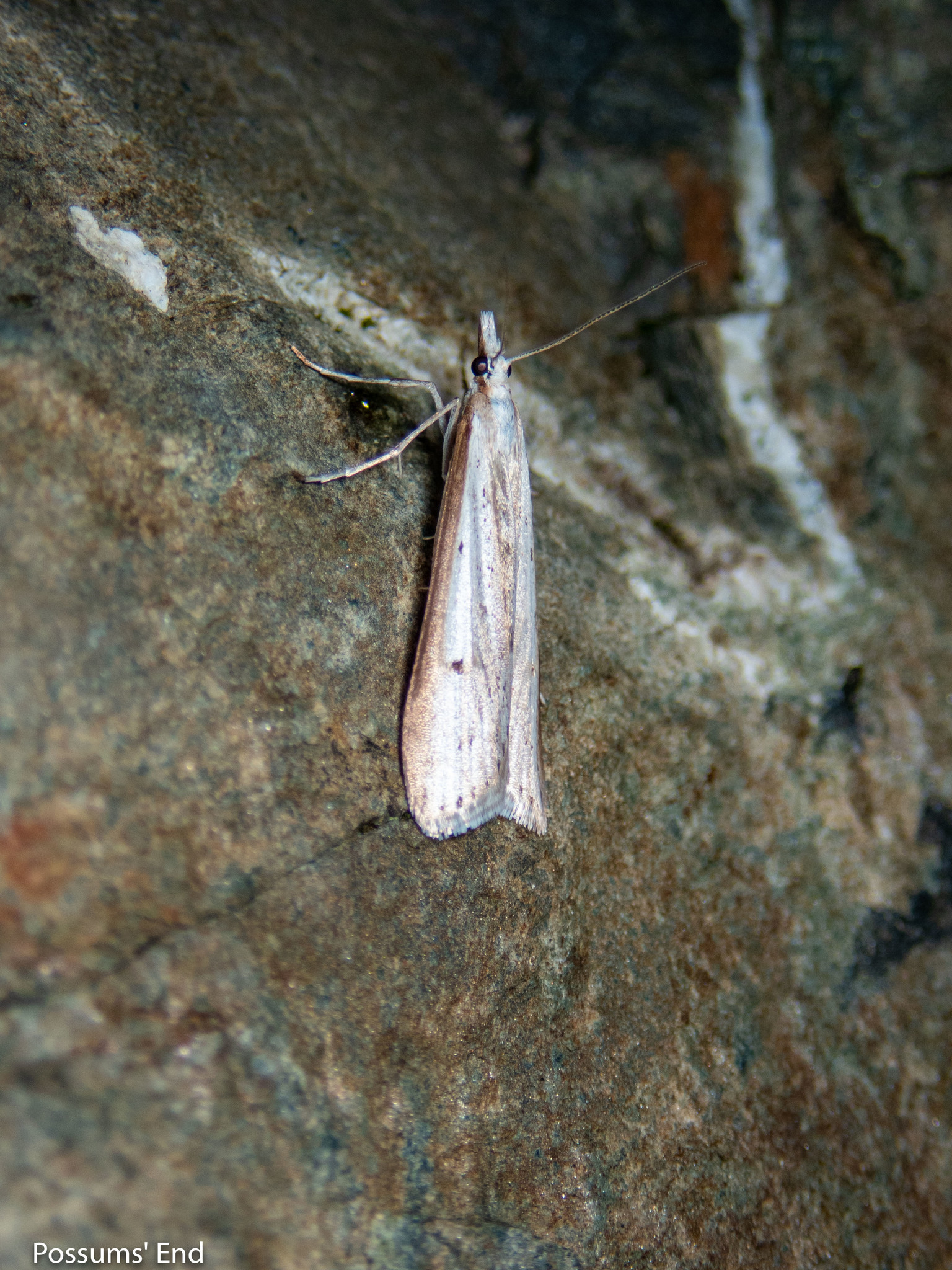
Observation of S. niphospora.

The wingspan is 26–29 mm. The forewings are light greyish-ochreous, irrorated with white except along the costa. The costa are dark fuscous with a few scattered dark fuscous scales. The veins are somewhat marked with dark fuscous posteriorly. There is a hindmarginal row of black dots. The hindwings are very pale whitish-ochreous. Adults have been recorded on wing in January.
