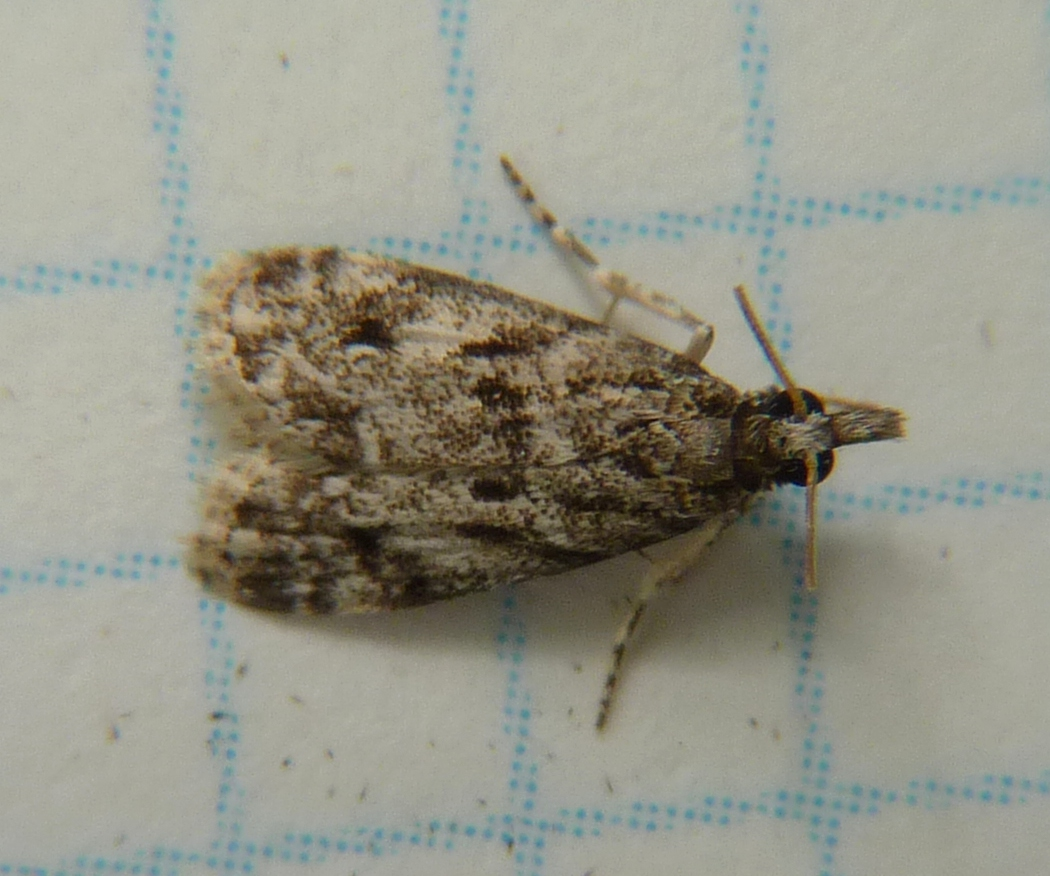

Scientific classification
- Kingdom: Animalia
- Phylum: Arthropoda
- Clade: Pancrustacea
- Class: Insecta
- Order: Lepidoptera
- Family: Crambidae
- Genus: Scoparia
- Species: S. basalis

Binomial name
- Scoparia basalis Walker, 1866

= Scoparia basalis =

Species of moth

Scoparia basalis, the many-spotted scoparia moth, is a moth of the family Crambidae. It is found in North America, including Arkansas, British Columbia, Georgia, Maine, Massachusetts, New Jersey, Oklahoma, Tennessee, Virginia and Washington.

The wingspan is about 13 mm.
