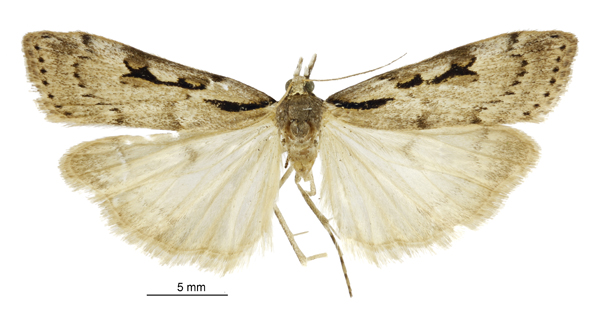
- Male

Scientific classification
- Kingdom: Animalia
- Phylum: Arthropoda
- Class: Insecta
- Order: Lepidoptera
- Family: Crambidae
- Genus: Scoparia
- Species: S. scripta

Binomial name
- Scoparia scripta Philpott, 1918

= Scoparia scripta =

Species of moth

Scoparia scripta is a species of moth in the family Crambidae. It is endemic in New Zealand and has been observed in the southern half of the South Island including in the Hunter Mountains and at Otira, Arthur's Pass and Mt Titiroa as well as in Deep Creek and Coronet Creek valleys near Coronet Peak. The species inhabits damp gullies. Adults are on the wing from January to March. Larvae feed on Epilobium species.

== Taxonomy ==
This species was described by Alfred Philpott in 1918 using specimens he collected at Mount Burns in the Hunter Mountains in Fiordland at an elevation of around 3000 ft. However the placement of this species within the genus Scoparia is in doubt. As a result, this species has also been referred to as Scoparia (s.l.) scripta. The male holotype specimen is held at the New Zealand Arthropod Collection.

== Description ==
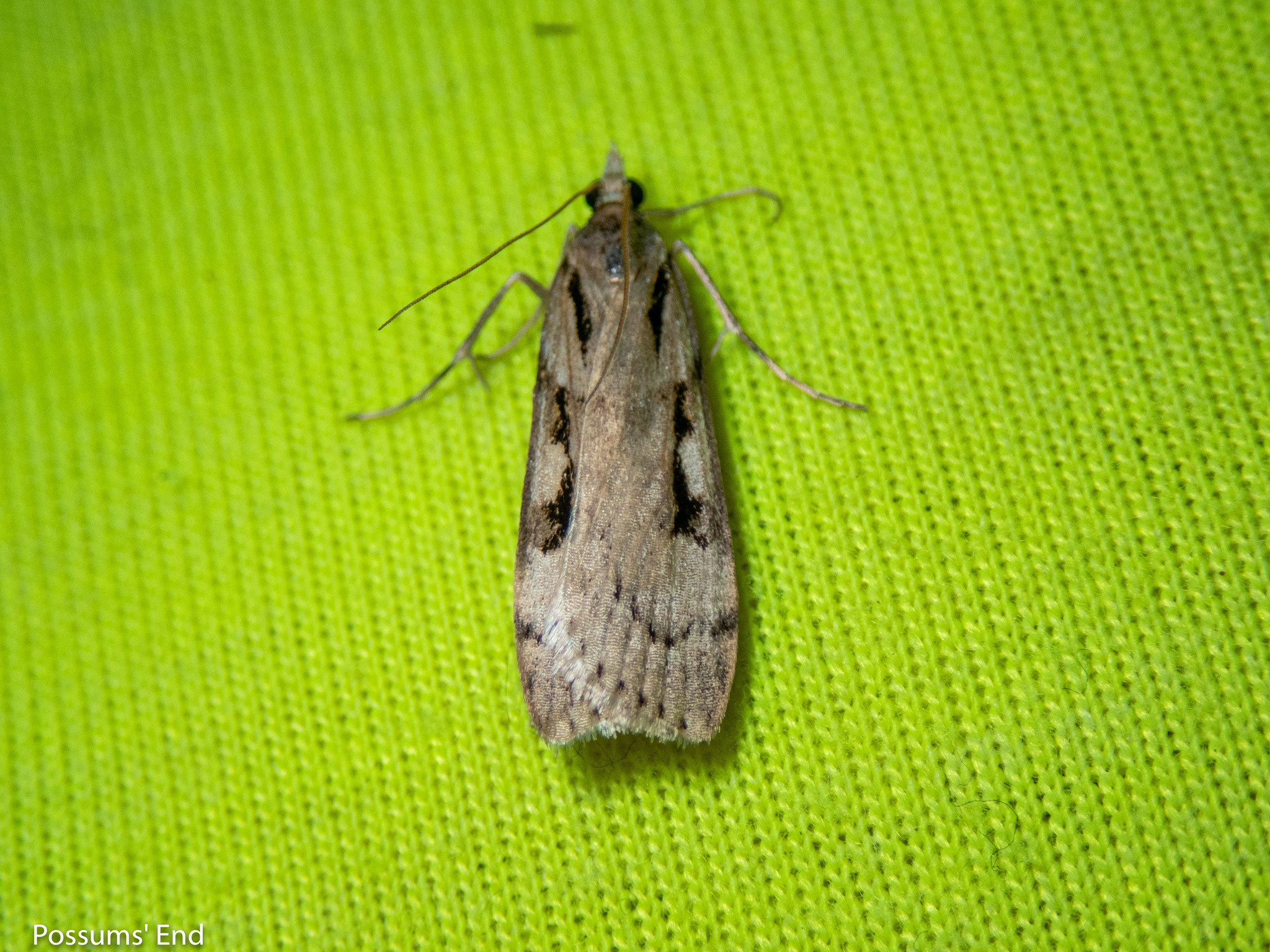

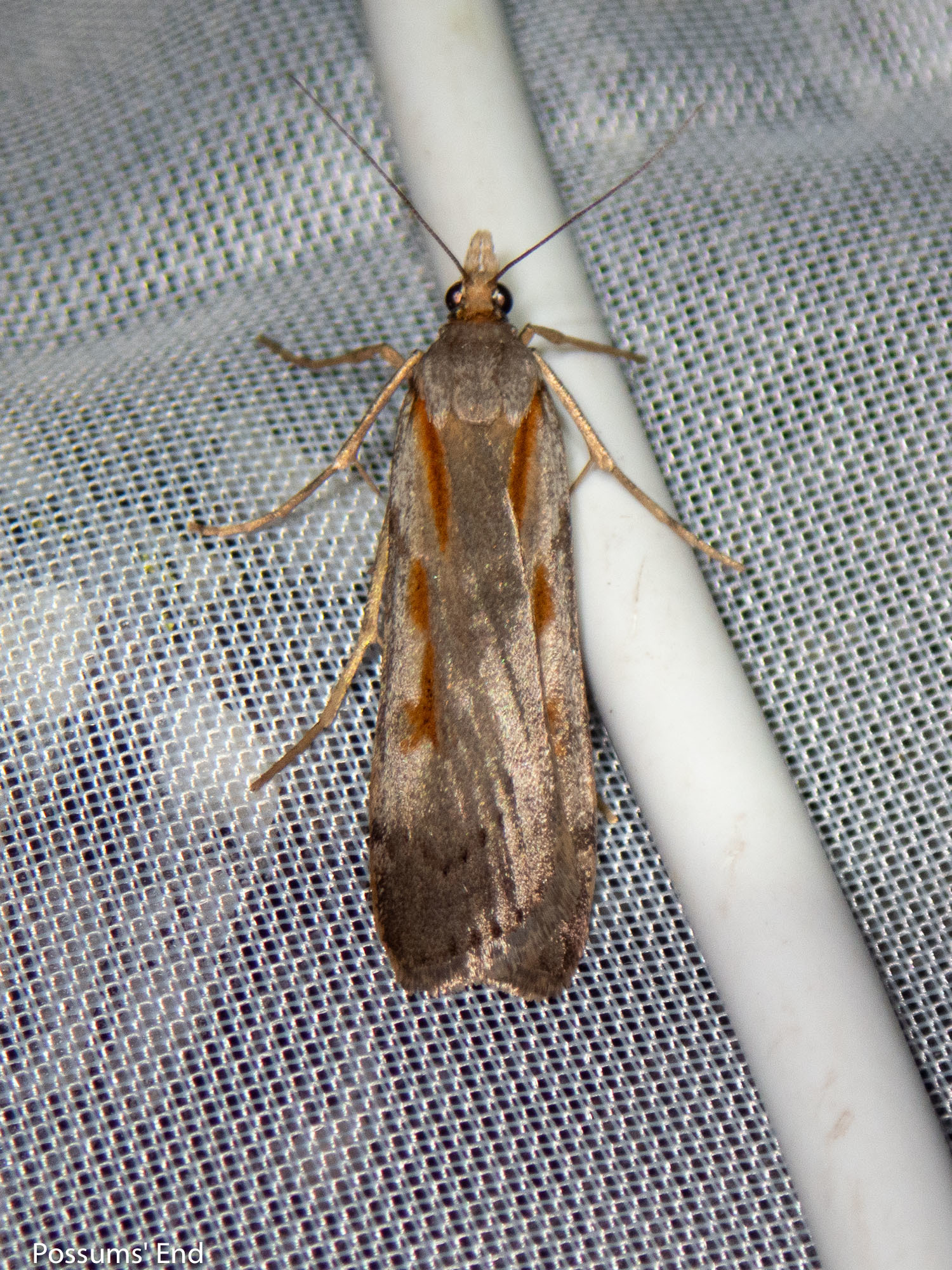
S. scripta yellow/orange form

The wingspan is 29–32 mm. The forewings are pale ochreous, sprinkled with fuscous and suffused with white on the costal half. There is a thick black basal streak from the costa and the first line is whitish, margined with fuscous posteriorly. The second line is whitish and preceded by a series of black dots. There is a series of roundish black dots on the termen. The hindwings are pale whitish-ochreous. Adults have been recorded on wing in January.

S. scripta is similar in appearance to S. rotuella but can be distinguished from that species as S. scripta has disconnected orbicular and reniform. This species is also similar in appearance to S. clavata but can be distinguished as S. scripta has an acutely pointed basal streak.

S. scripta also has a yellowish orange form.

== Distribution ==
This specie is endemic to New Zealand. Other than at its type locality this species has also been observed at Otira, Arthur's Pass, Mt Titiroa as well as in Deep Creek and Coronet Creek valleys.

== Behaviour ==
The adults of this species are on the wing in January to March. Adults have been observed basking on rocks and larvae have been seen on Epilobium species beside streams.

== Habitat and host species ==
This species inhabits damp gullies. The caterpillars of this moth feed on Epilobium species.
