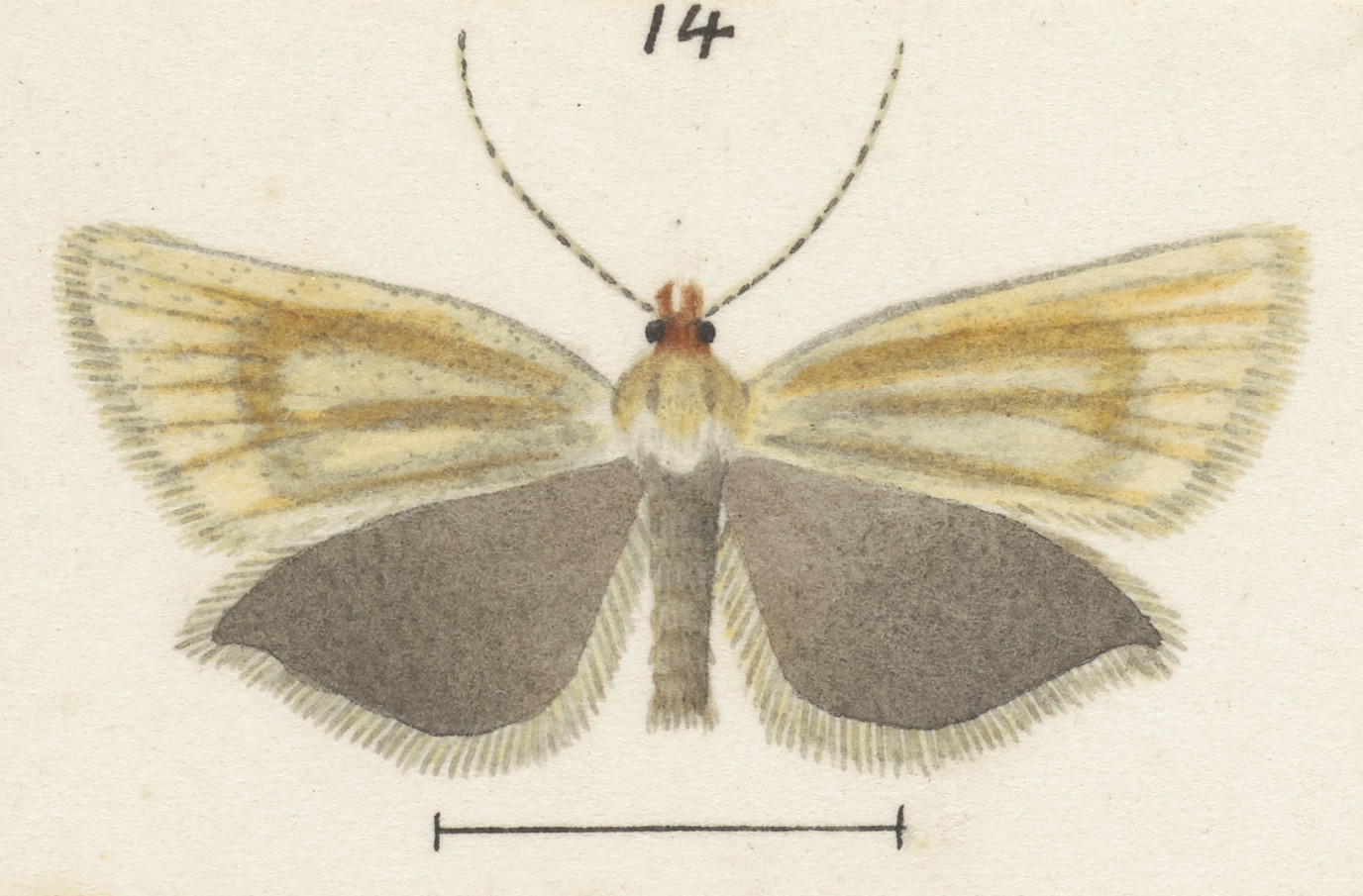

Scientific classification
- Kingdom: Animalia
- Phylum: Arthropoda
- Class: Insecta
- Order: Lepidoptera
- Family: Tortricidae
- Genus: Eurythecta
- Species: E. curva

Binomial name
- Eurythecta curva Philpott, 1918

= Eurythecta curva =

Species of moth endemic to New Zealand

Eurythecta curva is a species of moth of the family Tortricidae. This species was first described by Alfred Philpott in 1918. It is endemic to New Zealand.

== Taxonomy ==
This species was first described by Alfred Philpott in 1918 using a specimen collected by him at Mount Cleughearn in the Hunter Mountains in Fiordland at 3500 ft. E. curva is regarded as being taxonomically unresolved as it likely belongs to another genus. It is therefore also known as Eurythecta (s.l.) curva. The male holotype specimen is held at the New Zealand Arthropod Collection.

== Description ==
Philpott described this species as follows:

♂. 14-15 mm. Head and palpi ochreous. Antennae fuscous, ciliations 2 1/2. Thorax whitish-ochreous. Abdomen grey - whitish, anal tuft ochreous. Legs ochreous - whitish. Forewings, costa strongly arched at base, apex round-pointed, termen straight, oblique ochreous-whitish with scattered fuscous scales; a rather bright ochreous mark in disc above middle from 1/3 to 2/3; sometimes a similar but more obscure mark below middle; the fuscous scales sometimes tend to form lines on veins : cilia whitish-ochreous with two darker lines. Hindwings, termen markedly sinuate, greyish-fuscous : cilia as in forewings.

Similar in appearance to Eurythecta eremana but E. curva can be distinguished on its size and wing shape.

== Distribution ==
This species is endemic to New Zealand.

== Habitat ==
Adults have been observed flying over low lying herbage.

== Behaviour ==
Adults of this species are on the wing in January.
