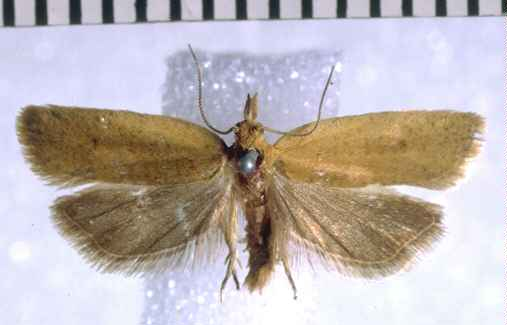
- Male holotype

Conservation status
- Nationally Endangered (NZ TCS)

Scientific classification
- Kingdom: Animalia
- Phylum: Arthropoda
- Clade: Pancrustacea
- Class: Insecta
- Order: Lepidoptera
- Family: Tortricidae
- Genus: Epichorista
- Species: E. lindsayi

Binomial name
- Epichorista lindsayi Philpott, 1928

= Epichorista lindsayi =

Species of moth

Epichorista lindsayi is a species of moth in the family Tortricidae. It is endemic to New Zealand and is found only on the Banks Peninsula. E. lindsayi inhabits grassy glades in lowland mature podocarp forest. It has an affinity for the plant species Microlaena polynoda and it is likely that this is the moth's larval host plant. Adults are on the wing in January and are day flying. In 2017 this species was classified as Nationally Endangered by the Department of Conservation.

== Taxonomy ==
This species was first described by Alfred Philpott in 1928 using specimens collected at Little River in Canterbury. It is named after the collector of the holotype, Stuart Lindsay. Lindsay collected two males of the species at Little River on 29 January 1928. George Vernon Hudson described and illustrated the species in his 1939 publication A supplement to the butterflies and moths of New Zealand. The genus level classification of New Zealand endemic moths within the genus Epichorista is regarded as unsatisfactory and is under revision. As such this species is currently also known as Epichorista (s.l.) lindsayi. The male holotype is held at the Canterbury Museum.

== Description ==
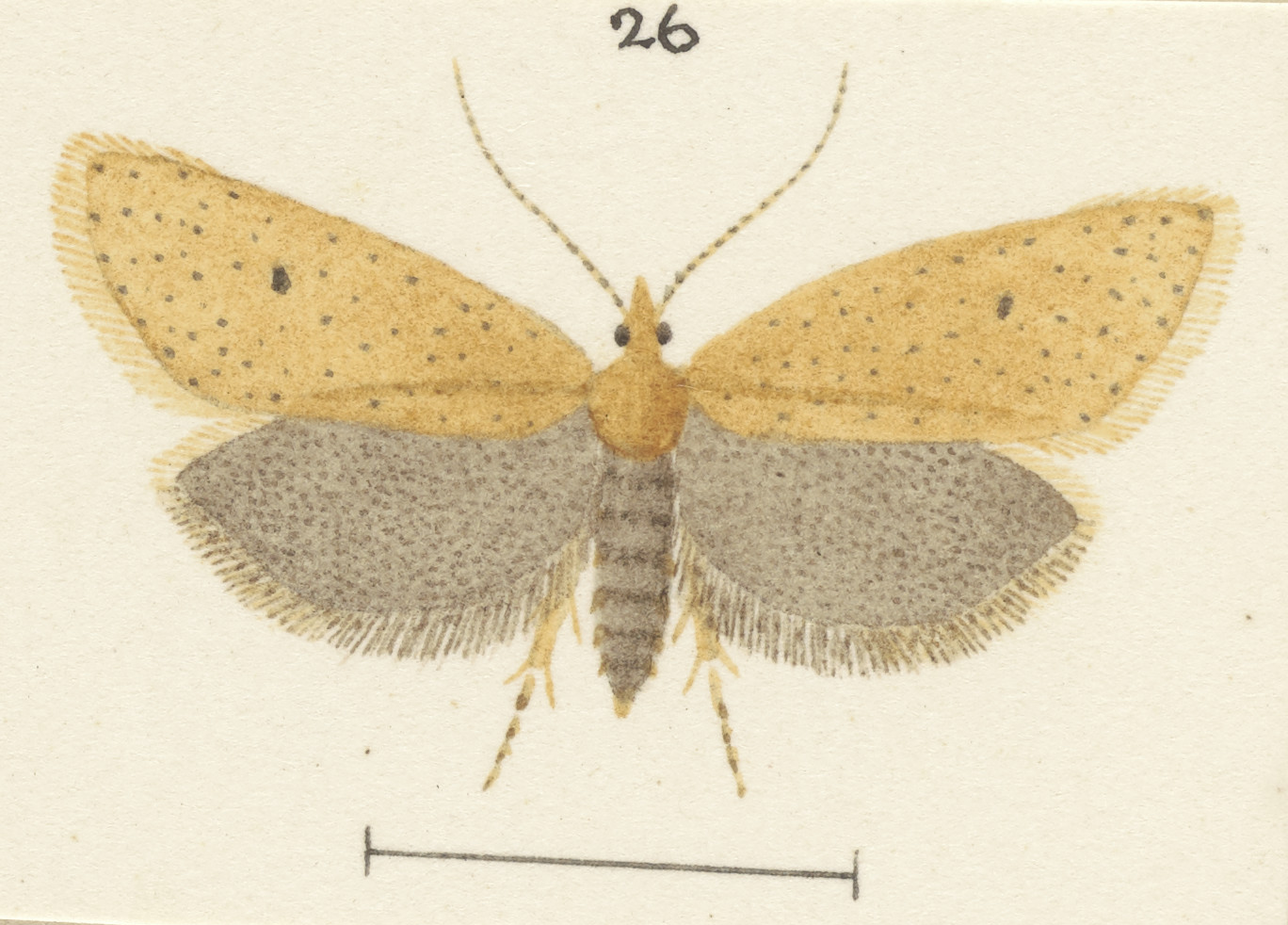
Illustration by Hudson

Philpott described this species as follows:

Male.—14-15mm. Head, palpi, and thorax bright ochreous, palpi moderately long. Antennae ochreous annulated with brown, ciliations in male almost 1. Abdomen fuscous mixed with ochreous. Legs ochreous, tarsi infuscated. Forewings moderately long, costa arched at base, thence straight, apex rounded, termen oblique; bright ochreous, slightly paler on costa towards base; fringes concolorous with wing. Hind wings fuscous; fringes fuscous with pale tips.

E. lindsayi is very similar in appearance to Eurythecta eremana but can be distinguished by the differences in the venational structure of its wings. It is also similar in appearance to Epichorista siriana but E. lindsayi may be distinguished by the longer palpi, the lighter forewings and the larger size. Hudson stated that the E. lindsayi could also be distinguished from those species as a result of the numerous minute black dots on its forewings.

== Distribution ==
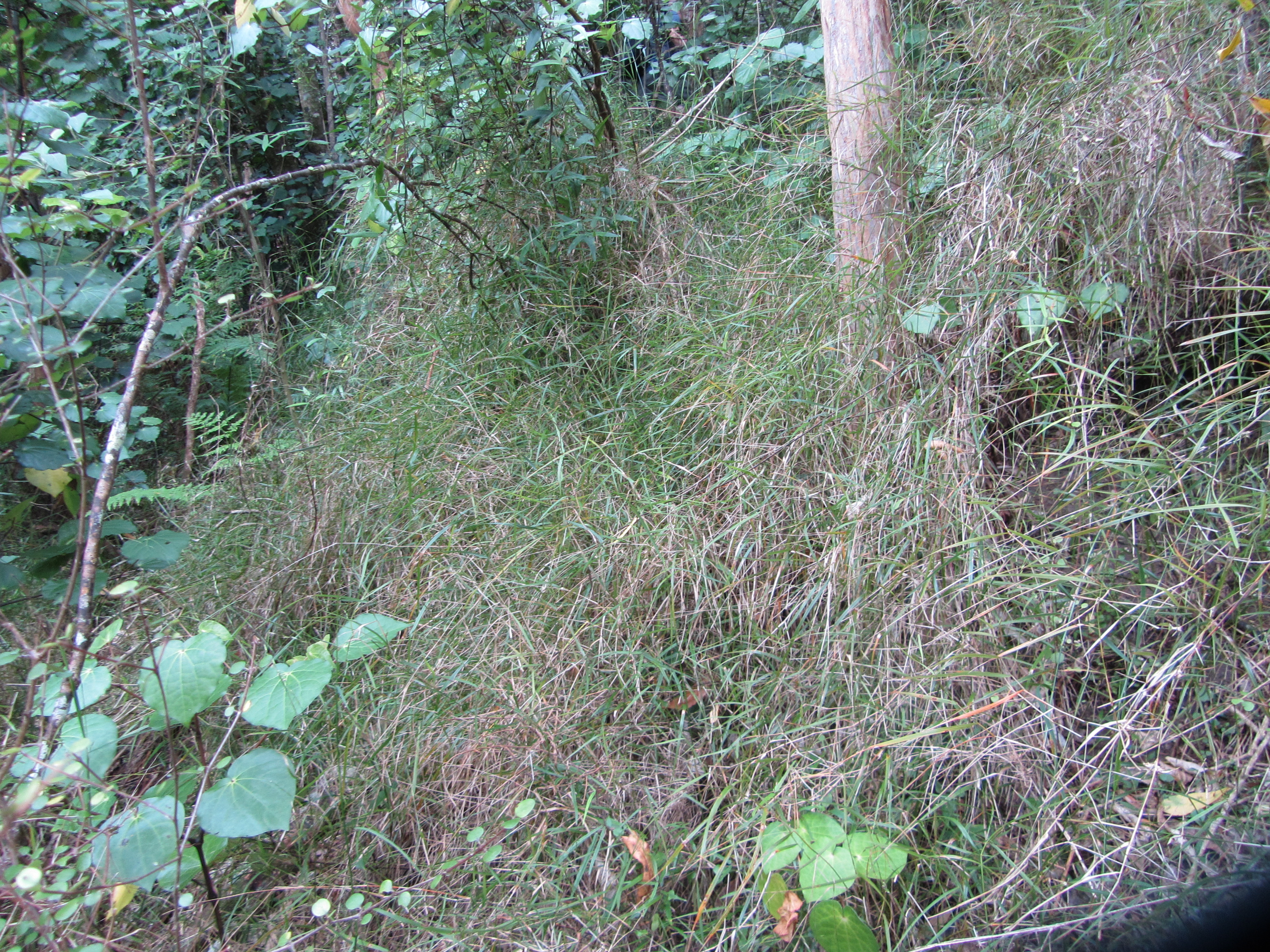
Microlaena polynoda

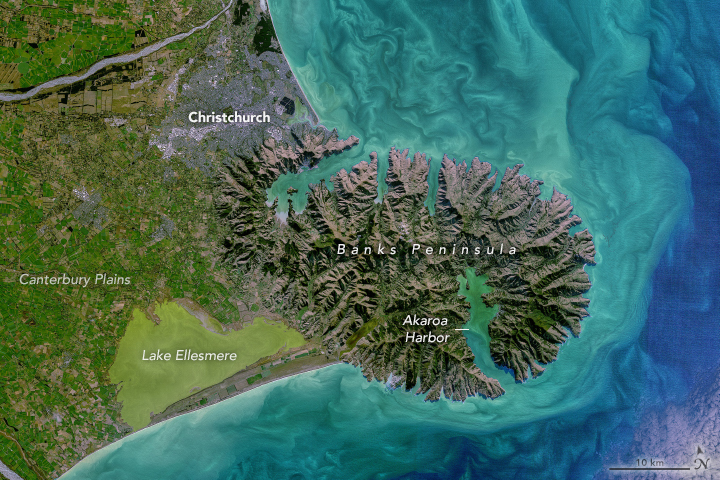
Banks Peninsula, type locality of E. lindsayi

This species is endemic to New Zealand. It has only ever been found on the Banks Peninsula. In 1982 Brian Patrick stated that this species had been collected at Danseys Pass in February. However in his subsequent publication in 2014 Patrick discussed this species as being "rediscovered" in 2014 at Wairewa Forest and made no mention of the Danseys Pass specimen.

== Habitat and hosts ==
This species occurs in grassy glades dominated by the plant species Microlaena polynoda in lowland mature podocarp forest. Microlaena polynoda is the likely larval host of E. lindsayi. In 2014 Patrick examined the leaves of this plant and found larval damage half way along the leaf. Inside the rolled leaf he found silk as well as larvae living inside.

== Behaviour ==
Adults of this species are on the wing in January. It is a day flying moth.

== Conservation status ==
E. lindsayi has been classified under the New Zealand Threat Classification system as being Nationally Endangered. It obtained this classification as it has only been located at one location with a total area of occupancy less than 10 ha and has a predicted decline of between 50–70%.
