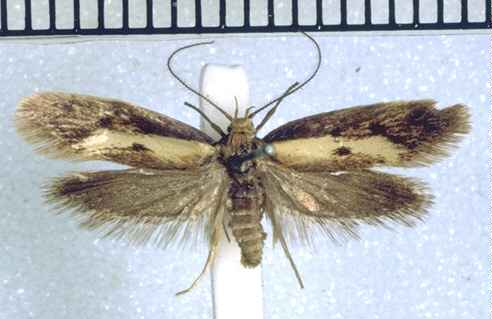
- Male holotype

Scientific classification
- Kingdom: Animalia
- Phylum: Arthropoda
- Class: Insecta
- Order: Lepidoptera
- Family: Oecophoridae
- Genus: Tingena
- Species: T. vestita

Binomial name
- Tingena vestita (Philpott, 1926)

Synonyms
- Borkhausenia vestita Philpott, 1926

= Tingena vestita =

Species of moth, endemic to New Zealand

Tingena vestita is a species of moth in the family Oecophoridae. It is endemic to New Zealand and has been collected in Fiordland. The adults of this species are on the wing in January.

== Taxonomy ==
This species was described by Alfred Philpott in 1926 using specimens collected in the Hunter Mountains in January by S. Lindsay. Philpott originally named the species Borkhausenia vestita. George Hudson discussed and illustrated this species under the name B. vestita in his 1928 publication The butterflies and moths of New Zealand. In 1988 J. S. Dugdale placed this species within the genus Tingena. The male holotype specimen is held at the Canterbury Museum.

== Description ==
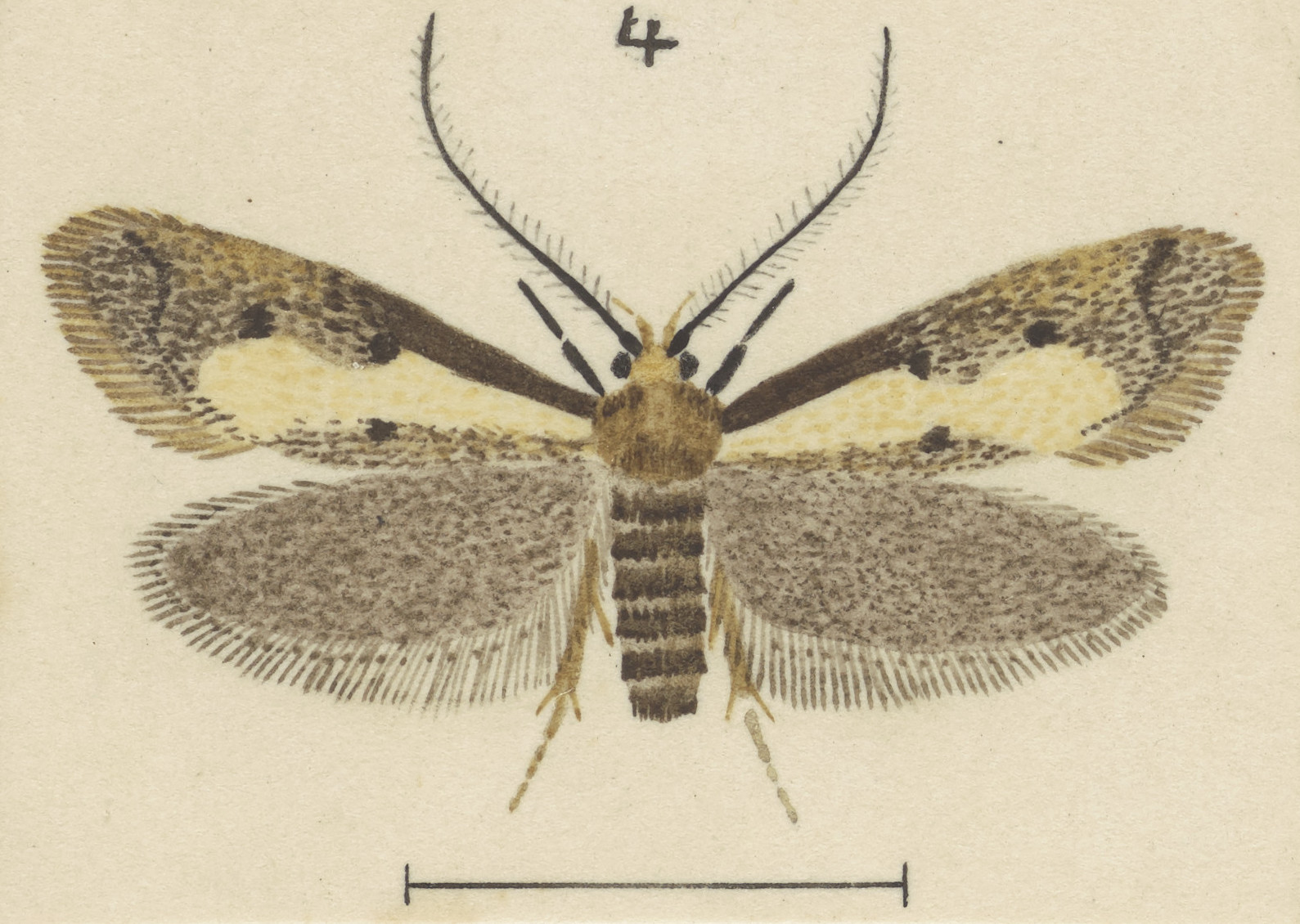
Illustration of T. vestita by George Hudson.

Philpott described this species as follows:

♂. 18 mm. Head pale ochreous. Palpi pale ochreous, fuscous beneath, except at base and apex of second segment. Antennae dark fuscous, ciliations in whorls at joints, 4. Thorax dark ochreous, shoulder bronzy-brown. Abdomen bronzy-fuscous, segmental divisions leaden-white. Legs ochreous, more or less infuscated, anterior pair dark brown above. Forewings elongate, costa strongly arched, apex broadly rounded, termen rounded, very oblique; bronzy-brown, more ochreous apically; a broad ochrcous-white stripe from base to tornus with a black spot resting on its lower edge at ½; a blackish spot above this in the dark costal area; a rather large black discal spot at ⅔: fringes dull-brownish. Hindwings dark fuscous: fringes fuscous with darker basal line.

Hudson described this species as looking "stout".

== Distribution ==
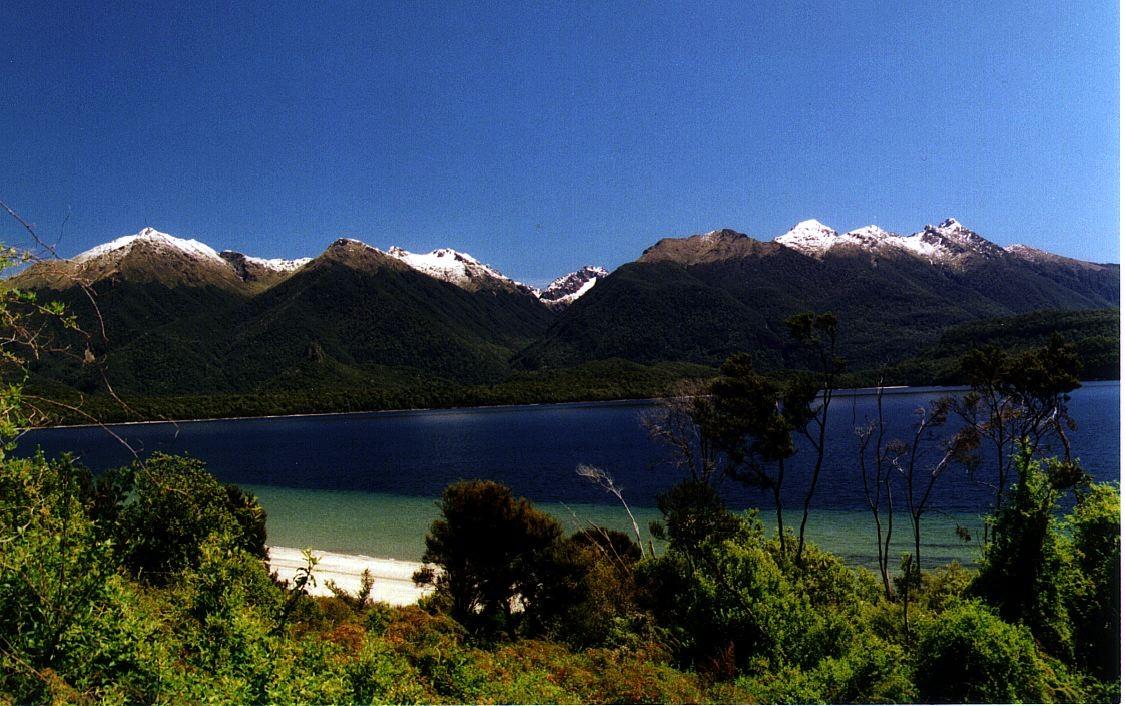
Hunter Mountains, type locality of T. vestita.

This species is endemic to New Zealand and has been found in Fiordland.

== Behaviour ==
The adults of this species is on the wing in January.
