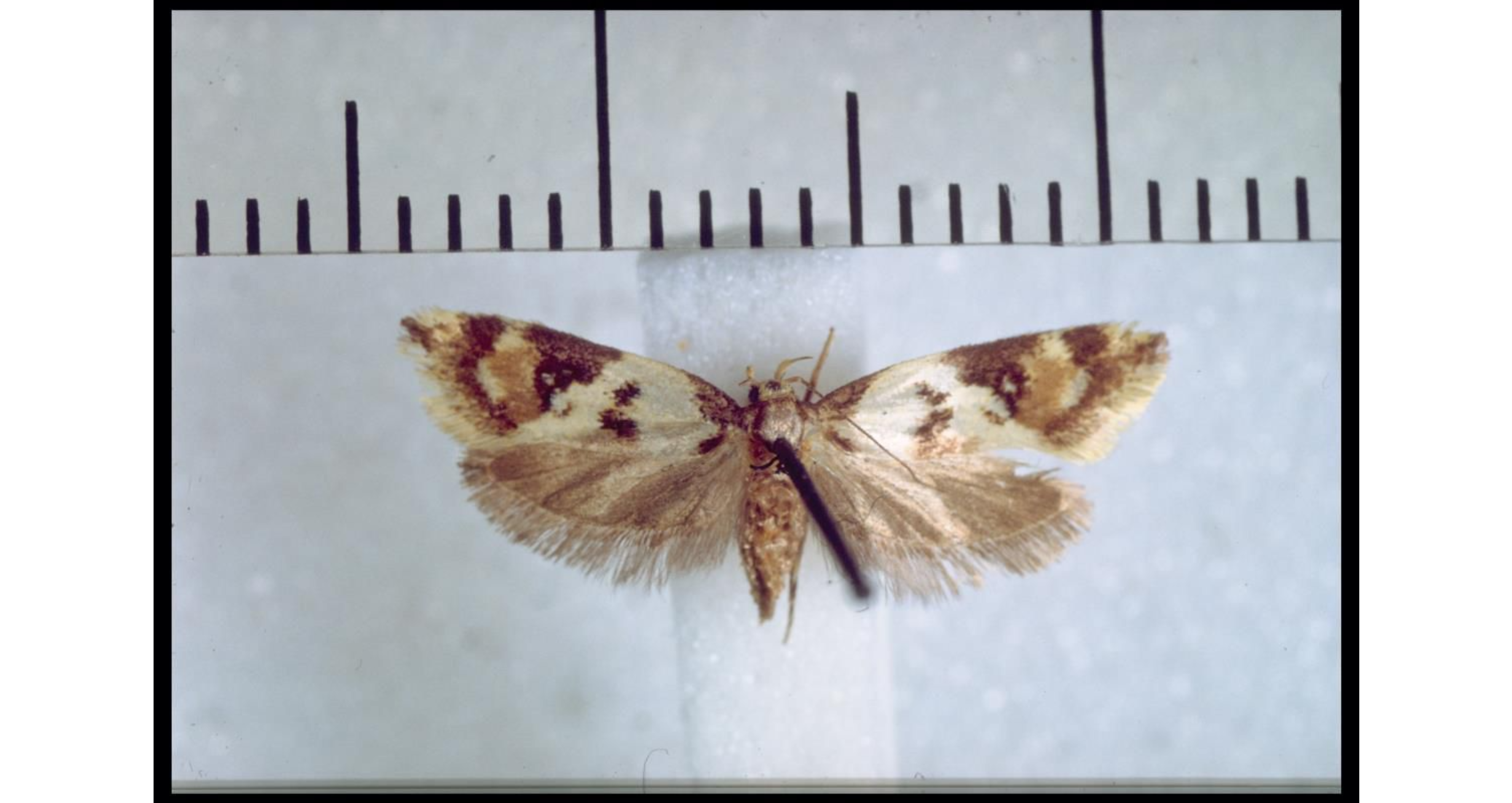

Scientific classification
- Kingdom: Animalia
- Phylum: Arthropoda
- Class: Insecta
- Order: Lepidoptera
- Family: Oecophoridae
- Genus: Trachypepla
- Species: T. semilauta

Binomial name
- Trachypepla semilauta Philpott, 1918

= Trachypepla semilauta =

Species of moth endemic to New Zealand

Trachypepla semilauta is a moth of the family Oecophoridae and was first described by Alfred Philpott in 1918. It is endemic to New Zealand and has been collected in Southland. This species inhabits southern beech forest on the side of mountains. Adults are on the wing in January.

== Taxonomy ==
This species was first described by Alfred Philpott in 1918 using three specimens collected in the Hunter Mountains in January. The male genitalia of this species was studied and illustrated by Alfred Philpott in 1927. George Hudson discussed and illustrated this species in his 1928 book The butterflies and moths of New Zealand. The female holotype is held in the New Zealand Arthropod Collection.

== Description ==
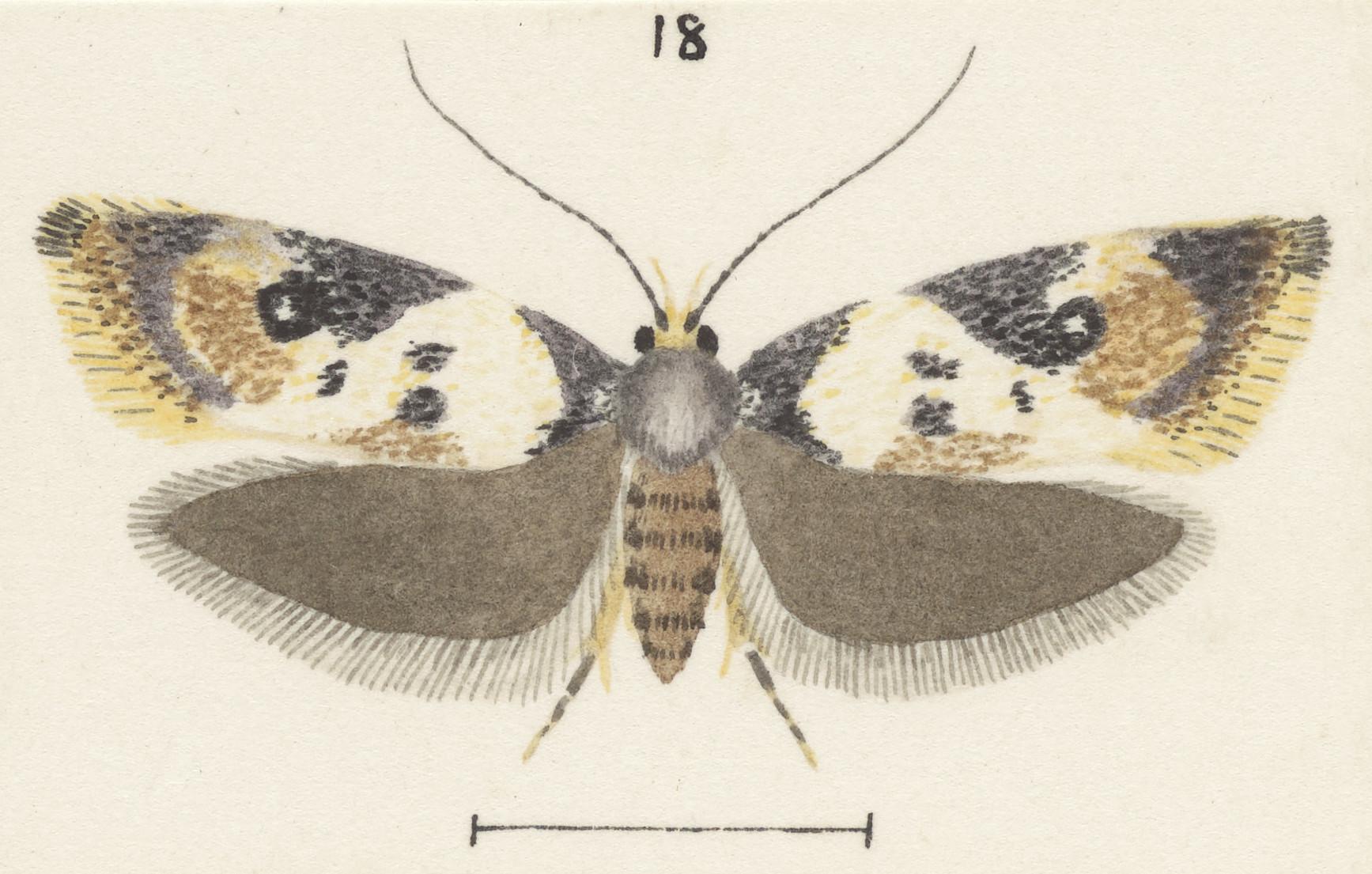
Female illustrated by Hudson.

Philpott described this species as follows:

♂ ♀. 15-16 mm. Head ochreous-white. Palpi ochreous-white infuscated at base beneath and with a fuscous band before apex. Antennae fuscous, obscurely annulated with ochreous, ciliations in ♂ 2 1/2. Thorax fuscous mixed with ochreous. Abdomen fuscous-grey. Legs whitish-grey with some infuscation. Forewings rather broad, costa moderately arched, apex subacute, termen almost straight, strongly oblique; white, faintly tinged with yellowish; base narrowly fuscous-black, extending on costa to 1/5; an outwardly -angulated fuscous-black fascia from dorsum at middle, not reaching costa, broadest on dorsum where it is sometimes bright ochreous; a triangular black fascia from costa at 1/2, its apex, which encloses a white spot, reaching centre of wing, thence continued as a line to tornus; a small black mark preceding this below middle; a curved black fascia from costa at 3/4 round termen to tornus, anteriorly margined with white, the space between this and the median fascia being filled with bright ochreous; a black apical blotch; in some specimens the space between the costal fasciae is suffusedly filled with dark fuscous, the ochreous and white colouring being almost obsolete : cilia whitish-ochreous more or less sprinkled with fuscous; apex fuscous. Hindwings dark greyish-fuscous : cilia grey-fuscous with darker basal line.

This species can be distinguished from its close relative T. ingenua as it has a white patch on the basal portion of its forewings.

== Distribution ==
This species is endemic to New Zealand. Philpott collected specimens at Cleughearn Peak in the Hunter Mountains at an altitude of approximately 825m.

== Habitat ==
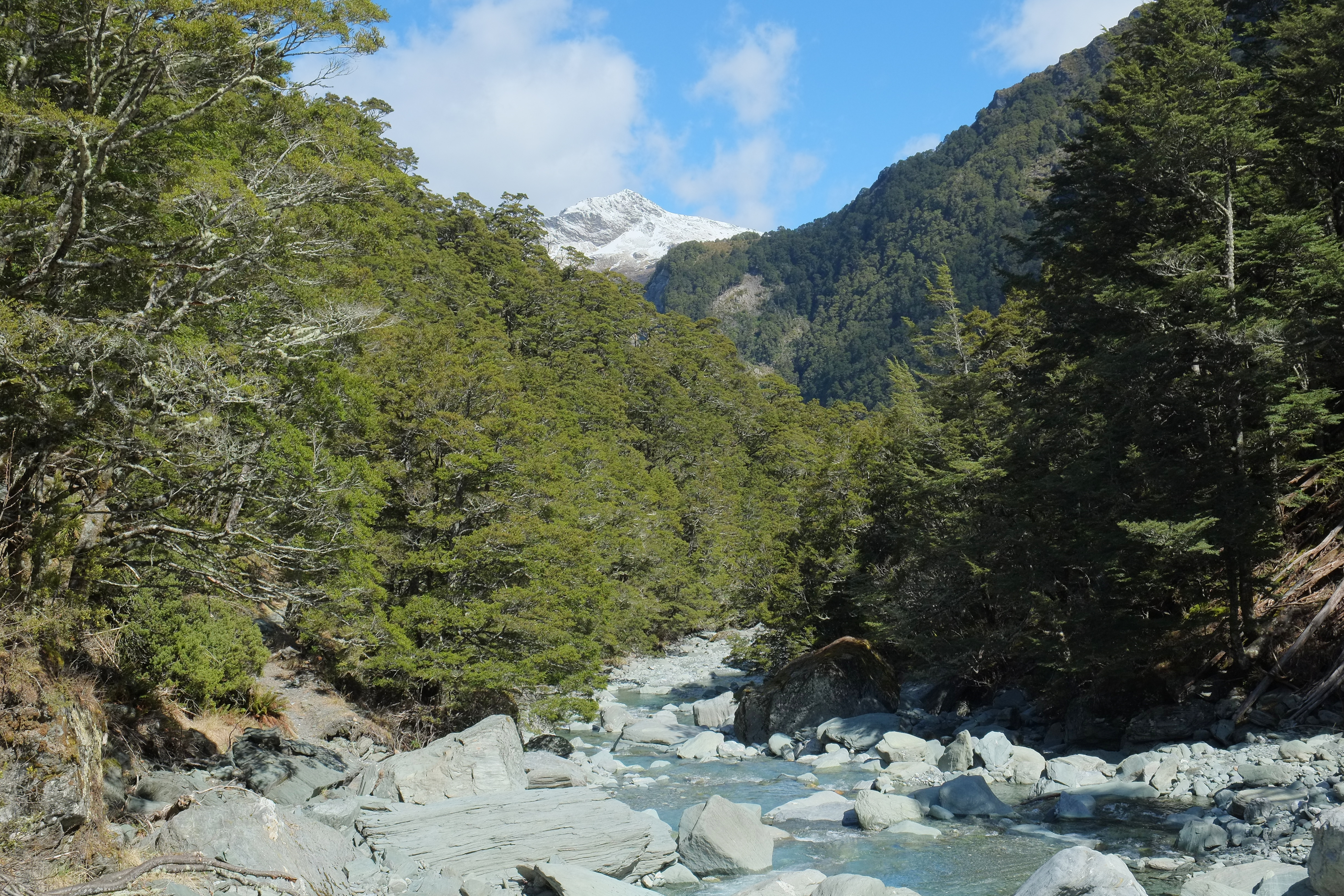
Southern beech forest.

This species inhabits southern beech forests on the side of mountains.

== Behaviour ==
Adults are on the wing in January.
