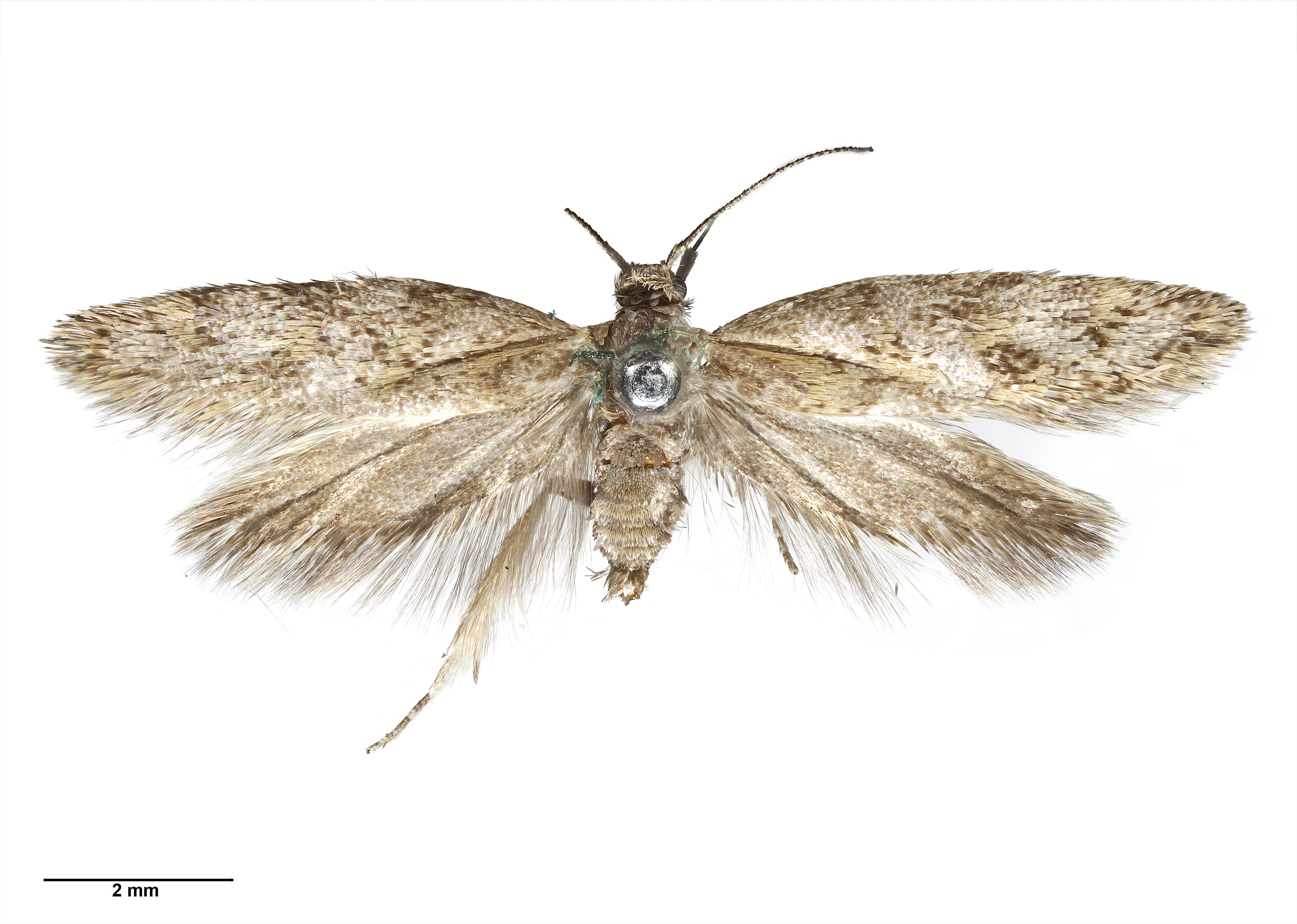
- Male holotype

Scientific classification
- Kingdom: Animalia
- Phylum: Arthropoda
- Class: Insecta
- Order: Lepidoptera
- Family: Oecophoridae
- Genus: Tingena
- Species: T. levicula

Binomial name
- Tingena levicula (Philpott, 1930)

Synonyms
- Borkhausenia levicula Philpott, 1930

= Tingena levicula =

Species of moth, endemic to New Zealand

Tingena levicula is a species of moth in the family Oecophoridae. It is endemic to New Zealand.

== Taxonomy ==
This species was first described by Alfred Philpott using specimens collected by Charles Edwin Clarke at Flat Mountain near Lake Manapouri at an altitude of about 4,000 ft in December. Philpott named Borkhausenia levicula. In 1939 George Hudson discussed and illustrated this species under the name B. levicula. In 1988 J. S. Dugdale placed this species in the genus Tingena. The male holotype specimen, collected at Flat Top Mountain, is held at the Auckland War Memorial Museum.

== Description ==
Philpott described this species as follows:

♂ . 13 mm. Head, palpi and thorax whitish ochreous mixed with brown. Antennae ochreous closely annulated with fuscous, ciliations in ♂3/4. Abdomen grey, brassy tinged. Legs grey mixed with ochreous and brown. Forewings narrow, costa moderately arched, apex round-pointed, termen extremely oblique; greyish white mixed with dark fuscous; markings pale ochreous mixed with dark fuscous; a rather broad fascia from costa at base to dorsum at about 1/3; a similar fascia from costa at 1/4 to dorsum at 2/3; a third fascia from costa at 1/2 to above tornus where it coalesces with an inwardly oblique fascia from costa at 4/5 ; a moderately broad band round termen: fringes greyish white mixed with ochreous and fuscous. Hindwings grey: fringes grey with obscure darker basal line.

== Distribution ==
This species is endemic to New Zealand and has been observed in Fiordland.

== Behaviour ==
The adults of this species are on the wing in December.
