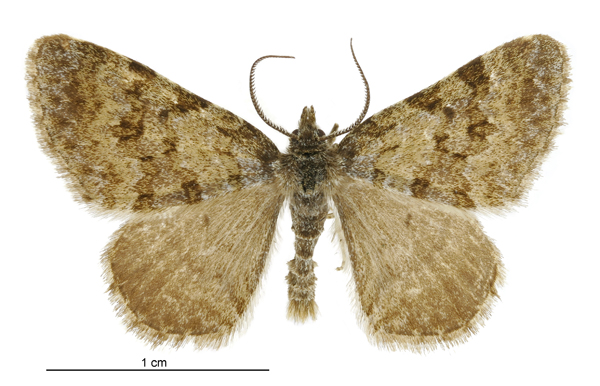
- Male

Scientific classification
- Kingdom: Animalia
- Phylum: Arthropoda
- Clade: Pancrustacea
- Class: Insecta
- Order: Lepidoptera
- Family: Geometridae
- Genus: Asaphodes
- Species: A. omichlias

Binomial name
- Asaphodes omichlias (Meyrick, 1883)

Synonyms
- Pasithea omichlias Meyrick, 1883; Notoreas omichlias (Meyrick, 1883)

= Asaphodes omichlias =

Species of moth, endemic to New Zealand

Asaphodes omichlias is a moth in the family Geometridae. It is endemic to New Zealand and has been observed in both the North and South Islands. This species inhabits rocky, open country in high mountains. Adults are on the wing in January and February. The appearance of the adult of this species is variable with some specimens having a paler and more grey appearance than the more usual brown appearance. Its colouration ensures it blends well with its preferred habitat rocky, open country in the high mountains.

== Taxonomy ==
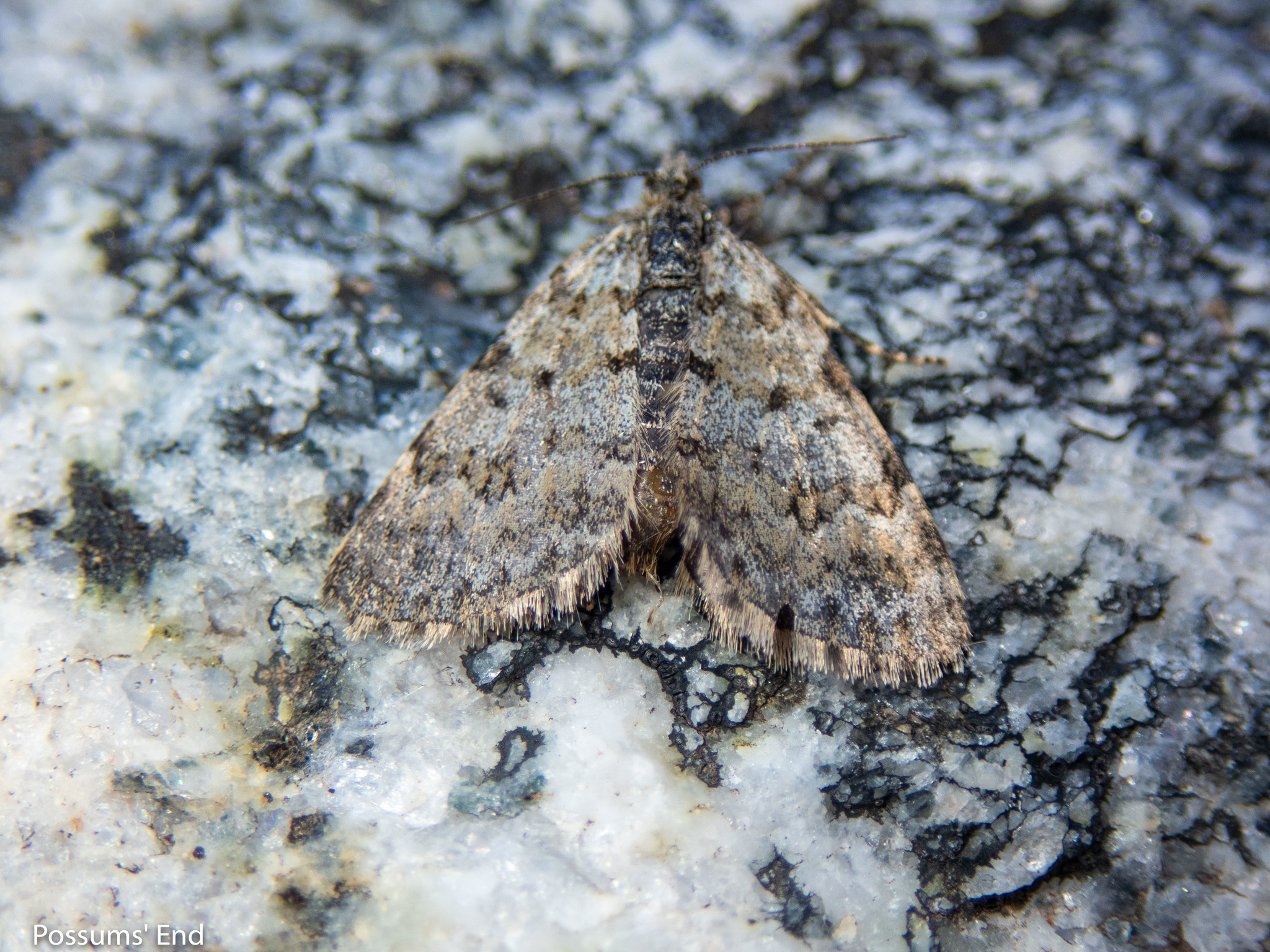
Live observation of A. omichlias.

This species was first described by Edward Meyrick in 1883 using specimens collected at Castle Hill by J. D. Enys and named Pasithea omichlias. Meyrick gave a fuller description of the species later in 1884. George Hudson discussed and illustrated this species in his 1898 volume New Zealand moths and butterflies and referred to it as Notoreas omichlias. He used that same name when he discussed and illustrated the species in 1928. In 1987 Robin C. Craw, after considering the genital structure of this species, proposed assigning this species to the genus Asaphodes. Dugdale agreed with this and placed this species in the genus Asaphodes in 1988. The male lectotype, collected at Castle Hill, Canterbury, is held at the Canterbury Museum.

== Description ==
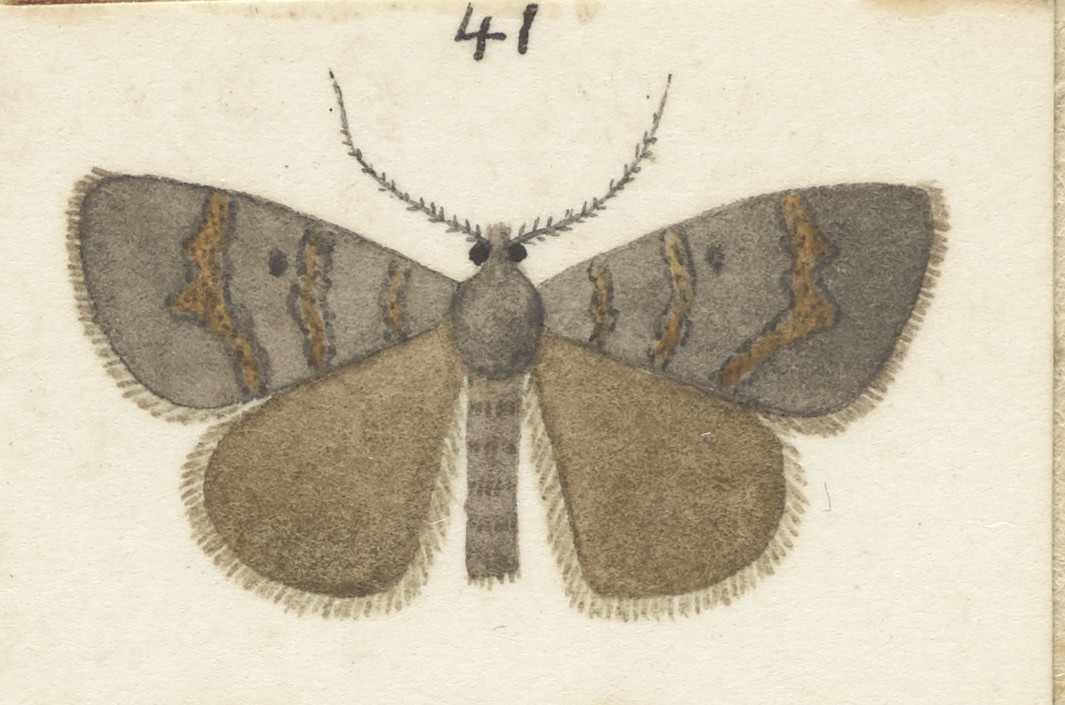
Illustration of male A. omichlias by George Hudson.

Meyrick described this species as:

Male.—25–26 mm. Forewings moderate, hindmargin rounded; dark grey, irrorated with whitish; several obscure dark fuscous lines towards base; a slender curved dark fuscous fascia before middle; a blackish discal dot; a somewhat broader irregular subdentate dark fuscous fascia beyond middle, forming a short bidentate projection in middle, and a shorter simple projection towards costa; sometimes two pale lines beyond this, and a pale subterminal line; a blackish-grey hindmarginal line; cilia pale grey. Hindwings moderate, hindmargin rounded; rather dark grey; three faintly indicated darker median lines alternating with paler; a blackish-grey hindmarginal line; cilia whitish-grey.

This species is variable in appearance with the transverse lines on the forewings as well as the presence of a discal dot on the forewings being liable to change. At some locations specimens can be greyer and paler than the more usual brown appearance.

== Distribution ==
This species is endemic to New Zealand and has been observed in the North and South Islands. The range of this species appears to be from the centre of the North Island southward to the south west of the South Island. It is regarded as being common in the western or main divide mountains in the South Island. It has been observed in the type locality of this species, Castle Hill, the Tararua Range, the Mount Arthur tableland, the mountains around Lake Wakatipu and the Hunter Mountains.

== Habitat ==
This species prefers rocky, open country in high mountains, normally above the tree line.

== Behaviour ==
This species is on the wing in January and February. This species has been observed flying during the day. Adults often settle on grey coloured rocks where its forewing pattern ensures it is well camouflaged. The life history of this species including its larval host species appears not yet to be published.
