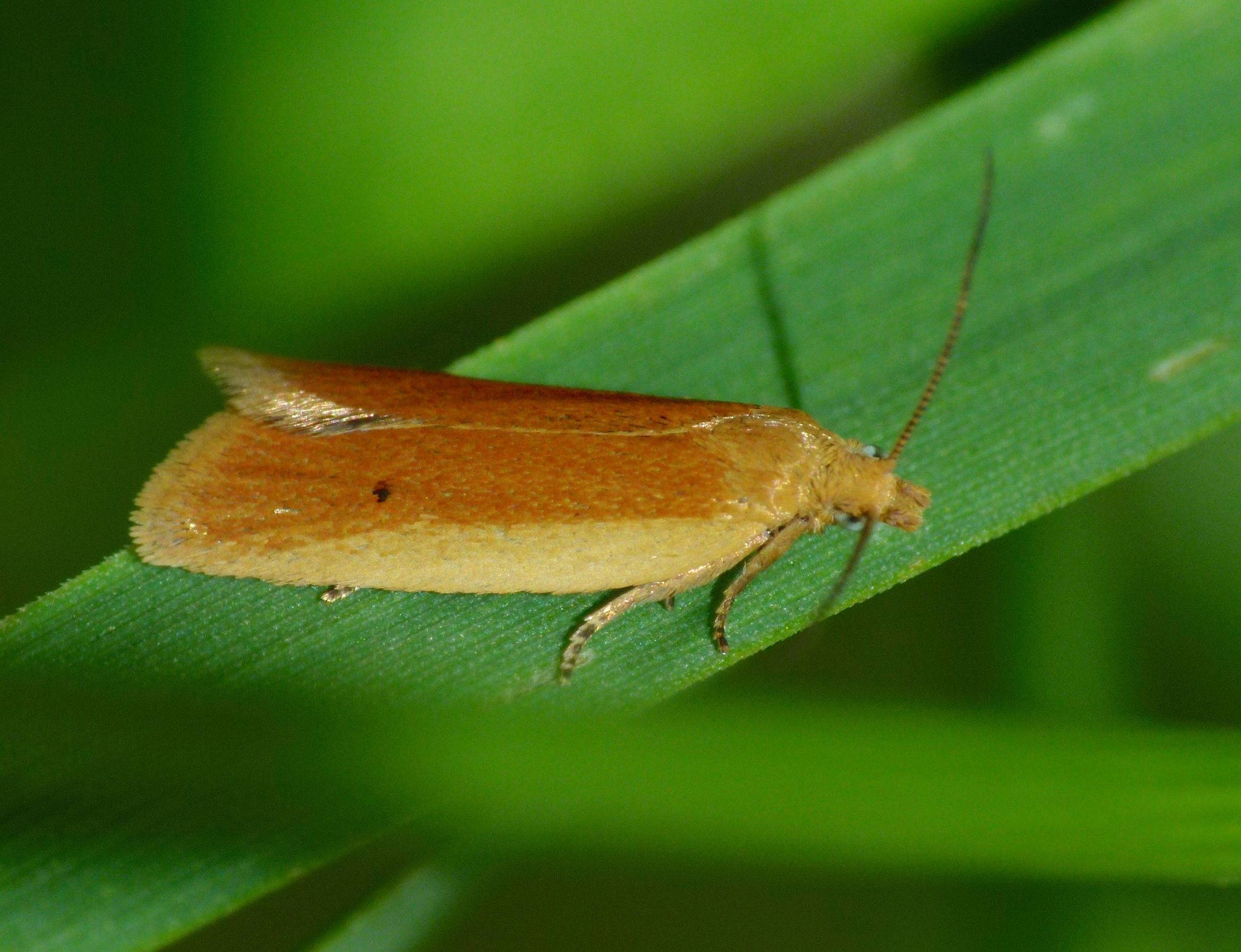

Scientific classification
- Kingdom: Animalia
- Phylum: Arthropoda
- Clade: Pancrustacea
- Class: Insecta
- Order: Lepidoptera
- Family: Tortricidae
- Genus: Epichorista
- Species: E. siriana

Binomial name
- Epichorista siriana (Meyrick, 1881)

Synonyms
- Tortrix siriana Meyrick, 1881; Proselena siriana (Meyrick, 1881)

= Epichorista siriana =

Species of moth endemic to New Zealand

Epichorista siriana is a species of moth of the family Tortricidae. This species was first described by Edward Meyrick in 1881. It is endemic to New Zealand and is found in the North and South Islands. This species inhabits long grass near native forest or in cultivated spaces. Adults are commonly on the wing in December and January and are day flying. They are active in hot sunshine and fly amongst the tops of the grass but are difficult to see.

== Taxonomy ==
This species was first described by Edward Meyrick in 1881 using specimens collected in January in native forest near Hamilton and named Tortrix siriana. In 1883 Meyrick redescribed the species and placed it in the genus Proselena. In 1911 Meyrick placed this species in the genus Epichorista. In 1928 George Hudson discussed and illustrated E. siriana in his book The butterflies and moths of New Zealand. This species is regarded as being taxonomically unresolved as it likely belongs to another genus. It is therefore also known as Epichorista (s.l.) siriana. The male lectotype specimen is held at the Natural History Museum, London.

Both Hudson and John S. Dugdale hypothesised that E. siriana and Eurythecta eremana are possibly forms of the same species.

== Description ==
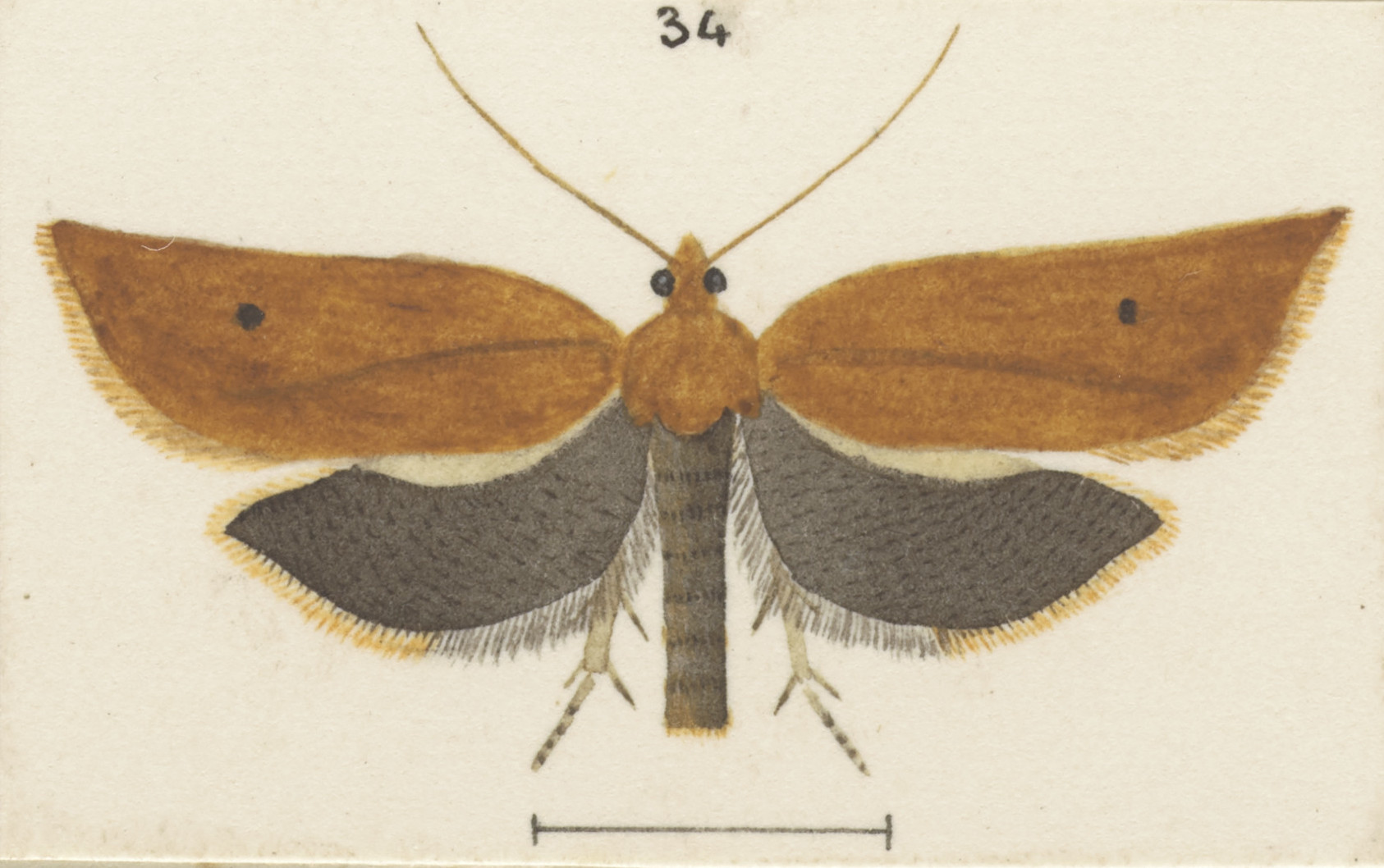
Illustration of male by Hudson.

Meyrick originally described this species as follows:

♂. 4 3/4"-5 1/2". Head, palpi, and thorax deep brownish-ochreous. Antennae ochreous, annulated with dark fuscous. Abdomen blackish-fuscous. Legs pale greyish-ochreous, anterior and middle tibiae and all tarsi suifusedly banded with dark fuscous. Forewings narrow, costa gently arched, hindmargin very obliquely rounded; deep brownish-ochreous, generally mixed with dark fuscous posteriorly, sometimes throughout; usually a distinct blackish dot on disc beyond middle : cilia brownish-ochreous, at anal angle mixed with dark fuscous. Hindwings blackish; cilia blackish, extremities ochreous round apex. ♀. 6 1/2". Head, et ccetera, as in male. Abdomen whitish-ochreous. Forewings rather more elongate, apex more acute, hindmargin very oblique; unicolorous reddish-ochreous; cilia ochreous, reddish-tinged towards apex, extremities whitish towards anal angle. Hindwings whitish, apex faintly greyish; cilia whitish.

Meyrick stated in that original description that this species is distinctive and is characterised by its small size and uniform deep brownish-ochreous or reddish-ochreous forewings. The hindwings are blackish in the male and whiteish in the female. However when discussing the species Merophyas leucaniana, then known as Tortrix leucaniana, Meyrick stated that the specimen originally described as the female of E. siriana is a variety of M. leucaniana, and that the true female of E. siriana resembles the male.

Hudson described the species as follows:

The expansion of the wings is 1/2 inch. The fore-wings are rather narrow with the apex acute and the termen very rounded and oblique; dark ochreous, slightly speckled with blackish-grey; there is a blackish discal dot; the cilia are brownish-ochreous, paler towards the tornus. The hind-wings are blackish-grey, darker towards the termen.

== Distribution ==
This species is endemic to New Zealand. It has been observed in the North Island, including around Hamilton, the Manawatū-Whanganui region and in Wellington, and in the South Island.

== Habitat ==
This species inhabits long grass either on the edges of native forest or in cultivated spaces.

== Behaviour ==
Adults of this is commonly on the wing in December and January. It is a day flying moth and are active in hot sunshine amongst long grass. Meyrick stated they fly amongst the tops of the grass but are difficult to see.
