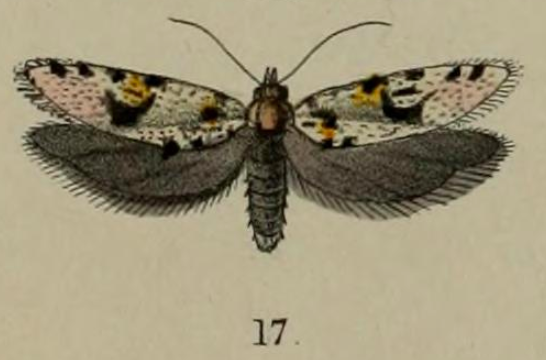
- Eurythecta robusta

Scientific classification
- Kingdom: Animalia
- Phylum: Arthropoda
- Class: Insecta
- Order: Lepidoptera
- Family: Tortricidae
- Tribe: Archipini
- Genus: Eurythecta; Meyrick, 1883

Synonyms
- Eurytheca Razowski, 1977

= Eurythecta =

Genus of tortrix moths

Eurythecta is a genus of moths belonging to the subfamily Tortricinae of the family Tortricidae.

== Species ==
- Eurythecta curva Philpott, 1918
- Eurythecta eremana (Meyrick, 1885)
- Eurythecta leucothrinca Meyrick, 1931
- Eurythecta loxias (Meyrick, 1888)
- Eurythecta phaeoxyla Meyrick, 1938
- Eurythecta robusta (Butler, 1877)
- Eurythecta zelaea Meyrick, 1905

== See also ==
- List of Tortricidae genera
