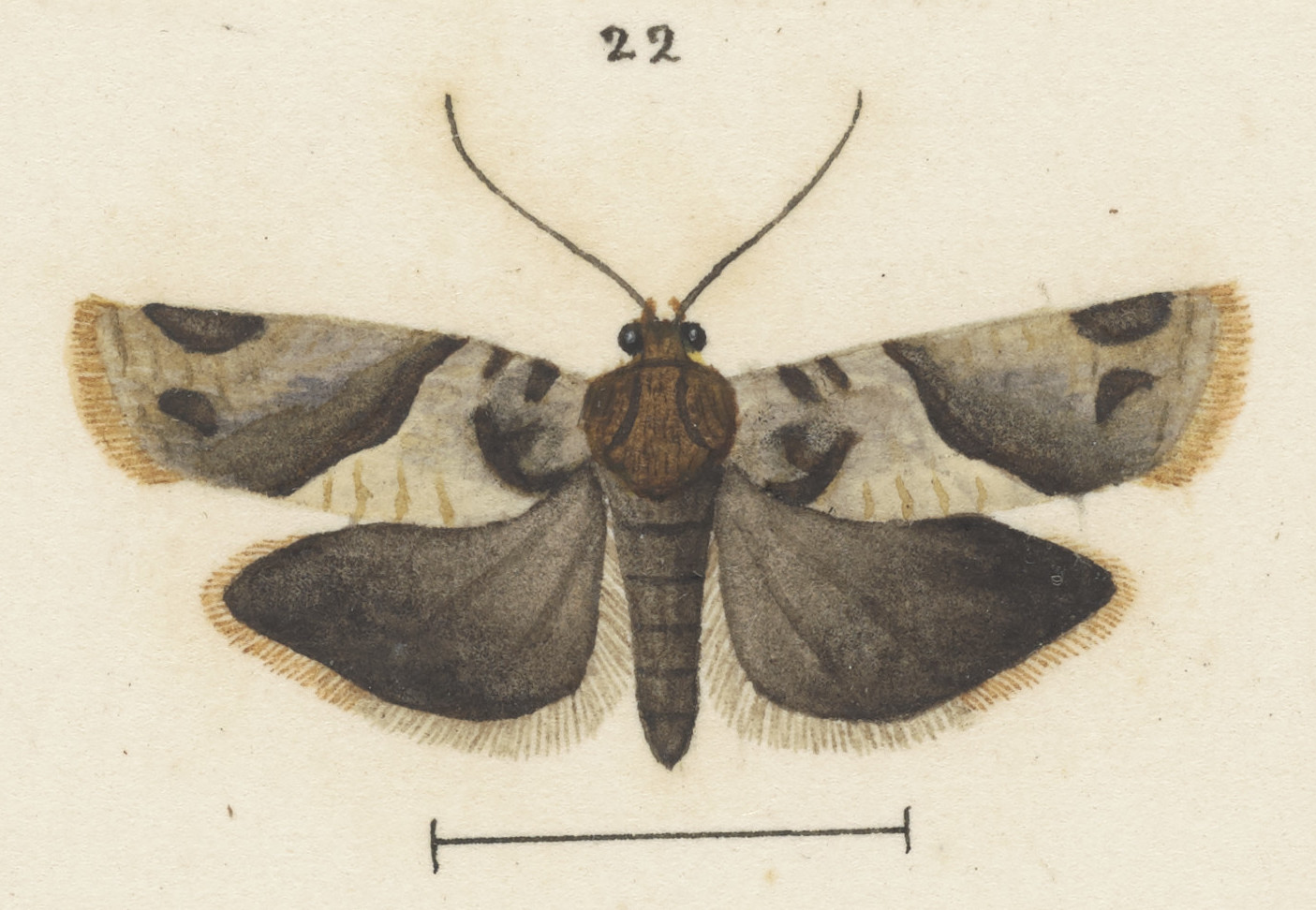
- female

Scientific classification
- Kingdom: Animalia
- Phylum: Arthropoda
- Class: Insecta
- Order: Lepidoptera
- Family: Tortricidae
- Genus: Eurythecta
- Species: E. loxias

Binomial name
- Eurythecta loxias (Meyrick, 1888)

Synonyms
- Proselena loxias Meyrick, 1888

= Eurythecta loxias =

Species of moth

Eurythecta loxias is a species of moth of the family Tortricidae. It is found in New Zealand.

The wingspan is 13–14 mm. The forewings are whitish ochreous, marbled with pale ferruginous. The hindwings are dark fuscous grey, but somewhat lighter towards base.
