= Green Lake (Southland) =

Lake in Hunter Mountains in the Southland Region of New Zealand

- Location within New Zealand
- Interactive map of Green Lake
- Coordinates: 45°47′45″S 167°23′45″E
- Basin countries: New Zealand
- Surface area: 4.7 square kilometres (1.8 sq mi)
- Surface elevation: 822 metres (2,697 ft)

Green Lake is a lake in Hunter Mountains in the Southland Region of New Zealand located to the north of Lake Monowai. The lake has no surface outlets but probably feeds several streams draining to lake Monowai via springs. The lake is a basin in the debris of the Green Lake Landslide, which is the largest known above-sea-level landslide on earth. Steep escarpments on the north and east sides of the lake form the head scarp of the landslide, which has an estimated volume of 27 cubic kilometres (6.5 mi^{3}).

The New Zealand Department of Conservation maintains a tramping hut on the northern shore, part of the Borland Road / Lake Monowai circuit.
