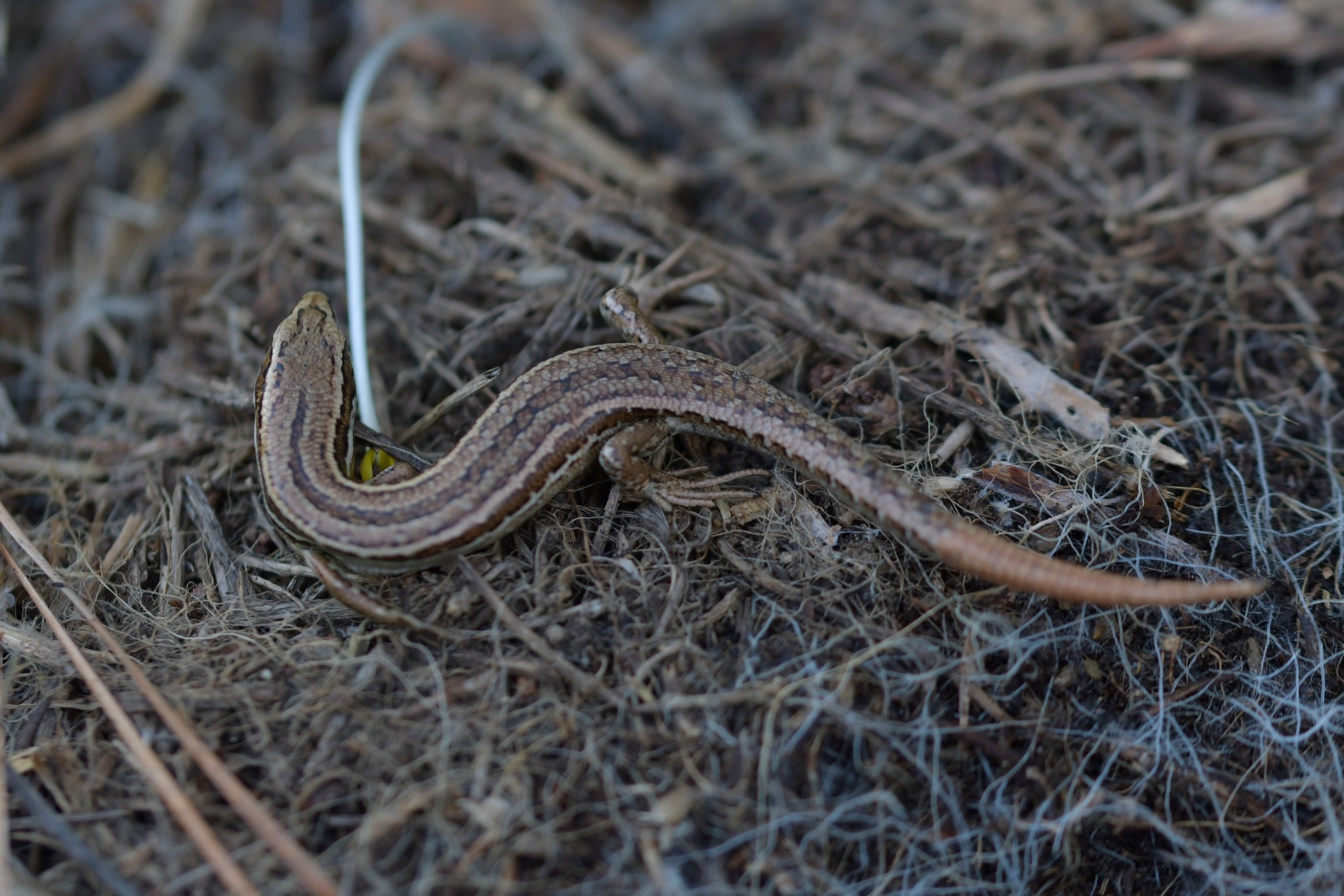

Scientific classification
- Kingdom: Animalia
- Phylum: Chordata
- Class: Reptilia
- Order: Squamata
- Family: Scincidae
- Genus: Oligosoma
- Species: O. polychroma

Binomial name
- Oligosoma polychroma (Patterson & Daugherty, 1990)
- Distribution of Oligosoma polychroma in New Zealand Known native range

Synonyms
- Leiolopisma nigriplanatre polychroma (Patterson & Dougherty ,1990); Oligosoma nigriplantare polychroma (Patterson & Dougherty ,1995)

= Oligosoma polychroma =

Common or northern grass skink

Species of lizard

The common skink (Oligosoma polychroma), also known as the northern grass skink, is a species of skink native to New Zealand. Although historically classified as a subspecies of Oligosoma nigriplantare, it is likely to be given separate species status as data suggests it is a distinct species.

== Distribution ==
The common skink is widespread in New Zealand from Stewart Island to the middle of North Island.

== Conservation status ==
In 2012 the Department of Conservation classified the common skink as Not Threatened under the New Zealand Threat Classification System.
