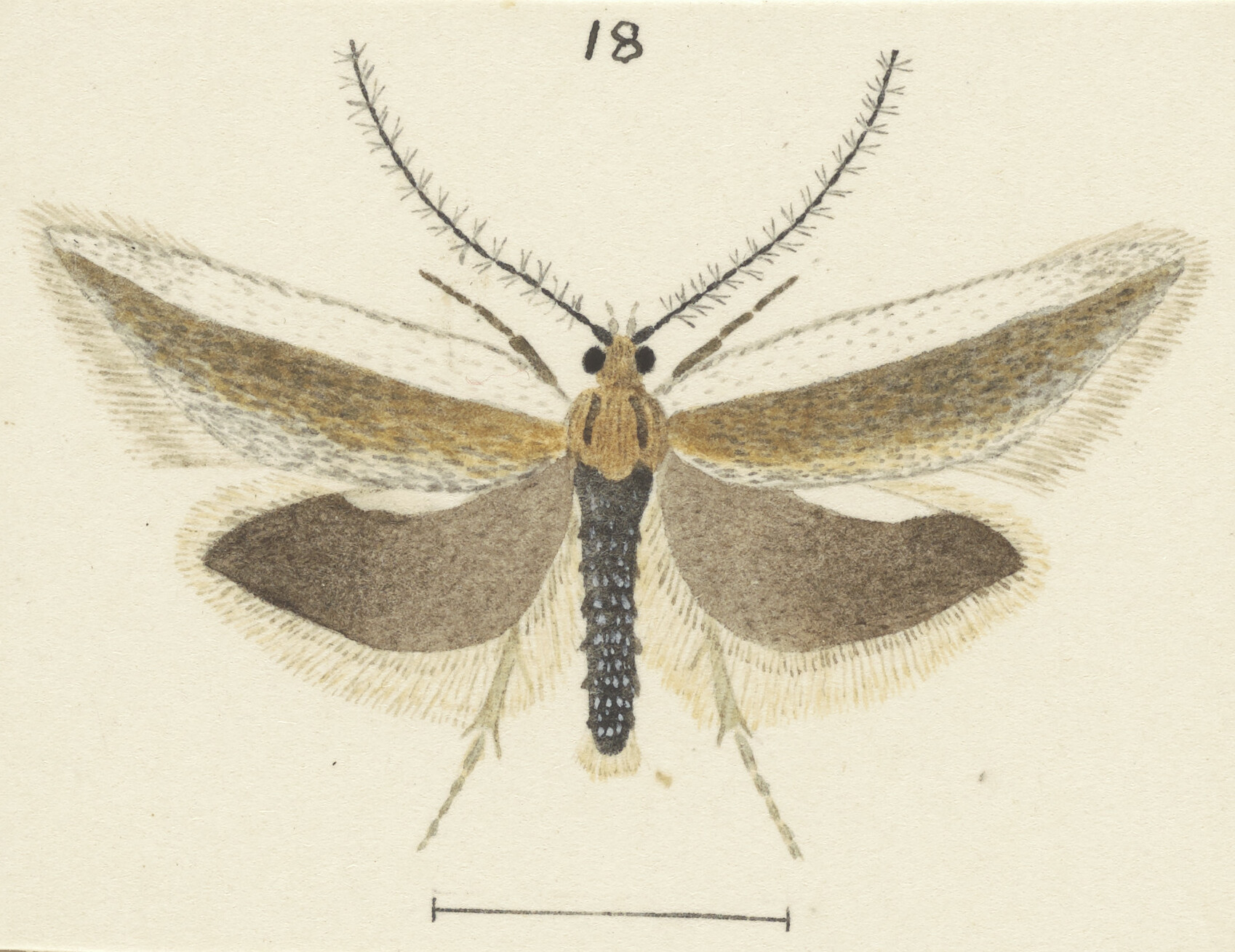

Scientific classification
- Domain: Eukaryota
- Kingdom: Animalia
- Phylum: Arthropoda
- Class: Insecta
- Order: Lepidoptera
- Family: Tortricidae
- Genus: Eurythecta
- Species: E. leucothrinca

Binomial name
- Eurythecta leucothrinca Meyrick, 1931

= Eurythecta leucothrinca =

Species of moth

Eurythecta leucothrinca is a species of moth of the family Tortricidae. It is found in New Zealand. The habitat consists of montane to sub-alpine grasslands and coastal salt marshes.

Adult females are brachypterous. Adults have been recorded on wing from April to late June.

The larvae probably feed on leaf-litter.
