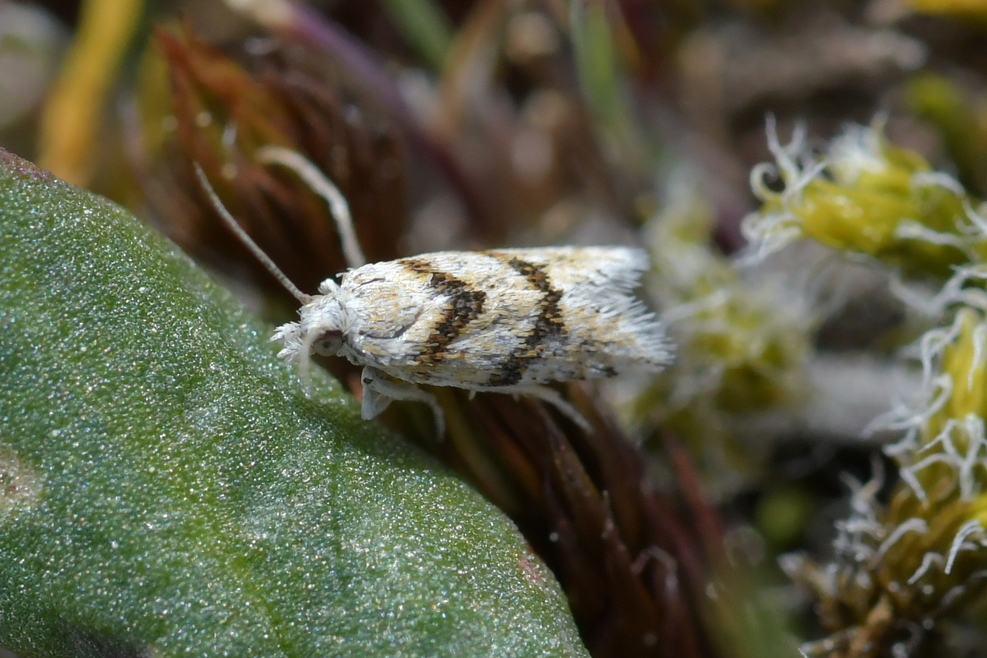

Scientific classification
- Kingdom: Animalia
- Phylum: Arthropoda
- Class: Insecta
- Order: Lepidoptera
- Family: Tortricidae
- Genus: Eurythecta
- Species: E. robusta

Binomial name
- Eurythecta robusta (Butler, 1877)

Synonyms
- Zelotherses robusta Butler, 1877; Steganoptycha negligens Butler, 1877

= Eurythecta robusta =

Species of moth

Eurythecta robusta is a species of moth in the family Tortricidae. This species is endemic to New Zealand. It is classified as "At Risk, Naturally Uncommon" by the Department of Conservation.

== Taxonomy ==
This species was first described by Arthur Gardiner Butler in 1877 and named Zelotherses robusta. Butler used specimens from James Hector that were collected on the Canterbury Plains. Later in the same publication, thinking he was describing a separate species, Butler also named this moth Steganoptycha negligens. In 1883 Edward Meyrick placed the species within the genus Eurythecta and synonymised both names given to the species by Butler. George Hudson discussed and illustrated this species in his 1928 publication The Moths and Butterflies of New Zealand. The lectotype specimen is held at the Natural History Museum, London.

== Description ==
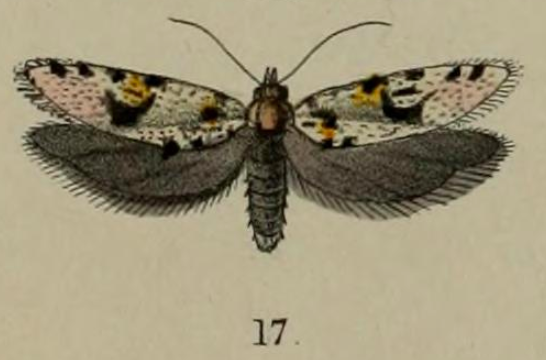
1827 illustration by Edgar Albert Smith

Butler described the species as follows:

♂︎♀︎. Primaries sordid white, acute; a broad oblique patch beginning just within the base of the discoidal cell and terminating in a point near to the centre of inner margin, a slender subcostal dash near the base, five spots on the apical half of costa, a squamose patch across the median veins, and the terminations of the nervures black-brown; secondaries greyish, particularly towards the outer margin; body sordid white : primaries below grey, the costal margin white, crossed by greyish spots towards apex; secondaries paler grey, the costa white; body below white. Expanse of wings 4 1/2 lines.

Meyrick noted that the species is extremely variable in colour.

== Distribution ==
E. robusta is endemic to New Zealand. The species has been found in North, Mid and South Canterbury. The type locality of this species is likely Yaldhurst/West Melton in Christchurch and this area is now largely modified by the development of lifestyle blocks. The species has occurred at Kaitorete Spit, Gore Bay, Porters Pass, McLeans Island, and has surviving populations at Ashburton, and at the mouths of the Rangitata and Hinds rivers. Hudson stated that the species had been collected at Alexandra and Ben Lomond but there is some doubt as to whether this is the case.

== Biology and behaviour ==
The females of E. robust are flightless. Adult males are on the wing from September until January.

== Host plants and habitat ==
The larvae feed on low mat-forming herbs and turf plants. The favoured habitat of the species consists of open stony grounds or coastal grassland habitat.

== Conservation status ==
This species has been classified as having the "At Risk, Naturally Uncommon" conservation status under the New Zealand Threat Classification System. The main threat to this species is the destruction of its original habitat both by urban development and by farming practises.
