= Mount Moturau =

Mountain in New Zealand

Mt Moturau
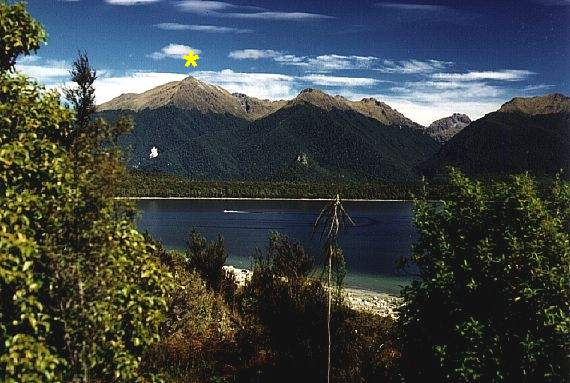
- Mount Moturau, Lake Manapouri

Highest point
- Elevation: 1,497 m (4,911 ft)
- Prominence: 215 m (705 ft)
- Coordinates: 45°35′0.4″S 167°28′26″E

Geography
- Location: South Island, New Zealand
- Topo map: 260-C44

Climbing
- First ascent: J Calder
- Easiest route: Bicycle Spur Trail

Mount Moturau is a mountain at height 1,497 m, rising southwest of the Hope Arm of Lake Manapouri and clearly visible from Manapouri township. Note: Topographic map C44, Hunter Mountains, GR 2080950E 5497500N. Not named on official mapping pre-10 May 2001.

== History ==
The name Moturau was originally the Maori name for the summer village of what is now known as Manapouri. It is also the name of a tourist vessel on Lake Manapouri as well as a hut on the Kepler Track and was said to be an older name for Lake Manapouri itself.
