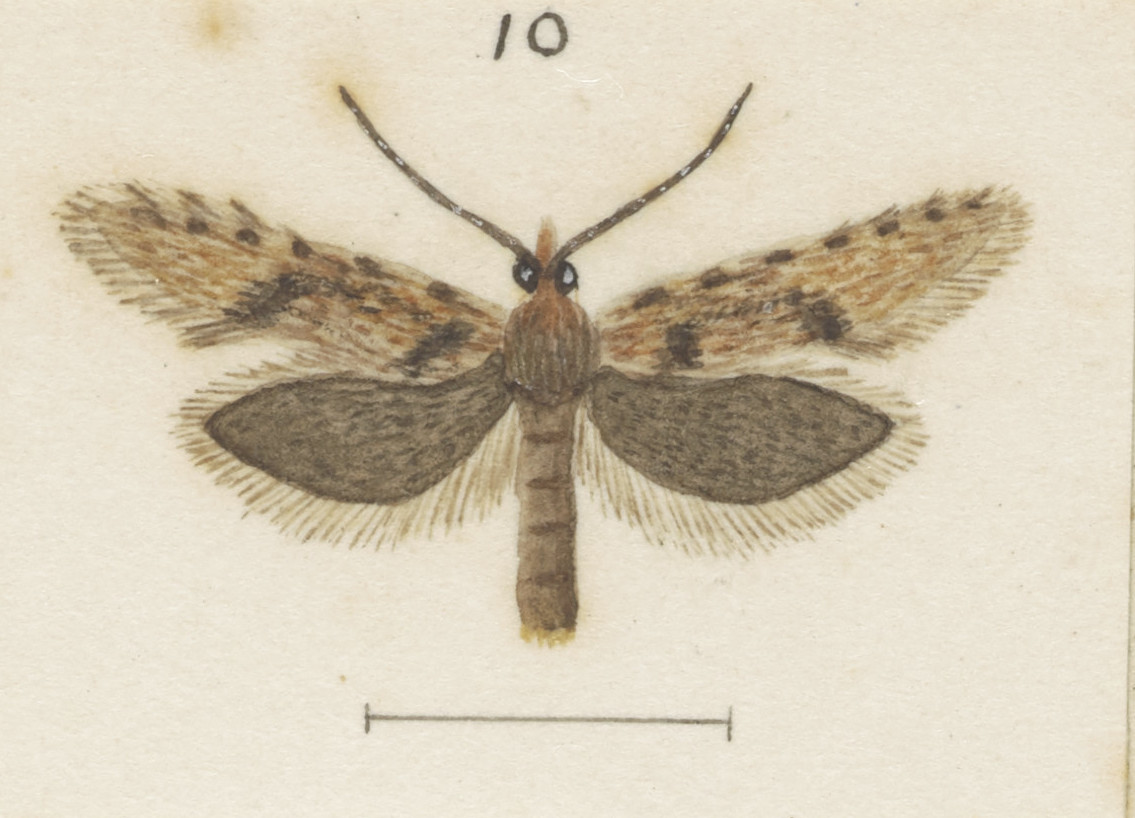
- Illustration of male

Scientific classification
- Kingdom: Animalia
- Phylum: Arthropoda
- Class: Insecta
- Order: Lepidoptera
- Family: Tortricidae
- Genus: Eurythecta
- Species: E. zelaea

Binomial name
- Eurythecta zelaea Meyrick, 1905

= Eurythecta zelaea =

Species of moth

Eurythecta zelaea is a species of moth of the family Tortricidae. It is found in New Zealand. It is endemic to dry herbfields in Otago and Canterbury.

Adult females are brachypterous.

The larvae feed on a wide range of plants, including Plantago lanceolata, Cirsium vulgare, Anagallis arvensis and Rumex acetosella. They roll the leaves of their host plants.
