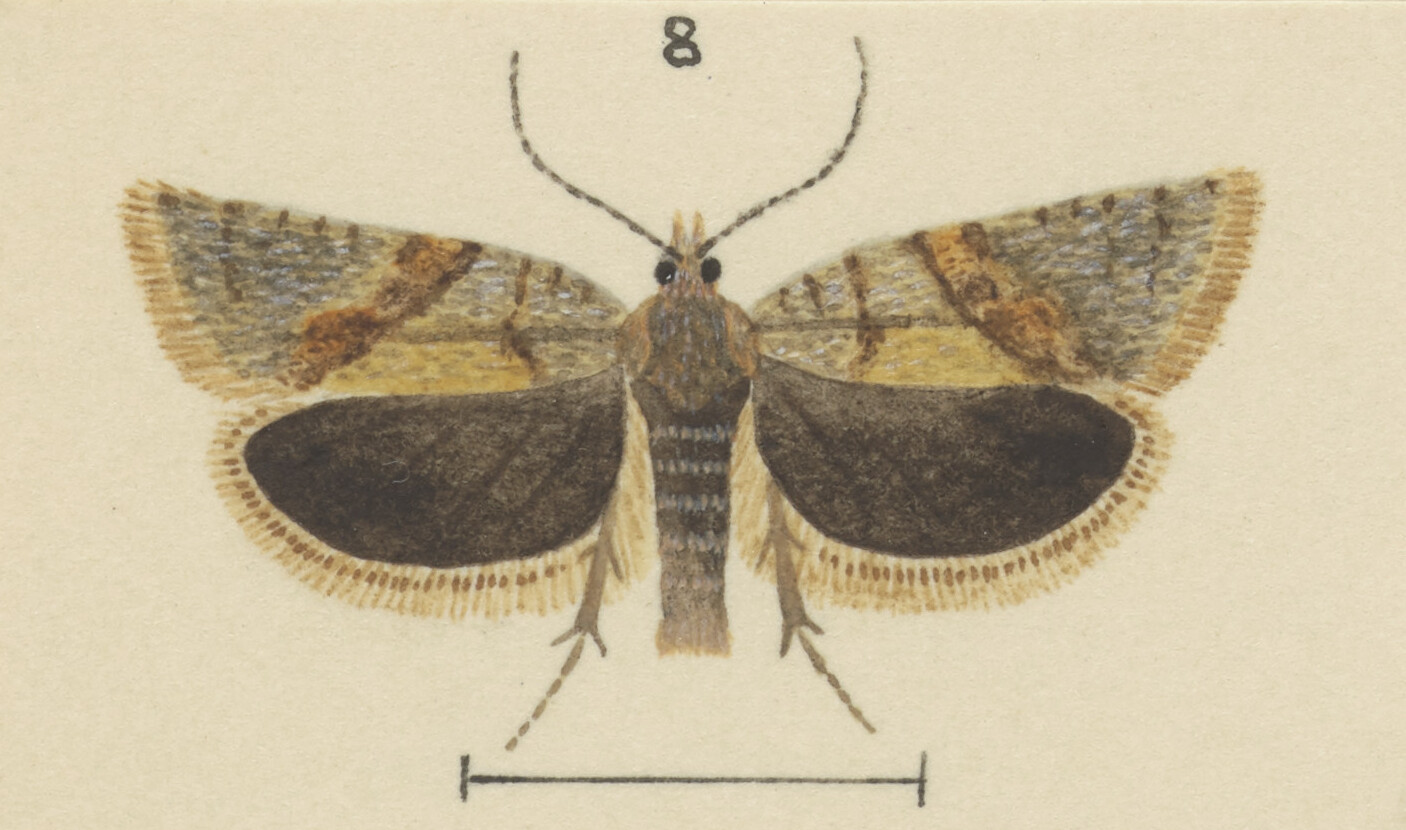
- Illustration of male

Scientific classification
- Domain: Eukaryota
- Kingdom: Animalia
- Phylum: Arthropoda
- Class: Insecta
- Order: Lepidoptera
- Family: Tortricidae
- Genus: Eurythecta
- Species: E. phaeoxyla

Binomial name
- Eurythecta phaeoxyla Meyrick, 1938

= Eurythecta phaeoxyla =

Species of moth

Eurythecta phaeoxyla is a species of moth of the family Tortricidae. It was described by Edward Meyrick in 1938. It is endemic to New Zealand and has been observed in the Canterbury and Otago regions. The preferred habitat of this species is alpine swampy areas. The larvae feed on herbs and adults are on the wing in February.

== Taxonomy ==
This species was first described by Edward Meyrick in 1938 using specimens collected by Stewart Lindsay at Mount Torlesse, Canterbury above Porter's Pass in February. George Hudson discussed and illustrated this species in his 1939 book A supplement to the butterflies and moths of New Zealand. The placement of this species in the genus Eurythecta is in doubt and as such this species is also known as Eurythecta (s.l.) phaeoxyla. The male holotype specimen is held at the Canterbury Museum.

== Description ==
Meyrick described this species as follows:

♂ ♀. 15 mm. Head, palpi, thorax ochreous, partly infuscated or mixed whitish. Forewings suboblong, hardly dilated, costa moderately arched towards base, then straight, termen almost straight, little oblique; ochreous-grey or grey; markings dark ochreous-brown, or dark fuscous marginally suffused ochreous; basal patch obscure, indicated mainly by a spot on costa at 1/5 and one in disc beyond it; central fascia moderate, oblique, straight-edged; some slight obscure mottling posteriorly; cilia light ochreous or greyish-ochreous. Hind-wings dark grey; cilia light greyish-ochreous, a grey subbasal line.

== Distribution ==
It is endemic to New Zealand. This species has been observed in the Canterbury and Otago regions.

== Habitat and hosts ==
The preferred habitat of this species consists of alpine swampy areas. The larvae of E. phaeoxyla feed on herbs.

== Behaviour ==
Adults of this species have been observed on the wing in February.
