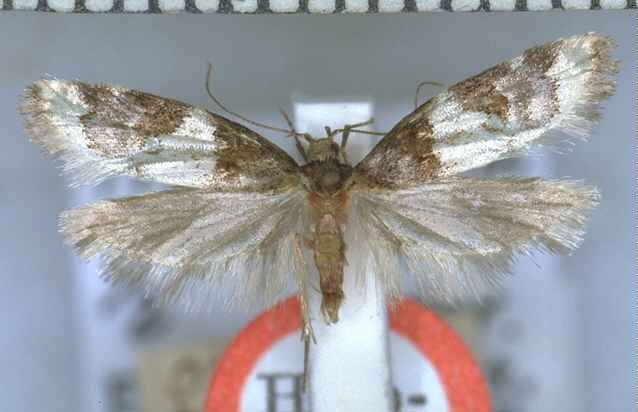
- Male holotype

Scientific classification
- Kingdom: Animalia
- Phylum: Arthropoda
- Class: Insecta
- Order: Lepidoptera
- Family: Oecophoridae
- Genus: Trachypepla
- Species: T. ingenua

Binomial name
- Trachypepla ingenua Meyrick, 1911

= Trachypepla ingenua =

Species of moth endemic to New Zealand

Trachypepla ingenua is a moth of the family Oecophoridae first described by Edward Meyrick in 1911. It is endemic to New Zealand and has been collected in both the North and South Islands. This species is one of the larger in the genus Trachypepla and the colouration of the adults imitates bird droppings. The preferred habitat of T. ingenua is native forest and adults are on the wing from December to February.

== Taxonomy ==
This species was first described by Edward Meyrick in 1911 using a specimen collected by George Hudson at Ōtira River in December. The male genitalia of this species was studied and illustrated by Alfred Philpott in 1927. In 1928 Hudson discussed and illustrated this species in his 1928 book The butterflies and moths of New Zealand. The male holotype is held at the Natural History Museum, London.

== Description ==
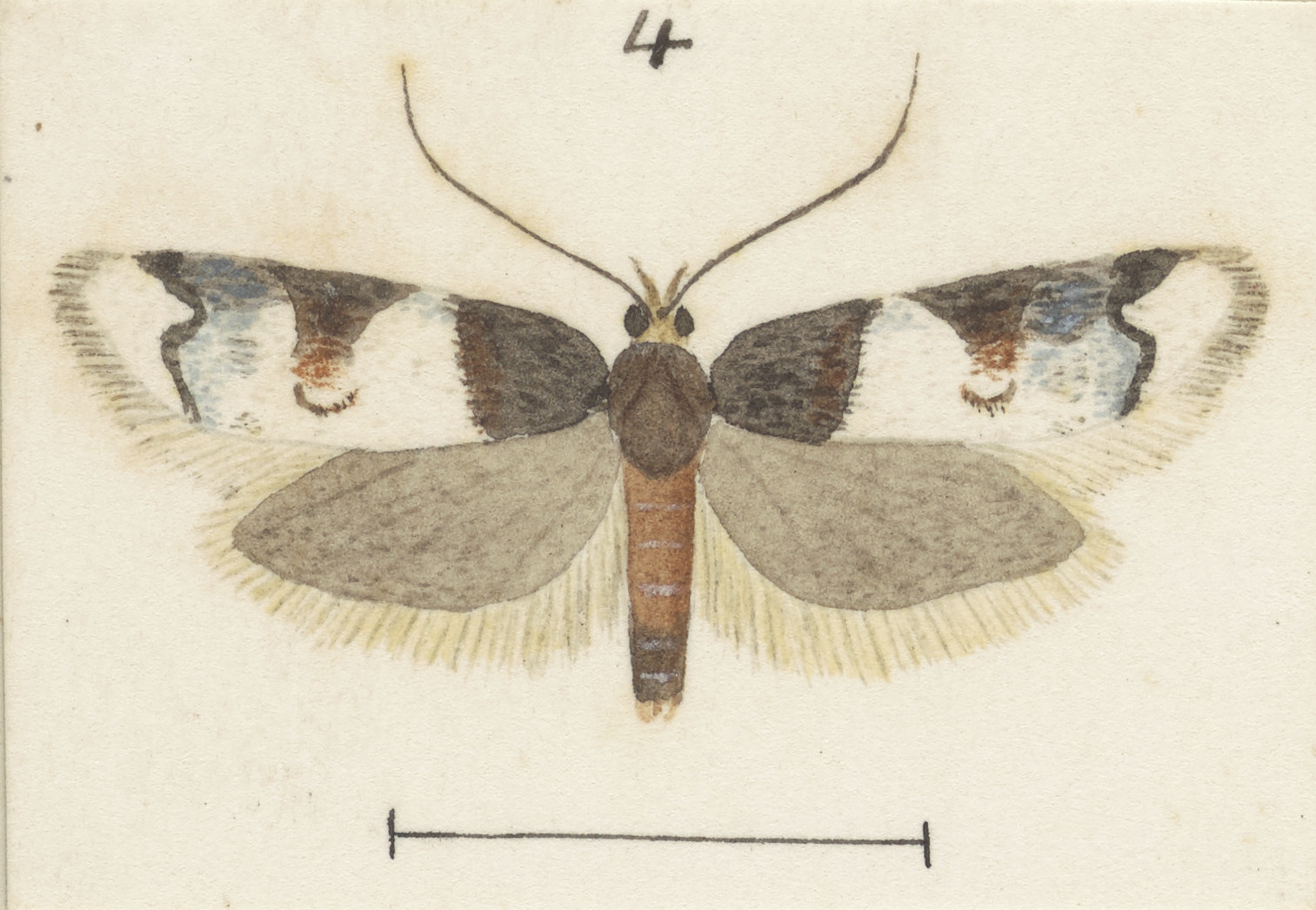
Illustration of T. ingenua.

Meyrick described this species as follows:

♂. 18 mm. Head rather dark fuscous irrorated with whitish. Palpi dark fuscous, second joint sprinkled with white towards apex, terminal joint white with two bands of dark-fuscous irroration. Antennal ciliations 1 1/2. Thorax dark fuscous. Abdomen brownish finely irrorated with whitish, segmental margins whitish-grey. Forewings elongate, rather narrow, costa moderately arched, apex obtuse, termen very obliquely rounded; white; a dark purplish-fuscous basal patch occupying 2/5 of wing, outer edge straight, mixed with chestnut-brown towards edge from above middle to near dorsum; some scattered grey scales in disc beyond this; an irregular-triangular dark purplish-fuscous blotch on costa beyond middle, reaching more than half across wing, posterior edge excavated beneath costa, its lower portion mixed with chestnut-brown; a ring of dark-fuscous irroration preceding apex of this blotch in disc, and partly limited by it : a narrow transverse suffused grey patch in disc following this; a curved cloudy line of dark- fuscous irroration from 4/5 of costa to tornus, forming a triangular dark-fuscous spot on costa, and indented beneath this : cilia whitish, round apex tinged with grey and somewhat sprinkled with dark fuscous. Hind-wings light grey; cilia whitish.

This species is one of the larger moths in the Trachypepla genus and its colouring imitates the droppings of birds. This species can be distinguished from its close relative T. semilauta as it lacks the white patch on the basal portion of the forewings that is present in the latter species.

== Distribution ==
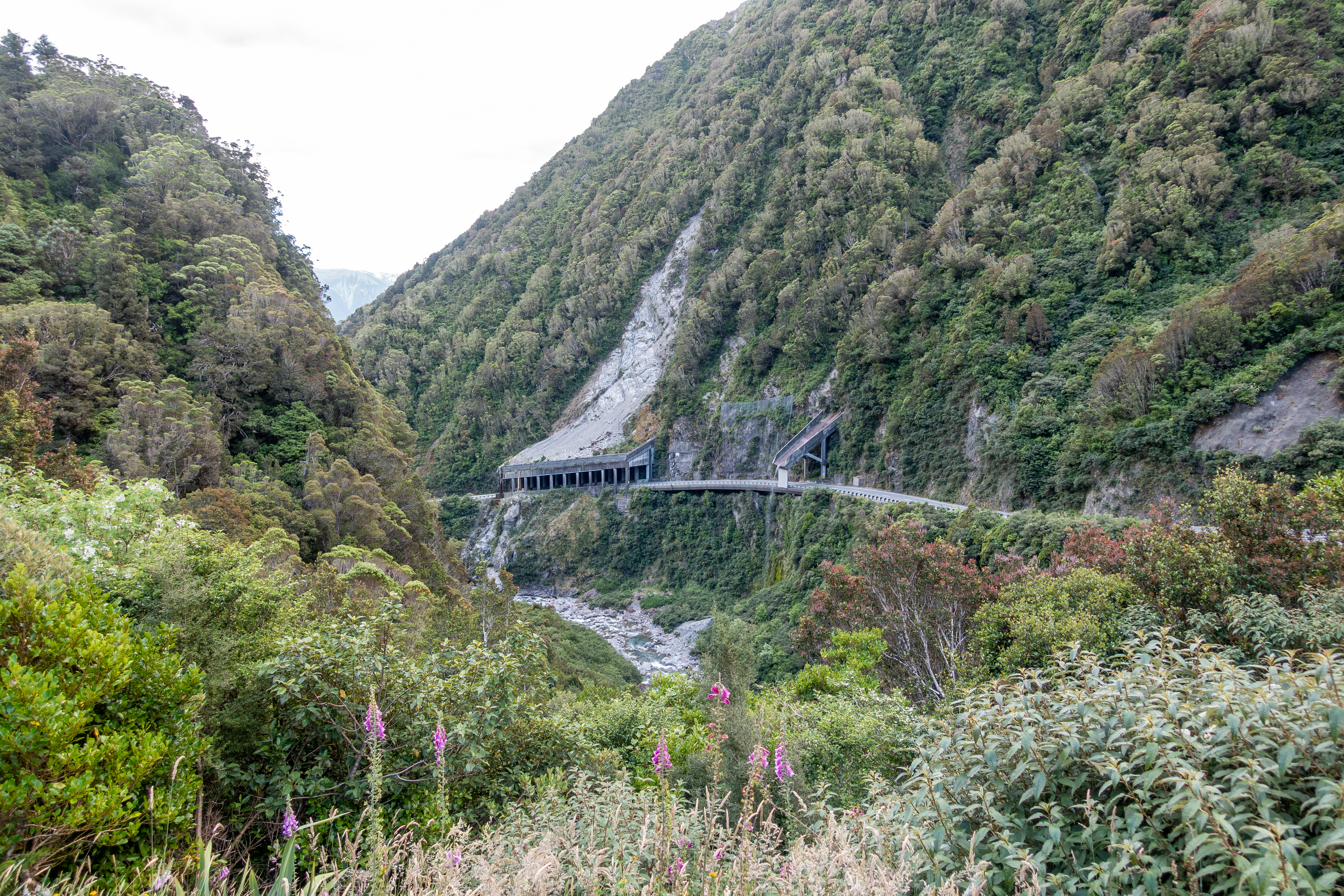
Ōtira River, type locality of T. ingenua.

This species is endemic to New Zealand and has been found in both the North and the South Islands. As well as at the type locality, this species has also been collected at Mount Arthur at an altitude of approximately 1050 m, at Arthur's Pass, at Aoraki / Mount Cook, on the Milford Track, on the Clinton River and near the Homer tunnel.

== Habitat ==
The preferred habitat of this species is native forest.

== Behaviour ==
Adults of this species are on the wing from December to February.
