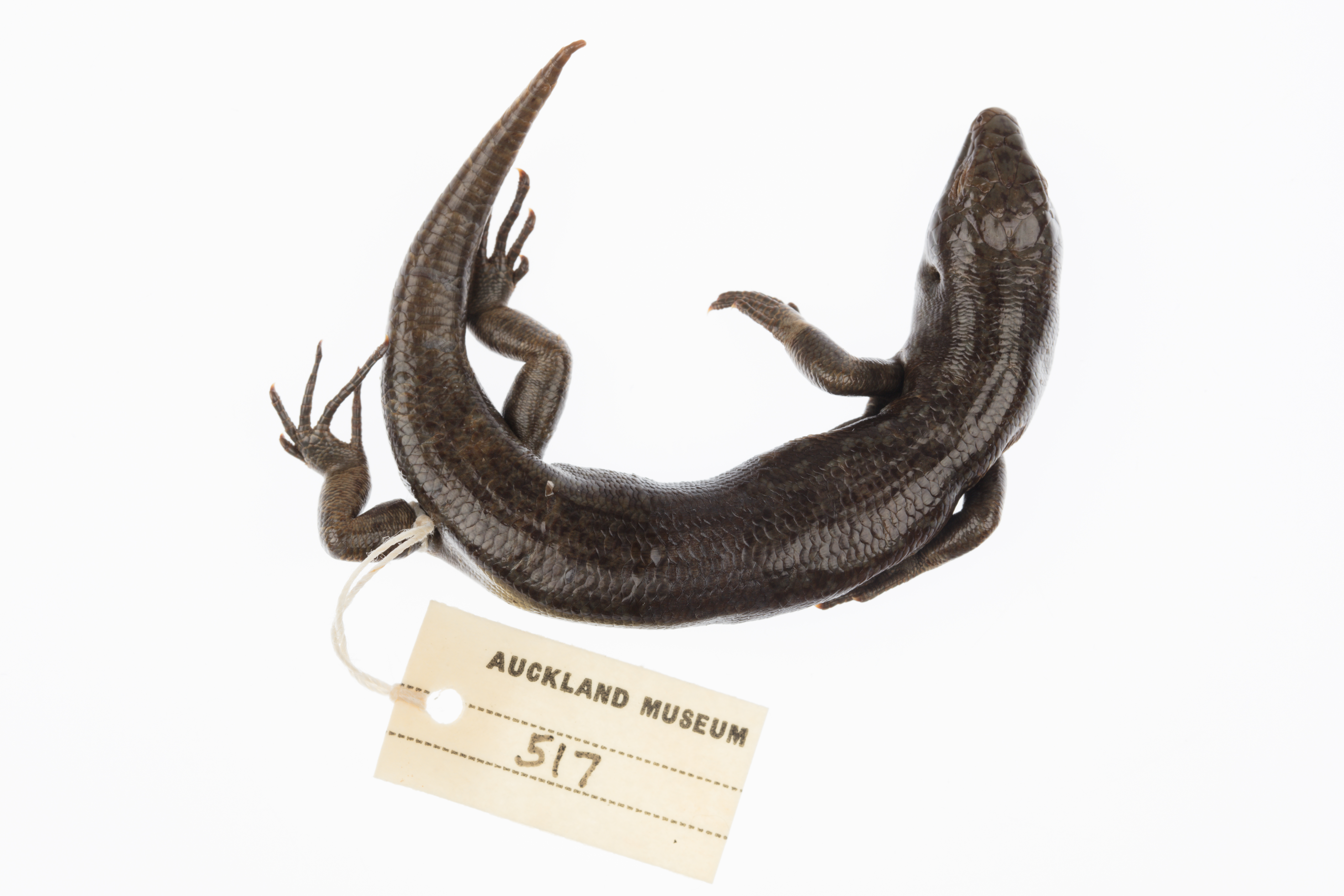

Scientific classification
- Kingdom: Animalia
- Phylum: Chordata
- Class: Reptilia
- Order: Squamata
- Family: Scincidae
- Genus: Oligosoma
- Species: O. nigriplantare

Binomial name
- Oligosoma nigriplantare (Peters, 1874)
- Distribution of Oligosoma nigriplantare on a map of the Chatham Islands Known native range

= Oligosoma nigriplantare =

Species of lizard

Oligosoma nigriplantare, the Chatham Islands skink, is a species of skink in the family Scincidae.

It is the sole reptile species found on the Chatham Islands of New Zealand, where it occurs on all the major islands except Chatham Island itself. Given the geological history of the Chatham Islands, it is assumed that O. n. nigriplantare previously occurred on Chatham Island; however, there are no fossil records or historical reports of O. n. nigriplantare on Chatham Island. Since O. n. nigriplantare is almost locally extinct on Pitt Island as a result of introduced mammals, the presence of introduced mammals on Chatham Island might have resulted in the local extinction of O. n. nigriplantare. On vegetated islands, O. n. nigriplantare inhabits grassland and shrub habitat, but it also occurs on marine rock stacks with sparse vegetation. Substantial morphological variation (body size, colour and colour pattern) is evident within O. n. nigriplantare, potentially indicating morphological evolution following its colonization of the Chatham Islands. Indeed, O. n. nigriplantare (up to 91 mm Snout to Vent Length; SVL) has a substantially larger body size than Oligosoma nigriplantare polychroma (up to 77 mm SVL).

Recent genetic studies indicate that O. n. nigriplantare diverged from Oligosoma nigriplantare polychroma (its nearest relative) 5.86–7.29 million years ago. This pre-dates the emergence date for the Chatham Islands, but indicates that O. n. nigriplantare colonized the Chatham Islands via overwater dispersal on a single occasion. There is substantial morphological variability evident in O. n. nigriplantare, and a shallow level of genetic differential between islands within the Chatham Islands indicating low gene flow between islands, but not speciation between islands. The level of genetic and morphological divergence between O. n. nigriplantare and Oligosoma nigriplantare polychroma might warrant their recognition as distinct species.
