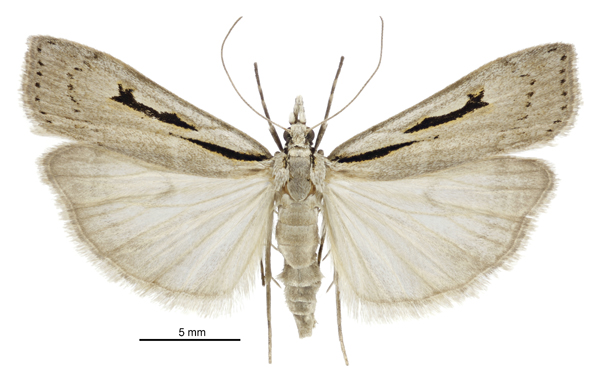
- Female

Scientific classification
- Kingdom: Animalia
- Phylum: Arthropoda
- Clade: Pancrustacea
- Class: Insecta
- Order: Lepidoptera
- Family: Crambidae
- Genus: Scoparia
- Species: S. rotuella

Binomial name
- Scoparia rotuella (C. Felder, R. Felder & Rogenhofer, 1875)

Synonyms
- Crambus rotuellus Felder and Rogenhofer, 1875; Xeroscopa rotuella (Felder and Rogenhofer, 1875); Scoparia rotuellus (Felder and Rogenhofer, 1875)

= Scoparia rotuella =

Species of moth endemic to New Zealand

Scoparia rotuella is a species of moth in the family Crambidae. It was first described by Cajetan Felder, Rudolf Felder and Alois Friedrich Rogenhofer in 1875. It is endemic to New Zealand and, although considered localised, is found throughout the country. As of 2022, the life history of this species is largely unknown, but it has been hypothesised that this species may have two broods a year. Adults are on the wing all year round and are attracted to light.

== Taxonomy ==
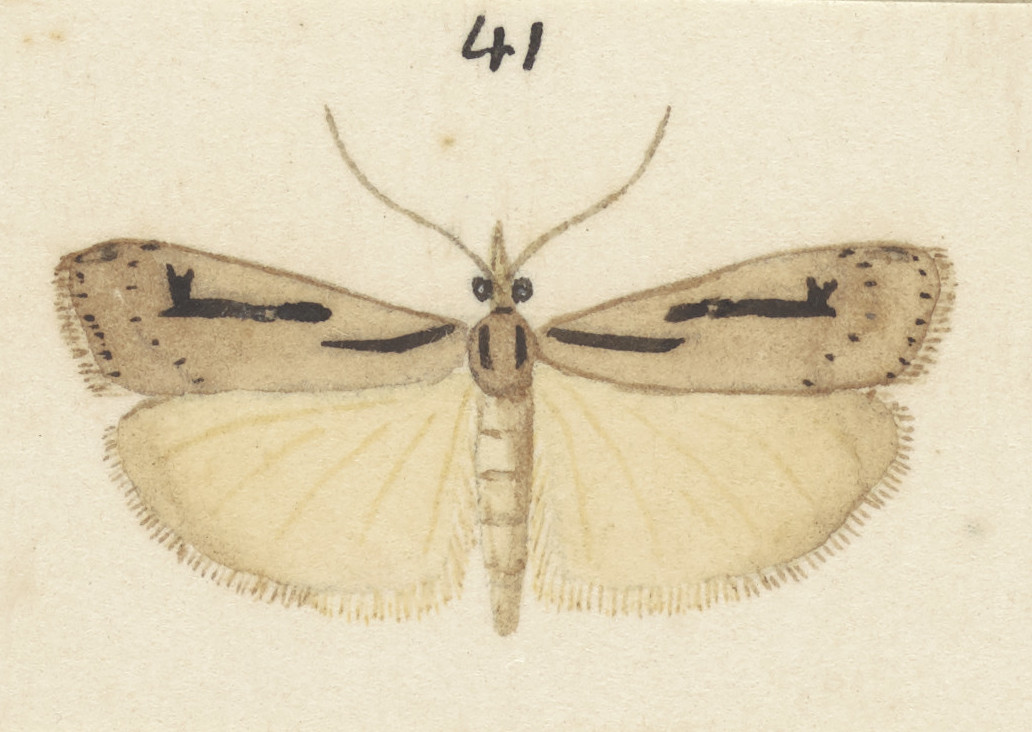
Illustration of S. rotuella by George Hudson.

It was described by Cajetan Felder, Rudolf Felder and Alois Friedrich Rogenhofer in 1875 under the name Crambus rotuellus. In 1885 Edward Meyrick placed this species in the genus Xeroscopa and amended the epithet to rotuella. In 1913 Meyrick again revised the taxonomy of the species and placed it within the genus Scopaira. George Hudson discussed and illustrated this species under the name Scoparia rotuella in his 1928 book The butterflies and moths of New Zealand. The male lectotype, collected in Nelson by T. R. Oxley, is held at the Natural History Museum, London.

== Description ==
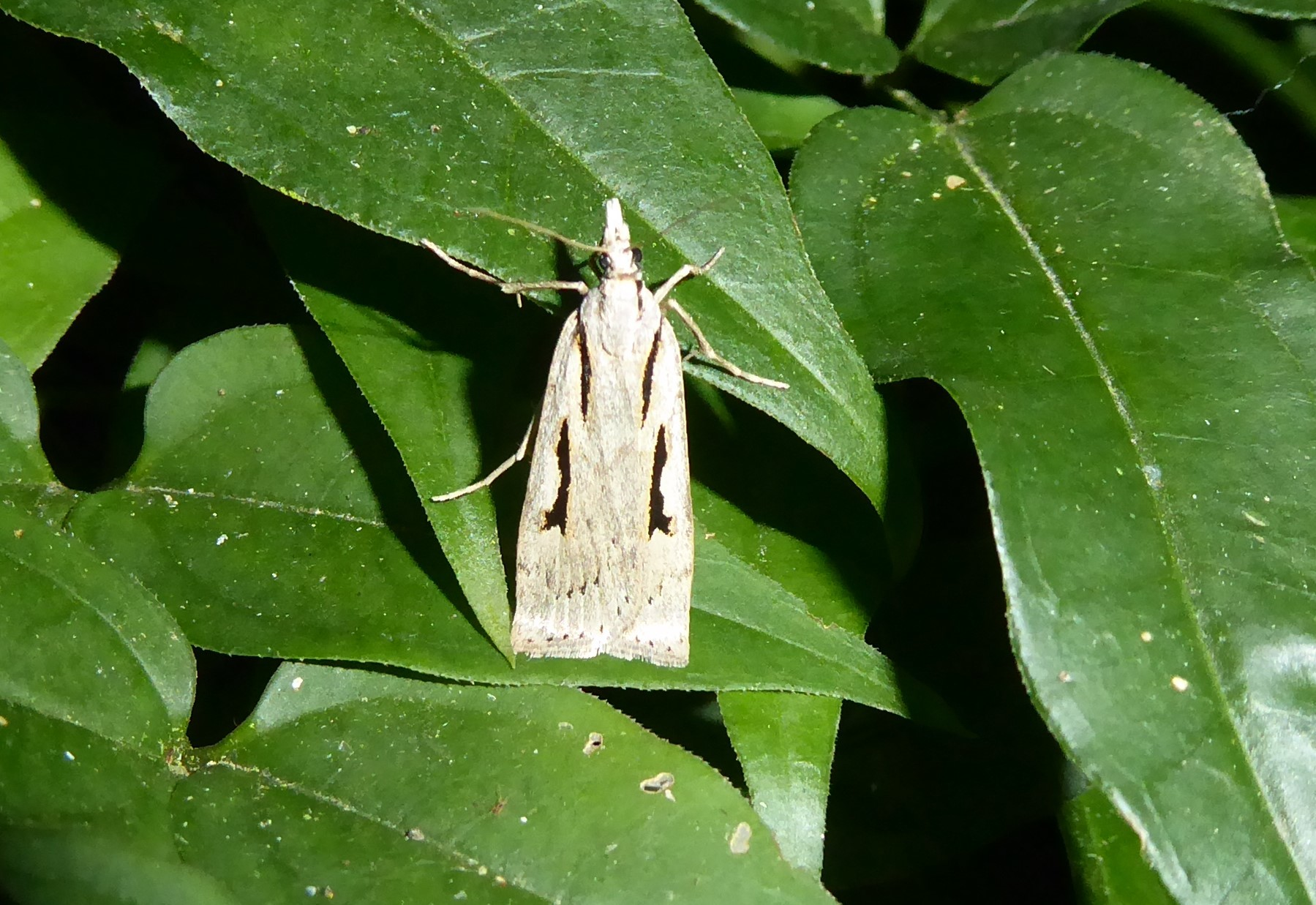
Live S. rotuella.

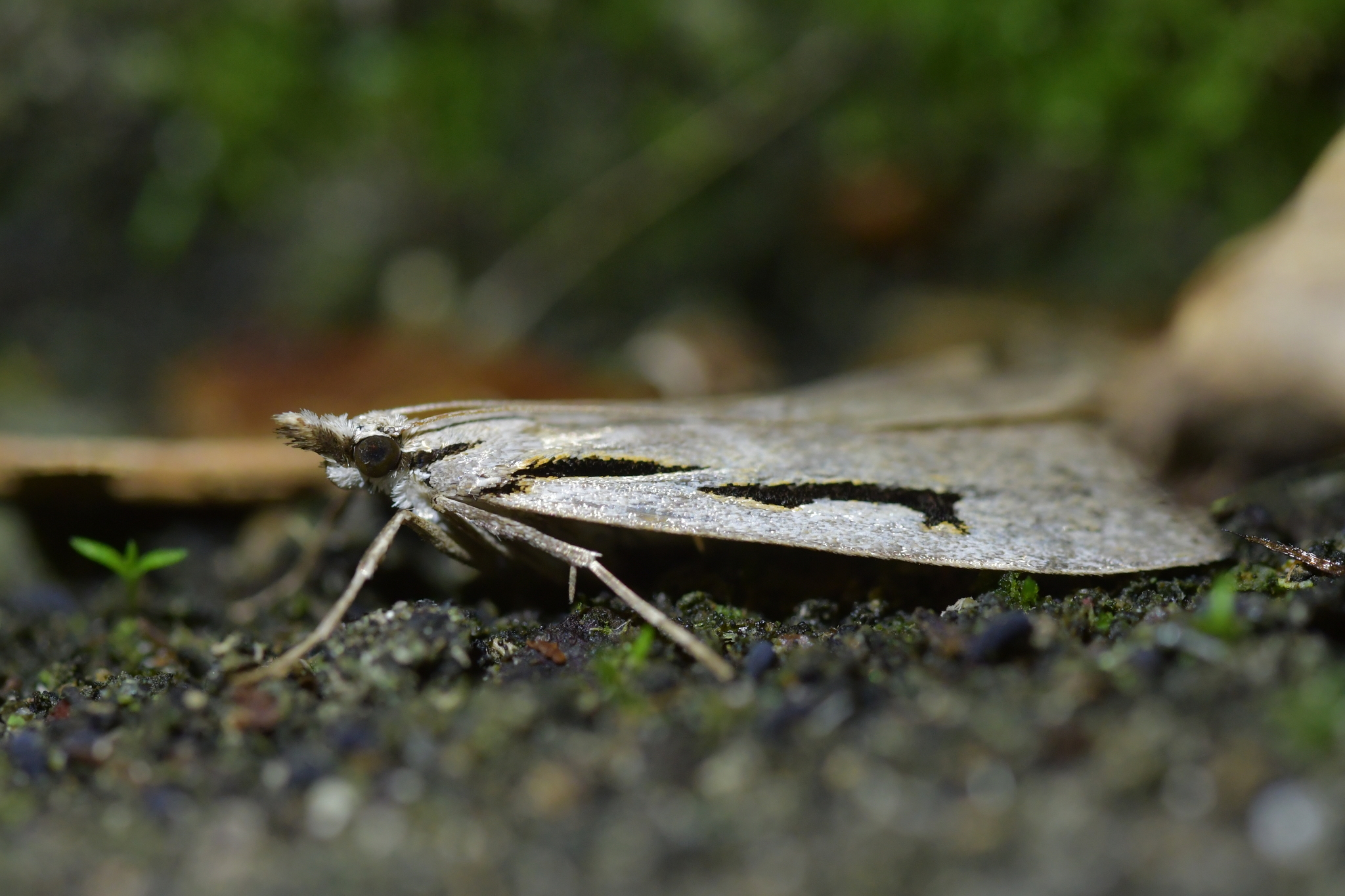
Side view of S. rotuella.

The wingspan is 28–29 mm. The forewings are light greyish ochreous, irrorated (speckled) with white beneath the costa. There is a black median streak from the base of the costa to the disc, margined with clear yellowish ochreous. The first line has the form of a sharply defined black streak, margined with clear yellowish ochreous. The second line is represented by a row of black dots and there is a terminal row of black dots. The hindwings are very pale ochreous grey.

== Distribution ==
S. rotuella is endemic to New Zealand. This species has been observed in the North, South and Stewart Islands as well as on Campbell Island and Chatham Island. It is regarded as being localised, that is restricted to certain localities within those islands. This species has been observed at altitudes ranging from sea-level to elevations of about 1,200 m.

== Behaviour ==
The life history of this species is largely unknown. However it has been hypothesised that there are two broods in a year. The adult moths have been collected all year round. Adults attracted to light and have been collected via a mercury vapour light trap. They have been shown to pollinate Helichrysum selago and Veronica salicifolia.

== Threats ==
Specimens of this species have been tested for Wolbachia infection and one was found to be positive for the bacteria. Wolbachia bacteria are common in reproductive organs of insects and the presence of this bacteria can result in the species suffering from a sex ratio bias in favour if female moths. The lack of male moths can result in a population decline of a species.
