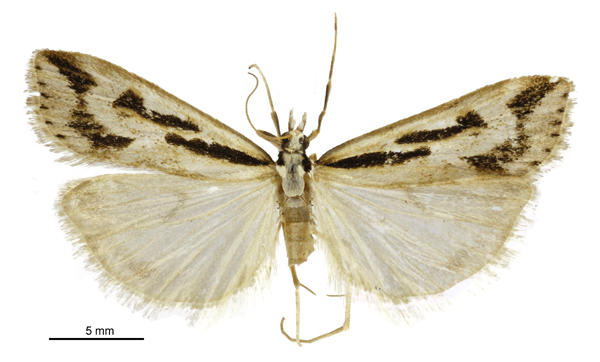
- Male

Scientific classification
- Kingdom: Animalia
- Phylum: Arthropoda
- Class: Insecta
- Order: Lepidoptera
- Family: Crambidae
- Genus: Scoparia
- Species: S. clavata

Binomial name
- Scoparia clavata Philpott, 1912

= Scoparia clavata =

Species of moth

Scoparia clavata is a species of moth of the family Crambidae. It is endemic to New Zealand.

== Taxonomy ==
This species was described by Alfred Philpott in 1912. However the placement of this species within the genus Scoparia is in doubt. As a result, this species has also been referred to as Scoparia (s.l.) clavata.

== Description ==
The wingspan is about 26 mm. The forewings are white, irrorated with brownish-ochreous. The costa is brownish and there is a black median streak from the base of the costa, as well as a black streak in the disc above the middle. All streaks are margined with brownish-ochreous. The hindwings are shining white, but ochreous at the termen. Adults have been recorded on wing in December.
