= Eurythecta eremana =

Scientific classification
- Kingdom: Animalia
- Phylum: Arthropoda
- Class: Insecta
- Order: Lepidoptera
- Family: Tortricidae
- Genus: Eurythecta
- Species: E. eremana

Binomial name
- Eurythecta eremana (Meyrick, 1884)

Synonyms
- Proselena eremana Meyrick, 1884

Species of moth

Eurythecta eremana is a species of moth of the family Tortricidae. It was first described by Edward Meyrick in 1884. is found in New Zealand. The habitat consists of swampy areas.

The wingspan is 12–14 mm. The forewings are uniform brownish ochreous. The hindwings are dark grey. Adults have been recorded on wing in December and January.
