= Hunter Mountains =

Mountains in New Zealand

- Tuturau
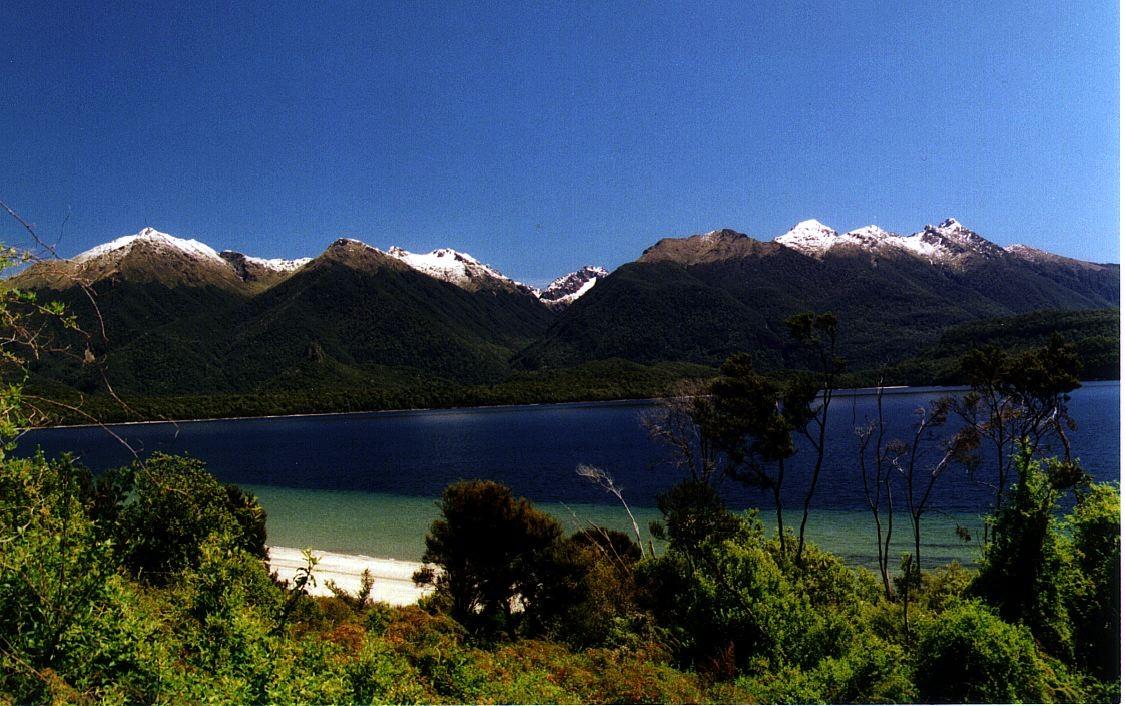
- The Hunter Mountains from Frasers Beach Lake Manapouri, Mount Moturau is on the far left and Cone Peak is on the far right

Highest point
- Peak: Unnamed peak
- Elevation: 1,804 m (5,919 ft)
- Coordinates: 45°39′47″S 167°24′29″E

Naming
- Etymology: Named by James McKerrow in honour of John Hunter

Geography
- Location within New Zealand
- Location: Southwestern South Island
- Country: New Zealand
- Range coordinates: 45°37′37″S 167°23′42″E

Geology
- Orogeny: Tectonic uplift

The Hunter Mountains of Fiordland, New Zealand, were named by surveyor James McKerrow after the famous anatomist John Hunter. The Hunter Mountain Range covers an area between The South Arm and Hope Arm of Lake Manapouri south to the Green Lake.

The Hunters contains several impressive peaks, 1,495 metres (4,905 ft) Cone Peak, 1,497 metres (4,911 ft) Mount Moturau, 1,639 metres (5,377 ft) Mount Crescent, 1,645 metres (5,397 ft) Mt Burns, 1,695 metres (5,561 ft) Eldrig Peak, the Highest Named Point is 1,749 metres (5,738 ft) Mt Flat, the highest point is an 1,804 metres (5,919 ft) unnamed peak at the head of the Garnoch Burn. Mount Moturau is accessible Via the Bicycle spur track from Hope Arm and Mt Burns is very accessible Via the Borland Saddle Road, built through Fiordland National Park in the 1960s for the construction of the power pylons and power pines for the Manapouri Hydroelectric Power Station, and is open to the public throughout the summer months.

== Fauna ==
Giant Snails known as Powelliphanta spedeni are found in the Green Lake area of the Hunter Mountains.

The skink species Oligosoma nigriplantare polychroma (related to the Chatham Islands skink) inhabit the tussock grasslands areas from Lake Manapouri to Lake Monowai.

The Short Horned Grasshopper Alpinacris tumidicauda ranges throughout the Hunter Mountains.

The endemic moth species Pyrgotis consentiens and Proteodes clarkei are found in the Hunter Mountains.
