= Trapping =

Use of a device to remotely catch an animal

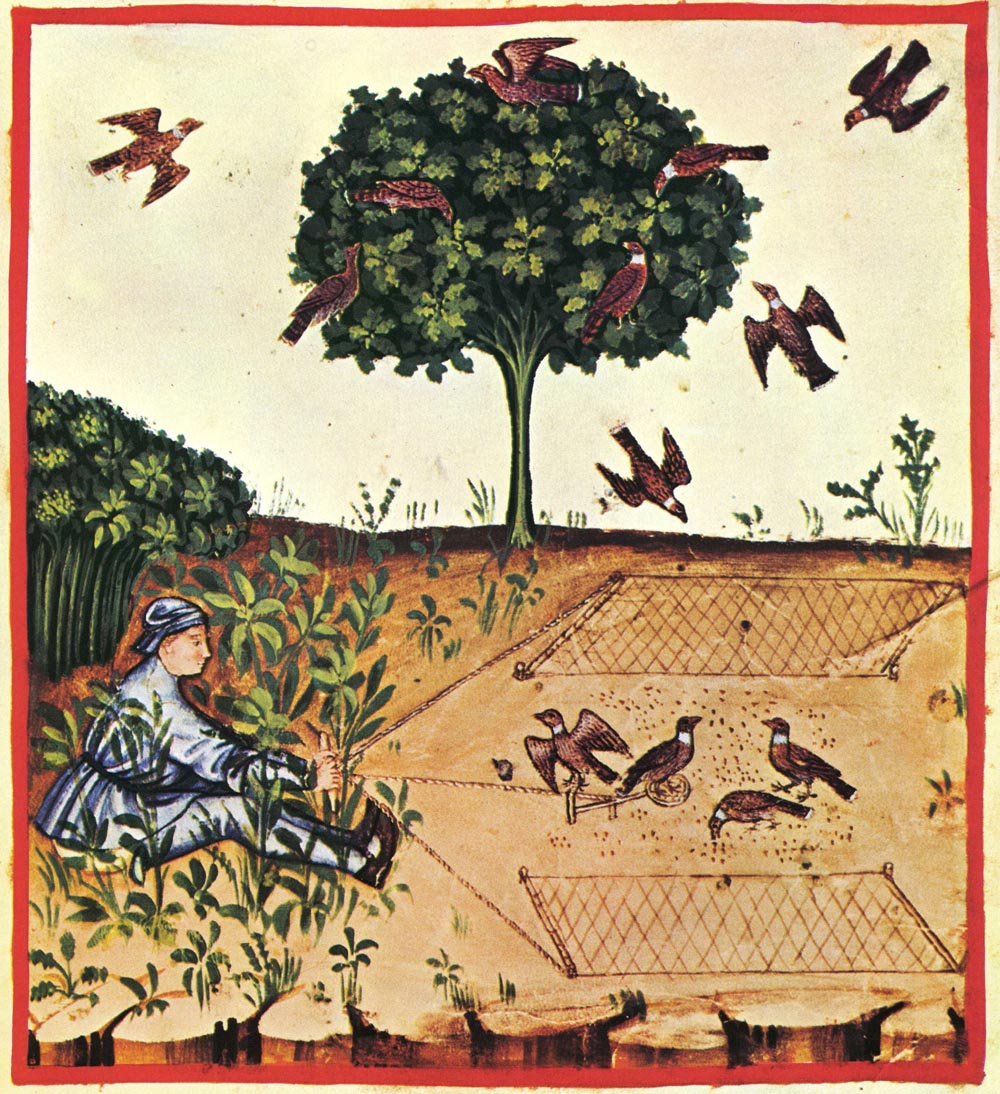
Trap nets used to trap birds (tacuinum sanitatis casanatensis); 14th century

Animal trapping, or simply trapping or ginning, is the use of a device to remotely catch and often kill an animal. Animals may be trapped for a variety of purposes, including for meat, fur/feathers, sport hunting, pest control, and wildlife management.

Among trapping methods, some are considered relatively humane while others are seen as excessively cruel. Laws in the European Union and many U.S. states ban traps such as foothold traps, and instead promote body-grip traps, which kill animals quickly and are therefore regarded as more humane. All traps, whether for capture or killing, must be checked at least every 24 hours, and humane guidelines recommend more frequent checks and, where possible, the use of monitoring devices that alert when a trap is triggered. Because improper trapping can cause severe animal suffering and pose risks to pets, wildlife, and humans, specialized certification programs train professionals in humane and safe pest management.

== History ==
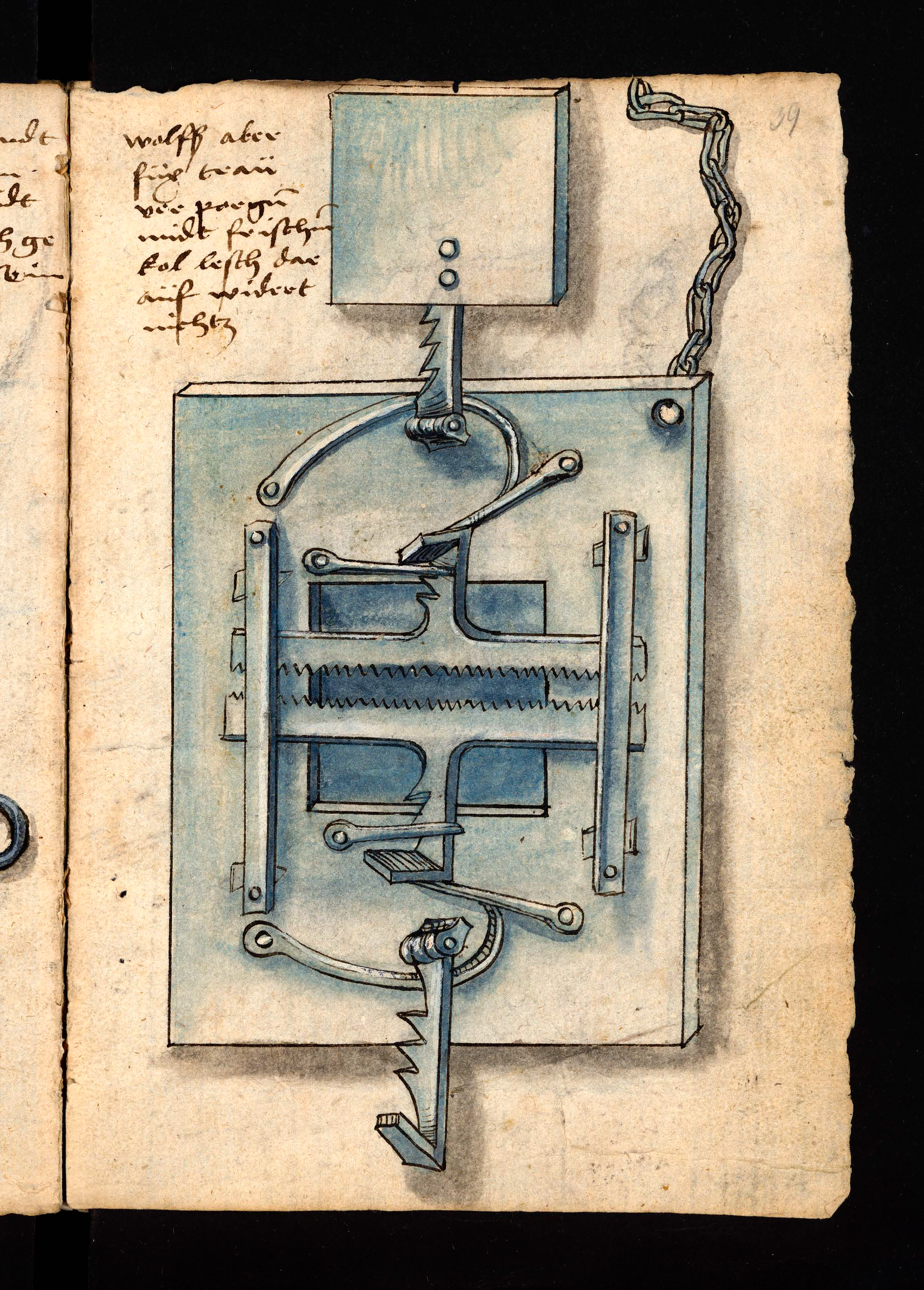
Concept of a sophisticated leghold trap for wolves; Codex Löffelholz, Nuremberg, 1505

Neolithic hunters, including the members of the Cucuteni-Trypillian culture of Romania and Ukraine (c. 5500–2750 BCE), used traps to capture their prey. An early mention in written form is a passage from the self-titled book by Taoist philosopher Zhuangzi which describes Chinese methods used for trapping animals during the 4th century BCE. The Zhuangzi reads: "The sleek-furred fox and the elegantly spotted leopard ... can't seem to escape the disaster of nets and traps." "Modern" steel jaw-traps were first described in western sources as early as the late 16th century. The first mention comes from Leonard Mascall's book on animal trapping. It reads: "a griping trappe made all of yrne, the lowest barre, and the ring or hoope with two clickets" [sic]. The mousetrap, with a strong spring device mounted on a wooden base, was first patented by William C. Hooker of Abingdon, Illinois, in 1894.

== Reasons ==
Trapping is carried out for a variety of reasons. Originally, it was for food, fur, and other animal products. Trapping has since been expanded to encompass pest control, wildlife management, the pet trade, and zoological specimens.

=== Fur clothing ===
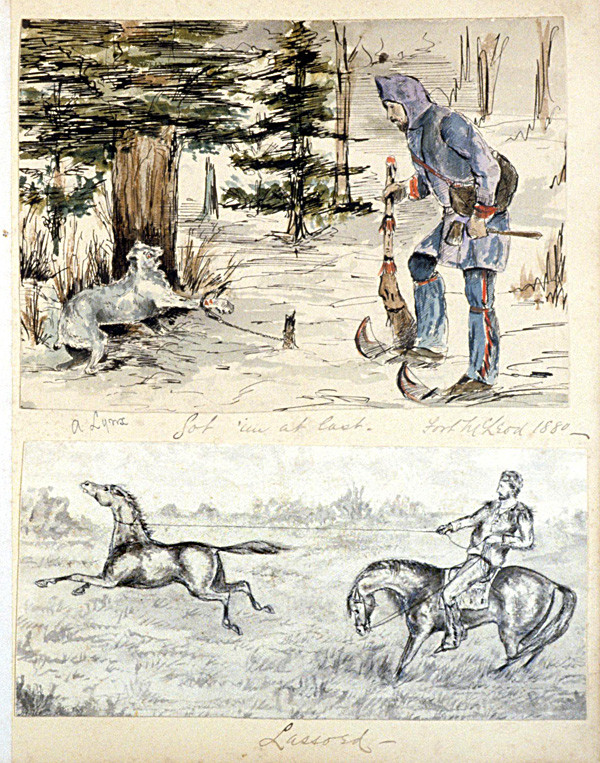
Sketches of life in the Hudson's Bay Company territory, 1880

In the early days of the colonization settlement of North America, the trading of furs was common between the Dutch, French, or English and the indigenous populations inhabiting their respective colonized territories. Many locations where trading took place were referred to as trading posts. Much trading occurred along the Hudson River area in the early 1600s.

In some locations in the US and in many parts of southern and western Europe, trapping generates much controversy because it is a contributing factor to declining populations in some species, such as the Canadian lynx. In the 1970s and 1980s, the threat to lynx from trapping reached a new height when the price for hides rose to as much as $600 each. By the early 1990s, the Canada lynx was a clear candidate for Endangered Species Act (ESA) protection. In response to the lynx's plight, more than a dozen environmental groups petitioned FWS in 1991 to list lynx in the lower 48 states. Fish and Wildlife Services (FWS) regional offices and field biologists supported the petition, but FWS officials in the Washington, D.C., headquarters turned it down. In March 2000, the FWS listed the lynx as threatened in the lower 48.

The prices of fur pelts have significantly declined. Some trappers have considered forgoing trapping because the cost of trapping exceeds the return on the furs sold at the end of the season.

=== Perfume ===
Beaver castors are used in many perfumes as a sticky substance. Trappers are paid by the government of Ontario to harvest the castor sacs of beavers and are paid from 10 to 40 dollars per dry pound when sold to the Northern Ontario Fur Trappers Association.

In the early 1900s, muskrat glands were used in making perfume, or women just crushed the glands and rubbed them onto their body.

=== Pest control ===
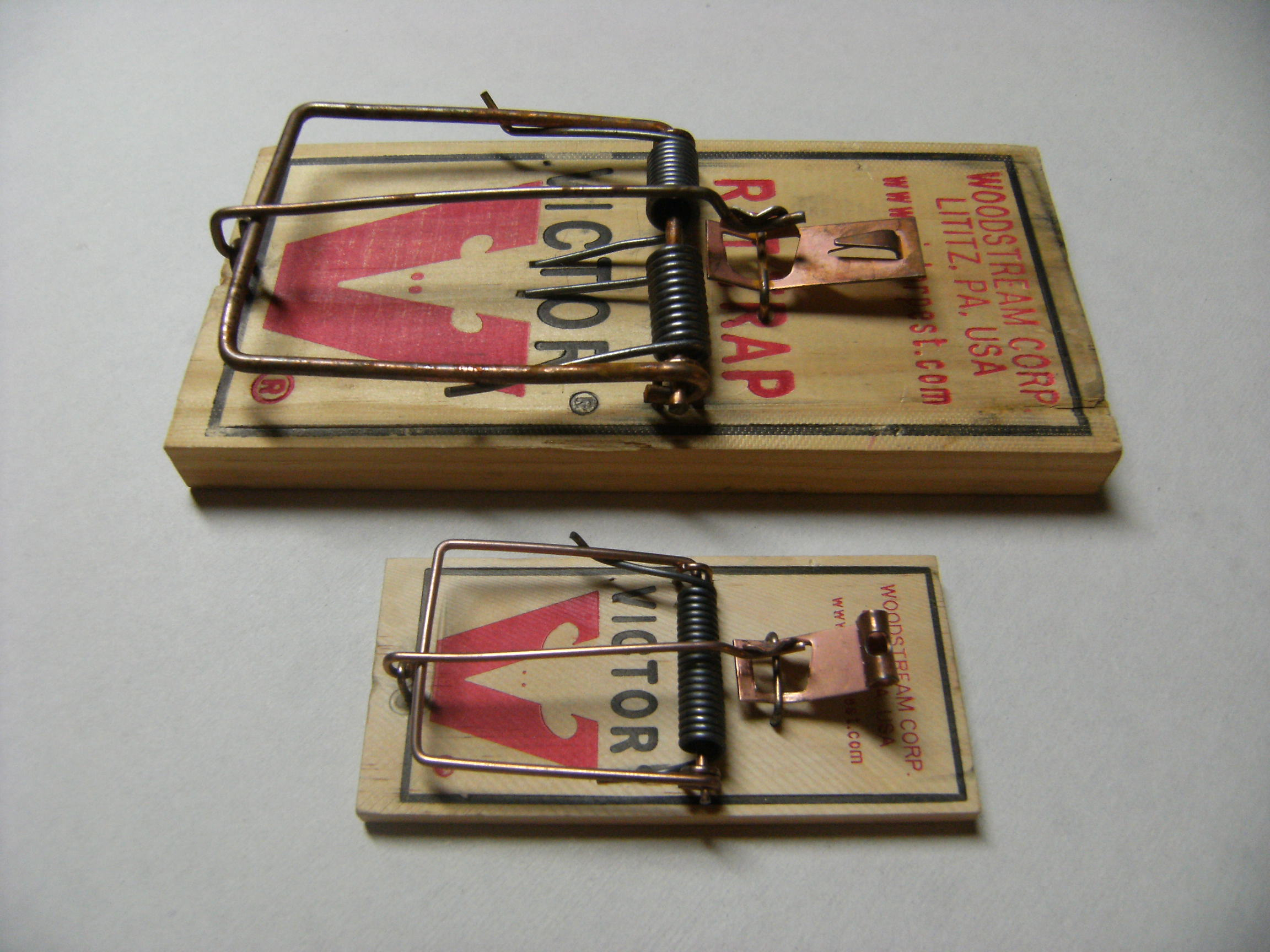
Size comparison between two common types of spring traps: rat trap (above), and the smaller mouse trap (below)

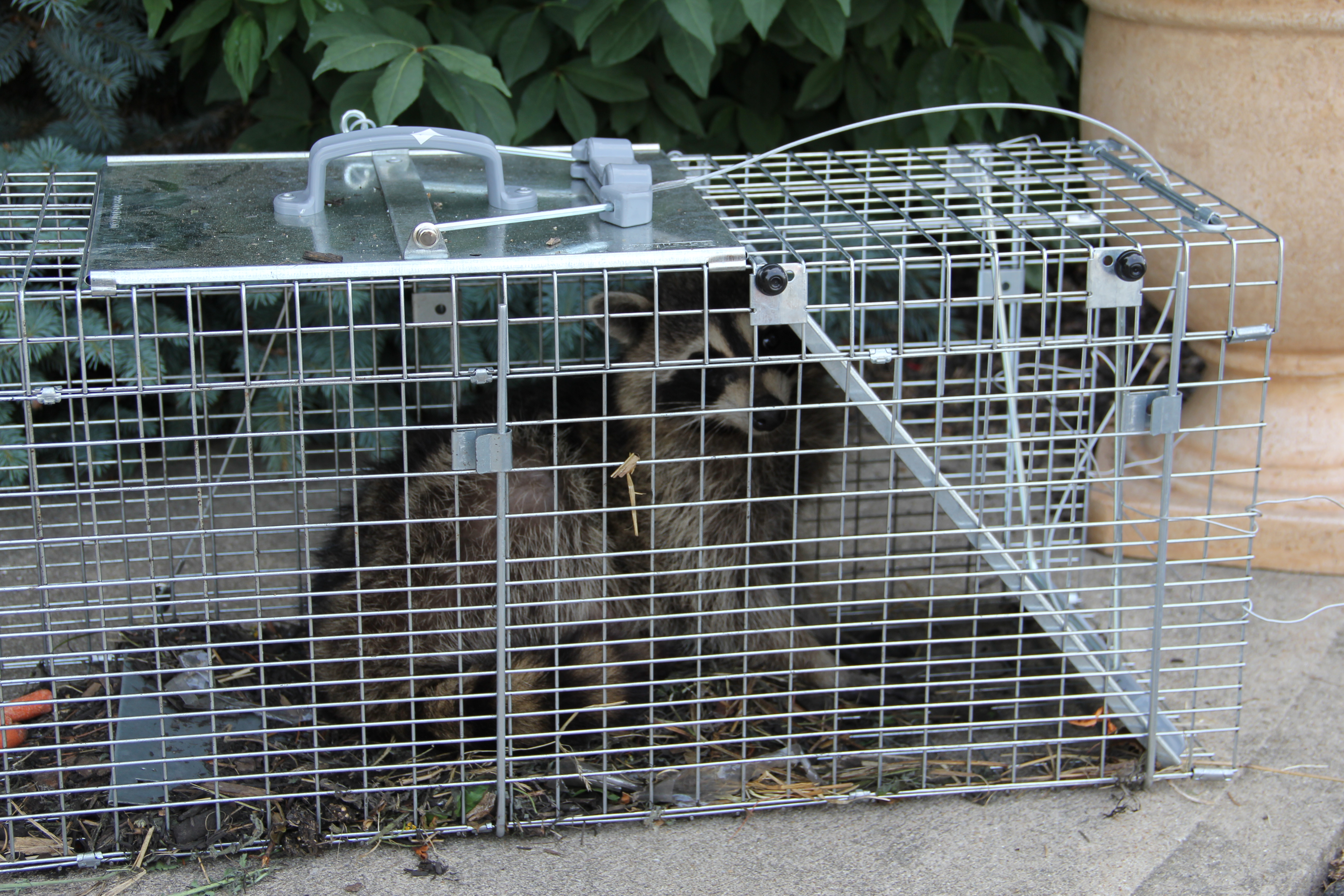
Trapped raccoon

Trapping is regularly used for pest control of beaver, coyote, raccoon, cougar, bobcat, Virginia opossum, fox, squirrel, rat, mouse and mole in order to limit damage to households, food supplies, farming, ranching, and property.

Traps are used as a method of pest control as an alternative to pesticides. Commonly spring traps which hold the animal are used—mousetraps for mice, or the larger rat traps for larger rodents like rats and squirrel. Specific traps are designed for invertebrates such as cockroaches and spiders. Some mousetraps can also double as an insect or universal trap, like the glue traps which catch any small animal that walks upon them.

Although it is common to state that trapping is an effective means of pest control, a counter-example is found in the work of Jon Way, a biologist in Massachusetts. Way reported that the death or disappearance of a territorial male coyote can lead to double litters, and postulates a possible resultant increase in coyote density. Coexistence programs that take this scientific research into account are being pursued by groups such as the Association for the Protection of Fur-Bearing Animals.

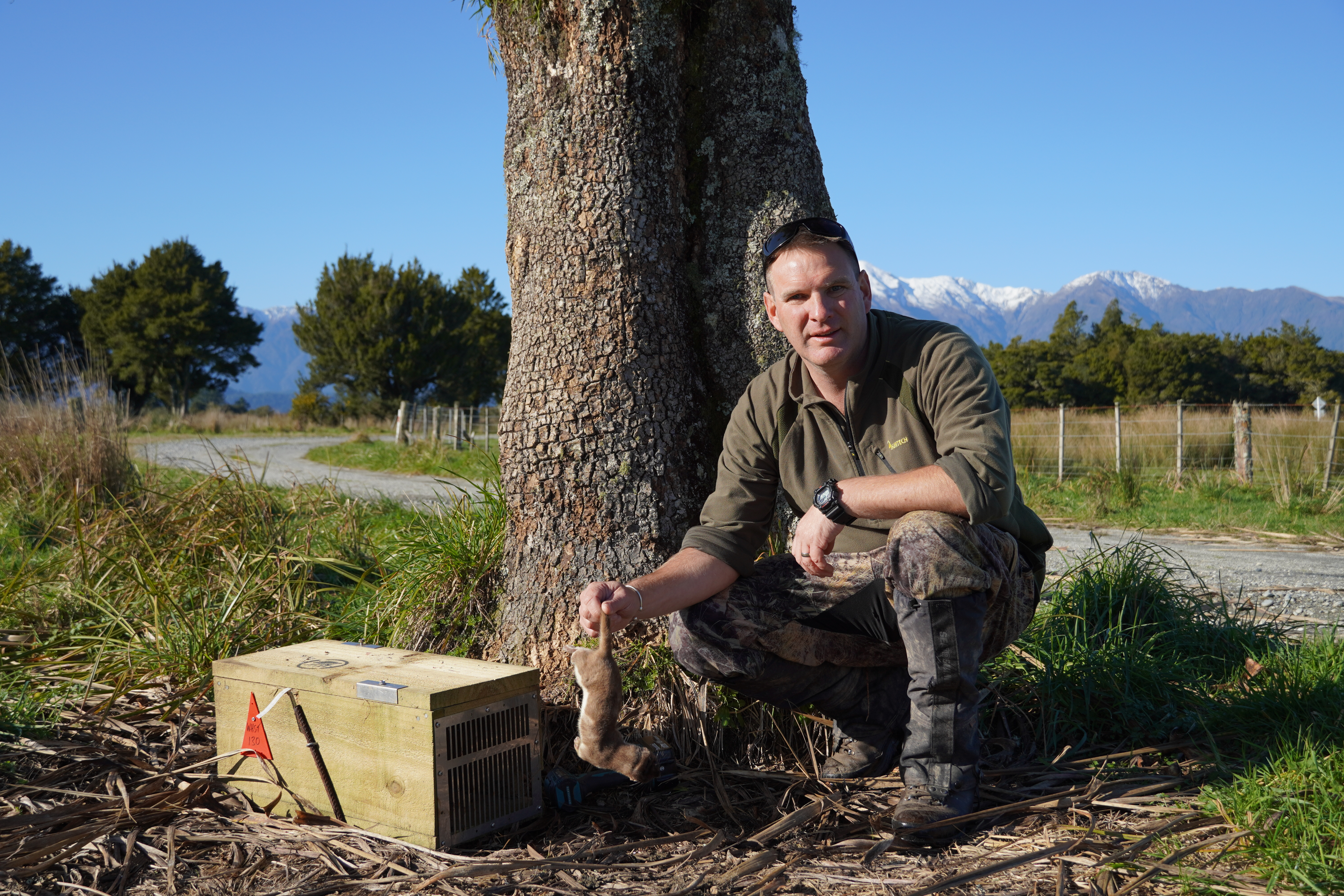
Stoat caught in a pest control trap at Waitangiroto Nature Reserve

=== Wildlife management ===
Animals are frequently trapped in many parts of the world to prevent damage to personal property, including the killing of livestock by predatory animals.

Many wildlife biologists support the use of regulated trapping for the sustained harvest of some species of furbearers. Research shows that trapping can be an effective method of managing or studying furbearers, controlling damage caused by furbearers, and at times reducing the spread of harmful diseases. The research shows that regulated trapping is a safe, efficient, and practical means of capturing individual animals without impairing the survival of furbearer populations or damaging the environment. Wildlife biologists also support regulatory and educational programs, research to evaluate trap performance and the implementation of improvements in trapping technology in order to improve animal welfare.

Trapping is useful to control over population of certain species. Trapping is also used for research and relocation of wildlife. Federal authorities in the United States use trapping as the primary means to control predators that prey on endangered species such as the San Joaquin kit fox (Vulpes macrotis mutica), California least tern (Sterna antillarum browni) and desert tortoise (Gopherus agassizii).

=== Other reasons ===
Animals may be trapped for public display, for natural history displays, or for such purposes as obtaining elements used in the practice of traditional medicine. Trapping may also be done for hobby and conservation purposes.

== Types ==
Most of the traps used for mammals can be divided into six types: foothold traps, body gripping traps, snares, deadfalls, cages, and glue traps. Some of the traditional kinds have changed little since the Stone Age.

=== Foothold traps ===
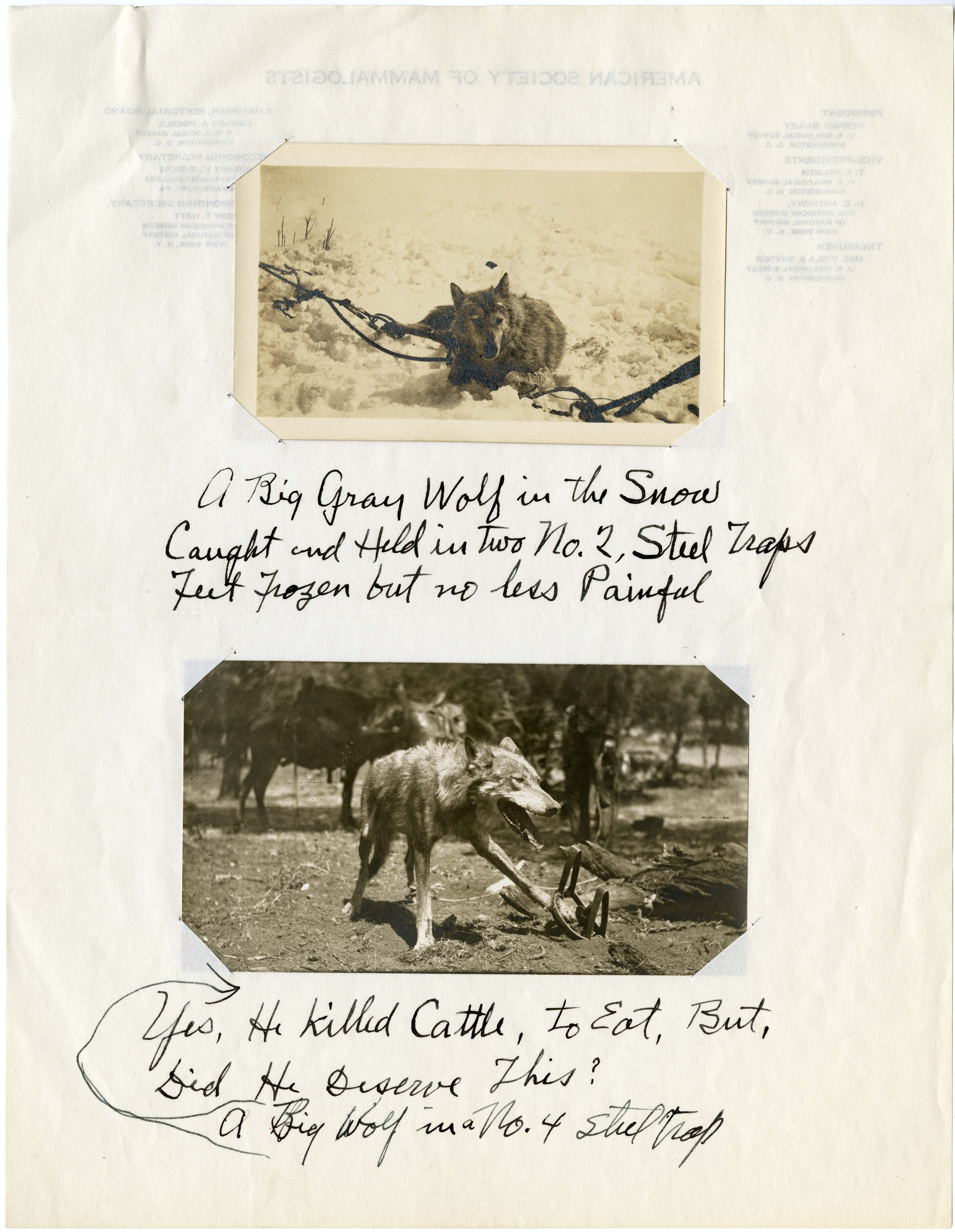
A journal entry featuring photographs of wolves in traps by Vernon Orlando Bailey, 1909–1918

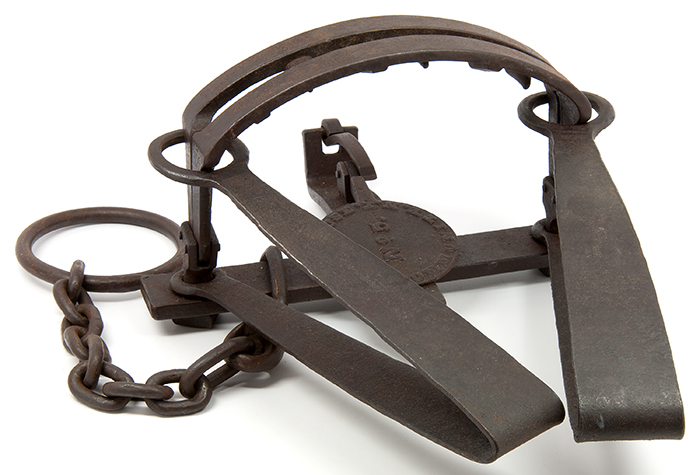
Double spring steel bear trap (no. 5, S. Newhouse) made at the Oneida Community in Oneida, New York, during the mid-nineteenth century. The trap features a chain with a swivel snap at one end and a ring at the other; the spikes on its jaws point inward. Traps of this kind were commonly used for black bear trapping and were set with clamps (these types are no longer used).

Setting and triggering a "gin" or foothold trap, demonstrated at the Black Country Living Museum

Foothold traps were invented in the 17th century for use against humans, to keep poachers out of European estates. The device uses a pressure plate between two metal arms, or "jaws", lined with spiked protrusions, or "teeth". Once the plate has been stepped on, the arms close on the ensnared person or animal's foot. Blacksmiths made traps of iron in the early 1700s for trappers. By the 1800s, companies began to manufacture steel foothold traps. Traps are designed in different sizes for different sized animals.

In recent decades, the use of foothold traps in trapping and hunting has become controversial. Anti-fur campaigns have protested foothold traps as inhumane, with some claiming that an animal caught in a foothold trap will frequently chew off its leg to escape the trap. The practice has been banned in 101 countries as well as 10 states in the United States.

Modern variations of the foothold trap have been designed to reduce instances of the animal fighting the trap, possibly injuring itself or getting loose in the process. These include traps with offset jaws and lamination, which decrease pressure on the animals' legs, and padded jaws with rubber inserts, which reduce animal injuries. Manufacturers of traps designed to work only on raccoons are referred to as dog-proof. These traps are small, and rely on the raccoon's grasping nature to trigger the trap.

=== Body gripping/conibear traps ===
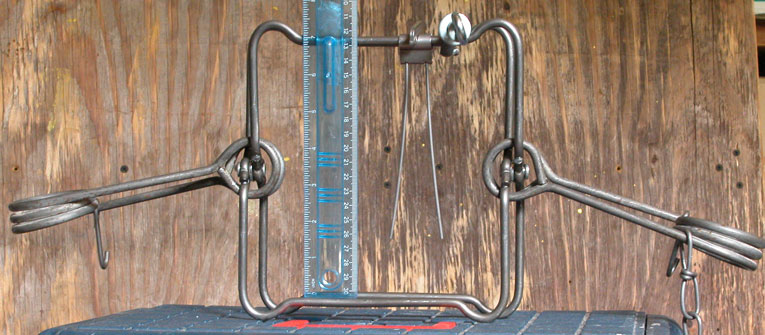
Conibear model 220 body-gripping trap, set

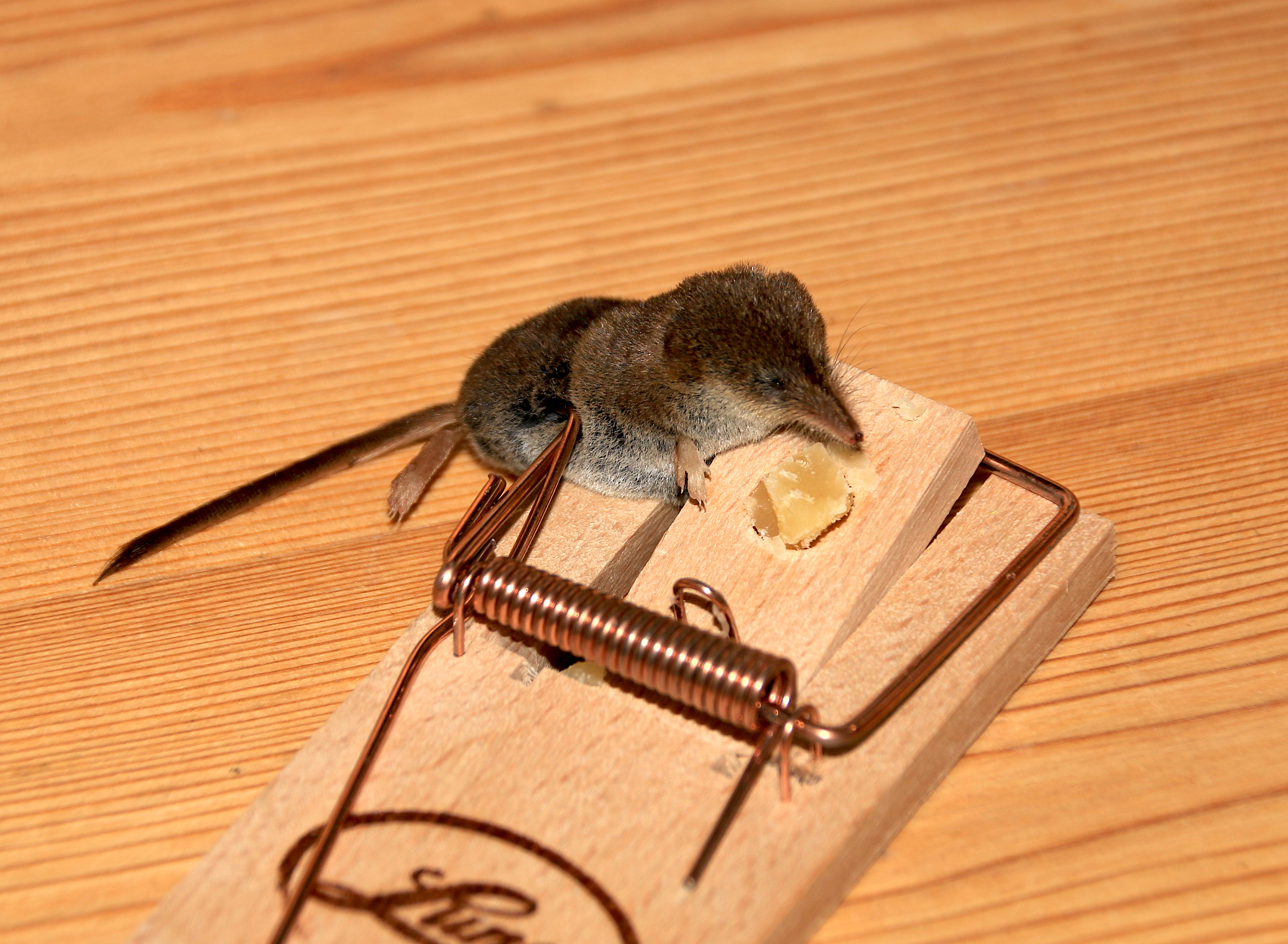
Trapped shrew

Body-gripping traps are designed to kill animals quickly. They are often called "Conibear" traps after Canadian inventor Frank Conibear who began their manufacture in the late 1950s as the Victor-Conibear trap. Many trappers consider these traps to be one of the best trapping innovations of the 20th century; when they work as intended, animals that are caught squarely on the neck are killed quickly, and are therefore not left to suffer or given a chance to escape.

The general category of body-gripping traps may include snap-type mouse and rat traps, but the term is more often used to refer to the larger, all-steel traps that are used to catch fur-bearing animals. These larger traps are made from bent round steel bars. These traps come in several sizes including model #110 or #120 at about 5 by 5 inches (130 by 130 mm) for muskrat and mink, model #220 at about 7 by 7 inches (180 by 180 mm) for raccoon and possum, and model #330 at about 10 by 10 inches (250 by 250 mm) for beaver and otter.

An animal may be lured into a body-gripping trap with bait, or the trap may be placed on an animal path to catch the animal as it passes. In any case, it is important that the animal be guided into the correct position before the trap is triggered. The standard trigger is a pair of wires that extend between the jaws of the set trap. The wires may be bent into various shapes, depending on the size and behavior of the target animal. Modified triggers include pans and bait sticks. The trap is designed to close on the neck and/or torso of an animal. When it closes on the neck, it closes the trachea and the blood vessels to the brain, and often fractures the spinal column; the animal loses consciousness within a few seconds and dies soon thereafter. If it closes on the foot, leg, snout, or other part of an animal, the results are less predictable.

Trapping ethics call for precautions to avoid the accidental killing of non-target species (including domestic animals and people) by body-gripping traps.

The term "body-gripping trap" (and its variations including "body gripping", "body-grip", "body grip", etc.) is often used by animal-protection advocates to describe any trap that restrains an animal by holding onto any part of its body. In this sense, the term is defined to include foothold/foothold traps, Conibear-type traps, snares, and cable restraints; it does not include cage traps or box traps that restrain animals solely by containing them inside the cages or boxes without exerting pressure on the animals; it generally does not include suitcase-type traps that restrain animals by containing them inside the cages under pressure.

=== Deadfall traps ===
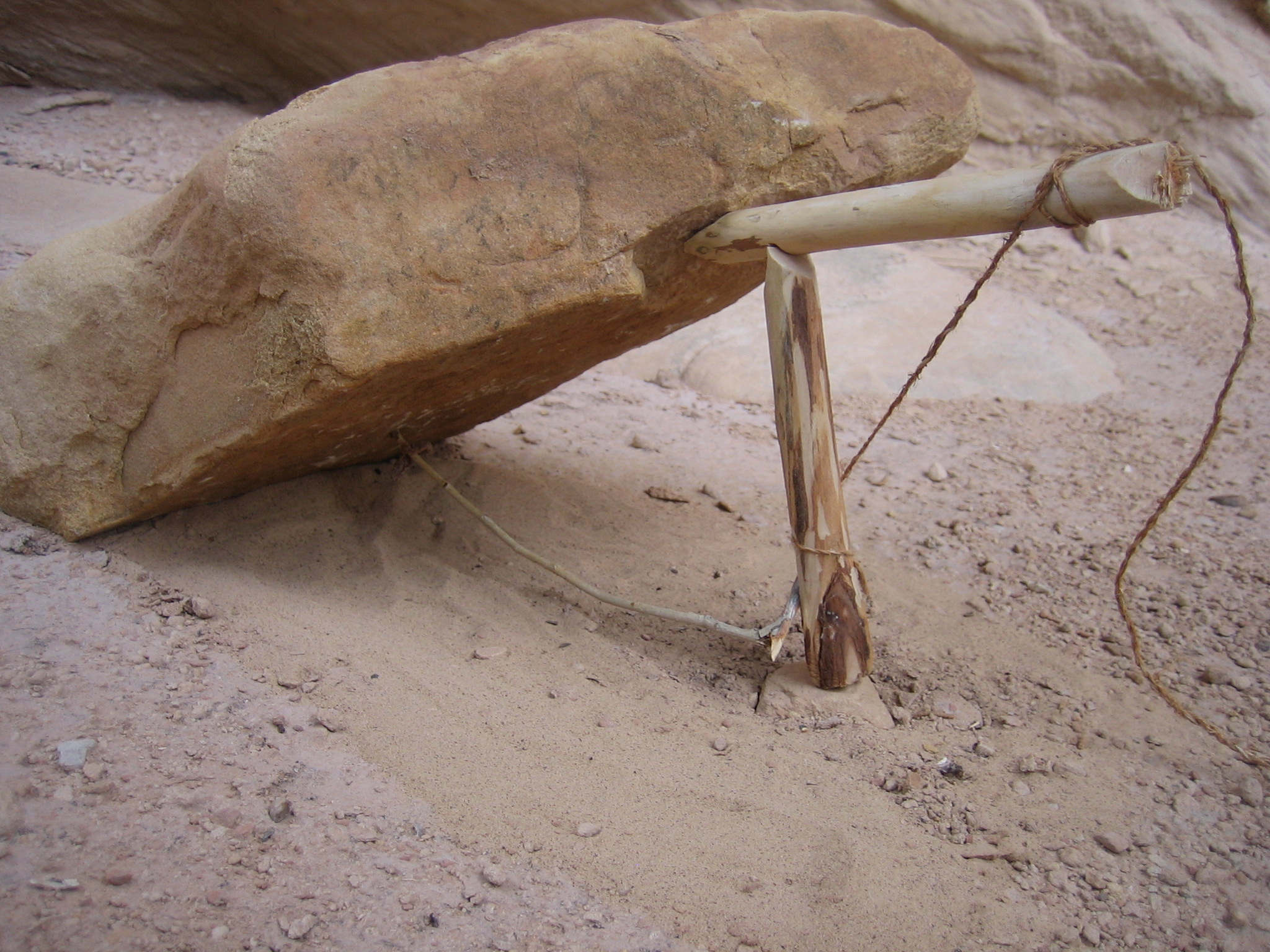
A small Paiute-style deadfall trap, made with dogbane cordage.

A deadfall is a heavy rock or log that is tilted at an angle and held up with sections of branches, with one of them serving as a trigger. When the animal moves the trigger, which may have bait on or near it, the rock or log falls, crushing the animal.

The figure '4' trap consists of three sticks oriented into the shape of the numeral 4. One stick holds a relatively large weight. Some bait is fastened to the trigger stick. When an animal disturbs the bait the trap is sprung. The trap is effectively a lever. One of the sticks is the fulcrum (the upright portion of the numeral), one is the beam (the diagonal portion of the symbol 4), and the "trigger stick" (the horizontal bar) is, ultimately, the effort. One end of the beam holds up the rock. This is the load. The effort is applied to the other end of the diagonal stick. This makes it a Class 1 lever. The section of the beam on the rock end is much shorter than the trigger end. The effort is supplied by the friction of the two pieces of wood on the other side of the trap. The effort gains its strength from the notched union it shares with the upright stick that is also the fulcrum. A flat portion of the trigger stick is placed into a square surface on the fulcrum stick to hold the system together.

Also popular, and easier to set, is the Paiute deadfall, consisting of three long sticks, plus a much shorter stick, along with a cord or fiber material taken from the bush to interconnect the much shorter stick (sometimes called catch stick or trigger stick) with one of the longer sticks, plus a rock or other heavy object.

=== Snares ===
Snares are anchored cable or wire nooses set to catch wild animals such as squirrels and rabbits. In the US, they are most commonly used for capture and control of surplus furbearers and especially for food collection. They are also widely used by subsistence and commercial hunters for bushmeat consumption and trade in African forest regions and in Cambodia.

Snares are one of the simplest traps and are very effective. They are cheap to produce and easy to set in large numbers. A snare traps an animal around the neck or the body; a snare consists of a noose made usually by wire or a strong string. Snares are widely criticised by animal welfare groups for their cruelty. UK users of snares accept that over 40% of animals caught in some environments will be non-target animals, although non-target captures range from 21% to 69% depending on the environment. In the US, non-target catches reported by users of snares in Michigan were 17 ± 3%.

Snares are regulated in many jurisdictions, but are illegal in other jurisdictions, such as in much of Europe. Different regulations apply to snares in those areas where they are legal. In Iowa, snares have to have a "deer stop" which stops a snare from closing all the way. In the United Kingdom, snares must be "free-running" so that they can relax once an animal stops pulling, thereby allowing the trapper to decide whether to kill the animal or release it. Following a consultation on options to ban or regulate the use of snares, the Scottish Executive announced a series of measures on the use of snares, such as the compulsory fitting of safety stops, ID tags and marking areas where snaring takes place with signs. In some jurisdictions, swivels on snares are required, and dragging (non-fixed) anchors are prohibited.

=== Trapping pit ===
Trapping pits are deep pits dug into the ground, or built from stone, in order to trap animals. Like cage traps they are usually employed for catching animals without harming them.

=== Cage traps (live traps) ===
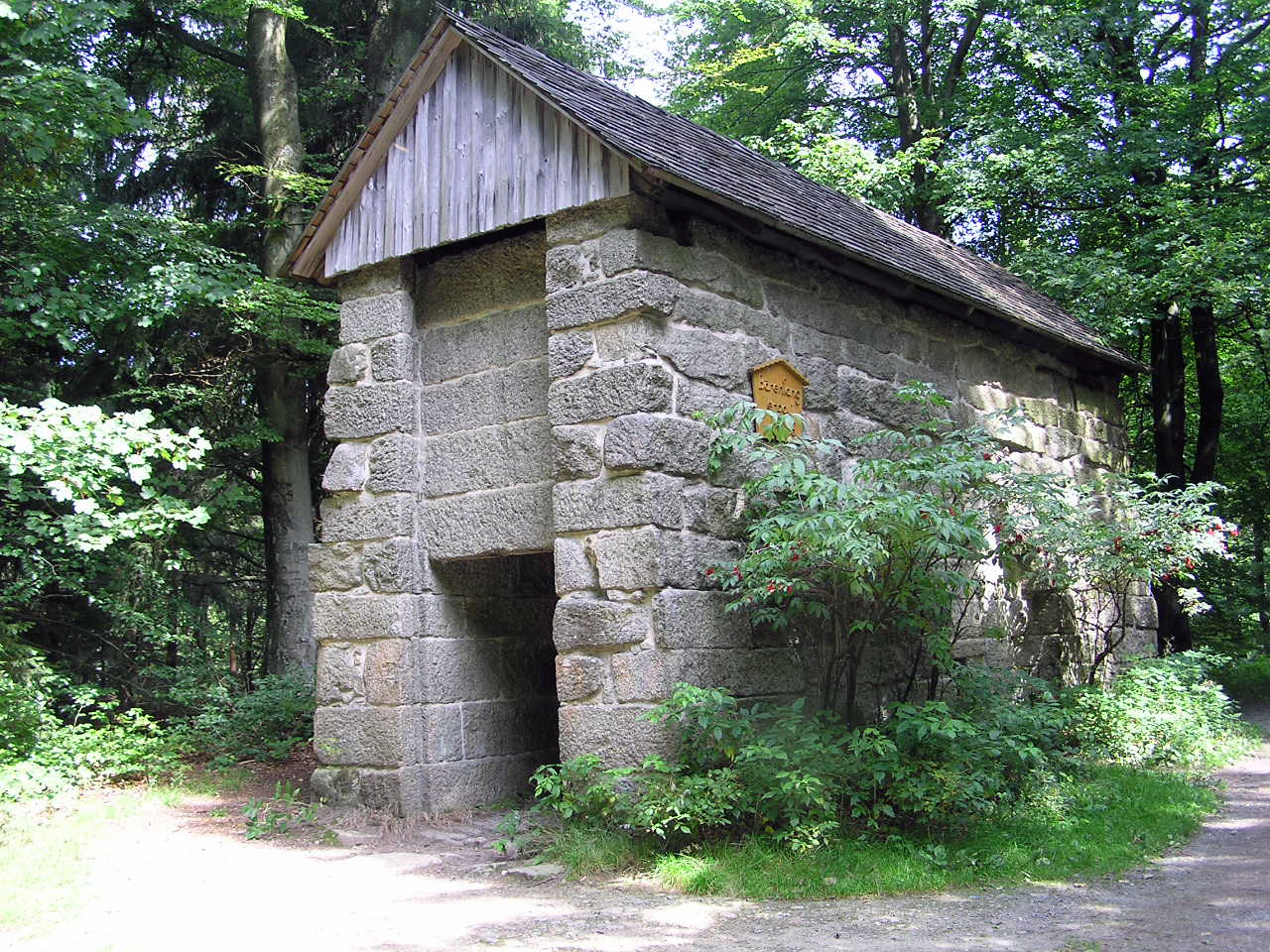
Bear trap at Großer Waldstein in Germany

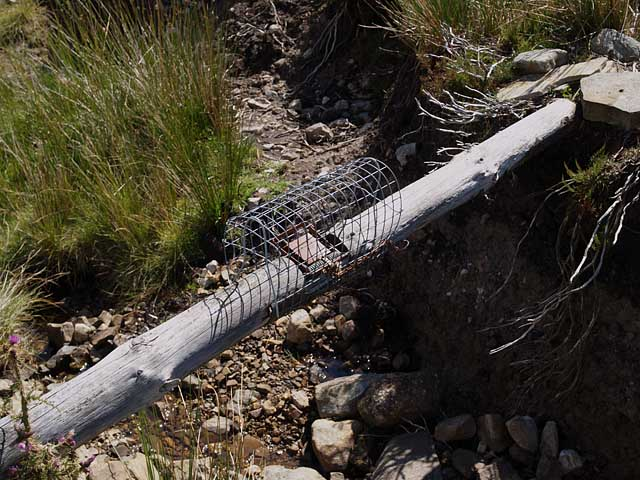
A British spring trap set in a wire tunnel for small mammals

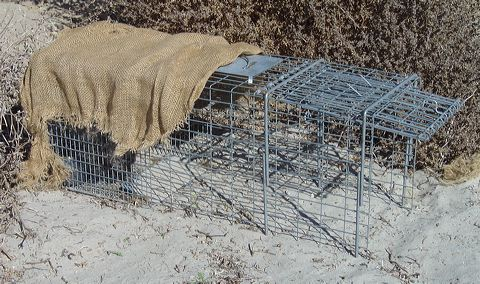
Live trap with shade cloth to protect animal from heat.

Cage traps are designed to catch live animals in a cage. They are usually baited, sometimes with food bait and sometimes with a live "lure" animal. Common baits include cat food and fish. Cage traps usually have a trigger located in the back of the cage that causes a door to shut; some traps with two doors have a trigger in the middle of the cage that causes both doors to shut. In either type of cage, the closure of the doors and the falling of a lock mechanism prevents the animal from escaping by locking the door(s) shut.

=== Cage-trap for squirrels ===
With two doors open, the squirrel can see through the opening on the opposite end. Peanut butter is placed in the trap as bait to attract the squirrel.

In some locations, the traps can be placed in alignment with a building, wall, or fence (nearly under one edge of a bush). The wall does not present a threat to the squirrel, and the bush reduces the exposure and view of the squirrel. A blind area (by using natural or cardboard materials) surrounding the end of the trap presents a darker, safe hiding space near the trigger and bait of the trap. Where two-door traps are not available, a piece of cardboard held in place with a brick can be put behind the rear of the trap.

=== Glue traps ===
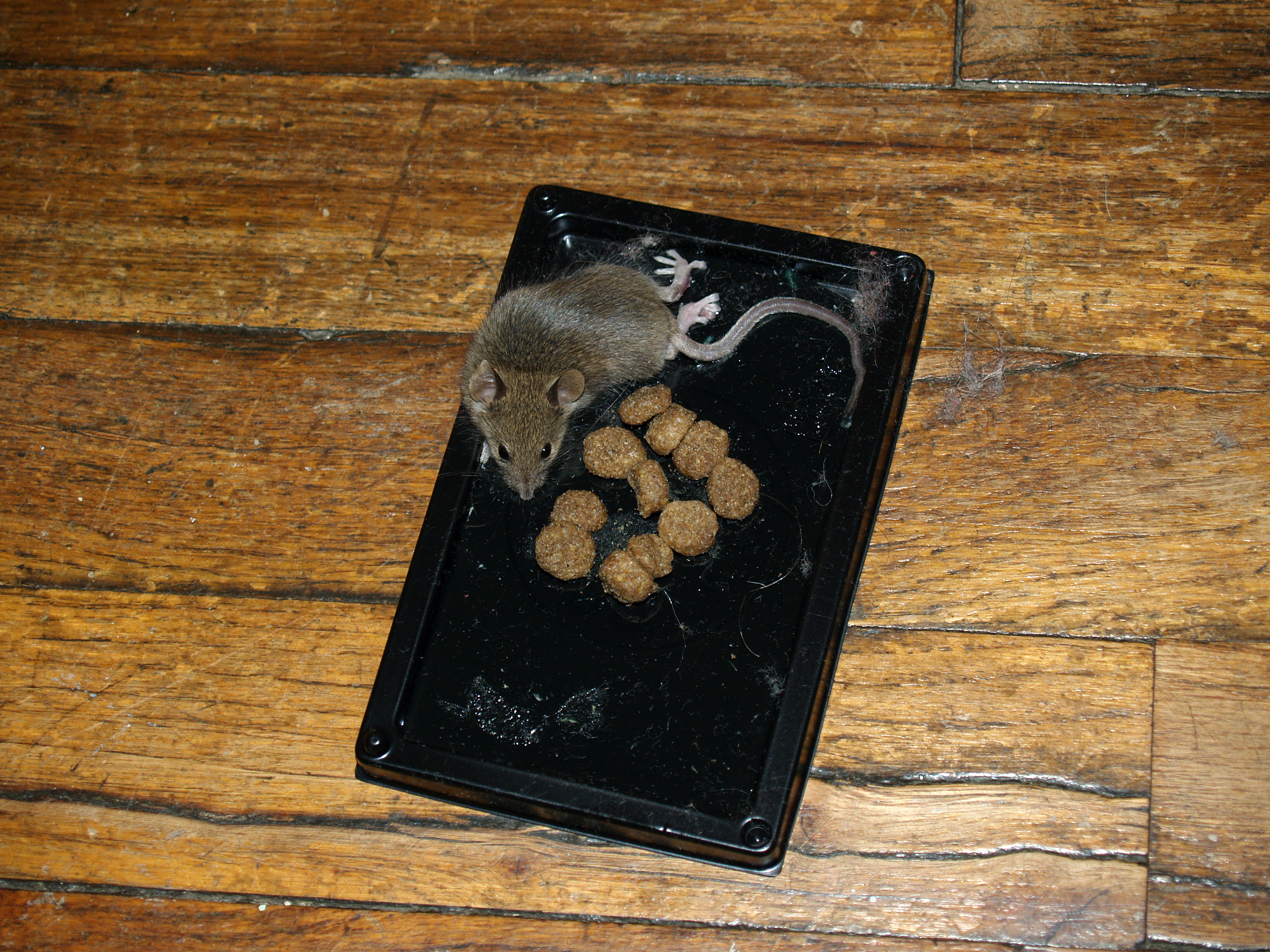
Mouse in glue trap

A glue trap (also known as sticky trap, adhesive trap, or glue board) is a flat panel or enclosed structure, often baited, that ensnare insects, birds, or other animals with a non-drying adhesive substance. Trapped animals become unable to move, dying a prolonged death by starvation, dehydration, or suffocation. Glue traps are widely used in agricultural and indoor pest monitoring, but criticized as inhumane and indiscriminate, trapping a range of animals in addition to the target species. They are banned or partially banned in England, Iceland, Ireland, New Zealand, Scotland, Norway, and in individual municipalities in the United States.

=== Types of sets ===
The most productive set for foothold traps is a dirt hole, a hole dug in the ground with a trap positioned in front. An attractant is placed inside the hole. The hole for the set is usually made in front of some type of object which is where medium-sized animals such as coyotes, fox or bobcats would use for themselves to store food. This object could be a tuft of taller grass, a stone, a stump, or some other natural object. The dirt from the hole is sifted over the trap and a lure applied around the hole.

A flat set is another common use of the foothold trap. It is very similar to the dirt hole trap set, simply with no hole to dig. The attractant is placed on the object near the trap and a urine scent sprayed to the object.

The cubby set simulates a den in which a small animal would live, but could be adapted for larger game. It could be made from various materials such as rocks, logs or bark, but the back must be closed to control the animals approach. The bait and/or lure is placed in the back of the cubby.

The water set is usually described as a body-gripping trap or snare set so that the trap jaws or snare loop are partially submerged. The conibear is a type of trap used in water trapping and can also be used on land and is heavily regulated. The regulations vary from jurisdiction to jurisdiction. It is normally used without bait and has a wire trigger in the middle of its square-shaped, heavy-gauge wire jaws. It is placed in places that are frequented by the fur bearing animals.

== Unwanted catches ==
Trappers can employ a variety of devices and strategies to avoid unwanted catches. Ideally, if a non-target animal (such as a domestic cat or dog) is caught in a non-lethal trap, it can be released without harm. A careful choice of set and lure may help to catch target animals while avoiding non-target animals. Although trappers cannot always guarantee that unwanted animals will not be caught, they can take precautions to avoid unwanted catches or release them unharmed.

The snaring of non-target animals can be minimized using methods that exclude animals larger or smaller than the target animal. For example, deer stops are designed to avoid the snaring of deer or cattle by the leg; they are required in some parts of the US. Other precautions include setting snares at specific heights, diameters, and locations. In a study of foxes in the UK, researchers were unintentionally snaring brown hares about as frequently as the intended foxes until they improved their methods, using larger wire with rabbit stops to eliminate the unwanted catch of the brown hares.

== Controversy ==
Any type of trap—whether it be a foothold/leghold, conibear, or snare/cable restraint—can get an unwanted catch, including endangered species and pets. Wildlife Services, a branch of the U.S. Department of Agriculture, estimated that between 2003 and 2013 hundreds of pets were killed by body-gripping traps, and that the agency itself has killed thousands of non-target animals in several states, from pet dogs to endangered species. The number of non-target animals killed has caused national and regional animal-protection organizations such as the Humane Society of the United States, American Society for the Prevention of Cruelty to Animals, Massachusetts Society for the Prevention of Cruelty to Animals, and others to continue to lobby for stricter controls over the use of these traps in the United States.

Trapping might lead to stress, pain, or death for the animal, depending on the type of trap. Traps that work by catching limbs can cause injuries on the limbs, especially if used improperly and leave the animal unattended until the trapper comes. The animal might die from the injury, starvation, or attacks from other animals. Many states employ the regulation that a trap must be checked at least every 36 hours to minimize risks to the animals.

Trapping requires time, hard work, and money but can be efficient. Trapping has become expensive for the trapper, and in modern times it has become controversial. In part to address these concerns, in 1996, the Association of Fish and Wildlife Agencies, an organization made up of U.S. state and federal fish and wildlife agency professionals, began testing traps and compiling recommendations "to improve and modernize the technology of trapping through scientific research" known as Best Management Practices. As of February 2013, twenty best management practice recommendations have been published, covering nineteen species of common furbearers across North America.

Trapping in Manitoba, Canada, the average 2019–2020 pelt values for a red squirrel was CA$0.54 and for a black bear was $153.41.

== See also ==
- Animal population control
- Beer trap
- Bird trap
- Bottle trap
- Bushmeat
- Crab trap
- Fish trap
- Fly-killing device
- Game Warden
- Hunting
- Insect collecting
- Lobster trap
- Malaise trap
- Mouse trap
- Ornithology
- Pitfall trap
- Rocket net
- Trap (disambiguation)
- Trapping pit
