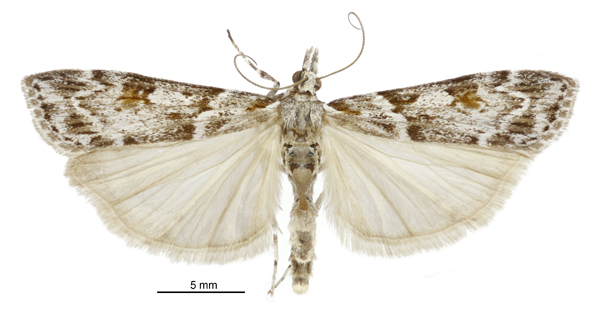
- Male
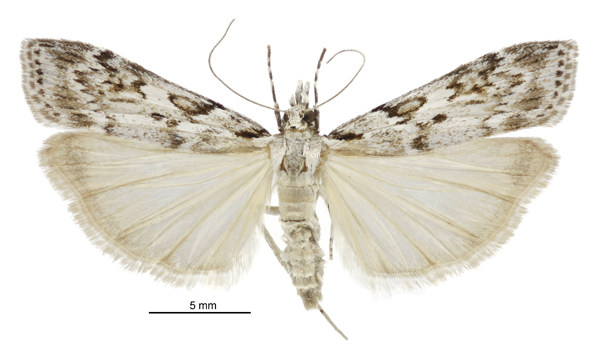
- Female

Scientific classification
- Kingdom: Animalia
- Phylum: Arthropoda
- Clade: Pancrustacea
- Class: Insecta
- Order: Lepidoptera
- Family: Crambidae
- Genus: Scoparia
- Species: S. petrina

Binomial name
- Scoparia petrina (Meyrick, 1884)

Synonyms
- Xeroscopa petrina Meyrick, 1884; Scoparia legionaria Philpott, 1928

= Scoparia petrina =

Species of moth

Scoparia petrina is a species of moth in the family Crambidae. It was named by Edward Meyrick in 1884. Meyrick gave a description of the species in 1885. It is endemic to New Zealand.

The wingspan is 30–31 mm for males and 24 mm for females. The forewings are fuscous-grey or dark grey, irrorated with white. There is a very small dark fuscous triangular spot at the base of the costa. The first line is whitish, posteriorly margined with dark fuscous. The second line is whitish, anteriorly dark-margined and with blackish dots on the veins. The terminal area is somewhat irrorated with white, except for a broad suffused subterminal line. The hindwings are very pale whitish-ochreous with a greyish apex in females. Adults have been recorded on wing in January and February.

This species can be distinguished from others by the absence of black markings on its wings.

Adult are attracted to light and have been collected via a mercury vapour light trap.
