= Pitfall trap =

Trap for small animals

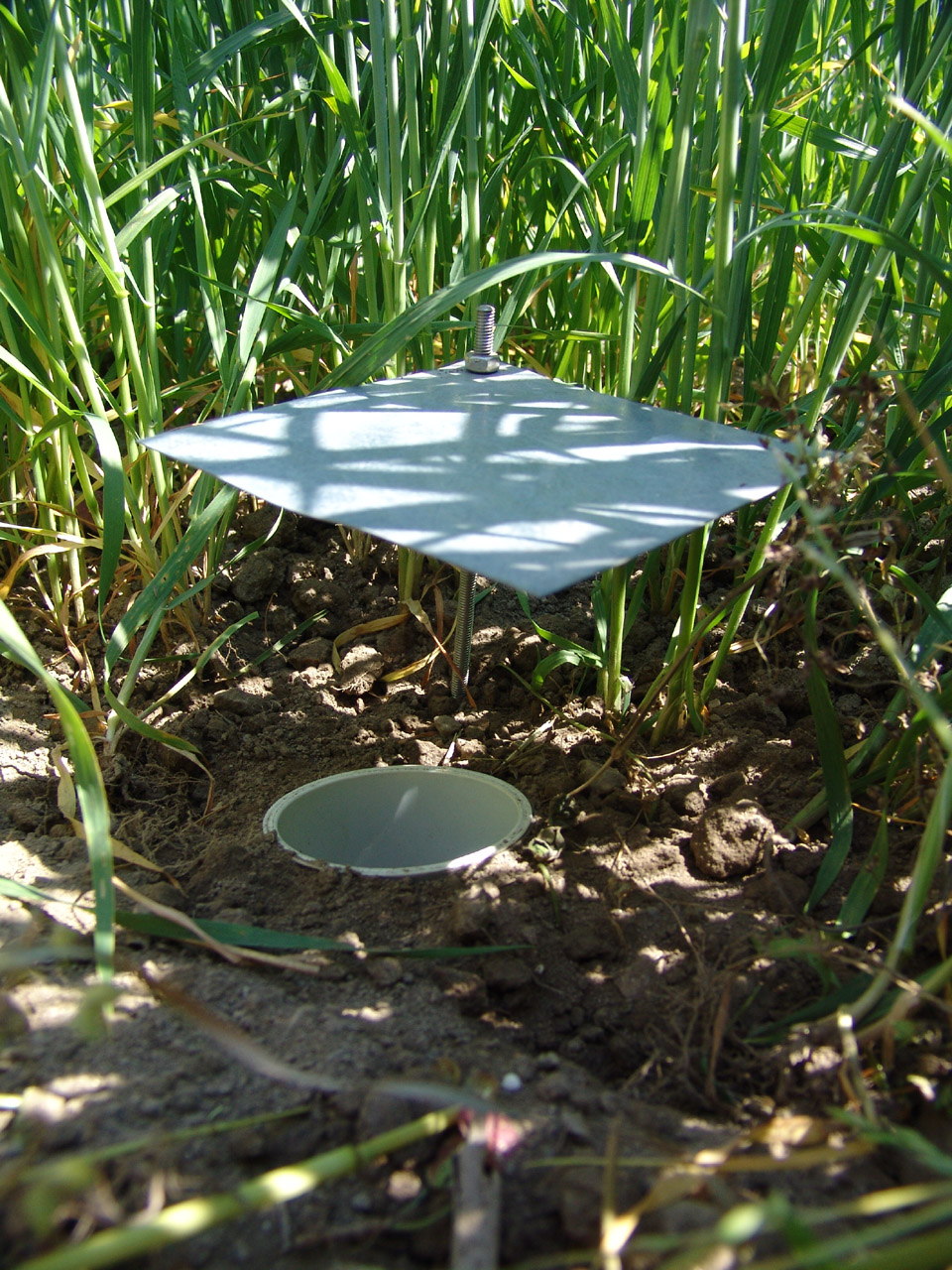
A Barber pitfall trap, designed to catch small epigeic animals, particular arthropods

A pitfall trap is a trapping pit for small animals, such as insects, amphibians and reptiles. Pitfall traps are a sampling technique, mainly used for ecology studies and ecological pest control. Animals that enter a pitfall trap are unable to escape. This is a form of passive collection, as opposed to active collection where the collector catches each animal (by hand or with a device such as a butterfly net).

== Structure and composition ==
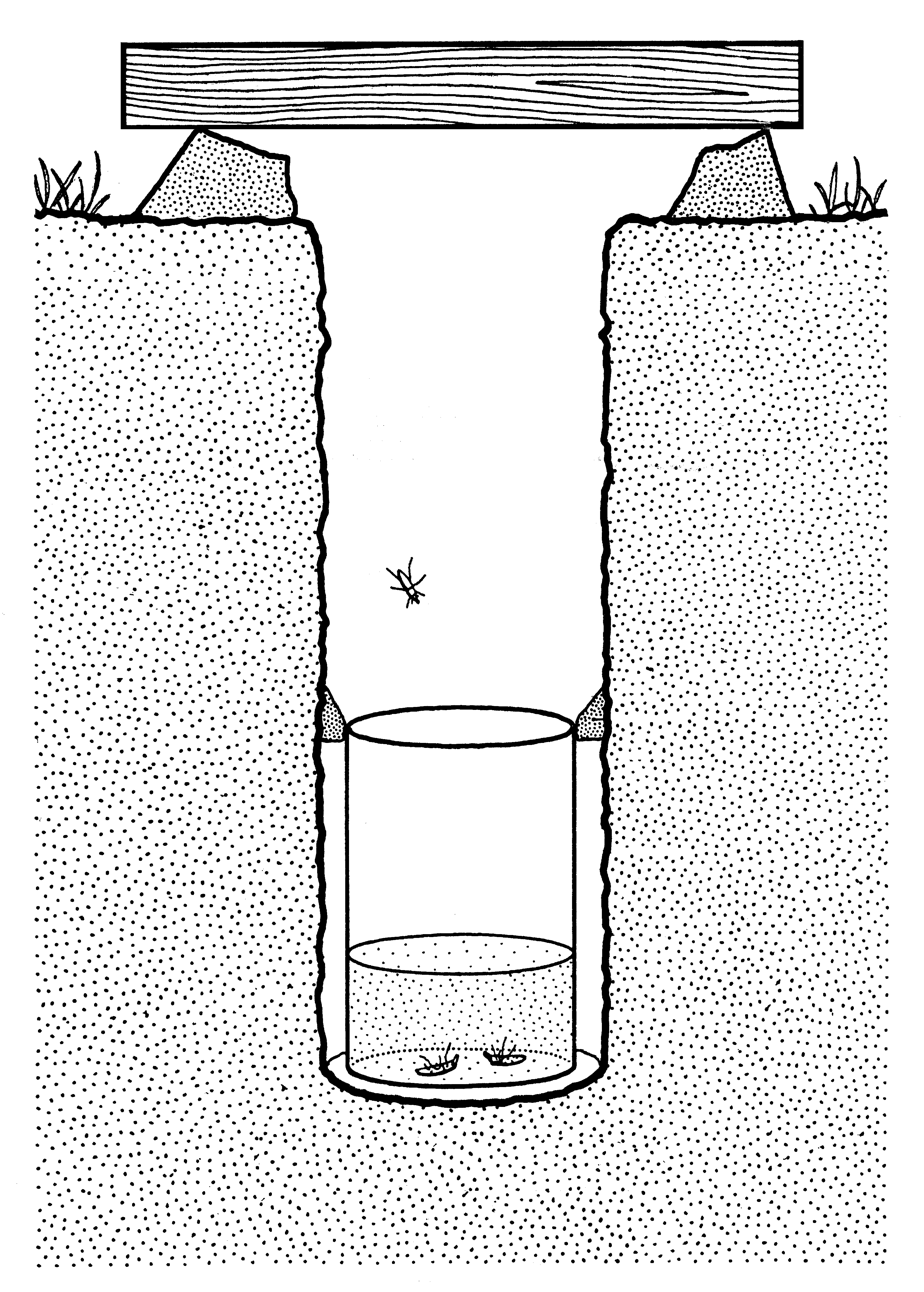
Wet pitfall trap for insects, with its lid raised on stones

Pitfall traps come in a variety of sizes and designs. They come in two main forms: dry and wet pitfall traps. Dry pitfall traps consist of a container (tin, jar or drum) buried in the ground with its rim at surface level used to trap mobile animals that fall into it.

Wet pitfall traps are basically the same, but contain a solution designed to kill and preserve the trapped animals. The fluids that can be used in these traps include formalin (10% formaldehyde), ethanol, ethylene glycol, propylene glycol, acetic acid, chloral hydrate, or even (with daily checked traps) plain water. The choice of preservative is dependent on the study, since different preservatives evaporate at different rates, and are other considerations such as which preservative is better or worse suited to preserve DNA or morphological information. A little detergent is usually added to break the surface tension of the liquid to promote quick drowning.

The opening is sometimes covered by a sloped stone or lid or some other object. This is done to reduce the amount of rain and debris entering the trap, and to prevent animals in dry traps from drowning (when it rains) or overheating (during the day) as well as to keep out predators. Some more complicated designs also include a vertebrate exclusion fence between the rain-guard and the edge of the trap to prevent bycatch of vertebrates such as lizards.

Traps may also be baited. Lures or baits of varying specificity can be used to increase the capture rate of a certain target species or group by placing them in, above or near the trap. Examples of baits include meat, dung, fruit and pheromones.

Some designs include fence-lines sometimes called guidance barriers or drift-fences which are small fences that funnel the target organisms toward the trap, resulting in a significantly higher species richness compared with designs without.

Disturbing the soil in an area can have an effect on the activity of ground dwelling arthropods in an area, so sometimes a rim-plate is attached to the trap container which allows the trap to be swapped out easier and avoids the effects of disturbing the soil.

== Uses ==
Pitfall traps can be used for various purposes:

- As a way to collect endangered species for translocation out of areas that are being disturbed by human activities such as urban expansion or environmental remediation.
- Collectors and researchers of various ground-dwelling animal species may use pitfall traps to collect the animals they are interested in. This can be done without bait (for example ground beetles and spiders) or with bait (for example Gecko). Pitfall traps are one of the most commonly used arthropod sampling methods due to their simple construction.
- When used in series, these traps may also be used to estimate species richness (number of species present) and to estimate activity-density, and this combined information may be used to calculate biodiversity indices.

== Disadvantages ==
There are inevitably biases in pitfall sampling when it comes to comparison of different groups of animals and different habitats in which the trapping occurs. An animal's trappability depends on the structure of its habitat (e.g. density of vegetation, type of substrate). Gullan and Cranston (2005) recommend measuring and controlling for such variations.

Intrinsic properties of the animal itself also affect its trappability: some taxa are more active than others (e.g. higher physiological activity or ranging over a wider area), more trap avoidant, less likely to be found on the ground (e.g. tree-dwelling species that occasionally move across the terrain), or too large to be trapped (or large enough to escape if trapped). Trappability can also be affected by conditions such as temperature or rain, which may alter the animal's behaviour.

The capture rate is therefore influenced not only to how abundant a given type of animal is (which is often the factor of interest), but how easily they are trapped. Comparisons between different groups must therefore take into account variation in habitat structure and complexity, changes in ecological conditions over time and the innate differences in species.

Pitfall trap design itself has a significant impact on the taxa present in the sample, and these effects are also taxon dependant. Trap size, material, preservative, and the presence of drift-fences all have their own effects on the taxa caught in the trap.

This is in addition to the effects of disturbing the soil and surrounding environment when installing the trap, along with the length of time that the traps are placed in the environment for and the number of traps used. This trap and study design varies widely in the literature, either because different researchers simply have personal preferences, or to fit more specific research questions. This makes standardising the catch between studies for meta-analysis difficult.

A key consideration of study-design using pitfall traps is that the resulting catch is a measure of activity-density, rather than a true density value. Unfortunately the variability caused by factors such differences between taxa, density-dependant activity, and temperature differences, makes it difficult for ecologists to calculate a true density from the count of the trapped organisms.

== See also ==
- Insect collecting
- Malaise trap
- Flight interception trap
- Bottle trap
- Quadrat
- Bug zapper
