= Bottle trap =

Trap for catching insects

A bottle trap is a type of baited arboreal insect trap for collecting either prized or harmful frugivorous beetles, especially flower beetles, leaf chafers and longhorn beetles as well as wasps and other unwanted flying insects.

== Structure ==
A bottle trap is an insect trap made out of a plastic bottle. Most collectors use bottles of 1.5 or 2 liters to make these traps but smaller bottles are sometimes used as well. There are basically two types:

=== Funnel type ===
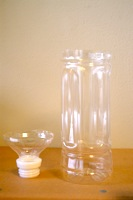
A plastic bottle with its neck cut off, to make a bottle trap

These bottle traps are made by cutting off the neck of the bottle as well as the complete tapering part of the top. The neck and cap are discarded. For catching wasps only the cap is removed, while leaving the neck in place. The tapering part is placed upside down on top of the rest of the bottle, thereby effectively forming a funnel. This funnel is then fixed to the bottle by piercing both bottle and funnel at two opposing sides. A wire fitted through these holes ensures the funnel solidly fits on the bottle, while the trap can easily be opened when required. After putting the bait in the bottle the trap is placed at the desired location.

Advantages:

- Insects can't escape from this type of trap, since they fly up along the side of the bottle, not finding the exit, which is in the middle.
- Bats and large moths can't enter the trap, since they are too large to fit through the funnel.
- Unlike a side-door trap, can be used to catch wasps

Disadvantages:

- Not only insects but also rain will funnel into the trap. This trap is therefore normally only used in dry seasons.
- This construction requires a bit more work than the side door type.

=== Side-door type ===
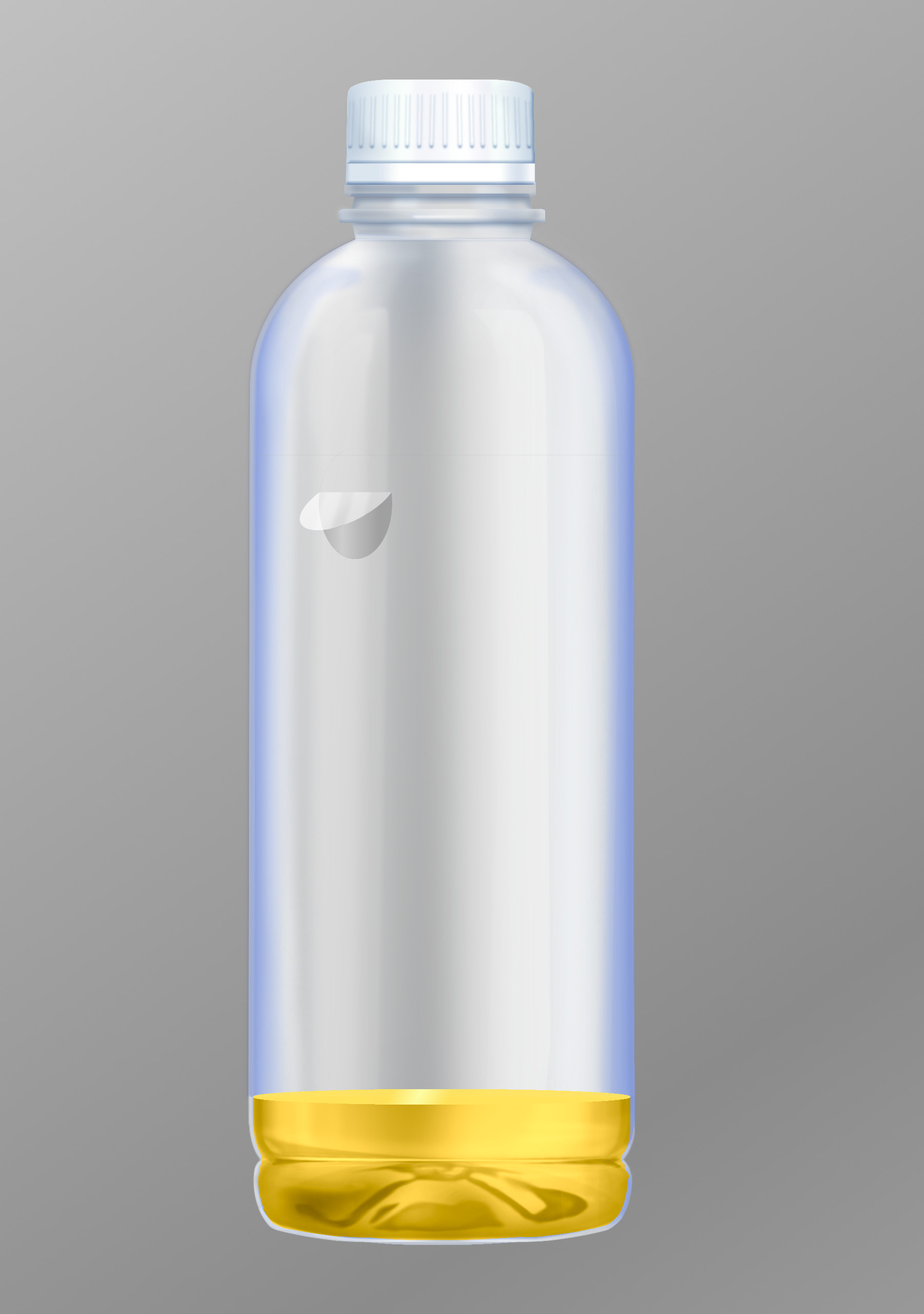
A side-door bottle trap, with a small opening

A side-door bottle trap consists of a capped plastic bottle with a "door" cut into one side, near the top. A simple curve or rectangle shape is cut out, taking care that it stays attached to the bottle on its upside. This plastic flap is then bent upward, effectively forming a rain shield over the entrance. The size of the "door" depends on the type of insects the user intends to trap. After adding some bait the trap is put in its place.

Advantages:

- Because of its opening with rain shield very little rain enters the trap, making it effective in wet seasons too.
- Construction is very simple and requires no additional materials.

Disadvantages:

- When a larger opening is cut, small bats and large moths may also enter. These may die in the trap and pollute it, as well as forming, with their wings, a bridge to the exit.
- Captured beetles may escape again since they may simply fly upward along the side of the bottle.

== Bait ==
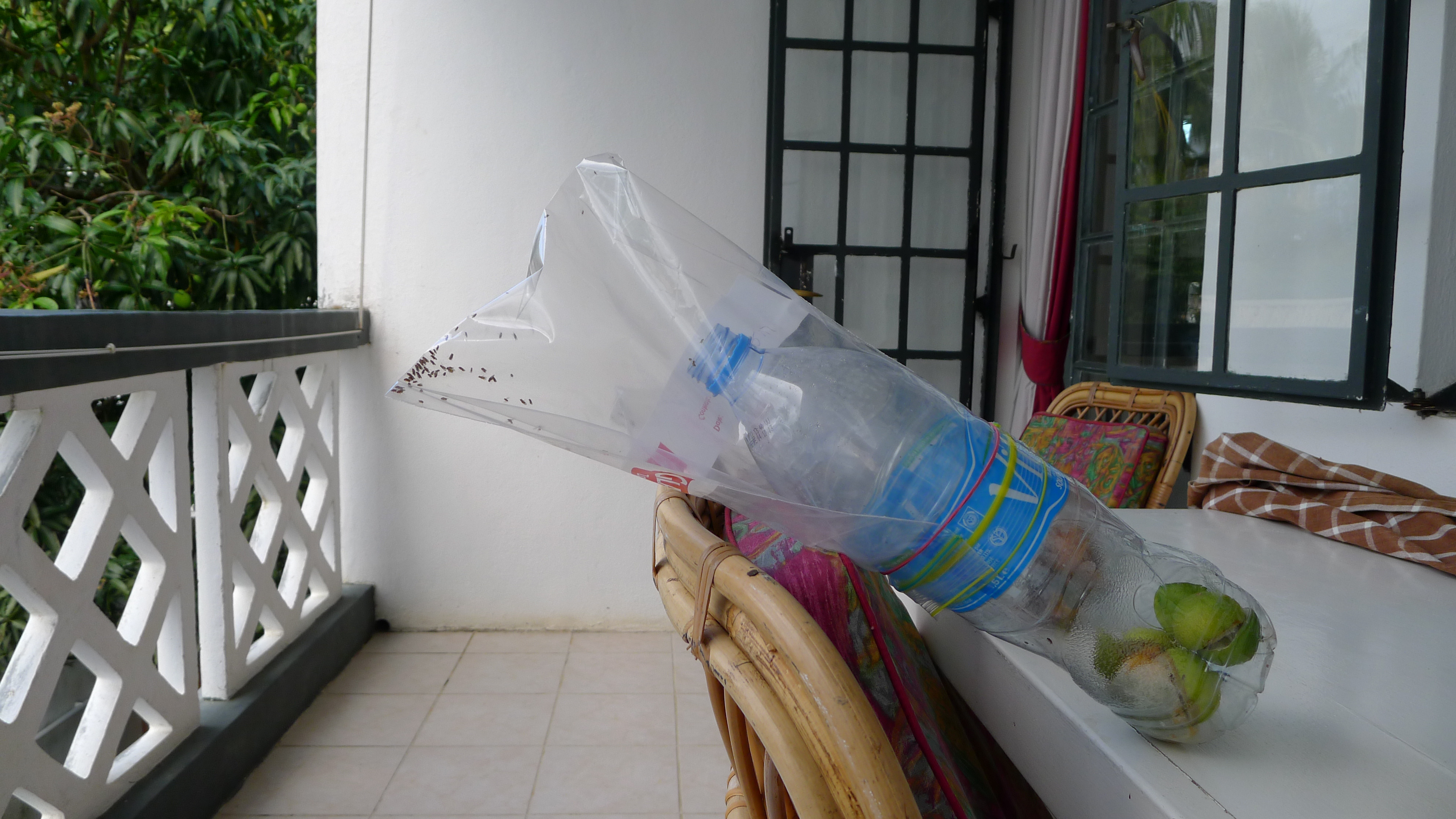
Fruit flies in a trap baited with lemons and limes

Many different types of bait are used. Since this kind of trap is mainly used for beetles that are attracted to (over)ripe fruits, baits with a certain amount of alcohol are usually very effective.

Beetles are commonly baited with banana, optionally with beer, rum and/or sugar, and can also be attracted with a mixture of red wine, vinegar and sugar. Wasps can be drawn into a funnel type bottle trap using syrup, a soft drink or sugar water. Bread soaked with beer will attract cockroaches.

Other fruits are sometimes used, but banana is most common used since it is widely available, normally inexpensive and contains sufficient sugar to start a fermentation process by itself. The different ingredients are usually kept apart and mixed in the trap itself, but some collectors prefer to mix their bait before going into the field.

== Placement ==
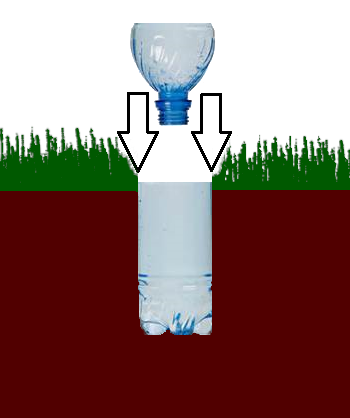
Plastic bottle trap sunk into the ground as a pitfall trap

Bottle traps (like all traps) yield best in places where more of the desired insects are to be expected. For beetles, in general this means high up in trees, especially flowering or fruiting trees. Other places in which traps are often placed with good results include forest borders. Traps placed inside forests usually yield smaller numbers of beetles, but also different species. Traps for luring wasps are usually set up a short distance (several meters) from the place where they are bothersome.

There are various methods used for placing bottle traps:

- After a hole is made in the top of the trap, a branch is bent down and its top fitted through the hole.
- A thin cord is attached to the trap, after which the cord is thrown over a high branch and the trap pulled up, the rope then being fixed to some lower branch.
- After a wire hook is fixed to it, the trap is either manually or with the aid of a long stick hung over a branch.
- The trap is placed on the ground.

The first three methods are used most often for collecting beetles, while the latter two are more commonly in use for catching wasps.

== Bycatch ==
Next to the desired beetles, many other insects may find the bait attractive. Sap beetles (a group of small fruit-eating beetles), moths like the large white witch moth, various butterflies, cockroaches, flies, stingless bees, wasps and even small fruit eating bats may enter the bottle traps as bycatch while the collector aims for beetles. Such unwanted animals in the trap may cause the collector several problems:

- These unwanted insects pollute the trap. Because they cannot escape the trap, they will, like the beetles, eventually die in it. Fragile insects such as moths and butterflies will live only for a short time in these traps, and after they die their bodies will quickly start rotting, and their intestines as well as the scales on their wings will pollute the bait. Although this will not necessarily alter the attractiveness of the bait to other insects, the remains of the unwanted specimen will make it more difficult for the collector to check the bait for desired beetles. Unwanted animals which are still alive usually need some time to get over the effects of alcohol, after which they will fly away.
- They may create an escape route for trapped beetles. Especially the very long wings of the neotropical white witch moth may form an effective bridge from the bait to the opening of the trap.
- Protected species such as bats may enter the trap and not be able to leave it again. When they are still alive, bats are often able to fly away directly after being flushed with clean water.

== See also ==
- Entomology
- Insect collecting
- Pitfall trap
- Malaise trap
- Flight Interception Trap (FIT)
