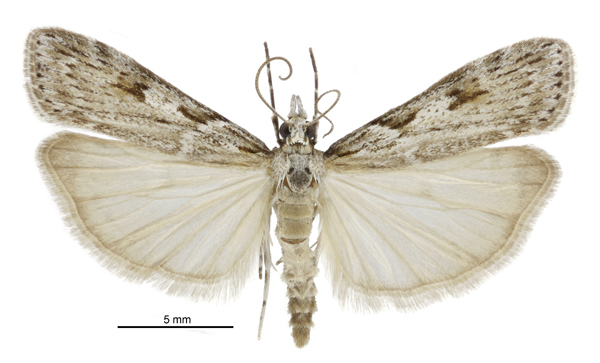
- Male
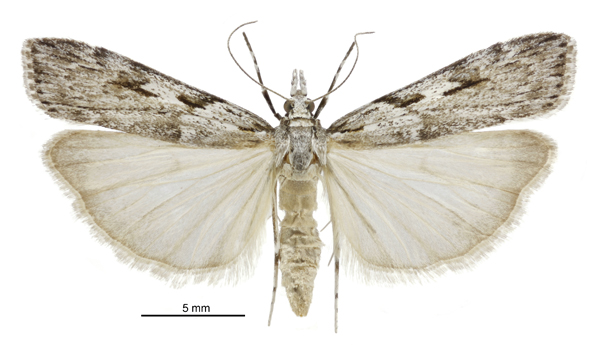
- Female

Scientific classification
- Kingdom: Animalia
- Phylum: Arthropoda
- Clade: Pancrustacea
- Class: Insecta
- Order: Lepidoptera
- Family: Crambidae
- Genus: Scoparia
- Species: S. halopis

Binomial name
- Scoparia halopis Meyrick, 1909

= Scoparia halopis =

Species of moth

Scoparia halopis is a moth in the family Crambidae. It was described by Edward Meyrick in 1909. It is endemic to New Zealand, where it has been recorded as far south as the Auckland Islands.

New Zealand lepidopterist Brian Patrick notes that "when I was young growing up in Invercargill, I reared an adult from larvae found in soil - so probably a sod webworm by lifestyle." According to Patrick, this species is "common and widely distributed from sub-Antarctic northwards in both natural and suburban settings" in New Zealand.

Adults are attracted to light and have been collected via a mercury vapour light trap.
