= Insecticidal soap =

Spray used to kill plant pests

Soap has been used for more than 200 years as an insect control. Because insecticidal soap works on direct contact with pests via the disruption of cell membranes when the insect is penetrated with fatty acids, the insect's cells leak their contents causing the insect to dehydrate and die. Insecticidal soap is sprayed on plants until the entire plant is saturated because the insecticidal properties of the soap occurs when the solution is wet. Soaps have a low mammalian toxicity and are therefore considered safe to be used around children and pets, and may be used in organic farming.

== Composition ==
Insecticidal soap's active ingredient is most often a potassium salt of fatty acids. Insecticidal soap should be based on long-chain fatty acids (10–18 carbon atoms) because shorter-chain fatty acids tend to be damaging for the plant (phytotoxicity). Short (8-carbon) fatty-acid chains occur for example in coconut oil and soaps based thereon. "'Green Soap' is a potassium/coconut oil soap .... [that] has also been shown to be effective, as an unlabeled insecticide, in controlling soft-bodied insects including aphids". Recommended concentrations of insecticidal soap are typically in the range 1–2 percent soap mixed with water. One manufacturer recommends a concentration of 0.06% to 0.25% (pure soap equivalent) for most agricultural applications.; another one recommends concentrations of 0.5 to 1% pure soap equivalent. In the European Union, fatty acid potassium salts are registered and allowed as insecticide at a 2% concentration.

Insecticidal soap is most effective if it is dissolved in soft water, since the fatty acids in soap tend to precipitate in hard water, thereby reducing the effectivity.

Insecticidal soap is sold commercially for aphid control. Labels on these products may not always use the word soap, but they will list "potassium salts of fatty acids" or "potassium laurate" as the active ingredient. Certain types of household soaps (not synthetic detergents, ) are also suitable, but it may be difficult to tell the composition and water content from the label. Potassium-based soaps are typically soft or liquid.

== Mechanism of action ==
The mechanism of action is not exactly understood. Possible mechanisms are:

- Soap, which enters via the insect's trachea, may disrupt cell membranes, resulting in the cell contents leaking from the damaged cells (cytolysis).
- Dissolving the wax layer on the cuticle ("skin"), which leads to water loss by evaporation.
- Blocking breathing openings or trachea, which leads to suffocation.
- Interfering with growth hormones.
- Affecting insect metabolism.

== Affected organisms ==
Insecticidal soap works best on soft-bodied insects and other arthropods such as aphids, adelgids, mealybugs, spider mites, thrips, jumping plant lice, scale insects, whiteflies, and sawfly larvae. It can also be used for caterpillars and leafhoppers, but these large-bodied insects can be more difficult to control with soaps alone. Many pollinators and predatory insects such as lady beetles, bumblebees, and hoverflies are relatively unaffected. However, soap will kill predatory mites that may help control spider mites. Also, the soft-bodied aphid-eating larvae of lady beetles, lacewing, and hoverflies may be affected negatively. According to one study a single soap application killed about 15% of lacewing and lady-beetle larvae, and about 65% of predatory mites (Amblyseius andersoni).

Green peach aphids are difficult to control since they reproduce quickly (one adult female can deposit up to four nymphs per day) because they tend to reside under the leaves and in leaf axils ("leaf armpits"), where they may not be wetted by a soap spray. Manufacturers indeed state that their insecticidal soaps are only suitable for controlling green peach aphids if used in combination with another insecticide, whereas the same soaps can control other aphids on their own. Among green peach aphids that are in contact with a 2% soap solution, around 95% of the adults and 98% of nymphs die within 48 hours. At 0.75% concentration, the mortality rates are reduced to 75% and 90%, respectively.

Since 2011, insecticidal soap has also been approved in the United States for use against powdery mildew. In the European pesticide registration, its use as an insecticide is listed for aphids, white fly, and spider mites. It may not be used against algae and moss.

== Use ==
Insecticidal soap solution will only kill pests on contact; it has no residual action against aphids that arrive after it has dried. Therefore, the infested plants must be thoroughly wetted. Repeated applications may be necessary to adequately control high populations of pests.

Soap spray may damage plants, especially at higher concentrations or at temperatures above 32 °C (90 °F). Plant injury may not be apparent until two days after application. Some plant species are particularly sensitive to soap sprays. Highly sensitive plants include: horse chestnut, Japanese maple (Acer), Sorbus aucuparia (mountain ash), cherimoya fruit, Lamprocapnos (bleeding heart), and sweet pea. Other sensitive plants include: Portulaca, some tomato varieties, Crataegus (hawthorn), cherries, plum, Adiantum (maidenhair fern), Euphorbia milii (crown of thorns), Lantana camara, Tropaeolum (nasturtium), Gardenia jasminoides, Lilium longiflorum (Easter lily). Conifers under (drought) stress or with tender new growth are sensitive as well.

Damage may occur as yellow or brown spotting on the leaves, burned tips, or leaf scorch. Plants under drought stress, young transplants, unrooted cuttings and plants with soft young growth tend to be more sensitive. Sensitivity may be tested on a small portion of a plant or plot before a full-scale application.

One manufacturer recommends that applications are done with 7- to 14-day intervals, with a maximum of three applications, as repeated applications may aggravate phytotoxicity. In addition, water conditioning agents can increase phytotoxicity.

Thanks to its low mammalian toxicity, application of insecticidal soap is typically allowed up to the day of harvest.

== See also ==
- Biological pest control
- Green pesticide
- Insect trap
- List of beneficial weeds
- List of pest-repelling plants
- Organic farming
