= Insect trap =

Device used to monitor or reduce insect populations

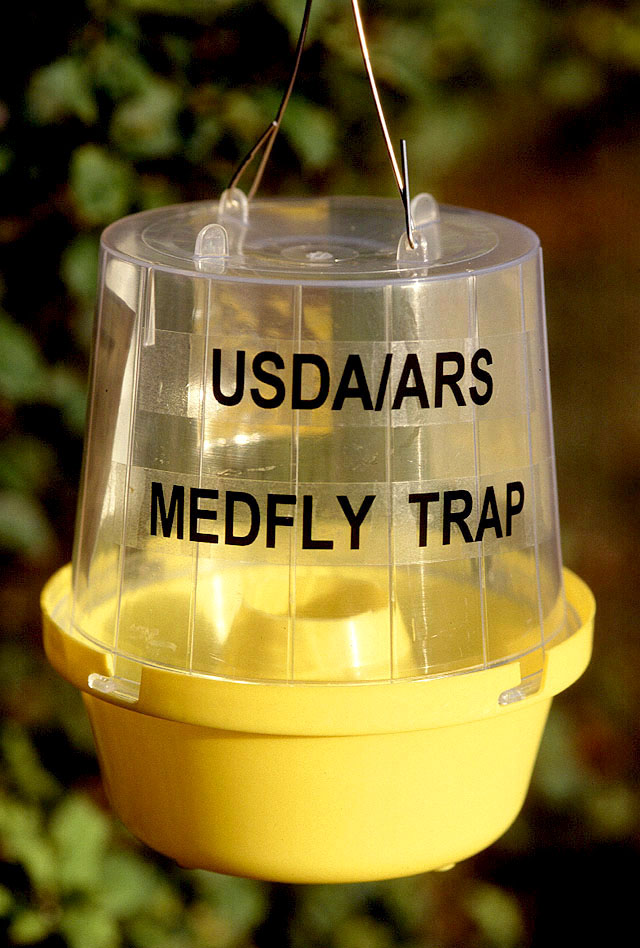
A hanging bucket trap for the Mediterranean fruit fly

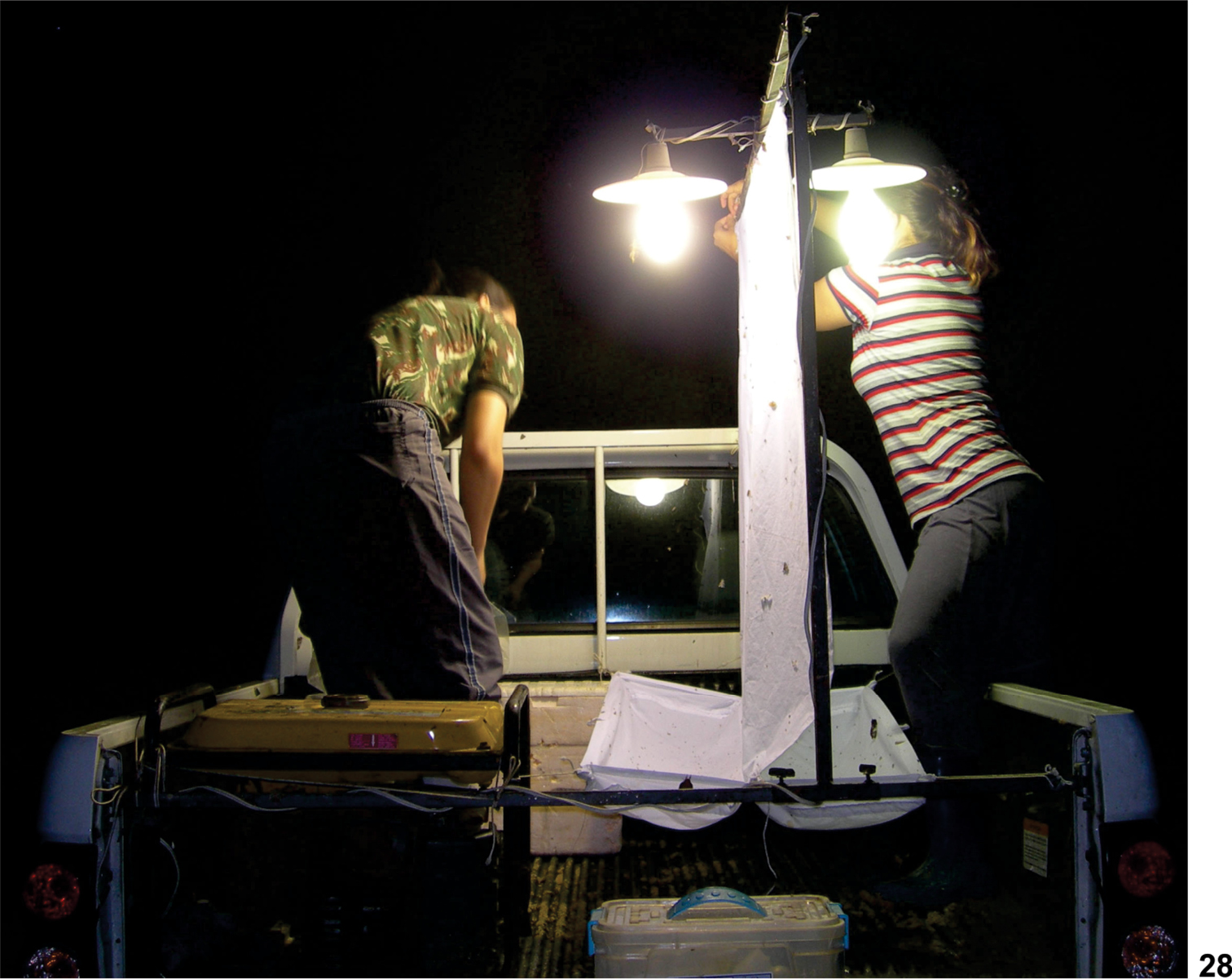
An insect trap mounted onto a pickup truck, for collection of nocturnal species.

Insect traps are used to monitor or directly reduce populations of insects or other arthropods, by trapping individuals and killing them. They typically use food, visual lures, chemical attractants and pheromones as bait and are installed so that they do not injure other animals or humans or result in residues in foods or feeds. Visual lures use light, bright colors and shapes to attract pests. Chemical attractants or pheromones may attract only a specific sex. Insect traps are sometimes used in pest management programs instead of pesticides but are more often used to look at seasonal and distributional patterns of pest occurrence. This information may then be used in other pest management approaches.

The trap mechanism or bait can vary widely. Flies and wasps are attracted by proteins. Mosquitoes and many other insects are attracted by bright colors, carbon dioxide, lactic acid, floral or fruity fragrances, warmth, moisture and pheromones. Synthetic attractants like methyl eugenol are very effective with tephritid flies.

== Trap types ==
Insect traps vary widely in shape, size, and construction, often reflecting the behavior or ecology of the target species. Some common varieties are described below

=== Light traps ===
Light traps, with or without ultraviolet light, work by exploiting the natural tendency of certain insects to be attracted to light. Light sources may include fluorescent lamps, mercury-vapor lamps, black lights, or light-emitting diodes. Designs differ according to the behavior of the insects being targeted.

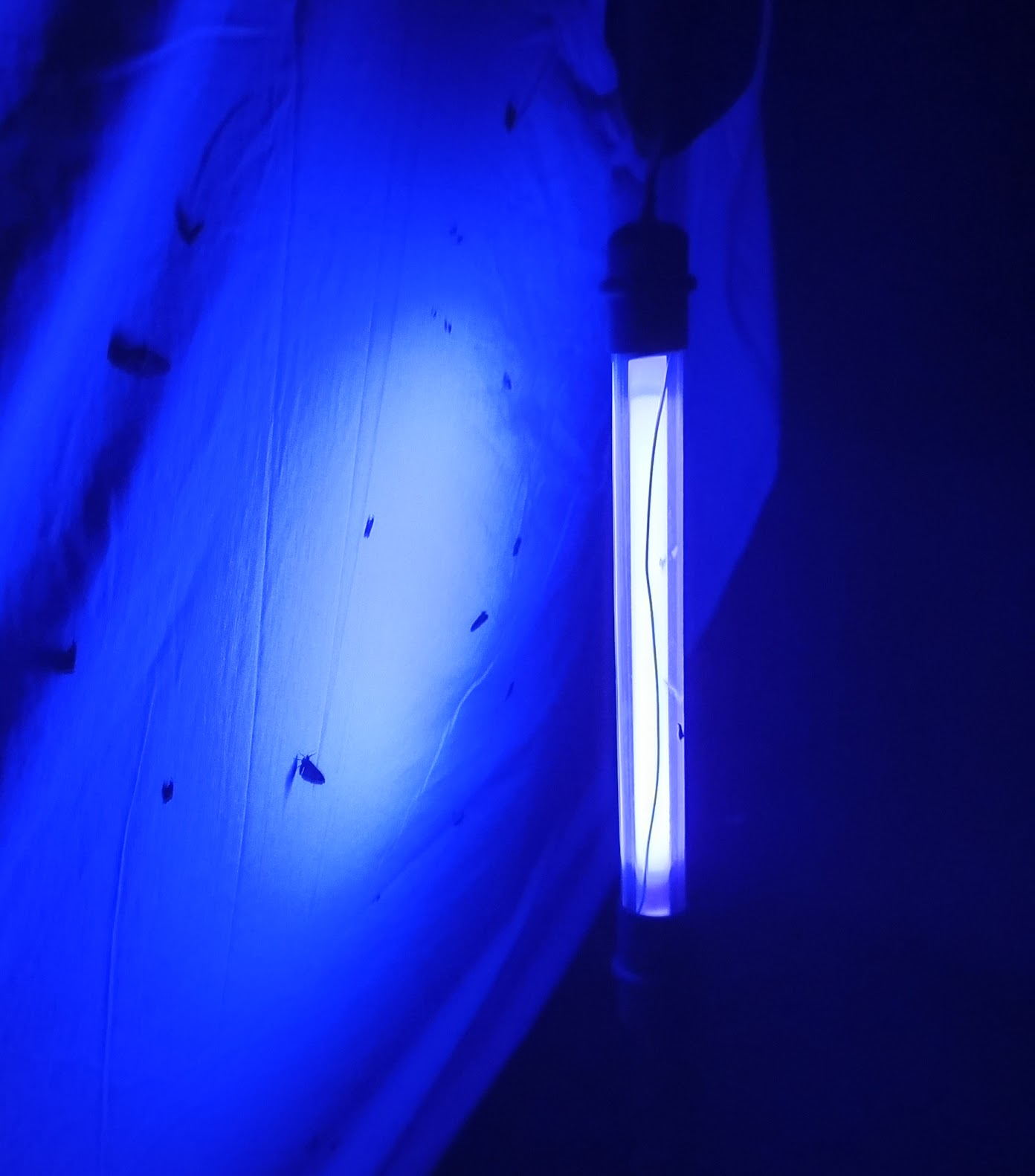
A simple light-trapping set-up consisting of a light source and sheet, used to attract and actively survey nocturnal insects.

Light trapping can be broadly grouped into two categories: active and passive. Active trapping involves setting up a light source and a sheet for insects to land on. The trap is monitored and observations are recorded, but the insects are not confined. Passive trapping uses a light source combined with a trap. The trap may be designed to kill the captured insects or to temporarily confine them for later release. Passive light traps can be further categorised into box type and funnel type.

Light traps are widely used to survey nocturnal moths. Total species richness and abundance of trapped moths may be influenced by several factors such as night temperature, humidity and lamp type.

Grasshoppers and some beetles are attracted to lights at a long range but are repelled by it at short range. Farrow's light trap has a large base so that it captures insects that may otherwise fly away from regular light traps. Light traps can attract flying, aquatic and terrestrial insects, and lights may be combined with other methods described below.

=== Adhesive traps ===
Sticky traps may be simple flat panels or enclosed structures, often baited, that ensnare insects with an adhesive substance. Baitless ones are nicknamed "blunder" traps, as pests might blunder into them while wandering or exploring.

Sticky traps are widely used in agricultural and indoor pest monitoring. Shelter traps, or artificial cover traps, take advantage of an insect's tendencies to seek shelter in loose bark, crevices, or other sheltered places. Baited shelter traps such "Roach Motels" and similar enclosures often have adhesive material inside to trap insects.

=== Flying insect traps ===
These traps are designed to catch flying or wind-blown insects.

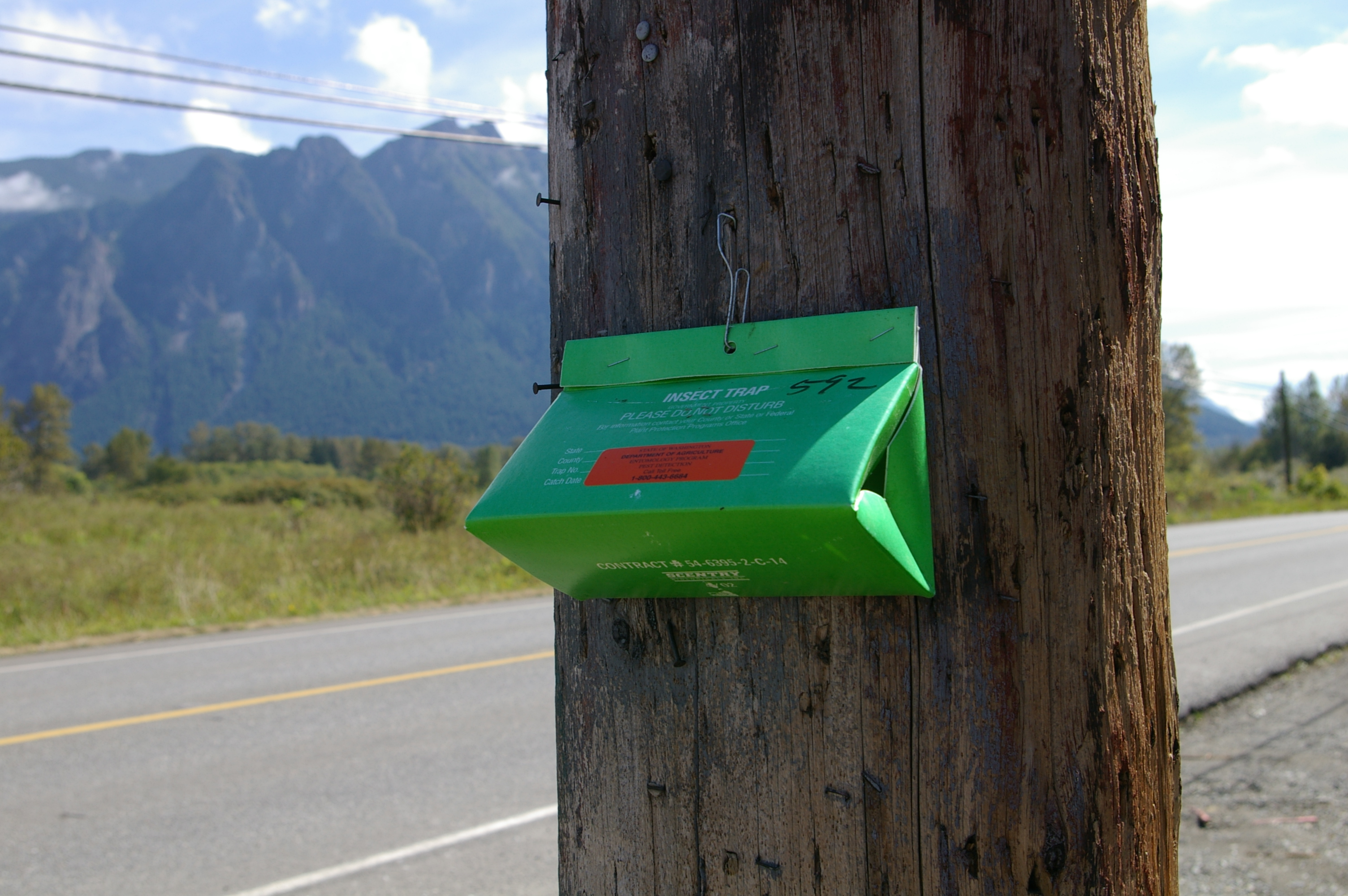
A sticky insect trap used to monitor pest populations

Flight interception traps are net-like or transparent structures (such as old windowpanes in the "window trap" subtype) that impede or stun flying insects and funnel them into collecting containers. Barrier traps consist of a simple vertical sheet or wall that channels insects down into collection containers. The Malaise trap, a more complex type, is a mesh tent-like trap that captures insects that tend to fly up rather than down when impeded.

Pan traps (also called water pan traps) are simple shallow dishes filled with a soapy water or a preservative and killing agent such as antifreeze. Pan traps are used to monitor aphids, wasps, and some other small insects. Pan traps are often yellow, but different colors including blue, white, red, and clear can be used to target different species.

Bucket traps and bottle traps, often supplemented with a funnel, are inexpensive versions that use a bait or attractant to lure insects into a bucket or bottle filled with soapy water or antifreeze. Many types of moth traps are bucket-type traps. Bottle traps are widely used, often used to sample wasp or pest beetle populations. McPhail traps are an invaginated glass flask baited with Torula yeast and borax. The traps are hung in tree canopies where the slurry drowns the flies.

=== Terrestrial arthropod traps ===
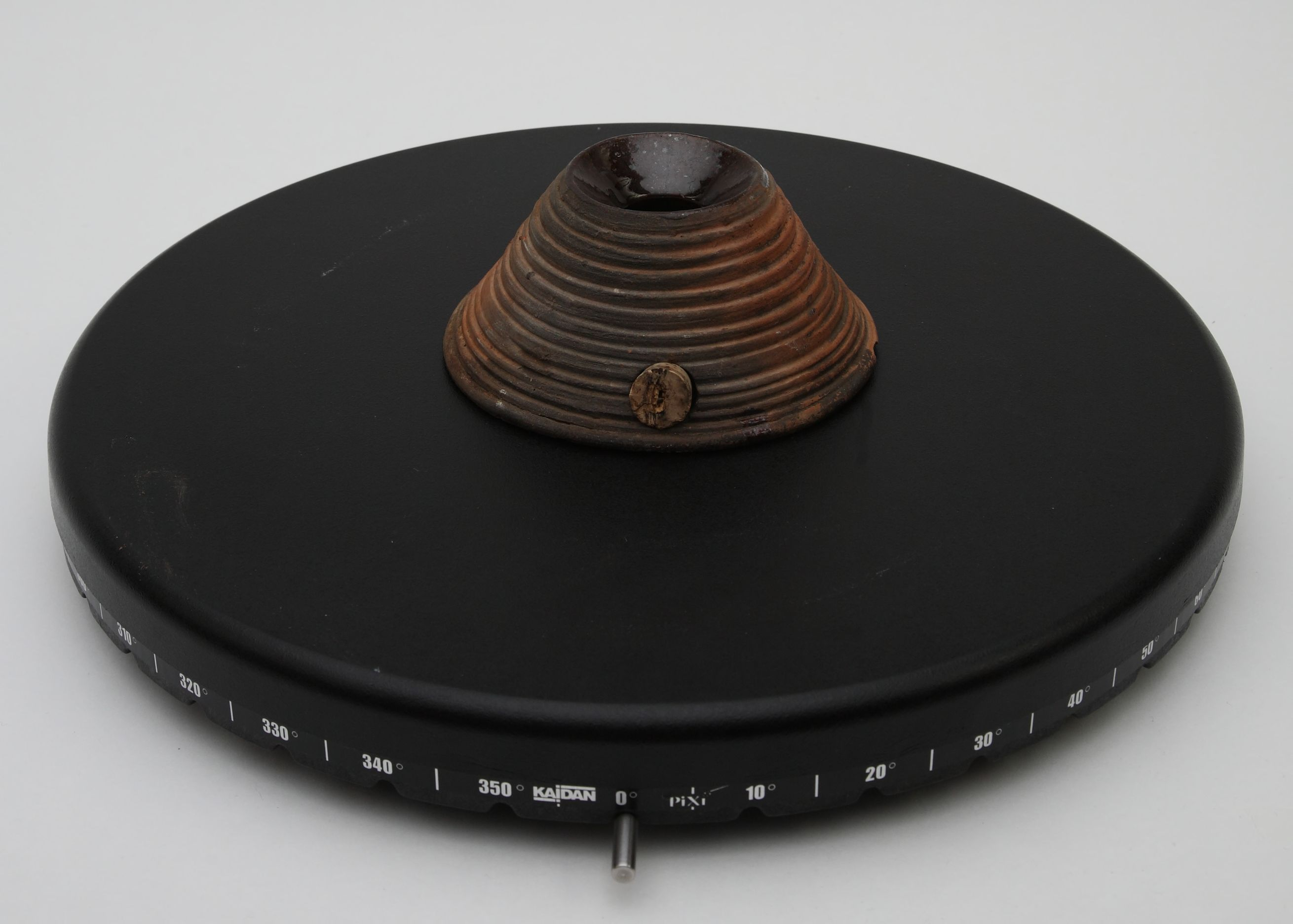
Conical roach trap on platform

Pitfall traps are used for ground-foraging and flightless arthropods such as Carabid beetles and spiders. Pitfall traps consist of a bucket or container buried in soil or other substrate so that its lip is flush with the substrate.

A grain probe is a type of trap used to monitor pests of stored grain, consisting of a long cylindrical tube with multiple holes along its length that can be inserted at various depths within grain.

Soil emergence traps, consisting of an inverted cone or funnel with collecting jar on top, are employed to capture insects with a subterranean pupal stage. Emergence traps have been used to monitor important disease-vectors such as Phlebotomine sandflies.

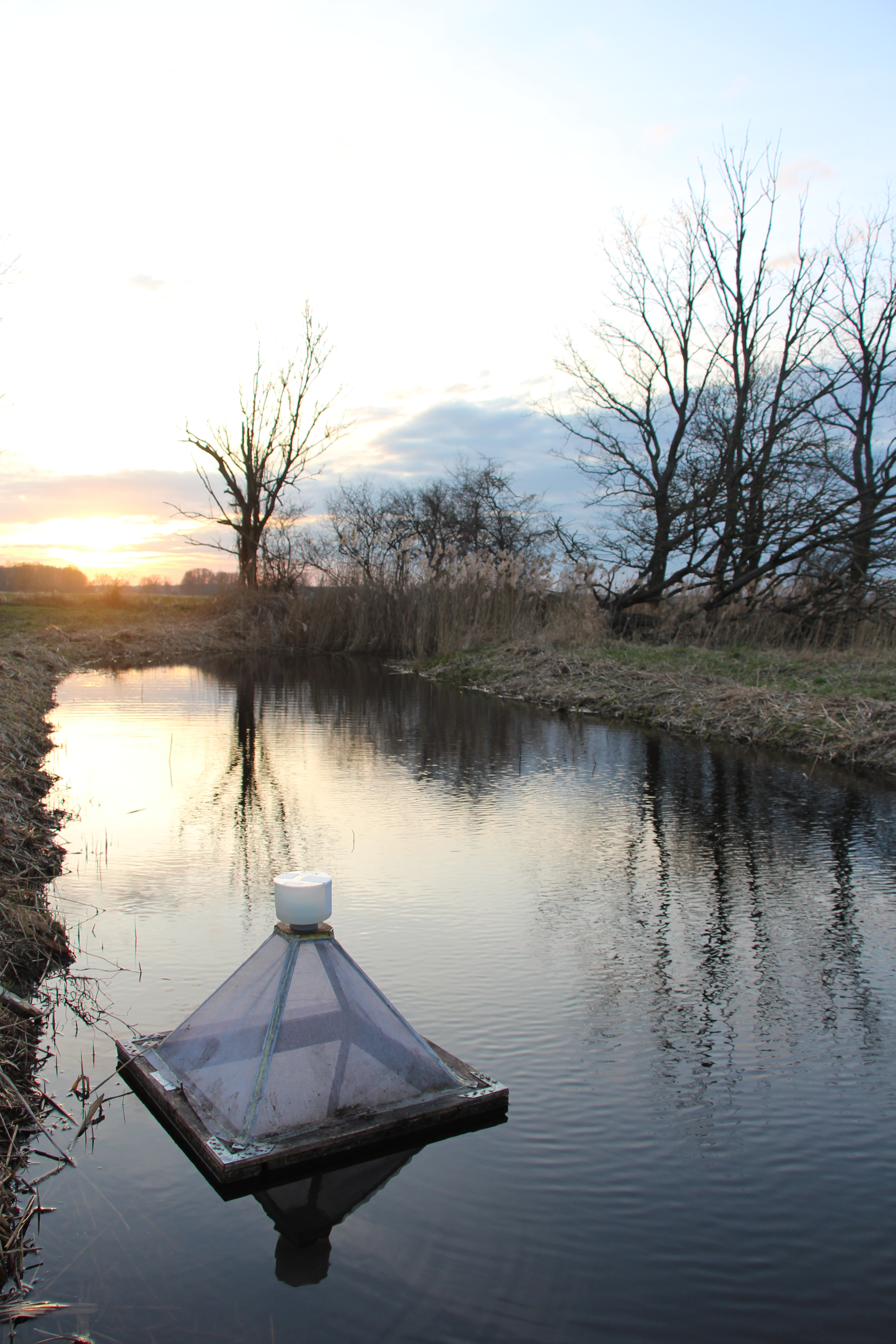
Aquatic emergence trap

=== Aquatic arthropod traps ===
Aquatic interception traps typically involve mesh funnels or conical structures that guide insects into a jar or bottle for collecting.

Aquatic emergence traps are cage-like or tent-like structures used to capture aquatic insects such as chironomids, caddisflies, mosquitoes, and odonates upon their transition from aquatic nymphs or pupae to terrestrial adults. Aquatic emergence traps may be free floating on the water's surface, submerged, or attached to a post near shore.

== See also ==
- Insect collecting
- Integrated pest management
- Biological pest control
- Insecticidal soap
- Organic farming
