= Pan trap =

Insect trap type

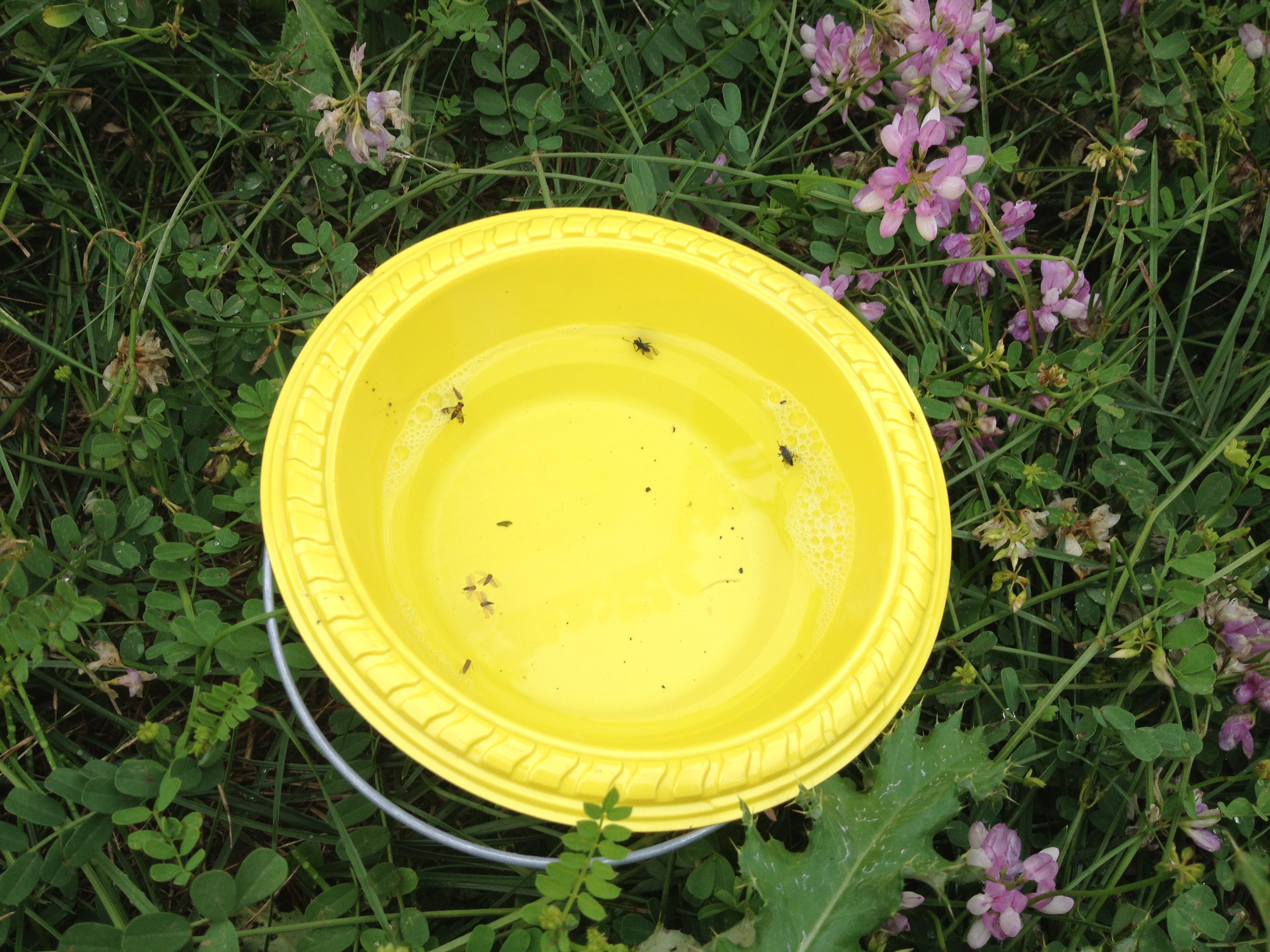
A pan trap with a number of insects having been attracted to it

A pan trap is a type of insect trap used to sample the abundance and diversity of insects, primarily used to capture small Hymenoptera. Pan traps are typically constructed with a bowl with shallow sides filled with water and soap or a preservative and killing agent. Yellow is the most commonly used color, but other colors including blue, white, and red are used to target different insect species. Pan traps are an efficient, cost effective and simple to use trap when targeting Hymenoptera or similar pollinators

== Trap construction ==
A pan trap consists of a shallow bowl, typically made of colored plastic, filled with water and a surfactant such as dishwashing liquid, salt, propylene glycol, antifreeze, or combinations of other preservatives and killing agents. The surfactant lowers the surface tension of the water, causing the insect to sink and eventually drown. Salt and propylene glycol are sometimes included as preservatives or to reduce evaporative water loss. Even with these additions, enough liquid needs to be added to prevent the trap from drying out, but too much liquid will cause the trap to overflow if it rains. Small traps dry out quicker, so longer surveys tend to use traps with a larger volume. Traps may be attached to a stake or weighed down with a rock to prevent movement by the wind or animals. The stake can also serve to raise the trap off the ground. Some traps have been mounted on trees to sample the communities of parasitoid wasps of the invasive beetle, Emerald ash borer.

== Colors ==
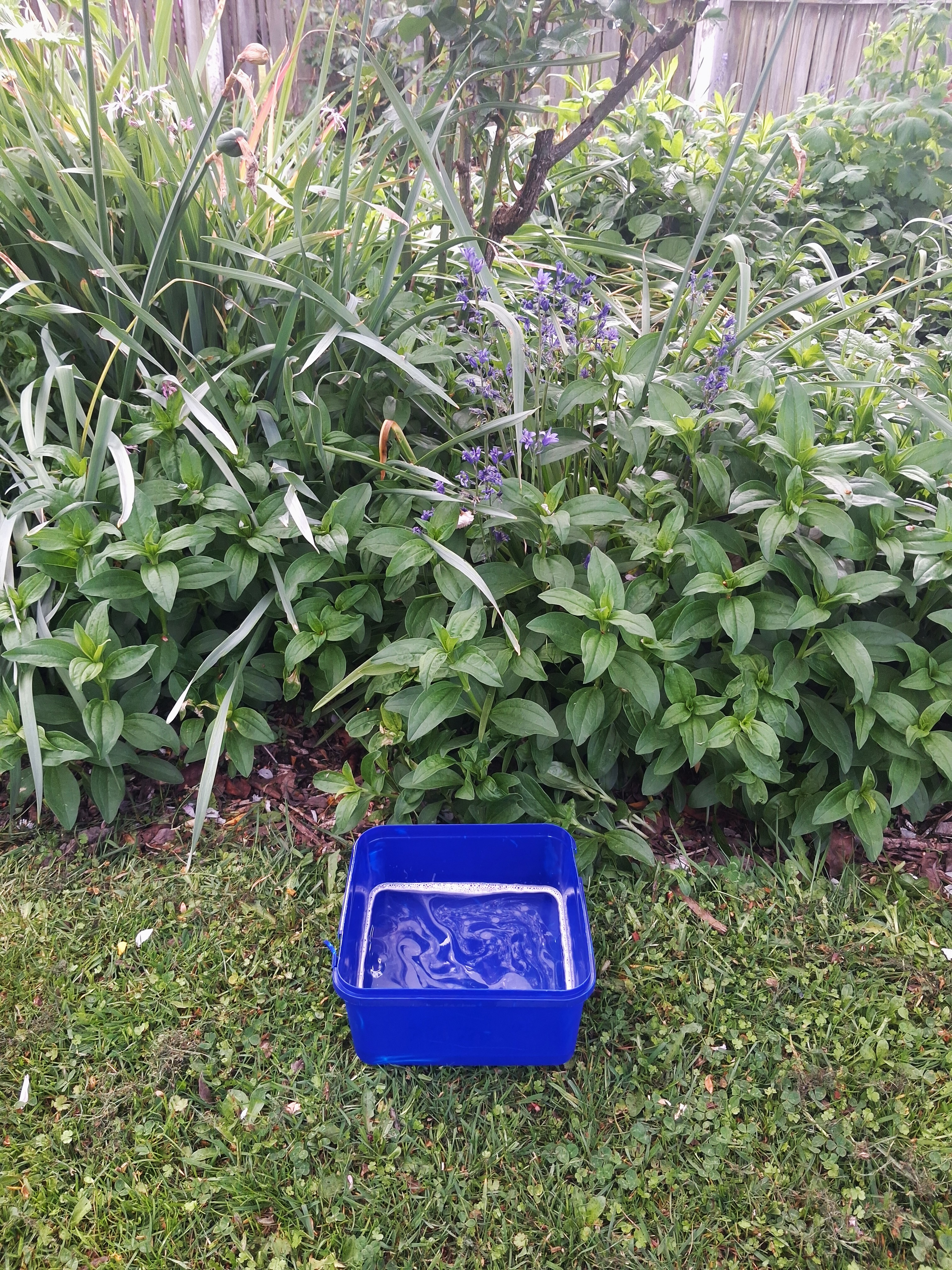
A simple pan trap made from a blue ice cream container

The color of pan traps attracts diverse groups of flying insects. Some pollinators confuse the traps with natural flowers, causing the capture of flying pollinator species, including bees. Some studies have suggested that bee species are more attracted and likely to be captured in blue or white pans compared to yellow pans. However, yellow and white pan traps consistently collect the largest number of species.

== Height ==
In an environment with vegetation stratification, the catch rate of pollinators can depend on the height of the pan trap. When foraging pollinators will often move between flowers at the same height. Some taxa can occupy specific layers in vegetation, large bumblebees such as Bombus lapidarius interact frequently with flowers more than 40cm off the ground. The height of the flower relative to the surrounding vegetation is also key. Large bees visit tall flowers more when the surrounding vegetation is taller.
