= Malaise trap =

Type of insect trap

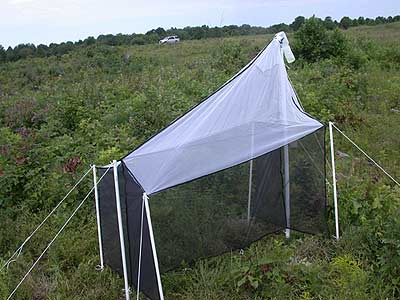
A Malaise trap

A Malaise trap is a large, tent-like structure used for trapping, killing, and preserving flying insects, particularly Hymenoptera and Diptera. The trap is made of a material such as PET (polyester) netting and can be various colours. Insects fly into the tent wall and are funneled into a collecting vessel attached to its highest point. It was invented by René Malaise in 1934.

== Structure ==
Many versions of the Malaise trap are used, but the basic structure consists of a tent with a large opening at the bottom for insects to fly into and a tall central wall that directs the flying insects upward to a cylinder containing a killing agent. The chemical varies according to purpose and access. Conventionally, cyanide was used inside the jar with an absorbent material.

However, due to restrictions, many people use ethanol. Ethanol damages some flying insects such as lepidopterans, but most people use the malaise trap primarily for hymenopterans and dipterans. In addition, ethanol keeps the specimens preserved for a longer period of time. Other dry killing agents including no-pest strips (dichlorvos) and ethyl acetate need to be checked more regularly.

== Design details ==
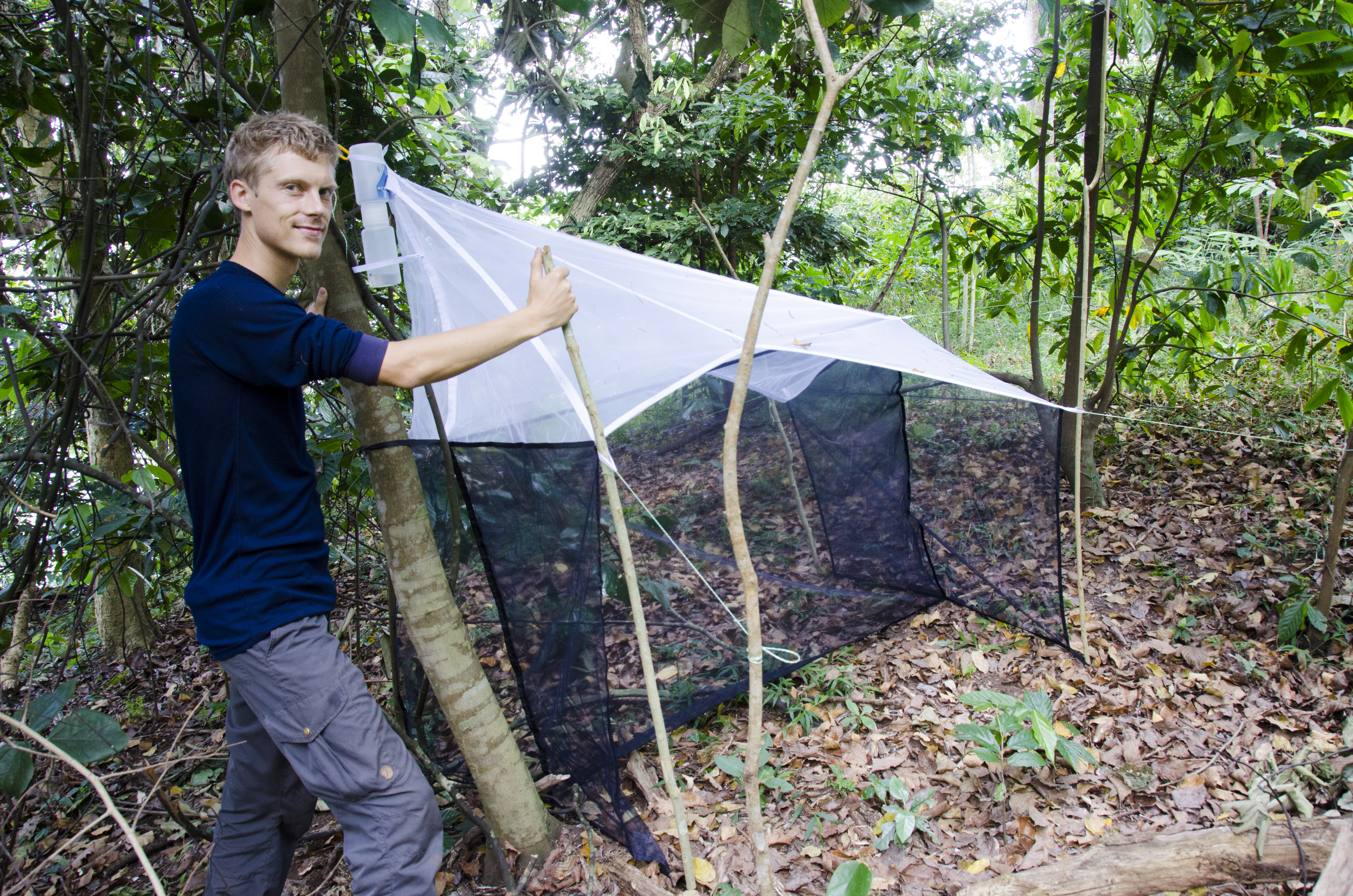
Setting up a Malaise trap in Udzungwa Mountains National Park

=== Cylinder ===
When choosing a Malaise trap design, the types of insects to catch must be considered. The opening to the cylinder is of key importance. Typically, the opening is around 12–15 mm (0.47–0.59 in), and can vary according to the size of insect desired. If using a dry agent, a smaller hole results in a faster death, limiting the amount of damage a newly caught insect can inflict on older, fragile specimens. In ethanol, this is less of a concern. Larger holes potentially allow in more butterflies, moths, and dragonflies.

=== Location ===
Placement of the trap is very important. It should be positioned to maximize the number of flying insects that pass through the opening. This is determined by the natural features of the site. One should evaluate topography, vegetation, wind, and water. For example, if a wide corridor in a forest such as a trail is used, the trap should be oriented with its opening toward the corridor. Also, places where vegetation is growing high around the opening limits the number of flying insects that enter the trap. Other ideal places may be above small streams or on edges of forests.

A well-placed trap in ideal seasonal conditions can catch over 1,000 insects a day. Even in less-ideal conditions, such as rain, the trap is still effective.

== Other uses ==
The Malaise trap can also function as a light trap. If a lamp is placed at the end opposite of the opening, the light will attract insects into the trap. Specimens should be collected and removed at dawn and dusk to determine insects caught in daytime versus the night. Specimens should be removed from the trap at least once a week if using ethanol, or more often if using a dry killing agent.

The design of the trap catches insects that naturally fly upward when they hit a barrier. However, some insects drop when meeting with a barrier. Addition of a pan with ethanol at the bottom of the main wall will catch specimens such as beetles that fall before reaching the top. A trap without the netting on top, but with just a preservative-filled basin under the barrier is commonly named a flight interception trap.
