= Flight interception trap =

Insect trapping device

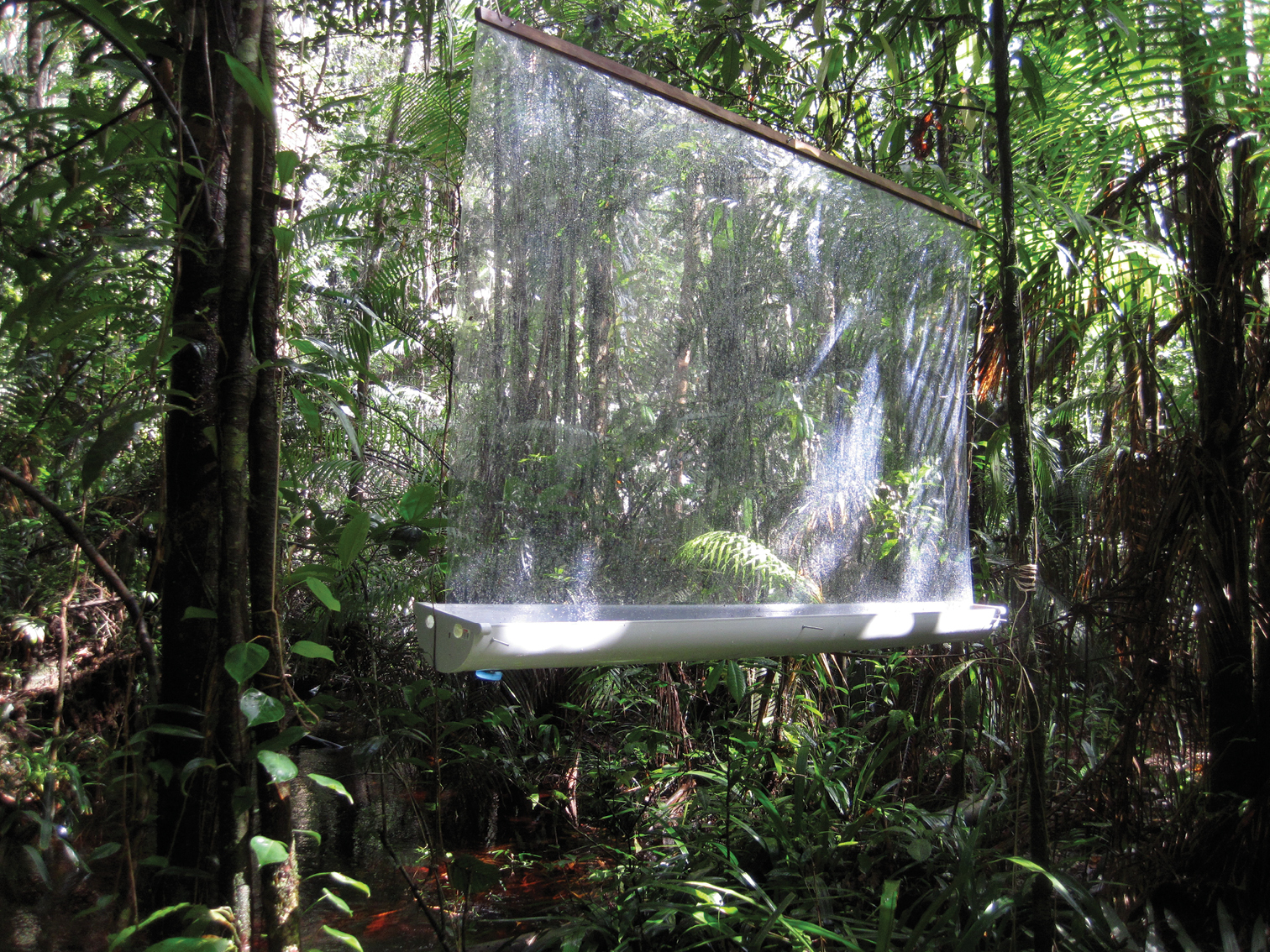
A hanging trap in a forest

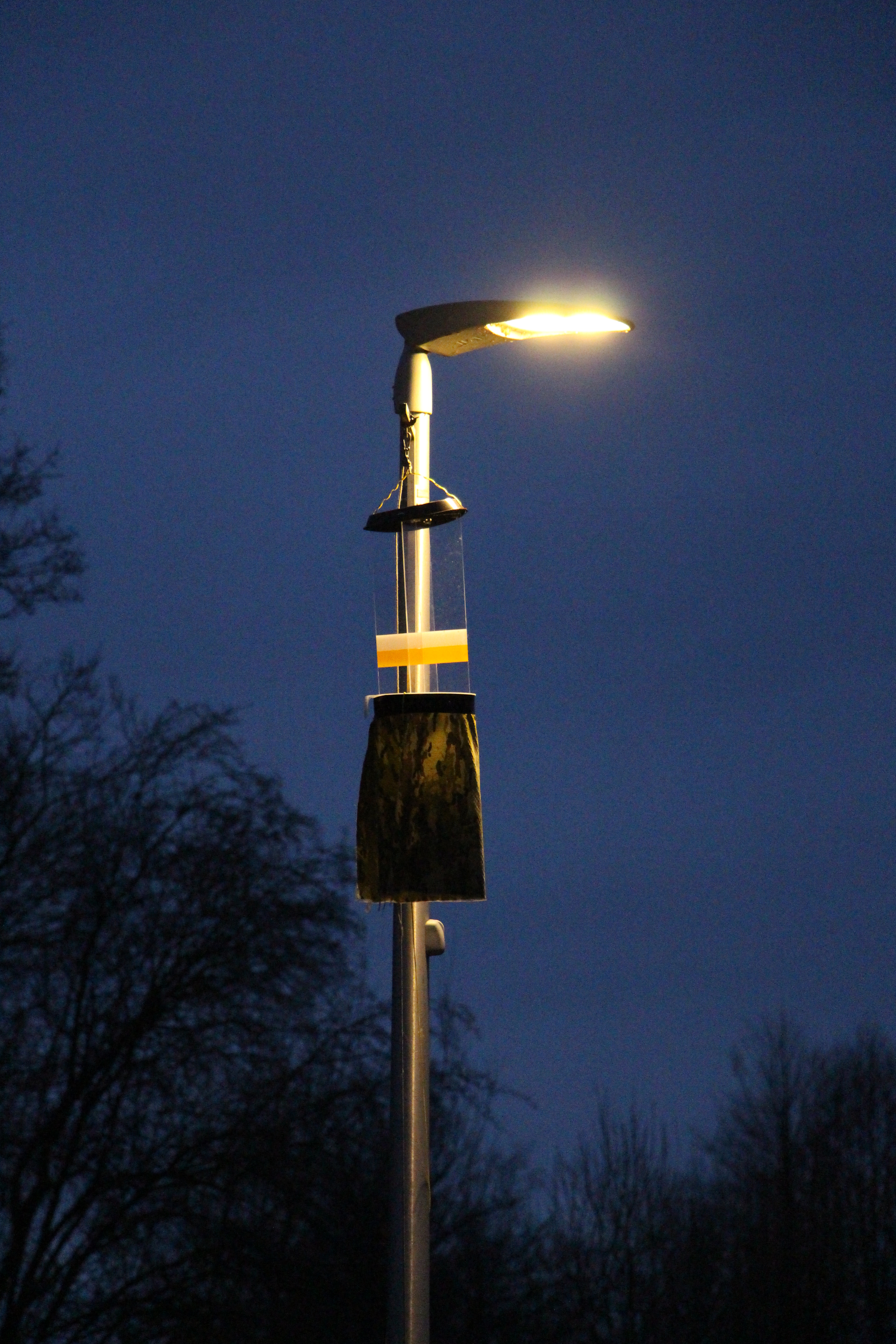
Flight interception trap deployed in a research project investigating effects of light pollution on insects

A flight interception trap (or FIT) is a widely used trapping, killing, and preserving system for flying insects. It is especially well-suited for collecting beetles, since these animals usually drop themselves after flying into an object, rather than flying upward (in which case a Malaise trap is a better option). Flight Interception Traps are mainly used to collect flying species which are not likely to be attracted to bait or light.

== Construction ==
The basis of any Flight Interception Trap consists of an upright placed see-through barrier under which one or more small basins are placed. The barrier may consist of such materials as plastic mesh, a transparent plastic sheet or even Plexiglas, although the latter does not work well for day-active insects since it is visible to them due to its specific refraction. The basins are filled with a preserving fluid such as ethanol (which should be mixed with something bad-tasting (like denatonium) to prevent wild animals drinking it), propylene glycol, salt-saturated water or even plain water. The best preservative to keep internal organs in good condition is FAACC, a solution of formaldehyde. A small amount of detergent is added to break the surface tension, causing the insects to sink. Yellow (a colour which attracts many insects) pans with soapy water may be used alone. The water itself can be an attractant in dry environments .

== Location ==
Depending on either the desired information (for research) or desired species (for collection and/or trade) the construction can be put in open land or in the forest. It is important to place the barrier in a straight angle with the most likely flying route for insects (e.g. blocking a forest corridor), so as to maximize results.

== Checking ==
The basins can be checked daily (when it is e.g. important to check the activity of the desired insects under different weather conditions), weekly or even less often. Maximum time between two checks depends on the used preservatives, since not all preservatives are equally suited for preserving insects for a longer time.

== Cover ==
To prevent the basins from filling up with litter, most researchers place some kind of roof over the trap. This keeps leaves from falling in while it also keeps the rain out (which could otherwise dilute the preservative or cause an overflow).
