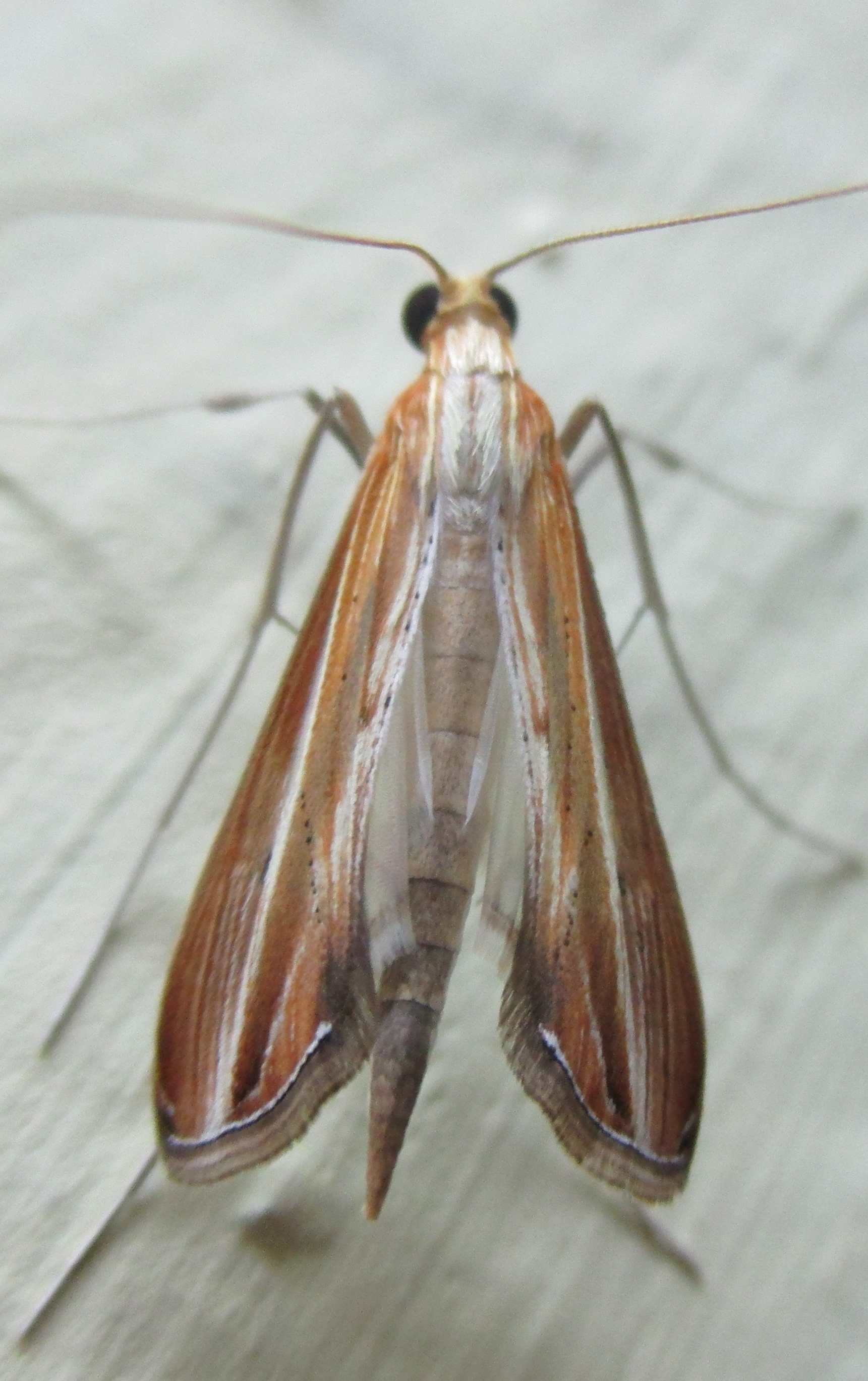
- Adult male of Euclasta vitralis

Scientific classification
- Kingdom: Animalia
- Phylum: Arthropoda
- Clade: Pancrustacea
- Class: Insecta
- Order: Lepidoptera
- Family: Crambidae
- Subfamily: Pyraustinae
- Tribe: Euclastini; Popescu-Gorj & Constantinescu, 1977

= Euclastini =

Tribe of moths

Euclastini is a tribe of the subfamily Pyraustinae in the moth family Crambidae. The taxon was initially erected by Popescu-Gorj & Constantinescu in 1977 for the genus Euclasta.

== Description ==
Adult Euclastini are moths with narrow wings folded over the body in resting position, with the front of the body raised up by long, slender legs while the tip of the abdomen is held close to the ground. In this, they resemble moths of the genus Lineodes. The tribe is characterised by a number of synapomorphies, particularly in the morphology of the genitalia. The male genitalia feature a bulbous uncus head bearing multisetose setae (in Euclasta) or simple and tune fork-shaped setae (in Afreuclasta); the valvae are trapezoid or elongate tongue-shaped and lack a fibula. In the female genitalia, a membranous appendix bursae is emerging from the anterior end of the ductus bursae, close to where it transitions into the corpus bursae; the sclerotised signum in the corpus bursae has the shape of puckered lips (in Euclasta) or of a rhomboid (in Afreuclasta).

Life stages of Euclastini other than the adult stage are poorly studied, and information is published only for a few species, such as Euclasta whalleyi.

== Food plants ==
The caterpillars of Euclastini feed on plants of the Apocynaceae family. This host specificity has been used for the control of rubber vine, Cryptostegia grandiflora, an invasive species of plant in Australia.

== Distribution ==
Euclastini, as currently understood, are found in the Afrotropical, Palearctic, Indomalayan and Australasian realms, but are absent from the New World, consisting of the Neotropical and Nearctic realms.

== Systematics ==
The tribe was originally proposed as subfamily Euclastinae in 1977 by Popescu-Gorj & Constantinescu, but was later considered a synonym of Pyraustinae. In a phylogenetic analysis of Pyraustinae and Spilomelinae, Euclasta was found to be sister to all remaining Pyraustinae (except for Tetridia), and thus the taxon was reinstated on the level of tribe as 'Euclastini'.

Some morphological characters of Euclastini are shared with other taxa, potentially indicating a common evolutionary origin. The shape of the valvae in the male genitalia of Euclasta is similar to that found in Chilopionea and some species of Chilochroma. In the female genitalia, the characteristic shape of ‘puckered lips’ of the signum in Euclasta is shared with Tetridia. The origin of the appendix bursae at the anterior end of the ductus bursae appears to be a synapomorphy shared with Portentomorphini and Tetridia. Several other genera have been postulated as potentially closely associated with Euclastini, such as Paschiodes and Duzulla, as well as Saucrobotys.

Euclastini currently comprises 18 species in two genera:

- Afreuclasta Maes, 2023 (one species: A. ruwenzoriensis Maes, 2023)
- Euclasta Lederer, 1855 (synonyms Illurgia Walker, 1859, Proteuclasta Munroe, 1958; 17 species)
