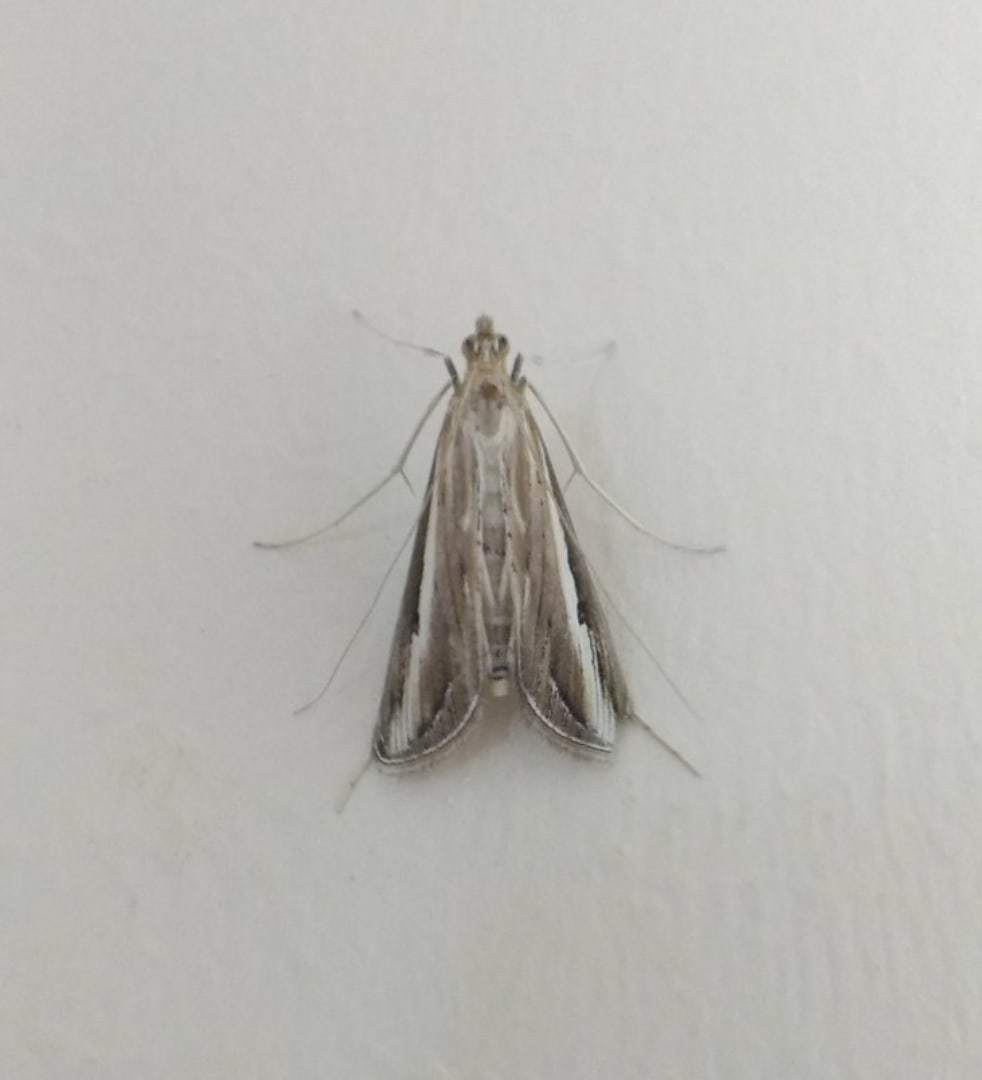

Scientific classification
- Domain: Eukaryota
- Kingdom: Animalia
- Phylum: Arthropoda
- Class: Insecta
- Order: Lepidoptera
- Family: Crambidae
- Genus: Euclasta
- Species: E. splendidalis

Binomial name
- Euclasta splendidalis (Herrich-Schäffer, 1848)

Synonyms
- Botys splendidalis Herrich-Schäffer, 1848

= Euclasta splendidalis =

Species of moth

Euclasta splendidalis is a species of moth in the family Crambidae. The species was first described by Gottlieb August Wilhelm Herrich-Schäffer in 1848. It is found in Romania, Bulgaria, the Republic of Macedonia, Greece, Russia, Asia Minor, Turkmenistan, Azerbaijan and Armenia. It has been recorded from Malta, but this is a misidentification of Euclasta varii.

The wingspan is about 32 mm.
