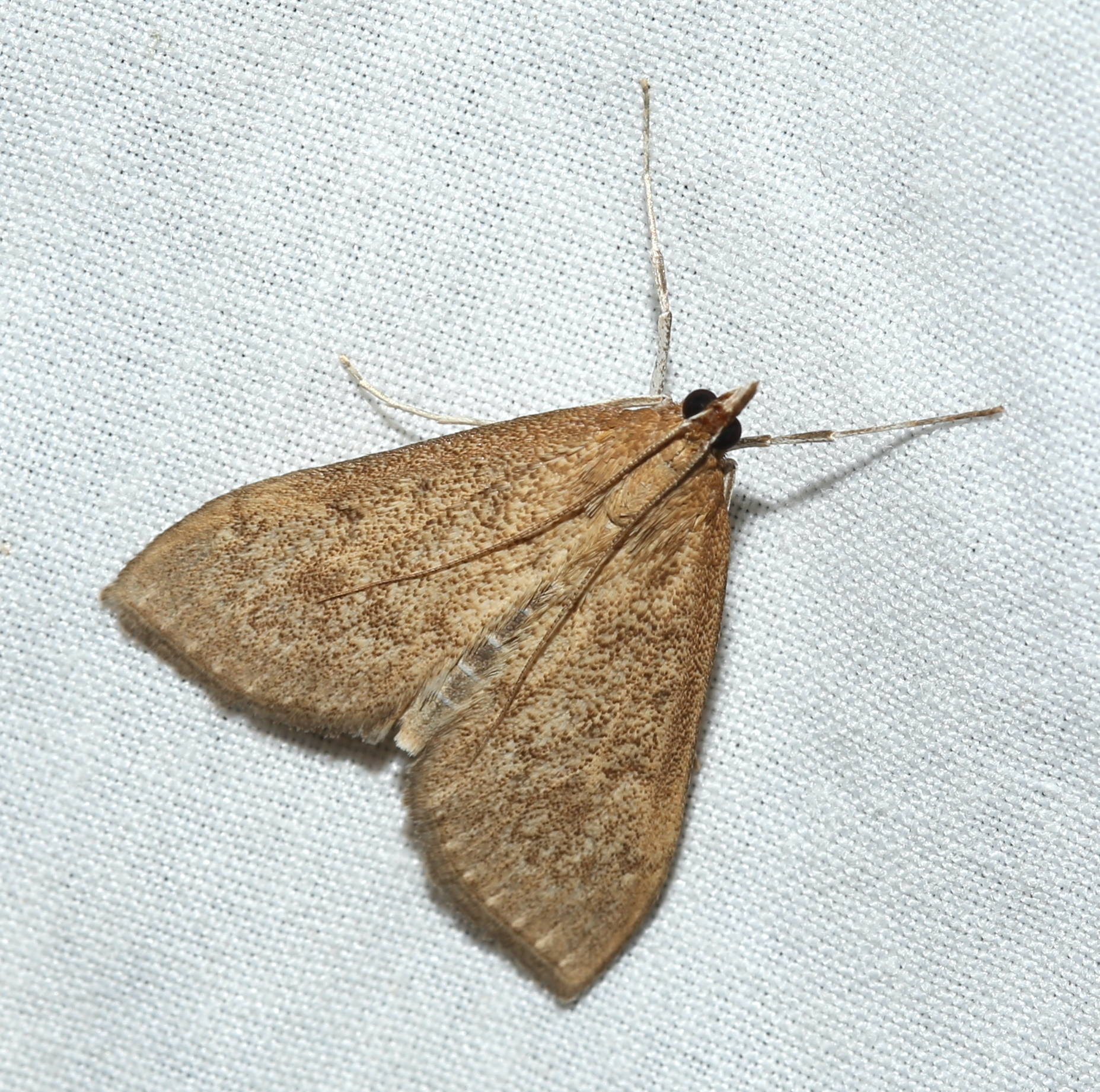
- Adult
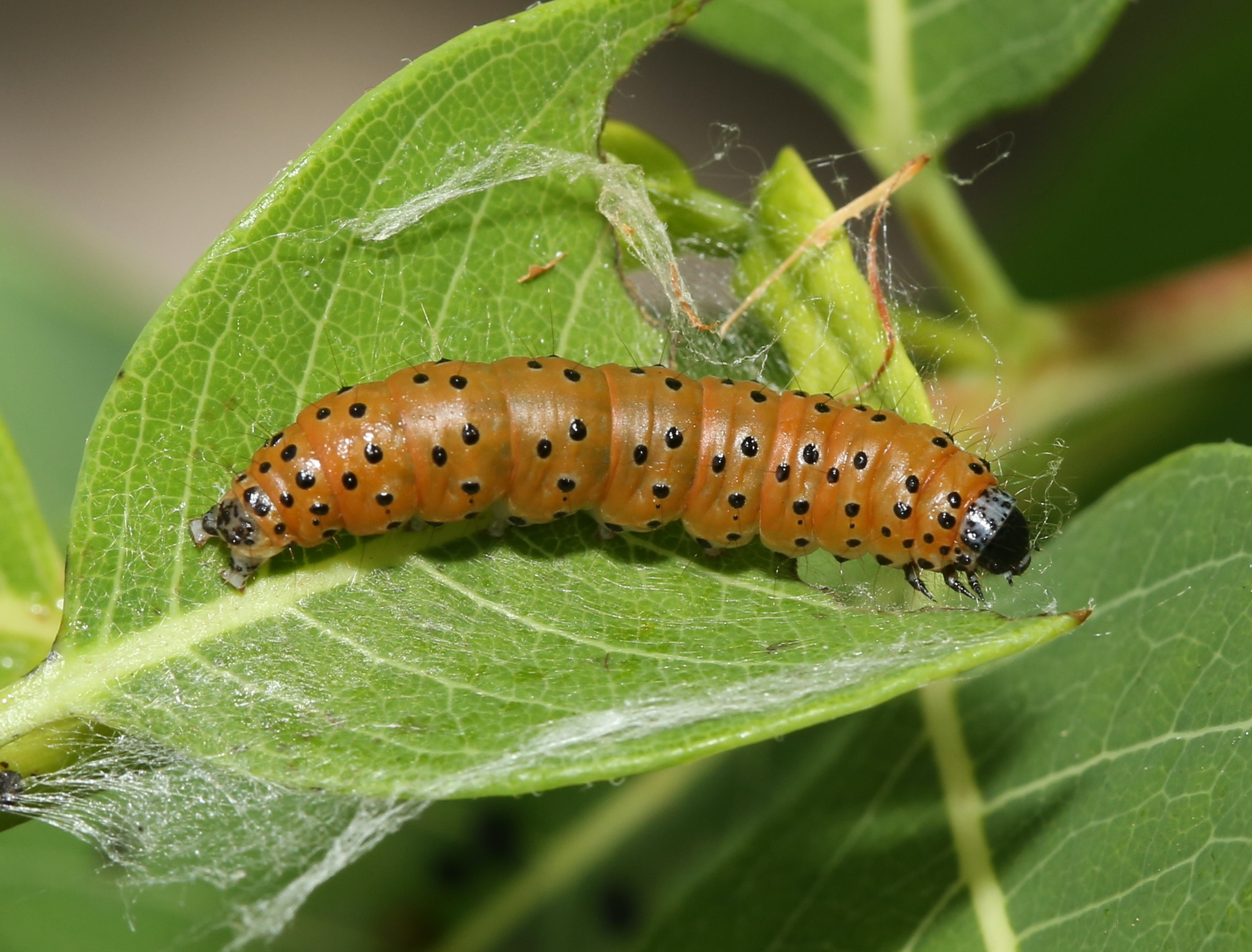
- Larva on dogbane

Scientific classification
- Kingdom: Animalia
- Phylum: Arthropoda
- Class: Insecta
- Order: Lepidoptera
- Family: Crambidae
- Genus: Saucrobotys
- Species: S. futilalis

Binomial name
- Saucrobotys futilalis (Lederer, 1863)

Synonyms
- Botys futilalis Lederer, 1863; Botis erectalis Grote, 1876; Botys inconcinnalis Lederer, 1863; Botis crocotalis Grote, 1881; Botis festalis Hulst, 1886

= Saucrobotys futilalis =

Species of moth

Saucrobotys futilalis, the dogbane saucrobotys moth, is a moth in the family Crambidae. It was described by Julius Lederer in 1863. It is found in North America, where it has been recorded from the north-east to British Columbia and south to Texas and California.

The length of the forewings is 14–16 mm. Adults are on wing from May to July.

The larvae feed on Apocynum (including Apocynum cannabinum) and Asclepias species (including Asclepias tuberosa). They create silken nests on the host plant. The caterpillars also defend against predation by regurgitating the contents of their guts.

== Subspecies ==
- Saucrobotys futilalis futilalis (Quebec to Manitoba, Illinois, New Jersey, Pennsylvania)
- Saucrobotys futilalis inconcinnalis (Lederer, 1863) (Alberta and British Columbia to California, Arizona, Texas)

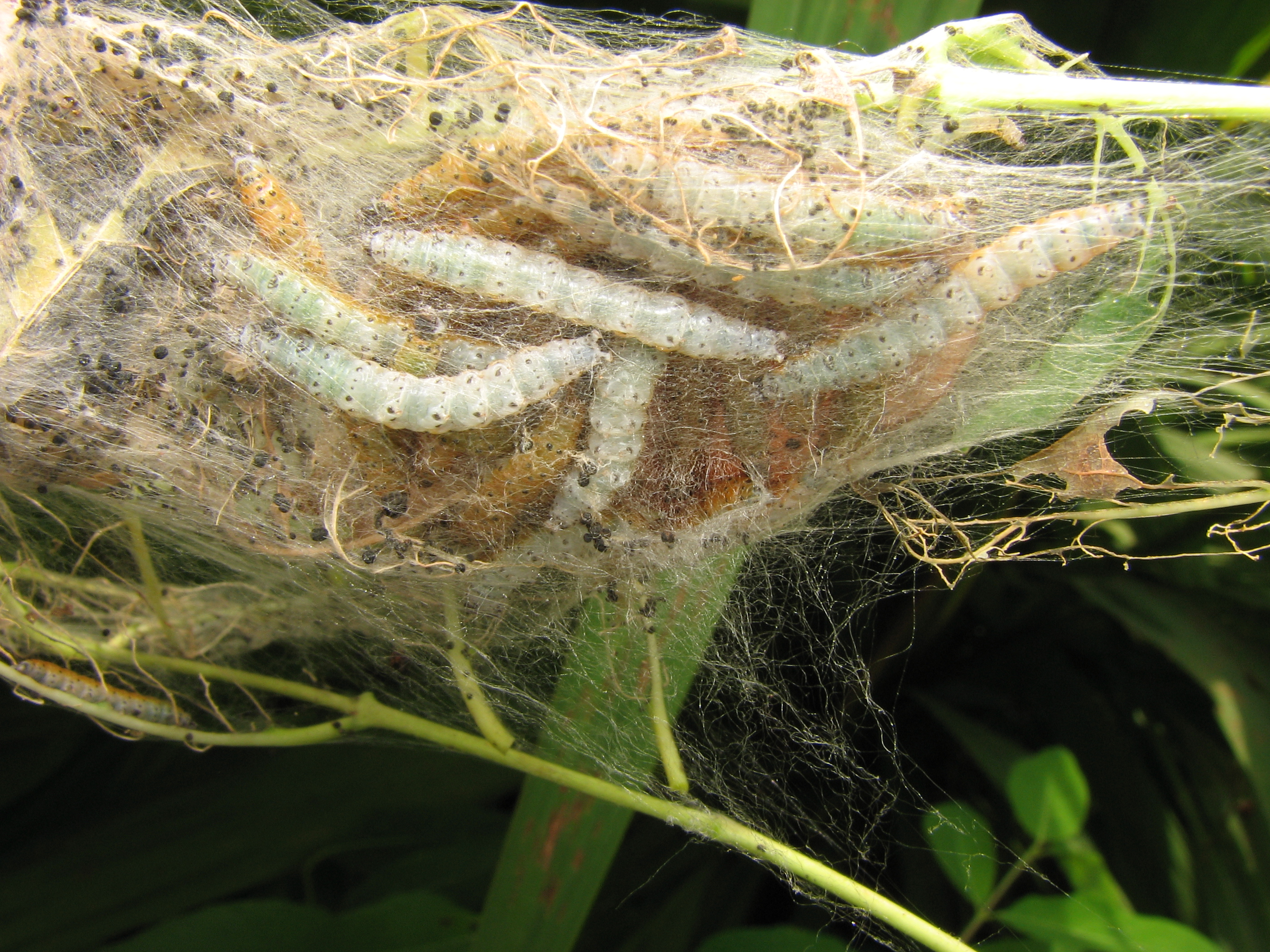
Larvae on dogbane
