= Euclasta filigeralis =

Scientific classification
- Domain: Eukaryota
- Kingdom: Animalia
- Phylum: Arthropoda
- Class: Insecta
- Order: Lepidoptera
- Family: Crambidae
- Genus: Euclasta
- Species: E. filigeralis

Binomial name
- Euclasta filigeralis Lederer, 1863

Species of moth

Euclasta filigeralis is a moth in the family Crambidae. It was described by Julius Lederer in 1863. It is found in India.
