= Chilochroma interlinealis =

Scientific classification
- Kingdom: Animalia
- Phylum: Arthropoda
- Class: Insecta
- Order: Lepidoptera
- Family: Crambidae
- Genus: Chilochroma
- Species: C. interlinealis

Binomial name
- Chilochroma interlinealis (Dyar, 1917)

Synonyms
- Pyrausta interlinealis Dyar, 1917; Chilochroma calamochrella Amsel, 1956

Species of moth

Chilochroma interlinealis is a moth in the family Crambidae. It was described by Harrison Gray Dyar Jr. in 1917. It is found in Guyana and Venezuela.
