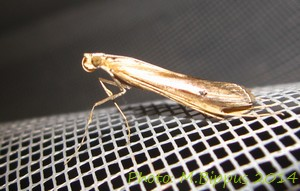
- Euclasta gigantalis whalleyii

Scientific classification
- Kingdom: Animalia
- Phylum: Arthropoda
- Class: Insecta
- Order: Lepidoptera
- Family: Crambidae
- Genus: Euclasta
- Species: E. gigantalis

Binomial name
- Euclasta gigantalis Viette, 1957

Synonyms
- Euclasta whalleyi Popescu-Gorj & Constantinescu, 1973

= Euclasta gigantalis =

Species of moth

Euclasta gigantalis is a species of moth in the family Crambidae. The female has a wingspan of 45mm.

== Distribution ==
It is found in Ethiopia, Kenya, La Réunion and Madagascar.

In 1988 this moth was also released in Australia for biological control of Cryptostegia grandiflora.

== Biology ==
The larvae feed on Camptocarpus mauritianus, Cryptostegia grandiflora, Cryptostegia madagascariensis (Apocynaceae) and Clerodendrum heterophyllum (Lamiaceae).
