= Euclasta defamatalis =

Scientific classification
- Kingdom: Animalia
- Phylum: Arthropoda
- Class: Insecta
- Order: Lepidoptera
- Family: Crambidae
- Genus: Euclasta
- Species: E. defamatalis

Binomial name
- Euclasta defamatalis (Walker, 1859)

Synonyms
- Ilurgia defamatalis Walker, 1859

Species of moth

Euclasta defamatalis is a moth in the family Crambidae. It was described by Francis Walker in 1859. It is found in India, Sri Lanka and Nepal.
