= Euclasta bacescui =

Scientific classification
- Domain: Eukaryota
- Kingdom: Animalia
- Phylum: Arthropoda
- Class: Insecta
- Order: Lepidoptera
- Family: Crambidae
- Genus: Euclasta
- Species: E. bacescui

Binomial name
- Euclasta bacescui Popescu-Gorj & Constantinescu, 1977

Species of moth

Euclasta bacescui is a moth in the family Crambidae. It was described by Popescu-Gorj and Constantinescu in 1977. It is found in South Africa.
