= Euclasta socotrensis =

Scientific classification
- Domain: Eukaryota
- Kingdom: Animalia
- Phylum: Arthropoda
- Class: Insecta
- Order: Lepidoptera
- Family: Crambidae
- Genus: Euclasta
- Species: E. socotrensis

Binomial name
- Euclasta socotrensis Popescu-Gorj & Constantinescu, 1977

Species of moth

Euclasta socotrensis is a moth in the family Crambidae. It was described by Popescu-Gorj and Constantinescu in 1977. It is found in Yemen, where it has been recorded from Socotra.
