= Euclasta sidamona =

Scientific classification
- Domain: Eukaryota
- Kingdom: Animalia
- Phylum: Arthropoda
- Class: Insecta
- Order: Lepidoptera
- Family: Crambidae
- Genus: Euclasta
- Species: E. sidamona

Binomial name
- Euclasta sidamona Rougeot, 1977

Synonyms
- Euclasta gigantalis sidamona Rougeot, 1977

Species of moth

Euclasta sidamona is a moth in the family of Crambidae. It was described by Rougeot in 1977. It is found in Ethiopia.
