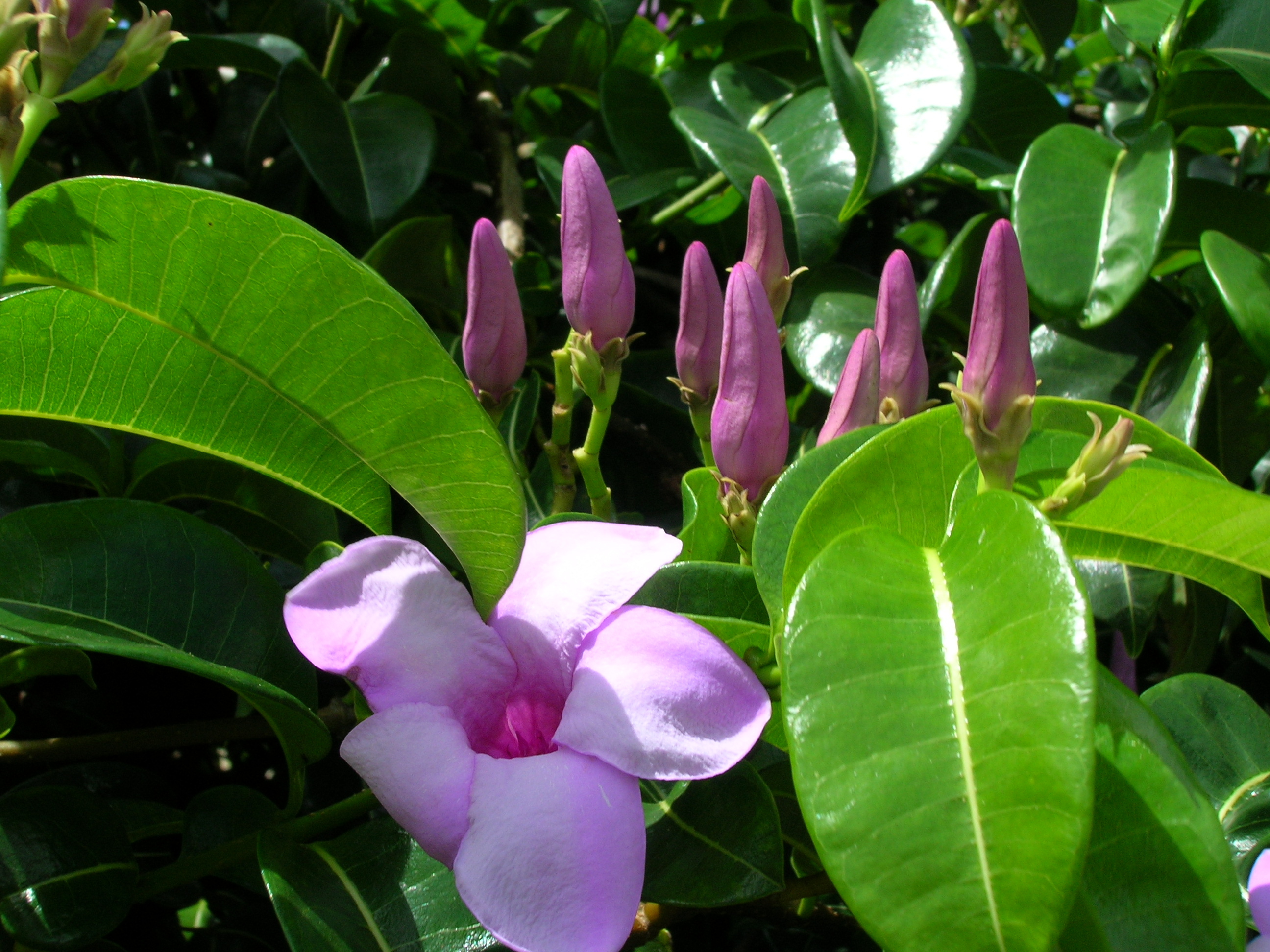
- C. madagascariensis

Scientific classification
- Kingdom: Plantae
- Clade: Tracheophytes
- Clade: Angiosperms
- Clade: Eudicots
- Clade: Asterids
- Order: Gentianales
- Family: Apocynaceae
- Subfamily: Periplocoideae
- Genus: Cryptostegia; R.Br.

Species
- See text
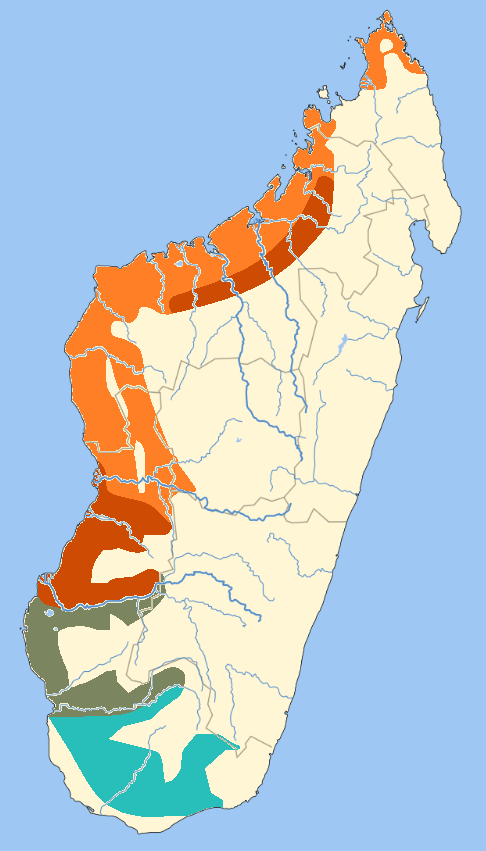
- Native range of genus C. madagascariensis, glabrous form C. madagascariensis, hirsute form C. madagascariensis (hirsute form) in sympatry with C. grandiflora C. grandiflora

= Cryptostegia =

Rubber vines

Genus of plants

Cryptostegia is a genus of flowering plants native to tropical Africa and Madagascar. The genus is in the family Apocynaceae.

== Description ==
Cryptostegia includes three species of slender, many-stemmed, woody, perennial vines. When their stems or leaves are damaged they exude a milky latex that is extremely toxic to livestock; it contains cardiac glycosides that cause sudden death, especially after violent exertion. Though the latex is of good quality it is not used commercially.

Cryptostegia are evergreen and are grown for their showy ornamental vines. They are vigorous and self-supporting and their vines sometimes attain a length of 15m. Leaves are ovate, opposite, glossy and dark green. They are 6–10 cm long and 3–5 cm wide. Clusters of large, showy, funnel-shaped flowers with 5 white to rose-pink or reddish-purple petals bloom in summer after the wet season. Seed pods are rigid 10–12 cm long and 3–4 cm wide, and grow in pairs at the end of a short stalk. The seeds are attached to a silky white floss. The plants grow rampantly in a favourable climate and are invasive in some areas. In Australia Cryptostegia grandiflora in particular has been declared a Weed of National Significance. It is regarded as one of the worst weeds in Australia because of its invasiveness, potential for spread, and economic and environmental impacts.

In cultivation, the plants require a hot climate.

== Image Gallery ==
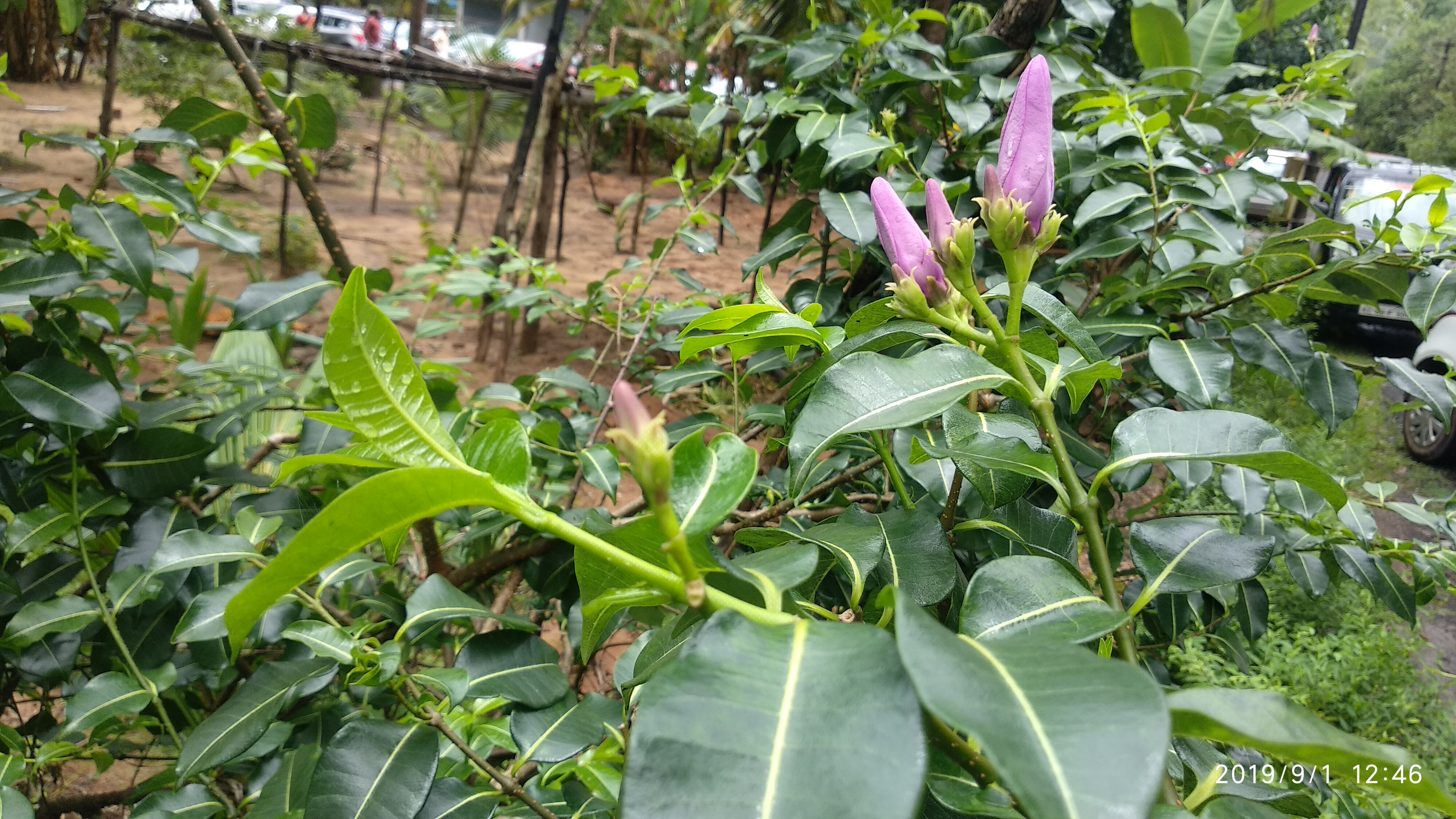
Cryptostegia

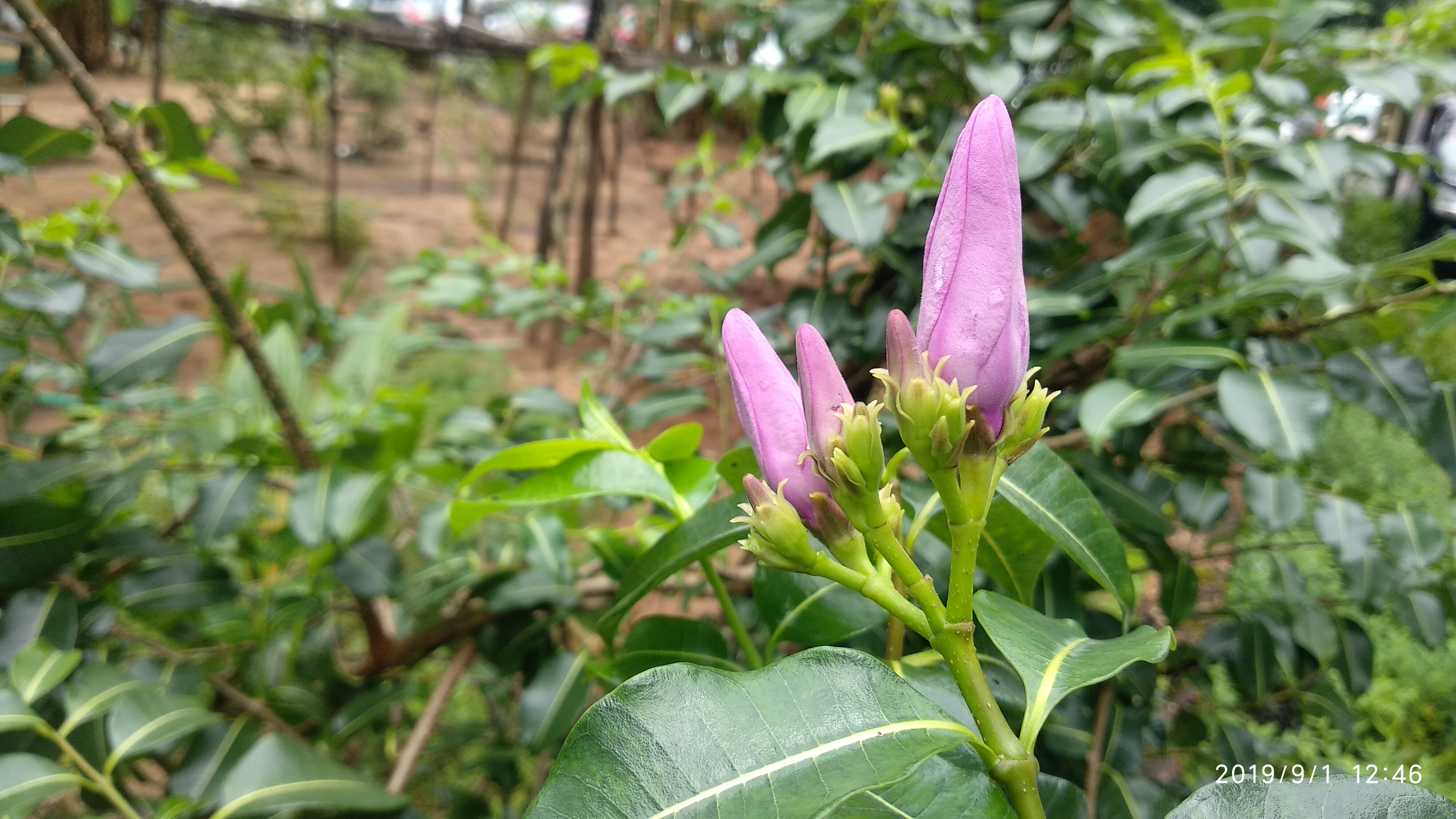
Cryptostegia buds

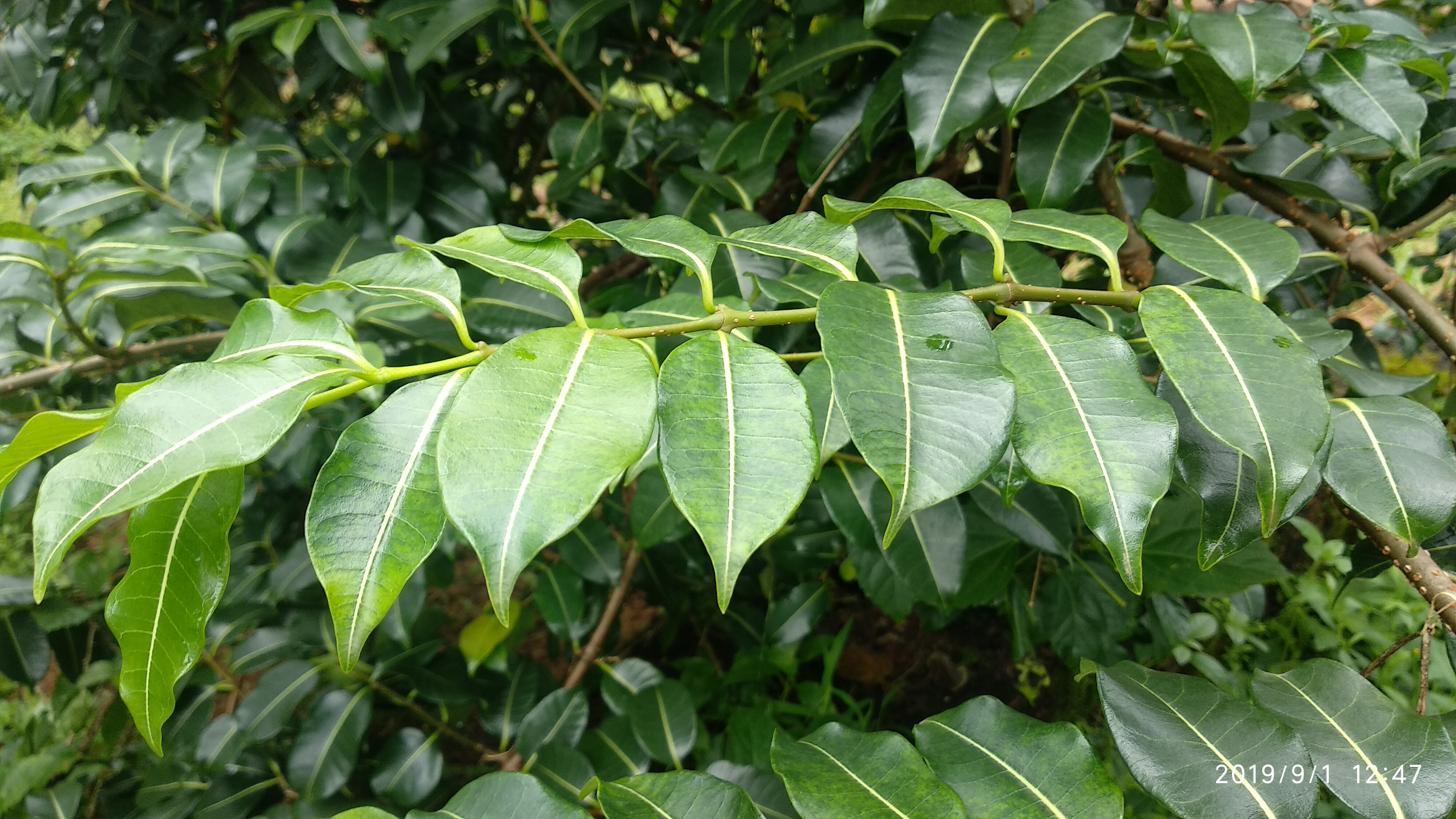
Cryptostegia leaves

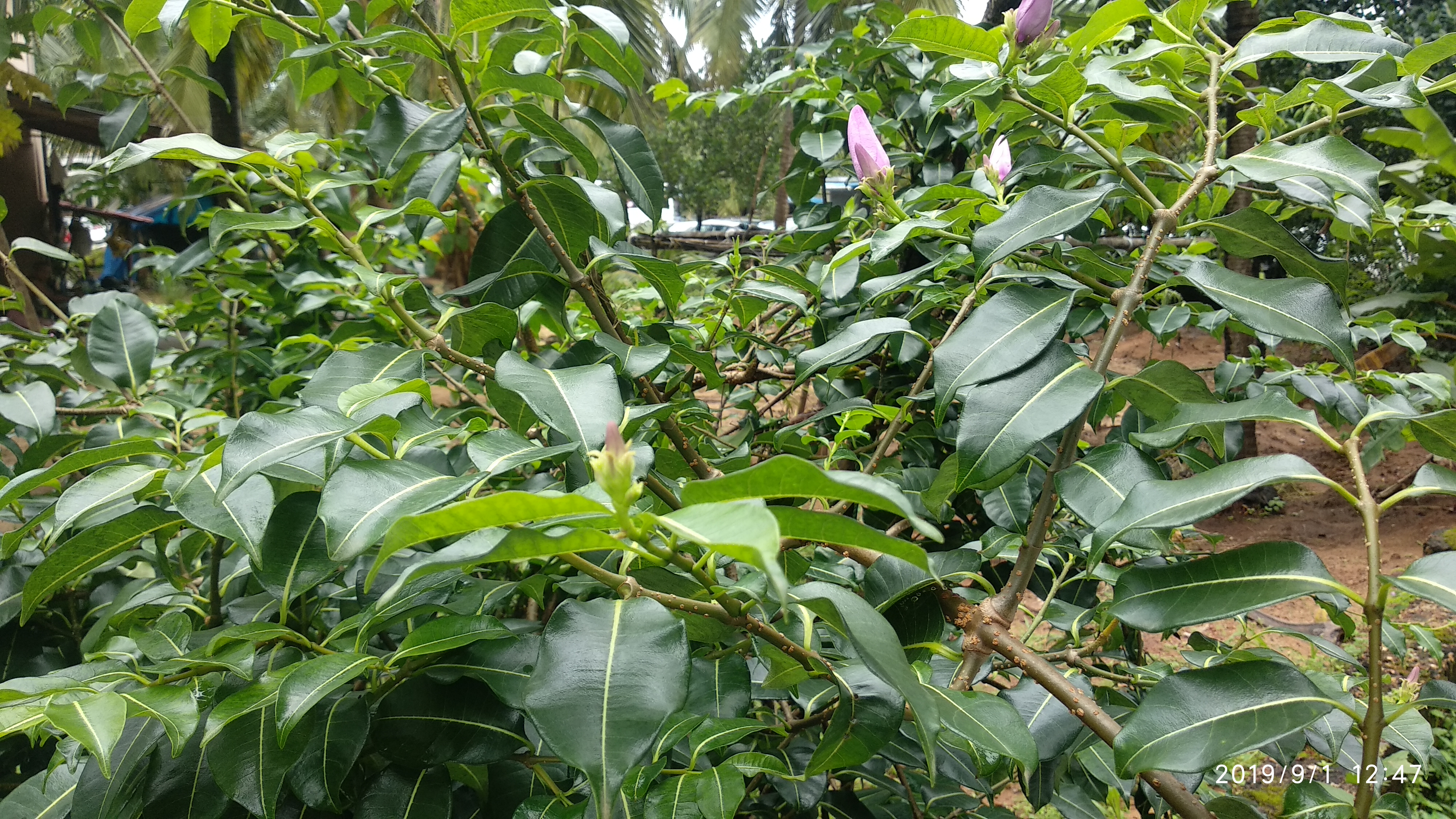
Cryptostegia plant

== Species ==
- Cryptostegia grandiflora R.Br. – rubber vine, purple allamanda
- Cryptostegia madagascariensis Bojer ex Decne. – purple rubber vine
