= Chilochroma albicostalis =

Scientific classification
- Kingdom: Animalia
- Phylum: Arthropoda
- Class: Insecta
- Order: Lepidoptera
- Family: Crambidae
- Genus: Chilochroma
- Species: C. albicostalis

Binomial name
- Chilochroma albicostalis (Hampson, 1913)

Synonyms
- Pyrausta albicostalis Hampson, 1913; Cybolomia govinalis Schaus, 1933

Species of moth

Chilochroma albicostalis is a moth in the family Crambidae. It was described by George Hampson in 1913. It is found in Brazil.
