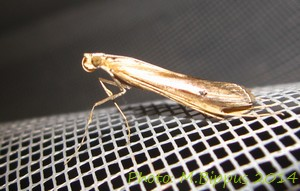
- Euclasta gigantalis

Scientific classification
- Kingdom: Animalia
- Phylum: Arthropoda
- Clade: Pancrustacea
- Class: Insecta
- Order: Lepidoptera
- Family: Crambidae
- Subfamily: Pyraustinae
- Tribe: Euclastini
- Genus: Euclasta; Lederer, 1855

Species
- See text

Synonyms
- Ilurgia Walker, 1859; Proteuclasta Munroe, 1958

= Euclasta (moth) =

Genus of moths

Euclasta is a genus of moths of the family Crambidae.

== Species ==
- Euclasta amseli Popescu-Gorj & Constantinescu, 1973
- Euclasta bacescui Popescu-Gorj & Constantinescu, 1977
- Euclasta defamatalis (Walker, 1859)
- Euclasta filigeralis Lederer, 1863
- Euclasta gigantalis Viette, 1957
- Euclasta insularis Viette, 1958
- Euclasta maceratalis Lederer, 1863
- Euclasta mirabilis Amsel, 1949
- Euclasta montalbani Popescu-Gorj & Constantinescu, 1977
- Euclasta pauli Popescu-Gorj & Constantinescu, 1973
- Euclasta sidamona Rougeot, 1977
- Euclasta socotrensis Popescu-Gorj & Constantinescu, 1977
- Euclasta splendidalis (Herrich-Schäffer, 1848)
- Euclasta stoetzneri (Caradja, 1927)
- Euclasta varii Popescu-Gorj & Constantinescu, 1973
- Euclasta vitralis Maes, 1997
- Euclasta warreni Distant, 1892
