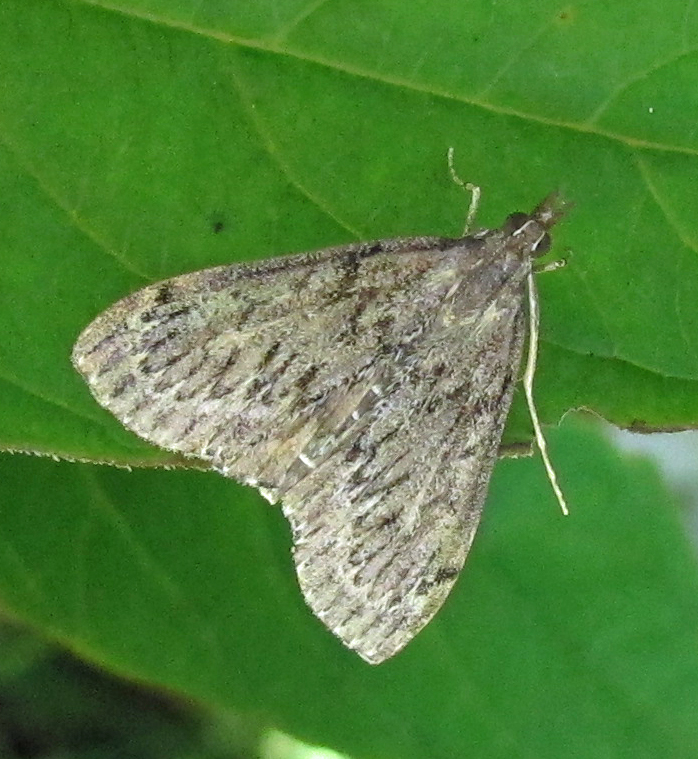

Scientific classification
- Domain: Eukaryota
- Kingdom: Animalia
- Phylum: Arthropoda
- Class: Insecta
- Order: Lepidoptera
- Family: Crambidae
- Genus: Saucrobotys
- Species: S. fumoferalis

Binomial name
- Saucrobotys fumoferalis (Hulst, 1886)

Synonyms
- Botis fumoferalis Hulst, 1886

= Saucrobotys fumoferalis =

Species of moth

Saucrobotys fumoferalis, the dusky saucrobotys moth, is a moth in the family Crambidae. It was described by George Duryea Hulst in 1886. It is found in North America, where it has been recorded from Nova Scotia west to British Columbia, north to Yukon, and south to Pennsylvania, Illinois and California. The habitat consists of boreal forests, mixed forests and woodlots.

The wingspan is about 30 mm. Adults have been recorded on wing from April to September.

The larvae feed on Carya species.
