= Euclasta warreni =

Scientific classification
- Domain: Eukaryota
- Kingdom: Animalia
- Phylum: Arthropoda
- Class: Insecta
- Order: Lepidoptera
- Family: Crambidae
- Genus: Euclasta
- Species: E. warreni

Binomial name
- Euclasta warreni Distant, 1892

Synonyms
- Euclasta hiracopis Meyrick, 1933

Species of moth

Euclasta warreni is a moth in the family Crambidae. It was described by William Lucas Distant in 1892. It is found in the Democratic Republic of the Congo, Ethiopia, South Africa, Zimbabwe, and Mali.
