= Euclasta mirabilis =

Scientific classification
- Domain: Eukaryota
- Kingdom: Animalia
- Phylum: Arthropoda
- Class: Insecta
- Order: Lepidoptera
- Family: Crambidae
- Genus: Euclasta
- Species: E. mirabilis

Binomial name
- Euclasta mirabilis Amsel, 1949

Synonyms
- Euclasta mirabilis pinheyi Popescu-Gorj & Constantinescu, 1977

Species of moth

Euclasta mirabilis is a moth in the family Crambidae. It was described by Hans Georg Amsel in 1949. It is found in Pakistan, Iran, the United Arab Emirates and Somalia.
