= Euclasta insularis =

Scientific classification
- Kingdom: Animalia
- Phylum: Arthropoda
- Class: Insecta
- Order: Lepidoptera
- Family: Crambidae
- Genus: Euclasta
- Species: E. insularis

Binomial name
- Euclasta insularis Viette, 1958

Species of moth

Euclasta insularis is a moth in the family Crambidae. It was described by Viette in 1958. It is found in Cape Verde.
