= Euclasta stoetzneri =

Scientific classification
- Domain: Eukaryota
- Kingdom: Animalia
- Phylum: Arthropoda
- Class: Insecta
- Order: Lepidoptera
- Family: Crambidae
- Genus: Euclasta
- Species: E. stoetzneri

Binomial name
- Euclasta stoetzneri (Caradja, 1927)

Synonyms
- Pyrausta stoetzneri Caradja, 1927

Species of moth

Euclasta stoetzneri is a moth in the family Crambidae. It was described by Aristide Caradja in 1927. It is found in Sichuan, China. The species is named after Walther Stötzner who led an expedition into China during which the first described specimens were collected.
