= Euclasta maceratalis =

Scientific classification
- Domain: Eukaryota
- Kingdom: Animalia
- Phylum: Arthropoda
- Class: Insecta
- Order: Lepidoptera
- Family: Crambidae
- Genus: Euclasta
- Species: E. maceratalis

Binomial name
- Euclasta maceratalis Lederer, 1863

Species of moth

Euclasta maceratalis is a moth in the family Crambidae. It was described by Julius Lederer in 1863. It is found in northern Australia, where it has been recorded from Queensland.

The larvae feed on Gymnanthera nitida and Gymnanthera oblonga.
