= Chilochroma yucatana =

Scientific classification
- Domain: Eukaryota
- Kingdom: Animalia
- Phylum: Arthropoda
- Class: Insecta
- Order: Lepidoptera
- Family: Crambidae
- Genus: Chilochroma
- Species: C. yucatana

Binomial name
- Chilochroma yucatana Munroe, 1964

Species of moth

Chilochroma yucatana is a moth in the family Crambidae. It was described by Eugene G. Munroe in 1964. It is found in Yucatán, Mexico.
