= Euclasta pauli =

Scientific classification
- Domain: Eukaryota
- Kingdom: Animalia
- Phylum: Arthropoda
- Class: Insecta
- Order: Lepidoptera
- Family: Crambidae
- Genus: Euclasta
- Species: E. pauli

Binomial name
- Euclasta pauli Popescu-Gorj & Constantinescu, 1973

Species of moth

Euclasta pauli is a moth in the family Crambidae. It was described by Popescu-Gorj and Constantinescu in 1973. It is found in South Africa.
