= Euclasta montalbani =

Scientific classification
- Domain: Eukaryota
- Kingdom: Animalia
- Phylum: Arthropoda
- Class: Insecta
- Order: Lepidoptera
- Family: Crambidae
- Genus: Euclasta
- Species: E. montalbani

Binomial name
- Euclasta montalbani Popescu-Gorj & Constantinescu, 1977

Species of moth

Euclasta montalbani is a moth in the family Crambidae. It was described by Popescu-Gorj and Constantinescu in 1977. It is found in the Philippines (Luzon).
