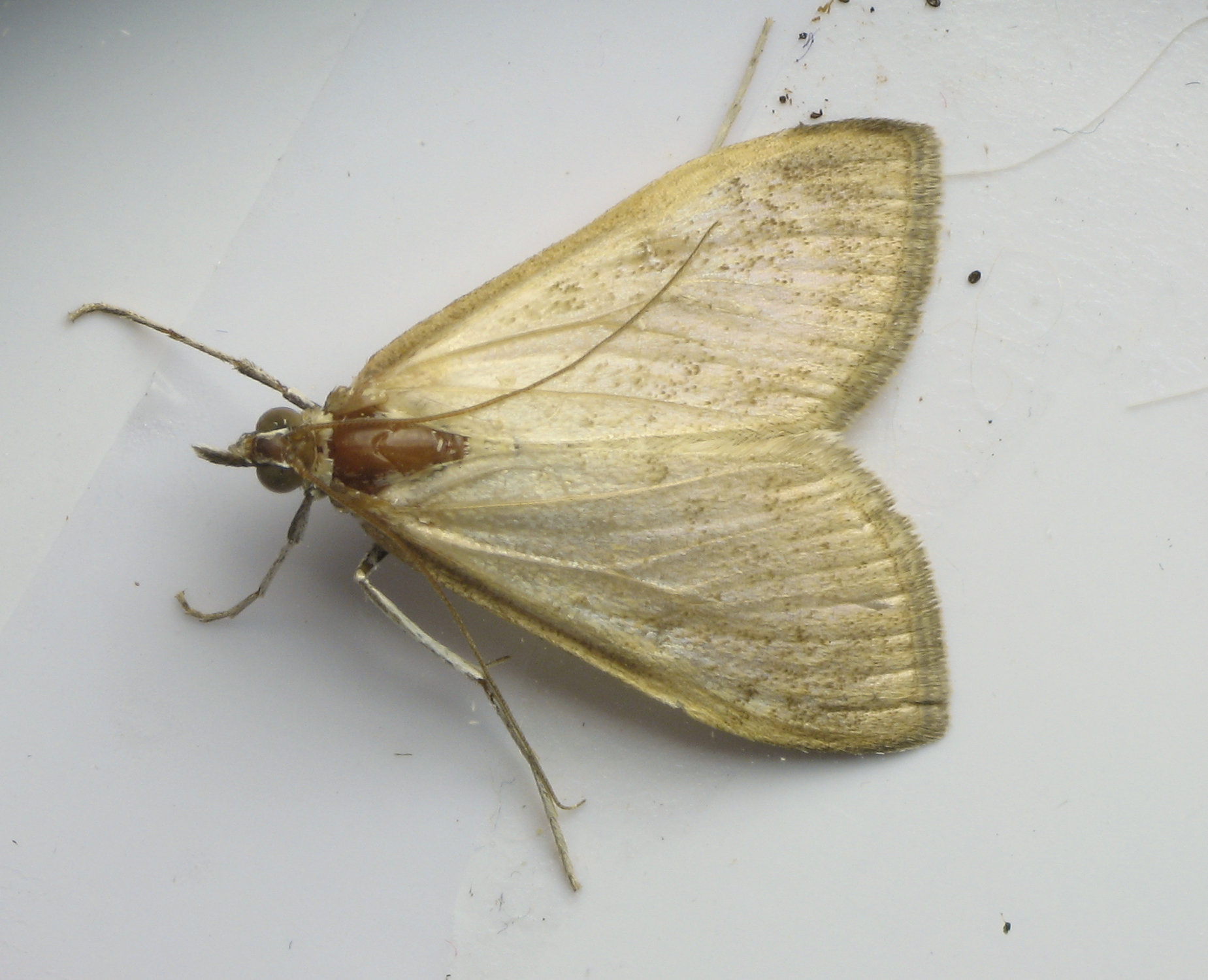
- Saucrobotys futilalis

Scientific classification
- Domain: Eukaryota
- Kingdom: Animalia
- Phylum: Arthropoda
- Class: Insecta
- Order: Lepidoptera
- Family: Crambidae
- Subfamily: Pyraustinae
- Genus: Saucrobotys; Munroe, 1976

= Saucrobotys =

Genus of moths

Saucrobotys is a genus of moths of the family Crambidae.

== Species ==
- Saucrobotys fumoferalis (Hulst, 1886)
- Saucrobotys futilalis (Lederer, 1863)
