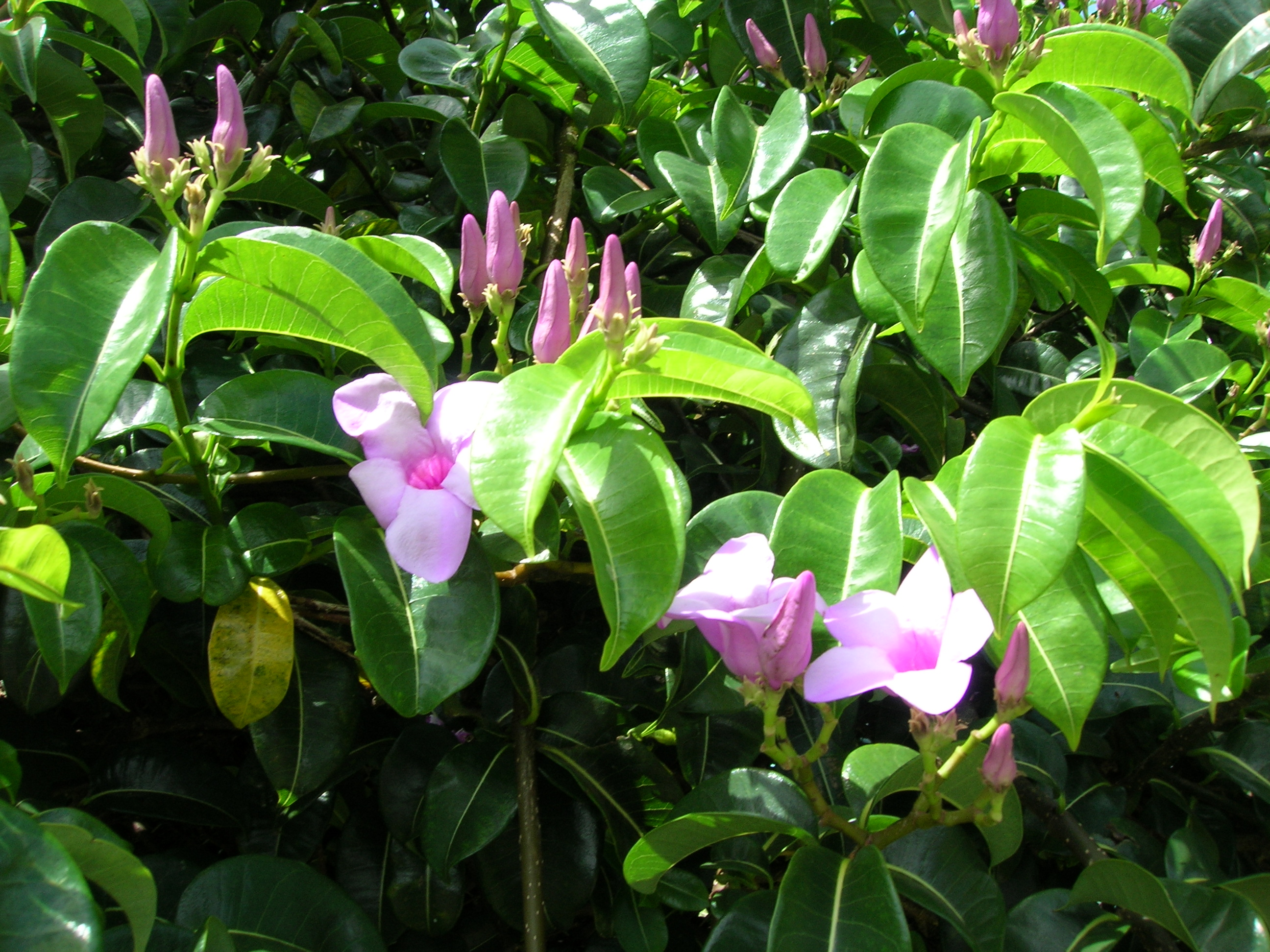
- Flowers and foliage

Scientific classification
- Kingdom: Plantae
- Clade: Tracheophytes
- Clade: Angiosperms
- Clade: Eudicots
- Clade: Asterids
- Order: Gentianales
- Family: Apocynaceae
- Genus: Cryptostegia
- Species: C. madagascariensis

Binomial name
- Cryptostegia madagascariensis Bojer ex Decne.
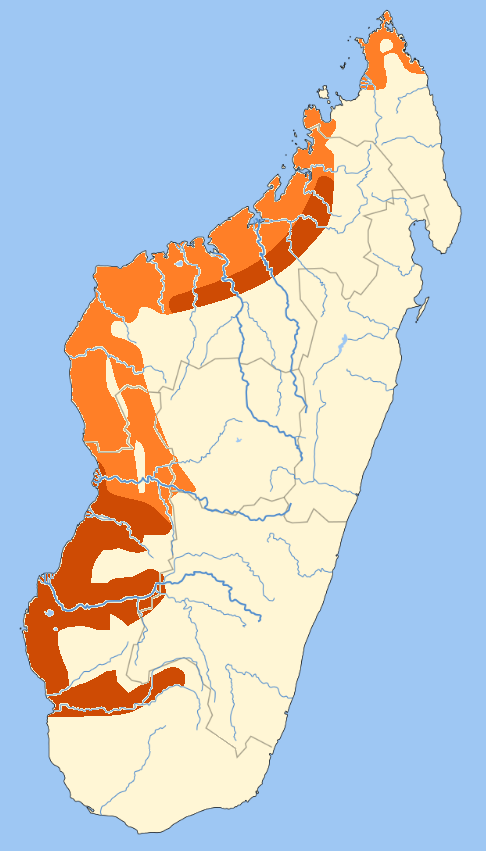
- Native range of species glabrous form hirsute form

Synonyms
- Cryptostegia glaberrima Hochr. Cryptostegia madagascariensis var. glaberrima (Hochr.) Marohasy & P.I.Forst. Cryptostegia madagascariensis var. septentrionalis Marohasy & P.I.Forst.

= Cryptostegia madagascariensis =

Purple rubber vine

Species of plant

Cryptostegia madagascariensis is a species of flowering plant in the family Apocynaceae. It is commonly known as purple rubber vine, is a woody-perennial vine that is native to western and northern Madagascar. It has also been introduced to several tropical and subtropical regions by man, including Puerto Rico and the Virgin Islands. It is very similar to the rubber vine (C. grandiflora), which is also native to Madagascar. In their area of overlap some hybrids have been observed, which are distinguishable by intermediate flower morphology. In the 1930s a hybrid was also developed for horticultural purposes.

Cryptostegia madagascariensis's unripe pods, stems, and leaves break out a toxic white sap . The plant is invasive in many parts of the world, like the Atlantico Department and Colombia's Caribbean coast, and it spreads seeds through the wind and water. The infestation can expand from hillsides, pastures, and waterways, which impacts the biodiversity of native plants and animals in that area due to the plant's poisonous nature. The infestation is usually treated with controlled burnings.
