= Euclasta varii =

Scientific classification
- Kingdom: Animalia
- Phylum: Arthropoda
- Clade: Pancrustacea
- Class: Insecta
- Order: Lepidoptera
- Family: Crambidae
- Genus: Euclasta
- Species: E. varii

Binomial name
- Euclasta varii Popescu-Gorj & Constantinescu, 1973

Synonyms
- Euclasta perisalis Vives Moreno, 1980

Species of moth

Euclasta varii is a species of moth in the family Crambidae. The species is found in Spain, Algeria, Tunisia, Libya, Angola, the Democratic Republic of the Congo, Malawi, Mozambique, Senegal, Sierra Leone, South Africa, Tanzania, Zimbabwe, Zambia and Yemen.

In southern Europe and in the Maghreb countries, there are two generations per year with adults on wing from May/June to August/October.

The larvae feed on Periploca laevigata.
