= Duzulla =

Scientific classification
- Domain: Eukaryota
- Kingdom: Animalia
- Phylum: Arthropoda
- Class: Insecta
- Order: Lepidoptera
- Family: Crambidae
- Subfamily: Spilomelinae
- Genus: Duzulla; Amsel, 1952
- Species: D. subhyalinalis

Binomial name
- Duzulla subhyalinalis (Hampson, 1900)

Synonyms
- Phlyctaenodes subhyalinalis Hampson, 1900

Genus of moths

Duzulla is a genus of moths of the family Crambidae. It contains only one species, Duzulla subhyalinalis, which is found in Syria, Jordan and India.
