= Walther Stötzner =

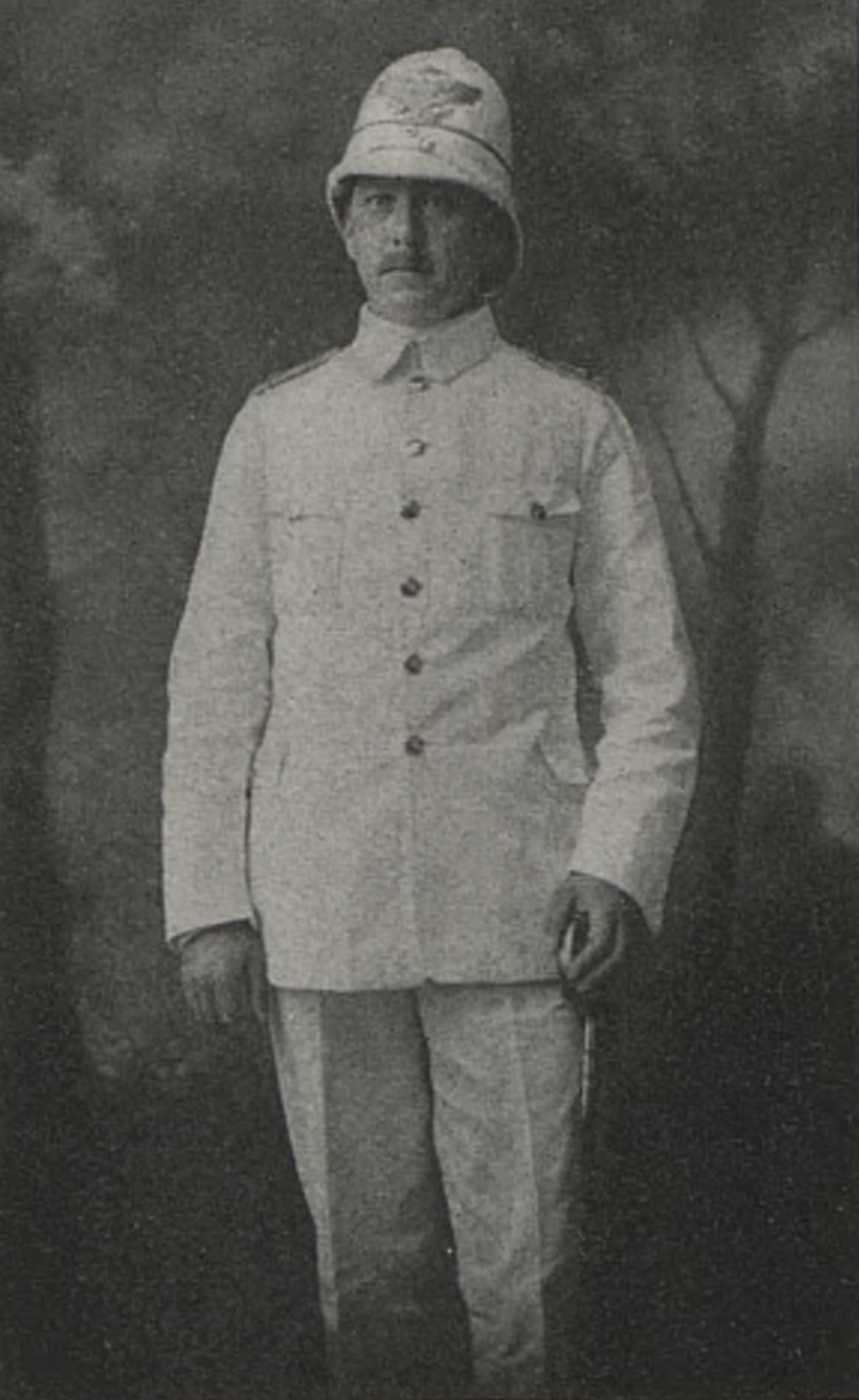
Stötzner, 1919

Walther Stötzner (13 April 1882 – 12 October 1965) was a German explorer, collector, naturalist, ethnographer and writer. He went on expeditions to Persia (1907), Mongolia (1909) and organized an expedition to Sichuan and Tibet between 1913 and 1915. He later travelled to Manchuria and Korea (1927-30).

Stötzner was born in Gera, Thuringia, son of a hotel owner. After the death of his father the family moved to Dresden and after attending grammar school he went to Zittau before going to the Technical University of Munich. He also attended classes at the academy of fine arts at Dresden. He joined a collecting expedition into Persia with his friend E. Funke in 1907. In 1909 he went to Mongolia and Asia Minor. In 1913 he led an expedition into east Asia with a much larger team that included geographer Gottlob Otto Israel, botanist Hans Limpricht and zoologist Hugo Weigold. The team collected numerous ethnological artefacts, plants and animals. The expediation had to be cut short due to the outbreak of World War I. He was among the first Europeans to see giant pandas and tried to bring back a young specimen alive. Many species of plants and animals were named from the collections and several were named after Stötzner including Euclasta stoetzneri, Niphona stoetzneri, Stenopsyche stoetzneri and Anomalophylla stoetzneri. He gave numerous lectures and wrote about this expedition in a book, Ins unerforschte Tibet (1924). His later travels involved less collecting and was ethnological in nature. He sought to live and study the cultures of the Tungusen, Manchurians and ancient tribes in Korea. An account of his Manchurian journey, Malaria, Gold und Opium, was written by Frithjof Melzer (1929). He lived in Dresden-Blasewitz and many of his materials were destroyed during World War II.
