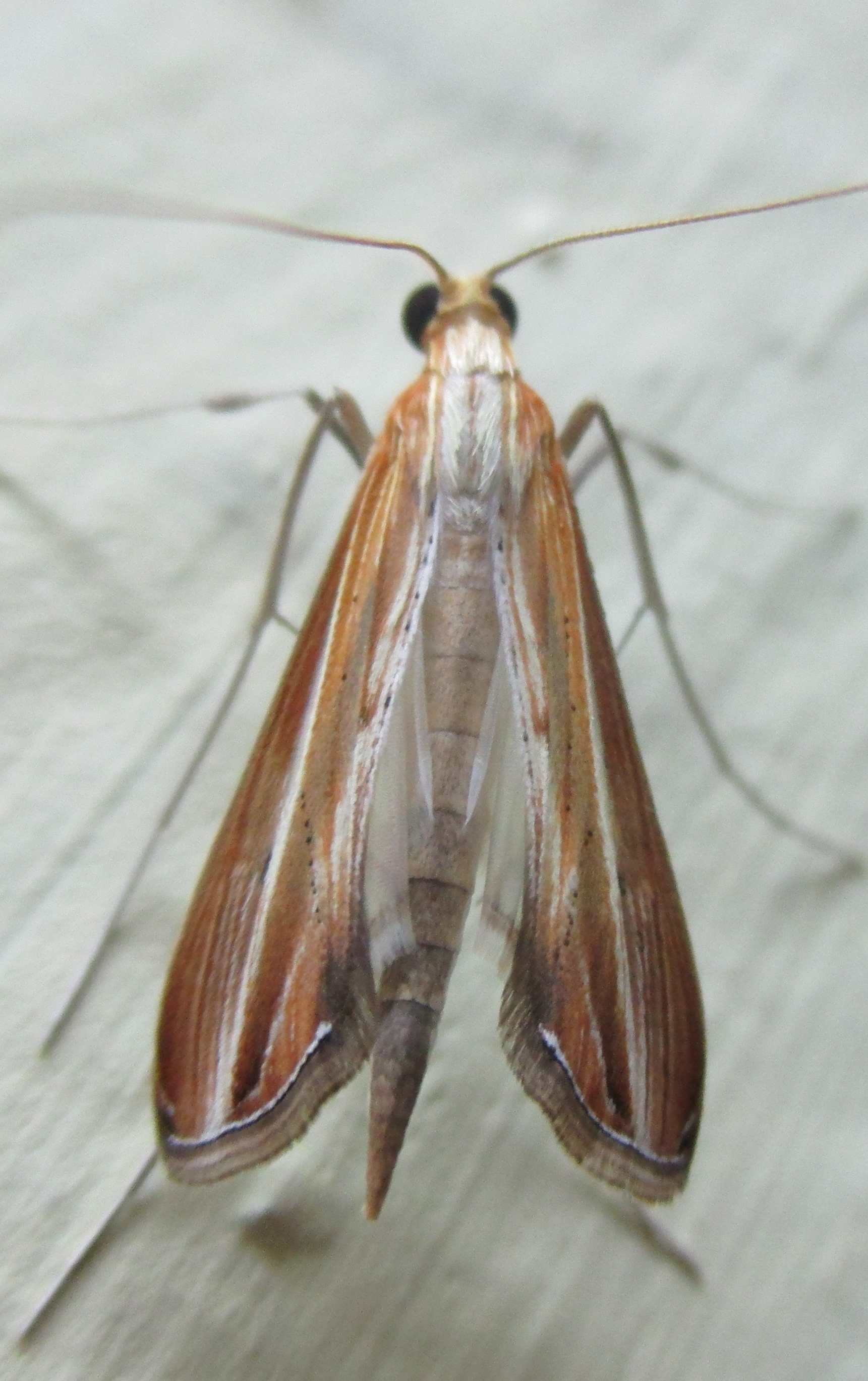

Scientific classification
- Domain: Eukaryota
- Kingdom: Animalia
- Phylum: Arthropoda
- Class: Insecta
- Order: Lepidoptera
- Family: Crambidae
- Genus: Euclasta
- Species: E. vitralis

Binomial name
- Euclasta vitralis Maes, 1997

= Euclasta vitralis =

Species of moth

Euclasta vitralis is a moth in the family Crambidae. It was described by Koen V. N. Maes in 1997. It is found in Nepal and Sri Lanka.
