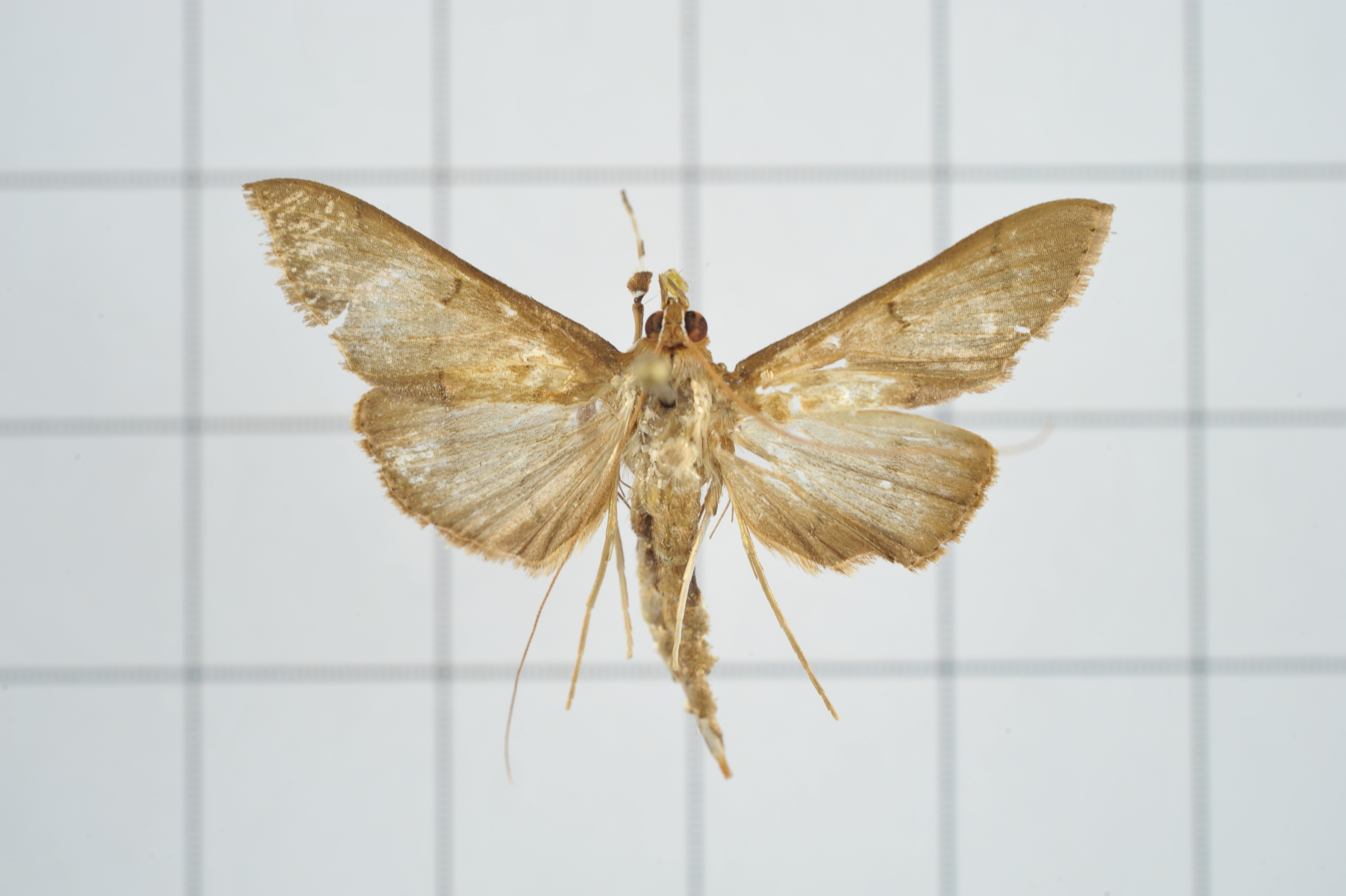

Scientific classification
- Kingdom: Animalia
- Phylum: Arthropoda
- Class: Insecta
- Order: Lepidoptera
- Family: Crambidae
- Subfamily: Spilomelinae
- Genus: Tetridia; Warren, 1890
- Species: T. caletoralis

Binomial name
- Tetridia caletoralis (Walker, 1859)

Synonyms
- Botys caletoralis Walker, 1859; Tetridia caletoralis; Tetridia interrupta Rothschild, 1915; Tetridia murinalis Swinhoe, 1906; Botys vinacealis Moore, 1877; Tetridia vinacealis (Moore, 1877)

= Tetridia =

Genus of moths

Tetridia is a monotypic moth genus of the family Crambidae described by William Warren in 1890. Its single species, Tetridia caletoralis, was described by Francis Walker in 1859. It is found in China, northern India, Sri Lanka, Myanmar, Malaysia, Papua New Guinea, Japan, Taiwan and Australia, where it has been recorded from Queensland.

== Subspecies ==
- Tetridia caletoralis caletoralis
- Tetridia caletoralis interrupta (Rothschild, 1915) (Papua New Guinea)
