= Chilochroma =

Scientific classification
- Domain: Eukaryota
- Kingdom: Animalia
- Phylum: Arthropoda
- Class: Insecta
- Order: Lepidoptera
- Family: Crambidae
- Subfamily: Pyraustinae
- Genus: Chilochroma; Amsel, 1956

Genus of moths

Chilochroma is a genus of moths of the family Crambidae.

== Species ==
- Chilochroma albicostalis (Hampson, 1913)
- Chilochroma interlinealis (Dyar, 1917)
- Chilochroma tucumana Munroe, 1964
- Chilochroma yucatana Munroe, 1964
