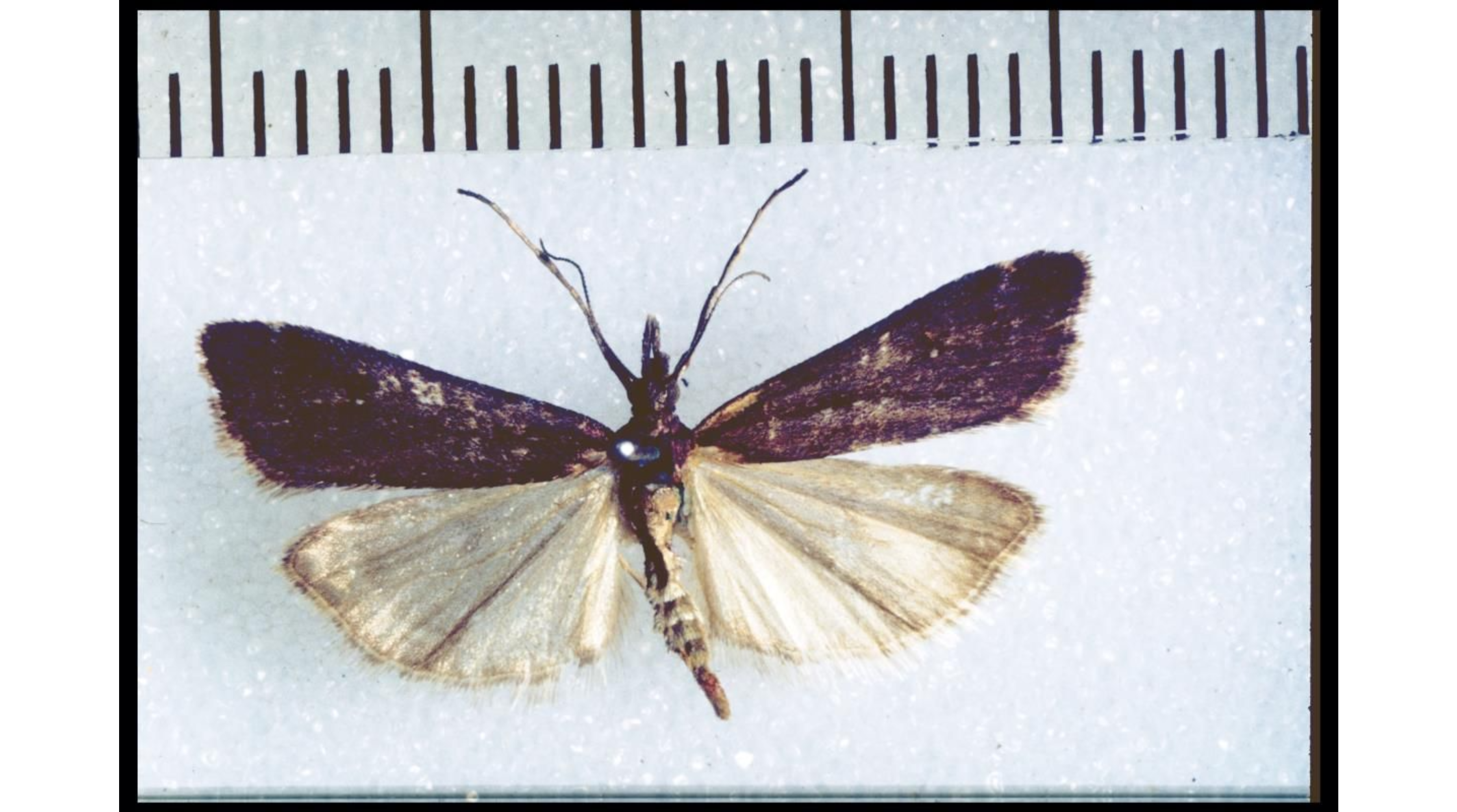
- Male holotype

Scientific classification
- Kingdom: Animalia
- Phylum: Arthropoda
- Class: Insecta
- Order: Lepidoptera
- Family: Crambidae
- Genus: Scoparia
- Species: S. parca

Binomial name
- Scoparia parca Philpott, 1928

= Scoparia parca =

Species of moth

Scoparia parca is a species of moth in the family Crambidae. It is endemic to New Zealand.

== Taxonomy ==
This species was described by Alfred Philpott in 1928. However the placement of this species within the genus Scoparia is in doubt. As a result, this species has also been referred to as Scoparia (s.l.) parca.

== Description ==
The wingspan is 19–24 mm. The forewings are greyish-fuscous. The first line is very obscure or absent, margined by dark posteriorly. The second line is also very obscure. It is whitish. The veins are outlined in black and there is a subterminal series of black spots. The hindwings are pale whitish-grey. Adults have been recorded on wing in November.
