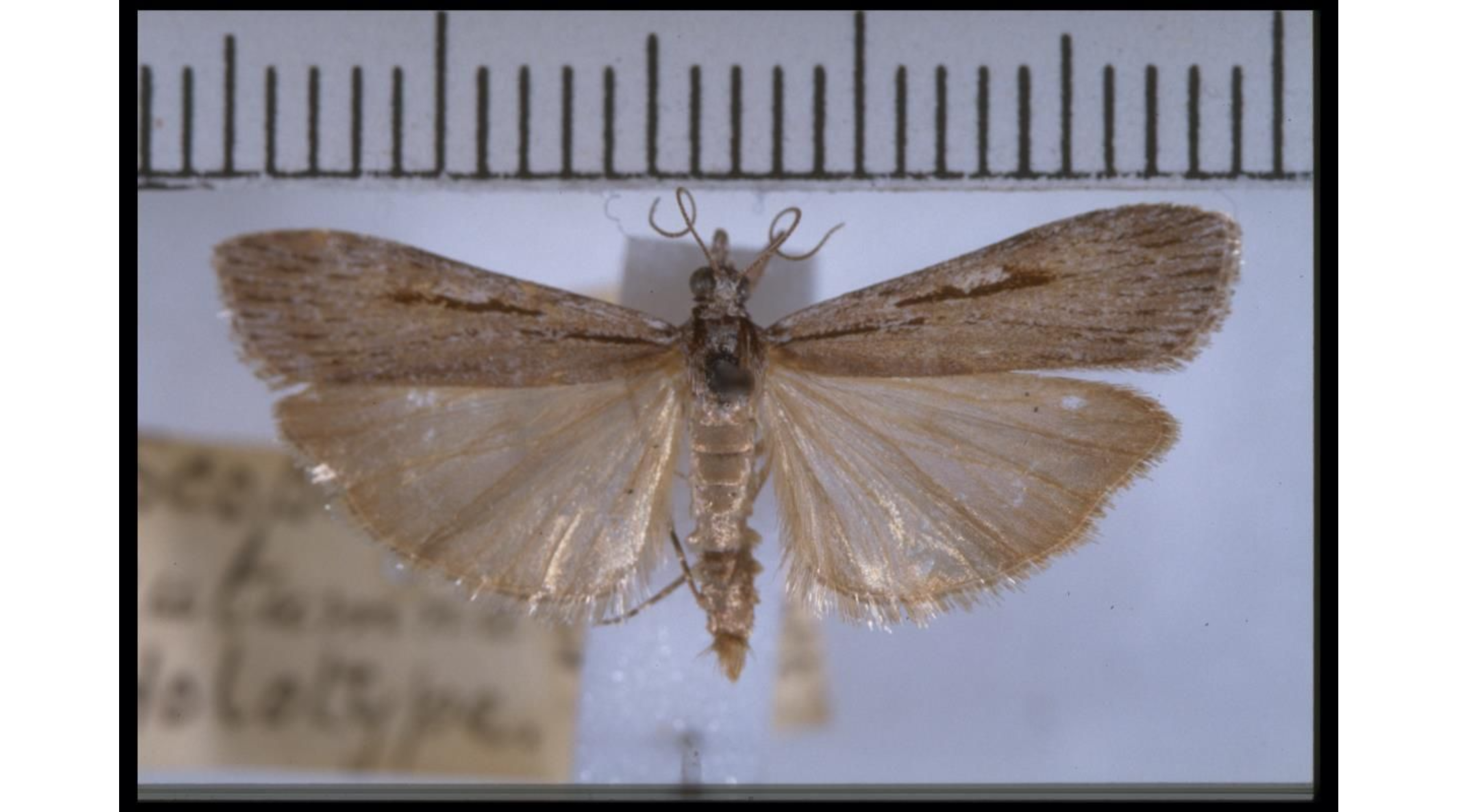
- Male holotype

Scientific classification
- Kingdom: Animalia
- Phylum: Arthropoda
- Class: Insecta
- Order: Lepidoptera
- Family: Crambidae
- Genus: Scoparia
- Species: S. autumna

Binomial name
- Scoparia autumna Philpott, 1927

= Scoparia autumna =

Species of moth

Scoparia autumna is a moth of the family Crambidae. It is endemic to New Zealand.

== Taxonomy ==
This species was described by Alfred Philpott in 1927. However the placement of this species within the genus Scoparia is in doubt. As a result, this species has also been referred to as Scoparia (s.l.) autumna.

== Description ==
The wingspan is 25–27 mm. The forewings are grey mixed with white and with dark chocolate brown markings. The hindwings are ochreous-grey, tinged with fuscous around the apex and termen. Adults have been recorded on wing in April and May.
