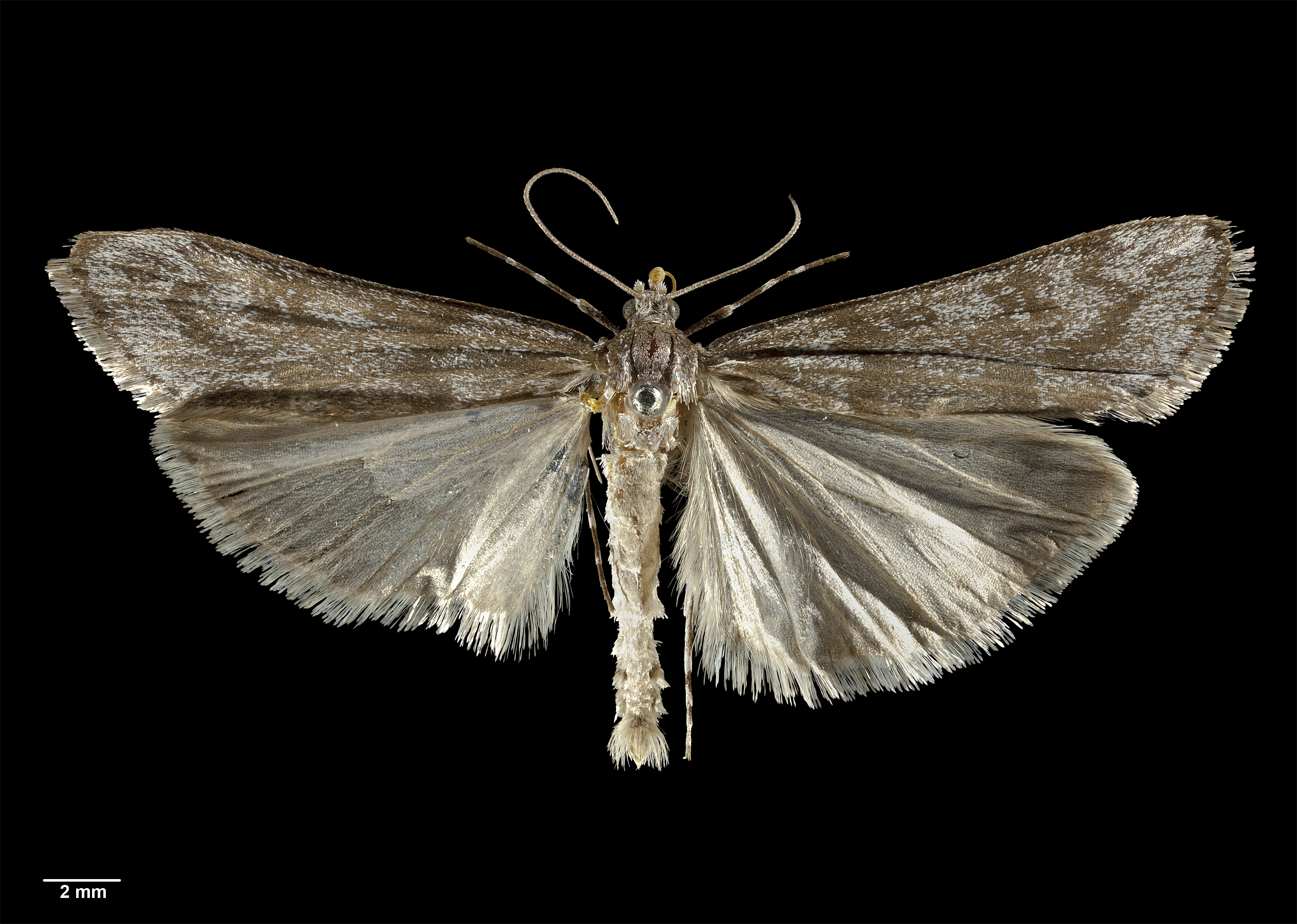

Scientific classification
- Kingdom: Animalia
- Phylum: Arthropoda
- Class: Insecta
- Order: Lepidoptera
- Family: Crambidae
- Genus: Scoparia
- Species: S. contexta

Binomial name
- Scoparia contexta Philpott, 1931

= Scoparia contexta =

Species of moth

Scoparia contexta is a species of moth in the family Crambidae. It is endemic to New Zealand.

== Taxonomy ==
It was described by Alfred Philpott in 1931. However the placement of this species within the genus Scoparia is in doubt. As a result, this species has also been referred to as Scoparia (s.l.) contexta.

== Description ==
The wingspan is 29–32 mm. The forewings are bluish white with dull fuscous markings. The hindwings are ochreous grey, tinged with fuscous around the termen. Adults have been recorded on wing in January.
