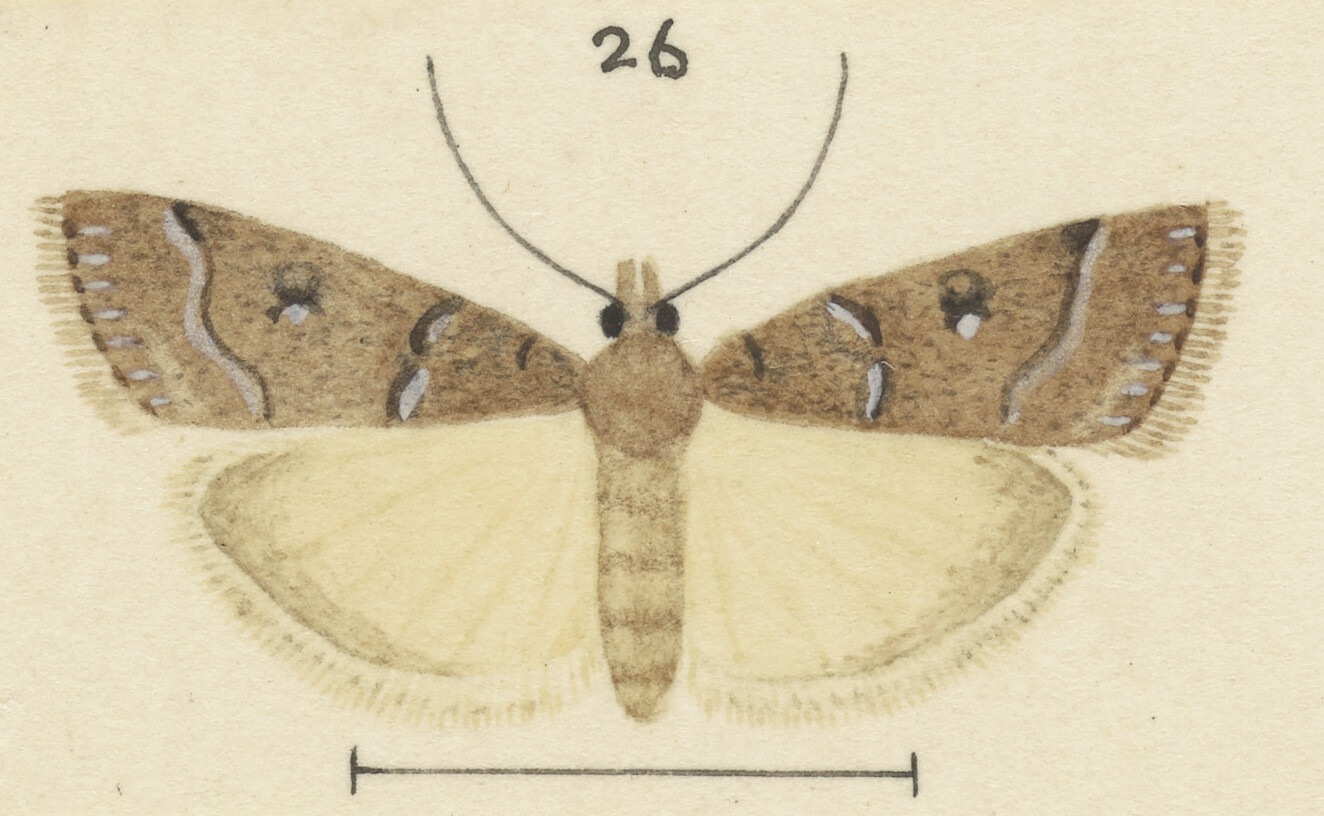
- Illustration of female

Scientific classification
- Kingdom: Animalia
- Phylum: Arthropoda
- Class: Insecta
- Order: Lepidoptera
- Family: Crambidae
- Genus: Scoparia
- Species: S. sinuata

Binomial name
- Scoparia sinuata Philpott, 1930

= Scoparia sinuata =

Species of moth

Scoparia sinuata is a species of moth in the family Crambidae. It is endemic to New Zealand.

== Taxonomy ==
This species was described by Alfred Philpott in 1930. However the placement of this species within the genus Scoparia is in doubt. As a result, this species has also been referred to as Scoparia (s.l.) sinuata.

== Description ==
The wingspan is 18–19 mm. The forewings are pale brown. The hindwings are very pale ochreous. Adults have been recorded on wing in February.
