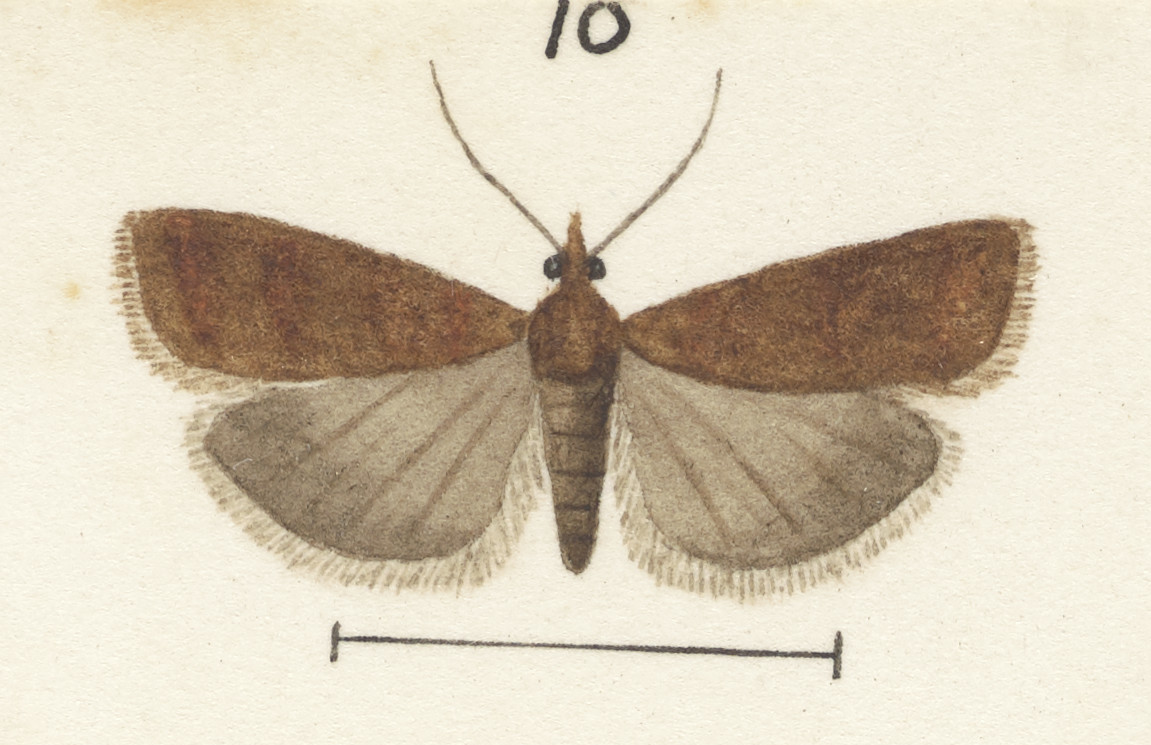

Conservation status
- Data Deficit (NZ TCS)

Scientific classification
- Kingdom: Animalia
- Phylum: Arthropoda
- Clade: Pancrustacea
- Class: Insecta
- Order: Lepidoptera
- Family: Crambidae
- Genus: Scoparia
- Species: S. parachalca

Binomial name
- Scoparia parachalca Meyrick, 1901

= Scoparia parachalca =

Species of moth

Scoparia parachalca is a moth in the family Crambidae. It was described by Edward Meyrick in 1901. It is endemic to New Zealand. In 2025 this species was classified by the Department of Conservation as "data deficient" under the New Zealand Threat Classification System and is probably extinct.

The wingspan is about 17 mm. The forewings are dark fuscous, with a few fine whitish scales. The subbasal, first and second lines are indicated by broad golden-bronzy suffusion and the terminal area is suffused with golden-bronzy. The hindwings are dark fuscous, but darker posteriorly. Adults have been recorded on wing in December.
