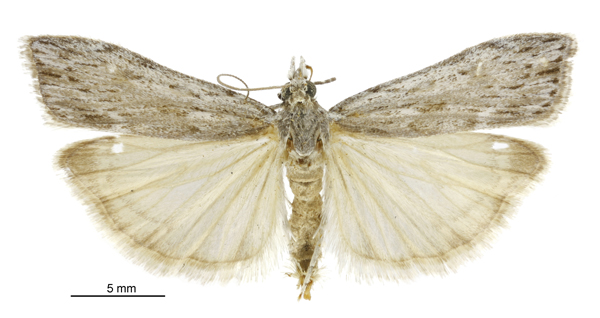
- Male

Scientific classification
- Kingdom: Animalia
- Phylum: Arthropoda
- Class: Insecta
- Order: Lepidoptera
- Family: Crambidae
- Genus: Scoparia
- Species: S. harpalea

Binomial name
- Scoparia harpalea (Meyrick, 1884)

Synonyms
- Xeroscopa harpalea Meyrick, 1884; Scoparia harpalaea (Meyrick, 1884)

= Scoparia harpalea =

Species of moth

Scoparia harpalea is a moth in the family Crambidae. It is endemic to New Zealand.

== Taxonomy ==
This species was named by Edward Meyrick in 1884 as Xeroscopa harpalea. Meyrick gave a description of this species in 1885. In 1913 Meyrick revised the genus of the species to Scoparia, and in 1928 George Vernon Hudson agreed with this revision. John S. Dugdale summarised this taxonomy in his 1988 publication but misspelt the epithet of this species as harpalaea. The wing patterns and male genitalia of holotypes of this species and Scoparia limatula have been examined and have been found to be identical.

== Description ==
The wingspan is about 24 mm. The forewings are white, irrorated with ochreous-grey. The veins are marked with blackish. The hindwings are very pale greyish-ochreous, the postmedian line and apex are grey. Adults have been recorded on wing in January.
