= Scoparia limatula =

Scientific classification
- Kingdom: Animalia
- Phylum: Arthropoda
- Class: Insecta
- Order: Lepidoptera
- Family: Crambidae
- Genus: Scoparia
- Species: S. limatula

Binomial name
- Scoparia limatula Philpott, 1930

Species of moth

Scoparia limatula is a species of moth in the family Crambidae. It is endemic in New Zealand.

== Taxonomy ==
It was described by Alfred Philpott in 1930. However the placement of this species within the genus Scoparia is in doubt. As a result, this species has also been referred to as Scoparia (s.l.) limatula. The wing patterns and male genitalia of holotypes of this species and Scoparia harpalea have been examined and have been found to be identical.

== Description ==
The wingspan is about 26 mm. The forewings are white with grey and fuscous scales. The hindwings are brassy-ochreous. Adults have been recorded on wing in January and February.
