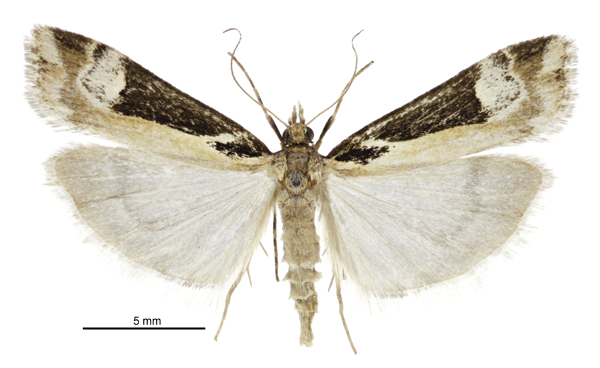
- Female
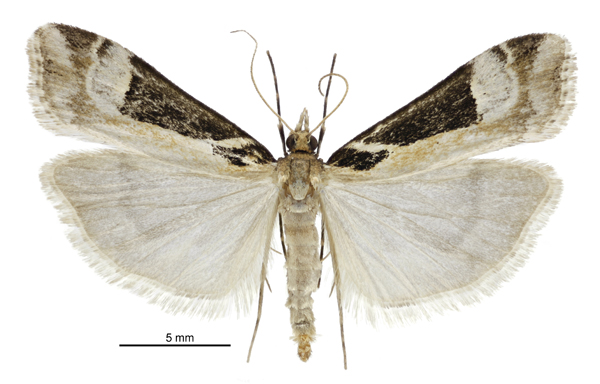
- Male

Scientific classification
- Kingdom: Animalia
- Phylum: Arthropoda
- Class: Insecta
- Order: Lepidoptera
- Family: Crambidae
- Genus: Scoparia
- Species: S. trapezophora

Binomial name
- Scoparia trapezophora Meyrick, 1884

= Scoparia trapezophora =

Species of moth

Scoparia trapezophora is a species of moth in the family Crambidae. It is endemic in New Zealand.

== Taxonomy ==
This species was named by Edward Meyrick in 1884. Meyrick gave a description of the species in 1885. However the placement of this species within the genus Scoparia is in doubt. As a result, this species has also been referred to as Scoparia (s.l.) trapezophora.

== Description ==
The wingspan is about 21 mm. The forewings are pale whitish-ochreous, with an oblong blackish spot from the base of the costa, reaching more than half across wing. There is a large sharply defined blackish blotch, extending along the costa, reaching only half across the wing. The inner margin is suffused with whitish. The second line is white and dark-margined and the terminal area is irrorated with dark fuscous, especially towards the costa. The subterminal line is cloudy whitish. The hindwings are grey-whitish. The postmedian line and hindmargin are somewhat darker. Adults have been recorded on wing in January.
