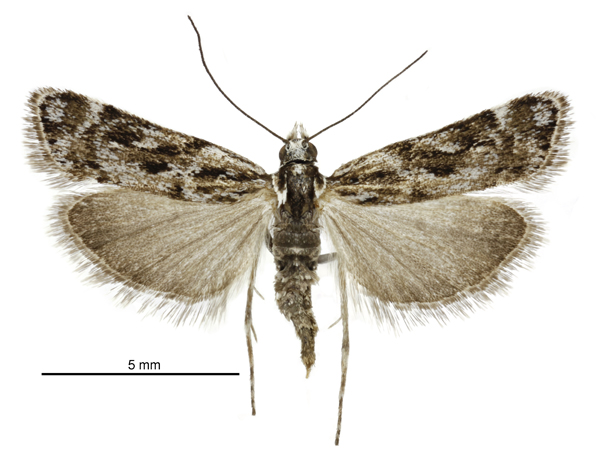
- Female
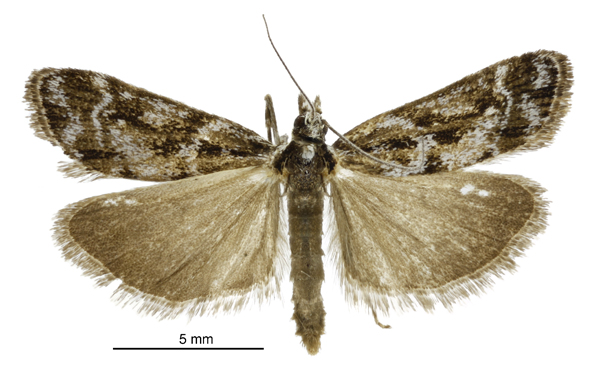
- Male

Scientific classification
- Kingdom: Animalia
- Phylum: Arthropoda
- Class: Insecta
- Order: Lepidoptera
- Family: Crambidae
- Genus: Scoparia
- Species: S. gracilis

Binomial name
- Scoparia gracilis Philpott, 1924

= Scoparia gracilis =

Species of moth

Scoparia gracilis is a moth in the family Crambidae. It is endemic to New Zealand.

== Taxonomy ==
It was described by Alfred Philpott in 1924. However the placement of this species within the genus Scoparia is in doubt. As a result, this species has also been referred to as Scoparia (s.l.) gracilis.

== Description ==
The wingspan is 16–19 mm. The forewings are pale-brownish, irrorated with black and white and with white lines, as well as a white-margined black band at the base. The hindwings are greyish-fuscous. Adults have been recorded on wing in December and January.
