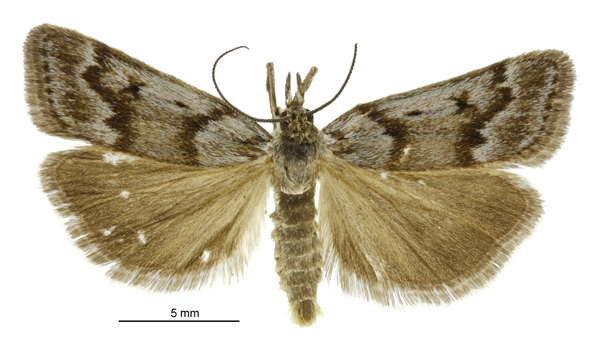
- Male
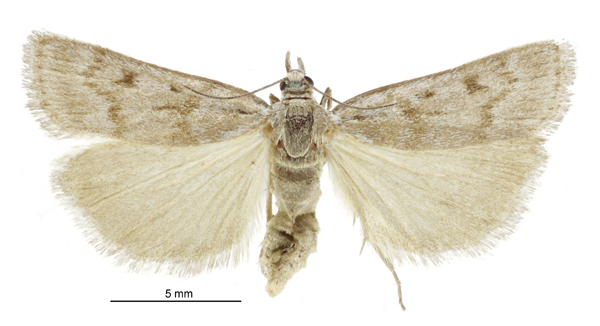
- Female

Scientific classification
- Kingdom: Animalia
- Phylum: Arthropoda
- Class: Insecta
- Order: Lepidoptera
- Family: Crambidae
- Genus: Scoparia
- Species: S. pura

Binomial name
- Scoparia pura Philpott, 1924

= Scoparia pura =

Species of moth

Scoparia pura is a species of moth in the family Crambidae. It is endemic to New Zealand.

== Taxonomy ==
It was described by Alfred Philpott in 1924. However the placement of this species within the genus Scoparia is in doubt. As a result, this species has also been referred to as Scoparia (s.l.) pura.

== Description ==
The wingspan is 21–22 mm. The forewings are grey, suffused with white on the basal area and beneath the costa. There is an interrupted blackish line at the base and the first line is indicated by a brownish-black posterior margin. The second line is white, margined by black anteriorly. There is a marginal series of black dots, preceded by an obscure white shade. The hindwings are greyish-fuscous, but darker apically. Adults have been recorded on wing in January.
