= Scoparia ganevi =

Scientific classification
- Kingdom: Animalia
- Phylum: Arthropoda
- Class: Insecta
- Order: Lepidoptera
- Family: Crambidae
- Genus: Scoparia
- Species: S. ganevi

Binomial name
- Scoparia ganevi Leraut, 1985

Synonyms
- Scoparia balcanica Leraut, 1984

Species of moth

Scoparia ganevi is a species of moth in the family Crambidae. It is known from Bulgaria and Greece.

== Taxonomy ==
The species was described by Patrice J. A. Leraut in 1985. It belongs to the genus Scoparia, within the subfamily Scopariinae, a group of small moths commonly referred to as grass moths. Species in this genus are often difficult to distinguish based solely on external appearance and frequently require examination of genitalia for reliable identification.

== Description ==
Detailed morphological descriptions specific to Scoparia ganevi, including wingspan and diagnostic wing markings, are not widely available in accessible literature. However, like other members of the genus Scoparia, it is a small moth with cryptic forewing patterning in shades of grey, brown, and white, which provides camouflage against natural substrates such as bark, stones, or dry vegetation.

== Distribution ==
Scoparia ganevi has been recorded in Bulgaria and Greece. These records place the species within the Balkan Peninsula. Its full distribution range remains poorly documented, and it may occur in neighbouring regions where suitable habitat exists but has not yet been recorded.

== Habitat ==
Although no species-specific habitat data have been published for Scoparia ganevi, species of the genus Scoparia are generally associated with grasslands, open woodland, forest edges, and areas with low or sparse vegetation.

== Biology ==
The life history of Scoparia ganevi has not been studied in detail. In general, Scoparia species undergo complete metamorphosis, with larvae feeding on mosses, grasses, or plant detritus. Adults are nocturnal and are commonly attracted to artificial light sources. The flight period of S. ganevi has not been formally recorded.

== Conservation status ==
The species has not been evaluated for the IUCN Red List. Due to the limited number of published records, its population size, trends, and potential threats remain unknown.
