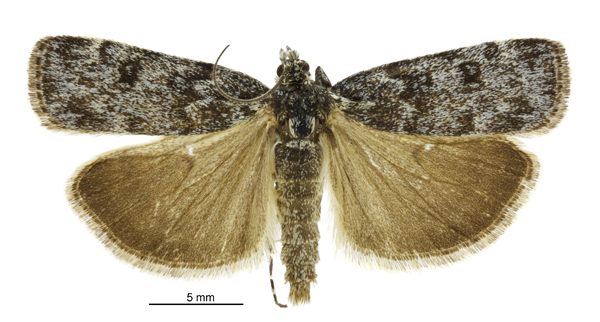
- Male

Scientific classification
- Kingdom: Animalia
- Phylum: Arthropoda
- Clade: Pancrustacea
- Class: Insecta
- Order: Lepidoptera
- Family: Crambidae
- Genus: Scoparia
- Species: S. caesia

Binomial name
- Scoparia caesia (Philpott, 1926)

Synonyms
- Orocrambus caesius Philpott, 1926; Scoparia caesius (Philpott, 1926)

= Scoparia caesia =

Species of moth

Scoparia caesia is a moth of the family Crambidae. It is endemic to New Zealand.

== Taxonomy ==
It was described by Alfred Philpott in 1926 as Orocrambus caesius. In 1975 David E. Gaskin excluded this species from the genus Orocambus and tentatively placed it within the genus Scoparia. However this placement is in doubt. As a result, this species has also been referred to as Scoparia (s.l.) caesia.

== Description ==
The wingspan is 25–27 mm. The forewings are fuscous-black, irrorated with white. There is an obscure blackish basal line and the first line is whitish, margined with blackish posteriorly. The second line is whitish, margined by blackish anteriorly. The hindwings are shining fuscous. Adults have been recorded on wing in January.

== Distribution ==
This species is found in New Zealand.
