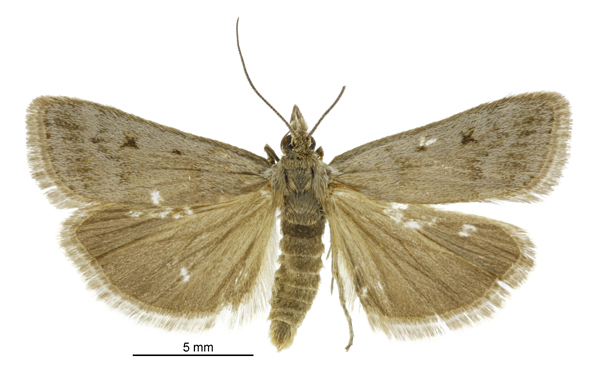
- Male

Scientific classification
- Kingdom: Animalia
- Phylum: Arthropoda
- Class: Insecta
- Order: Lepidoptera
- Family: Crambidae
- Genus: Scoparia
- Species: S. cinefacta

Binomial name
- Scoparia cinefacta Philpott, 1926

= Scoparia cinefacta =

Species of moth

Scoparia cinefacta is a species of moth in the family Crambidae. It is endemic to New Zealand.

== Taxonomy ==
This species was first described by Alfred Philpott in 1926. However the placement of this species within the genus Scoparia is in doubt. As a result, this species has also been referred to as Scoparia (s.l.) cinefacta.

== Description ==
The wingspan is 19–20 mm. The forewings are pale bluish-grey with an X-shaped fuscous-black reniform spot. The hindwings are fuscous-grey. Adults have been recorded on wing in January.
