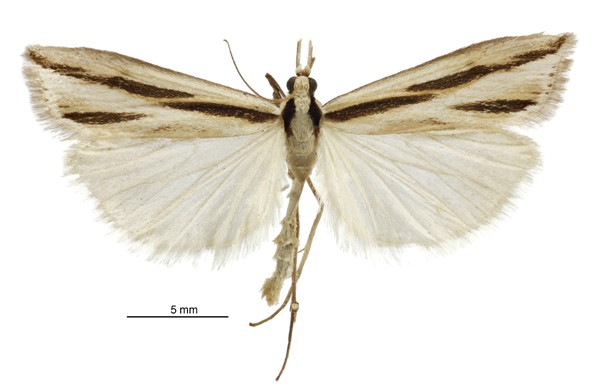
- Male

Scientific classification
- Kingdom: Animalia
- Phylum: Arthropoda
- Class: Insecta
- Order: Lepidoptera
- Family: Crambidae
- Genus: Scoparia
- Species: S. claranota

Binomial name
- Scoparia claranota Howes, 1946

= Scoparia claranota =

Species of moth

Scoparia claranota is a species of moth in the family Crambidae. It is endemic to New Zealand.

== Taxonomy ==
It was described by W. George Howes in 1946. However the placement of this species within the genus Scoparia is in doubt. As a result, this species has also been referred to as Scoparia (s.l.) claranota.

== Description ==
The wingspan is about 39 mm. Adults have been recorded on wing in December.
