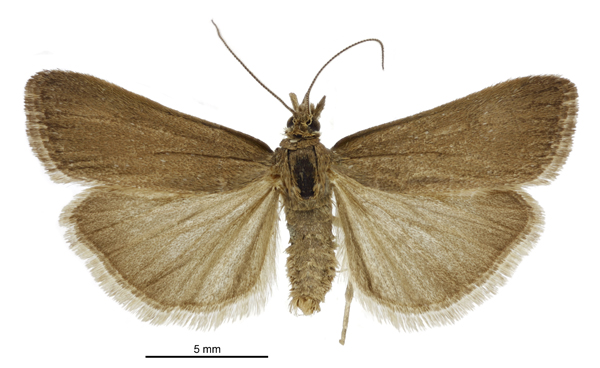
- Male

Scientific classification
- Kingdom: Animalia
- Phylum: Arthropoda
- Class: Insecta
- Order: Lepidoptera
- Family: Crambidae
- Genus: Scoparia
- Species: S. autochroa

Binomial name
- Scoparia autochroa Meyrick, 1907

= Scoparia autochroa =

Species of moth

Scoparia autochroa is a moth of the family Crambidae. It was described by Edward Meyrick in 1907. This species is endemic to New Zealand.

The wingspan is 21–23 mm. The forewings are brown sprinkled with dark fuscous. The hindwings are fuscous. Adults have been recorded on wing in November.
