= Scoparia fragosa =

Scientific classification
- Kingdom: Animalia
- Phylum: Arthropoda
- Class: Insecta
- Order: Lepidoptera
- Family: Crambidae
- Genus: Scoparia
- Species: S. fragosa

Binomial name
- Scoparia fragosa Meyrick, 1910

Species of moth

Scoparia fragosa is a moth in the family Crambidae. It was described by Edward Meyrick in 1910. It is endemic to New Zealand, where it has been recorded from the Kermadec Islands.

The wingspan is about 13 mm. The forewings are fuscous, mixed with whitish and with scattered black scales. There is a blackish streak from the base of the costa to the disc. The lines are cloudy and white. The hindwings are grey-whitish.
