= List of moths of Australia (Geometridae) =

This is a list of the Australian moth species of the family Geometridae. It also acts as an index to the species articles and forms part of the full List of moths of Australia.

== Subfamily Archiearinae ==
- Acalyphes philorites Turner, 1926
- Dirce aesiodora Turner, 1922
- Dirce lunaris (Meyrick, 1890)
- Dirce oriplancta Turner, 1926
- Dirce solaris (Meyrick, 1890)

== Subfamily Ennominae ==
=== Abraxini ===
- Abraxas expectata Warren, 1902
- Abraxas flavimacula (Warren, 1896)
- Abraxas sporocrossa Turner, 1922

=== Baptini ===
- Borbacha euchrysa (Lower, 1894)
- Bulonga distans Warren, 1896
- Eurychoria fictilis (Turner, 1919)
- Eurychoria gerasphora (Turner, 1947)
- Synegia aurantiaca (Warren, 1897)

=== Boarmiini ===
- Amblychia angeronaria Guenée, 1857
- Amblychia subrubida (Warren, 1896)
- Amraica debrunnescens (L.B. Prout, 1926)
- Apheloceros dasciodes Turner, 1947
- Ateloptila confusa Warren, 1900
- Bracca matutinata (Walker, 1862)
- Bracca ribbei (Pagenstecher, 1886)
- Bracca rosenbergi (Pagenstecher, 1886)
- Bracca rotundata (Butler, 1877)
- Catoria camelaria (Guenée, 1857)
- Catoria delectaria (Walker, 1866)
- Catoria hemiprosopa (Turner, 1904)
- Chorodna strixaria (Guenée, 1857)
- Cleora costiplaga (D.S. Fletcher, 1953)
- Cleora decisaria (Walker, 1866)
- Cleora displicata (Walker, 1860)
- Cleora eugraphica (Turner, 1917)
- Cleora godeffroyi (Butler, 1886)
- Cleora goldfinchi L.B. Prout, 1937
- Cleora illustraria (Walker, 1863)
- Cleora injectaria (Walker, 1860)
- Cleora lacteata (Warren, 1897)
- Cleora perfumosa (Warren, 1896)
- Cleora perlepidaria (Warren, 1900)
- Cleora repetita (Butler, 1882)
- Cleora rostrata (D.S. Fletcher, 1953)
- Cleora sabulata (D.S. Fletcher, 1953)
- Cleora tenebrata (D.S. Fletcher, 1953)
- Craspedosis leucosticta Warren, 1896
- Didymoctenia exsuperata (Walker, 1860)
- Ectropis aganopa (Meyrick, 1892)
- Ectropis argalea Meyrick, 1892
- Ectropis bhurmitra (Walker, 1860)
- Ectropis bispinaria (Guenée, 1857)
- Ectropis calida Goldfinch, 1944
- Ectropis despicata (Walker, 1860)
- Ectropis excursaria (Guenée, 1857)
- Ectropis fractaria (Guenée, 1857)
- Ectropis gravis (Turner, 1947)
- Ectropis lignea Goldfinch, 1944
- Ectropis mniara Turner, 1917
- Ectropis petrozona (Lower, 1900)
- Euphronarcha epiphloea (Turner, 1926)
- Euphronarcha leptodesma (Meyrick, 1892)
- Euphronarcha luxaria (Guenée, 1857)
- Gastrinodes argoplaca (Meyrick, 1892)
- Gastrinodes bitaeniaria (Le Guillou, 1841)
- Heterogena exitela Turner, 1947
- Hyposidra incomptaria (Walker, 1866)
- Hyposidra janiaria Guenée, 1857
- Hyposidra talaca (Walker, 1860)
- Iulotrichia semiumbrata (Warren, 1896)
- Krananda extranotata L.B. Prout, 1926
- Lipogya capnota (Meyrick, 1892)
- Lipogya eutheta (Turner, 1917)
- Lipogya exprimataria (Walker, 1863)
- Lipogya leucoprosopa (Turner, 1947)
- Milionia aetheria (Turner, 1947)
- Milionia queenslandica Jordan & Rothschild, 1895
- Neogyne elongata Warren, 1898
- Neogyne mochlosema (Turner, 1917)
- Pachyplocia atmocyma (Turner, 1917)
- Pachyplocia griseata Warren, 1896
- Pachyplocia loxocyma (Turner, 1917)
- Pachyplocia prionodes (Turner, 1947)
- Paradromulia ambigua Warren, 1896
- Phelotis cognata (Walker, 1860)
- Pholodes sinistraria (Guenée, 1857)
- Pleurolopha nebridota Turner, 1904
- Polyacme dissimilis (Warren, 1897)
- Polyacme subpulchra (Warren, 1897)
- Praesos mariana (White, 1852)
- Psilalcis isombra (Meyrick, 1892)
- Psilosticha absorpta (Walker, 1860)
- Psilosticha attacta (Walker, 1860)
- Psilosticha loxoschema (Turner, 1947)
- Psilosticha mactaria (Guenée, 1857)
- Psilosticha oresitropha Turner, 1947
- Psilosticha pristis (Meyrick, 1892)
- Racotis maculata (T.P. Lucas, 1890)
- Scioglyptis canescaria (Guenée, 1857)
- Scioglyptis chionomera (Lower, 1893)
- Scioglyptis heterogyna (Lower, 1893)
- Scioglyptis loxographa (Turner, 1917)
- Scioglyptis lyciaria (Guenée, 1857)
- Scioglyptis violescens (Warren, 1898)
- Symmetroctena fumosa Warren, 1895
- Syneora acclinis (Turner, 1947)
- Syneora acrotypa (Turner, 1917)
- Syneora adelphodes (Meyrick, 1892)
- Syneora amphiclina (Meyrick, 1892)
- Syneora cheleuta (Meyrick, 1892)
- Syneora cymatomita (Turner, 1947)
- Syneora emmelodes (Turner, 1904)
- Syneora euboliaria (Walker, 1860)
- Syneora excursaria (Walker, 1863)
- Syneora fractata (Walker, 1862)
- Syneora gypsochroa (Turner, 1947)
- Syneora hemeropa (Meyrick, 1892)
- Syneora leucanthes (Turner, 1947)
- Syneora lithina (Warren, 1897)
- Syneora mesochra (Turner, 1947)
- Syneora mundifera (Walker, 1860)
- Syneora nigrilinea Goldfinch, 1944
- Syneora odontosticha (Turner, 1947)
- Syneora praecisa (Turner, 1917)
- Syneora silicaria (Guenée, 1857)
- Syneora strixata (Walker, 1862)
- Thallogama aellographa (Turner, 1947)
- Thallogama corticola (Goldfinch, 1944)
- Thallogama destinataria (Guenée, 1857)
- Thallogama nigraria (R. Felder & Rogenhofer, 1875)
- Thallogama pansticta (Turner, 1947)
- Zermizinga sinuata (Warren, 1897)

The following species belong to the tribe Boarmiini, but have not been assigned to a genus yet. Given here is the original name given to the species when it was first described:

- Aspilates pallidiscaria Walker, 1863
- Boarmia atactopa Turner, 1947
- Boarmia catephes Turner, 1947
- Boarmia conspersa Turner, 1947
- Boarmia crimnodes Turner, 1917
- Boarmia driophila Goldfinch, 1944
- Boarmia epiconia Turner, 1926
- Boarmia odontocrossa Turner, 1947
- Boarmia panconita Turner, 1917
- Boarmia phloeopa Turner, 1947
- Boarmia phricomita Turner, 1947
- Boarmia pissinopa Turner, 1922
- Boarmia platyleuca Turner, 1947
- Boarmia polysticta Turner, 1947
- Boarmia proschora Turner, 1926
- Boarmia suasaria Guenée, 1857
- Boarmia taeniota Turner, 1917
- Boarmia zaloschema Turner, 1917
- Cleora nesiotis Turner, 1926
- Diastictis cremnodes Lower, 1893
- Diastictis mesombra Lower, 1893
- Ectropis fragilis Turner, 1947
- Ectropis hieroglyphica Lower, 1900
- Ectropis macariata Warren, 1897
- Ectropis plectroneura Lower, 1900
- Scioglyptis lithinopa Meyrick, 1892
- Selidosema agoraea Meyrick, 1892
- Selidosema leucoplecta Meyrick, 1892
- Selidosema symmorpha Turner, 1904
- Selidosema thermaea Meyrick, 1892
- Selidosema zygophora Lower, 1893
- Tephrosia curtaria Walker, 1866
- Tephrosia desumpta Walker, 1860
- Tephrosia exesaria Guenée, 1857
- Tephrosia externaria Walker, 1866

=== Caberini ===
- Casbia adoxa Turner, 1947
- Casbia albinotata Warren, 1903
- Casbia aviata (Walker, 1861)
- Casbia calliorma Turner, 1919
- Casbia catharodes (Turner, 1904)
- Casbia celidosema Turner, 1947
- Casbia coniodes Turner, 1947
- Casbia crataea Turner, 1939
- Casbia cremnias (Meyrick, 1892)
- Casbia didymosticta Turner, 1947
- Casbia eremias (Meyrick, 1892)
- Casbia eutactopis Turner, 1947
- Casbia farinalis (Rosenstock, 1885)
- Casbia fasciata (Warren, 1896)
- Casbia glaucochroa (Turner, 1906)
- Casbia impressaria (Walker, 1861)
- Casbia leptorrhoda Turner, 1947
- Casbia lithodora (Meyrick, 1892)
- Casbia melanops Rosenstock, 1885
- Casbia ochthadia (Meyrick, 1892)
- Casbia oenias (Meyrick, 1892)
- Casbia pallens Turner, 1947
- Casbia plinthodes Turner, 1947
- Casbia rectaria Walker, 1866
- Casbia rhodoptila Turner, 1919
- Casbia rhodosceles Turner, 1939
- Casbia scardamiata Warren, 1898
- Casbia spodochroa (Turner, 1947)
- Casbia synempora Turner, 1919
- Casbia tanaoctena Turner, 1947
- Hyperythra rubricata Warren, 1898
- Laophila icasta (Turner, 1919)
- Laophila isocyma (Meyrick, 1892)
- Laophila modesta Swinhoe, 1902
- Laophila odontocrossa (Turner, 1906)
- Laophila sabulicolor (Turner, 1919)
- Laophila sciara (Turner, 1947)
- Laophila spodina (Meyrick, 1892)
- Parametrodes dispar Warren, 1897
- Petelia medardaria Herrich-Schäffer, 1856
- Polycrasta cinereomarginata (Pagenstecher, 1888)
- Rhinodia rostraria Guenée, 1857
- Rhinodia undiferaria (Walker, 1866)

=== Cassymini ===
- Cassephyra plenimargo (Warren, 1903)
- Heterostegane insulata Warren, 1898
- Iridobapta argostola Turner, 1919

=== Eutoeini ===
- Luxiaria ochrophara (Turner, 1919)
- Nadagarodes duplicipuncta Warren, 1899
- Nadagarodes mysolata (Walker, 1866)
- Probithia obstataria (Walker, 1861)
- Probithia perichila (L.B. Prout, 1929)
- Zeheba spectabilis (Butler, 1877)

=== Gonodontini ===
- Gonodontis euctista (Turner, 1947)
- Gonodontis fenestrata (T.P. Lucas, 1900)
- Gonodontis luteola (Turner, 1904)
- Gonodontis orthotoma (Lower, 1894)
- Gonodontis stramenticea (Turner, 1947)
- Proboloptera embolias Meyrick, 1892

=== Hypochrosini ===
- Achrosis semifulva (Pagenstecher, 1886)
- Capasa incensata (Walker, 1863)
- Capasa recensata (L.B.Prout, 1925)
- Corymica pryeri (Butler, 1878)
- Ctimene flavannulata (Warren, 1899)

=== Lithinini ===
- Idiodes apicata Guenée, 1857
- Idiodes homophaea Turner, 1906
- Idiodes idiocrossa (Turner, 1947)
- Idiodes pellophanes (Turner, 1947)
- Idiodes prionosema Turner, 1919
- Idiodes rhacodes Turner, 1947
- Idiodes siculoides (Walker, 1860)
- Idiodes stictopleura Goldfinch, 1944
- Idiodes tenuicorpis L.B. Prout, 1916
- Nadagara irretracta Warren, 1899
- Nadagara xylotrema (Lower, 1903)
- Planolocha autoptis Meyrick, 1892
- Planolocha hyposema Turner, 1947
- Planolocha iogramma (Meyrick, 1897)
- Planolocha obliquata (T.P. Lucas, 1892)
- Urostola magica Meyrick, 1891

The following species belong to the tribe Lithinini, but have not been assigned to a genus yet. Given here is the original name given to the species when it was first described:

- Azelina biplaga Walker, 1869
- Diastictis goniota Lower, 1893
- Gynopteryx ada Butler, 1882
- Metrocampa celaenephes Turner, 1917
- Picrophylla rubea Turner, 1947

=== Macariini ===
- Discalma normata (Walker, 1861)
- Dissomorphia australiaria (Guenée, 1857)
- Godonela glareosa (Turner, 1917)
- Godonela goldiei (H. Druce, 1882)
- Godonela gratularia (Walker, 1861)
- Godonela hypomochla (Turner, 1917)
- Godonela margaritis (Meyrick, 1892)
- Godonela tessellata (Warren, 1899)
- Oxymacaria odontias (Lower, 1893)
- Paramelora ammophila (Turner, 1947)
- Paramelora lychnota (Lower, 1900)
- Paramelora zophodesma Lower, 1903
- Parosteodes fictiliaria (Guenée, 1857)

The following species belong to the tribe Macariini, but have not been assigned to a genus yet. Given here is the original name given to the species when it was first described:

- Aspilates clarissa Butler, 1886
- Selidosema penthearia Guenée, 1857

=== Nacophorini ===
- Amelora acontistica (Turner, 1947)
- Amelora adusta Turner, 1947
- Amelora amblopa Guest, 1887
- Amelora anepiscepta Turner, 1947
- Amelora arotraea Meyrick, 1892
- Amelora australis (Rosenstock, 1885)
- Amelora belemnophora Turner, 1947
- Amelora camptodes Turner, 1919
- Amelora catacris Meyrick, 1892
- Amelora ceraunia Turner, 1947
- Amelora conia Turner, 1947
- Amelora crenulata Turner, 1926
- Amelora cryphia Turner, 1919
- Amelora crypsigramma Lower, 1899
- Amelora demistis Guest, 1887
- Amelora fucosa Turner, 1919
- Amelora goniota Guest, 1887
- Amelora gonosemela (Lower, 1893)
- Amelora idiomorpha Lower, 1893
- Amelora leucaniata (Guenée, 1857)
- Amelora lithopepla Lower, 1918
- Amelora macarta Turner, 1919
- Amelora mesocapna Turner, 1919
- Amelora milvaria (Guenée, 1857)
- Amelora newmannaria (Guenée, 1857)
- Amelora oenobreches Turner, 1919
- Amelora oncerodes Turner, 1919
- Amelora oritropha Turner, 1919
- Amelora pachyspila Turner, 1919
- Amelora pentheres Turner, 1919
- Amelora perinipha (Lower, 1915)
- Amelora petrochroa (Lower, 1897)
- Amelora polychroa Lower, 1907
- Amelora sparsularia (Guenée, 1857)
- Amelora suffusa Turner, 1926
- Amelora synclera Turner, 1919
- Amelora syscia (Turner, 1919)
- Amelora thegalea Turner, 1947
- Amelora zophopasta Turner, 1919
- Amphiclasta lygaea Turner, 1906
- Amphicrossa adelosticha (Turner, 1926)
- Amphicrossa hemadelpha (Lower, 1897)
- Aphantes melanochorda (Turner, 1919)
- Aporoctena aprepes (Turner, 1904)
- Aporoctena scierodes Meyrick, 1892
- Archephanes zalosema Turner, 1926
- Argidava subviduata Walker, 1863
- Authaemon poliophara Turner, 1919
- Authaemon purpurea Goldfinch, 1944
- Authaemon stenonipha Turner, 1919
- Bradyctena trychnoptila (Turner, 1906)
- Capusa chionopleura Turner, 1926
- Capusa cuculloides (R. Felder, 1874)
- Capusa graodes Turner, 1919
- Capusa leptoneura (Turner, 1926)
- Capusa senilis Walker, 1857
- Capusa stenophara Turner, 1919
- Chlenias banksiaria (Le Guillou, 1841)
- Chlenias basichorda Turner, 1919
- Chlenias belophora (Turner, 1919)
- Chlenias cyclosticha Lower, 1915
- Chlenias gonosema Lower, 1893
- Chlenias inkata Tindale, 1961
- Chlenias macrochorda Turner, 1919
- Chlenias nodosus (Swinhoe, 1892)
- Chlenias ochrocrana Turner, 1947
- Chlenias pini Tindale, 1929
- Chlenias seminigra Rosenstock, 1885
- Chlenias serina Lower, 1900
- Chlenias stenosticha Turner, 1919
- Chlenias zonaea Guest, 1887
- Chlenomorpha lygdina (Turner, 1917)
- Chlenomorpha sciogramma Lower, 1918
- Chlenomorpha trisyneura (Lower, 1903)
- Ciampa arietaria (Guenée, 1857)
- Ciampa chordota (Meyrick, 1890)
- Ciampa heteromorpha (Lower, 1901)
- Ciampa melanostrepta (Lower, 1893)
- Conosara castanea Meyrick, 1892
- Conosara pammicta Turner, 1919
- Corula geometroides Walker, 1856
- Cryphaea xylina (Turner, 1917)
- Crypsiphila atmophanes Turner, 1947
- Cycloprorodes melanoxysta (Meyrick, 1892)
- Drymoptila temenitis Guest, 1887
- Dysbatus singularis Butler, 1886
- Dysbatus stenodesma (Lower, 1899)
- Epicompsa xanthocrossa Guest, 1887
- Fisera belidearia (R. Felder & Rogenhofer, 1875)
- Fisera bradymorpha Turner, 1919
- Fisera dictyodes (Lower, 1893)
- Fisera eribola (Guest, 1887)
- Fisera halurga Turner, 1919
- Fisera hypoleuca (Turner, 1919)
- Fisera nicholsoni Goldfinch, 1944
- Fisera perplexata Walker, 1860
- Fisera phricotypa Turner, 1919
- Gastrina cristaria Guenée, 1857
- Gastrinopa xylistis Lower, 1903
- Harpagocnema eremoplana Turner, 1915
- Hypsitropha euschema Turner, 1926
- Larophylla amimeta Turner, 1917
- Liometopa rectilinea Turner, 1947
- Lophosigna catasticta (Turner, 1904)
- Lophosticha idiograpta (Turner, 1947)
- Lophosticha psorallodes Lower, 1902
- Lophothalaina habrocosma (Lower, 1893)
- Loweria callisarca (Lower, 1903)
- Loweria capnosticta (Turner, 1919)
- Loweria eurypsamma (Lower, 1915)
- Loweria haplochroa (Lower, 1915)
- Loweria heteropa (Lower, 1901)
- Loweria melancroca (Turner, 1919)
- Loweria philocosma (Lower, 1915)
- Loweria platydesma (Lower, 1901)
- Loweria stenoscia (Lower, 1915)
- Loweria tephrochroa (Lower, 1903)
- Lychnographa agaura Turner, 1917
- Lychnographa heroica Turner, 1917
- Lyelliana dryophila Turner, 1917
- Lyelliana phaeochlora Turner, 1916
- Megazancla cinerea Goldfinch, 1944
- Melanodes anthracitaria Guenée, 1857
- Mictodoca callipolia (Turner, 1926)
- Mictodoca toxeuta Meyrick, 1892
- Middletonia hemichroma (Turner, 1947)
- Middletonia suavis Turner, 1947
- Mnesampela arida McQuillan, 1985
- Mnesampela athertonensis McQuillan, 1985
- Mnesampela comarcha Guest, 1887
- Mnesampela heliochrysa (Lower, 1893)
- Mnesampela kunama McQuillan, 1985
- Mnesampela lenaea Meyrick, 1892
- Mnesampela privata (Guenée, 1857)
- Mochlotona phasmatias Meyrick, 1892
- Neoteristis paraphanes Meyrick, 1892
- Niceteria macrocosma (Lower, 1899)
- Nisista galearia (Guenée, 1857)
- Nisista notodontaria Walker, 1860
- Nisista serrata (Walker, 1857)
- Nycterephes anthracica (Lower, 1905)
- Nycterephes coracopa Turner, 1906
- Palleopa innotata Walker, 1866
- Paralaea beggaria (Guenée, 1857)
- Paralaea ochrosoma (R. Felder & Rogenhofer, 1875)
- Paralaea polysticha (Goldfinch, 1944)
- Paralaea porphyrinaria (Guenée, 1857)
- Paurocoma coniopa Lower, 1918
- Paurocoma molybdina Lower, 1902
- Philolochma celaenochroa Turner, 1914
- Plesanemma altafucata McQuillan, 1984
- Plesanemma fucata (R. Felder & Rogenhofer, 1875)
- Plesiolaea maritima (Lower, 1897)
- Plesiolaea promacha (Meyrick, 1892)
- Prosotera metopora Turner, 1919
- Rhynchopsota delogramma Lower, 1903
- Rhynchopsota rhyncophora (Lower, 1893)
- Smyriodes aplectaria Guenée, 1857
- Smyriodes trigramma (Lower, 1892)
- Stibaroma aphronesa (Lower, 1902)
- Stibaroma melanotoxa Guest, 1887
- Synzeuxis penthina Turner, 1919
- Thalaina allochroa (Lower, 1902)
- Thalaina angulosa Walker, 1865
- Thalaina chionoptila (Turner, 1947)
- Thalaina clara Walker, 1855
- Thalaina inscripta Walker, 1855
- Thalaina kimba McQuillan, 1981
- Thalaina macfarlandi (Wilson, 1972)
- Thalaina paronycha (Lower, 1900)
- Thalaina selenaea (Doubleday, 1845)
- Thalaina tetraclada (Lower, 1900)
- Xylodryas leptoxantha (Turner, 1919)

The following species belong to the tribe Nacophorini, but have not been assigned to a genus yet. Given here is the original name given to the species when it was first described:

- Cymatophora aspera Walker, 1865

=== Plutodini ===
- Plutodes signifera Warren, 1896

=== Scardamiini ===
- Aplochlora pisochroa (Turner, 1906)
- Scardamia chrysolina Meyrick, 1892
- Scardamia ithyzona Turner, 1919
- Scardamia metallaria Guenée, 1857

=== Unplaced to tribe ===
- Clepsiphron calycopis Turner, 1922
- Coelocrossa drepanucha Turner, 1919
- Coelocrossa hypocrocea Turner, 1919
- Neritodes verrucata Guenée, 1857
- Peridelias aprosita Turner, 1919
- Picromorpha pyrrhopa (Lower, 1897)
- Picrophylla hyleora Turner, 1922
- Tessarotis rubrata Warren, 1903
- Xenomusa metallica T.P. Lucas, 1891
- Xenomusa monoda Meyrick, 1890

The following species belong to the subfamily Ennominae, but have not been assigned to a genus or tribe yet. Given here is the original name given to the species when it was first described:

- Boarmia australasiaria Boisduval, 1832
- Caberodes punctiferata Walker, 1863
- Chlenias ombrophora Lower, 1894
- Epione incaria Guenée, 1857
- Speranza fastidiata Walker, 1862
- Tephrosia infimaria Walker, 1863
- Xenomusa tetramera Lower, 1894

== Subfamily Geometrinae ==
- Aeolochroma acanthina (Meyrick, 1888)
- Aeolochroma hypochromaria (Guenée, 1857)
- Aeolochroma melaleucae (Goldfinch, 1929)
- Aeolochroma metarhodata (Walker, 1863)
- Aeolochroma mniaria (Goldfinch, 1929)
- Aeolochroma olivia (Goldfinch, 1943)
- Aeolochroma pammiges (Turner, 1941)
- Aeolochroma quadrilinea (T.P. Lucas, 1892)
- Aeolochroma rhodochlora (Goldfinch, 1929)
- Aeolochroma saturataria (Walker, 1866)
- Aeolochroma subrubescens (Warren, 1896)
- Aeolochroma turneri (T.P. Lucas, 1890)
- Aeolochroma unitaria (Walker, 1860)
- Aeolochroma viridicata (T.P. Lucas, 1890)
- Agathia distributa T.P. Lucas, 1891
- Agathia kuehni Warren, 1898
- Agathia lycaenaria (Kollar, 1848)
- Agathia ochrotypa Turner, 1922
- Agathia pisina Butler, 1887
- Agathia prasinaspis Meyrick, 1889
- Agathiopsis basipuncta Warren, 1896
- Agathiopsis maculata Warren, 1896
- Alloeopage cinerea (Warren, 1896)
- Anisozyga aphrias (Meyrick, 1889)
- Anisozyga callisticta (Turner, 1904)
- Anisozyga erotyla (Turner, 1910)
- Anisozyga erymnodes (Turner, 1910)
- Anisozyga fascinans (T.P. Lucas, 1894)
- Anisozyga goniota (Lower, 1894)
- Anisozyga insperata (Walker, 1861)
- Anisozyga leptocosma L.B. Prout, 1933
- Anisozyga lithocrossa (Meyrick, 1889)
- Anisozyga metaspila (Walker, 1861)
- Anisozyga pieroides (Walker, 1861)
- Anisozyga speciosa (T.P. Lucas, 1890)
- Anomogenes morphnopa Turner, 1932
- Apodasmia rufonigraria (Walker, 1862)
- Argyrocosma argosticta (Turner, 1904)
- Austroterpna idiographa Goldfinch, 1929
- Austroterpna paratorna (Meyrick, 1888)
- Berta chrysolineata Walker, 1863
- Cenochlora quieta (T.P. Lucas, 1892)
- Chloeres citrolimbaria (Guenée, 1857)
- Chloeres prasochroa Turner, 1931
- Chlorocoma asemanta (Meyrick, 1888)
- Chlorocoma assimilis (T.P. Lucas, 1888)
- Chlorocoma cadmaria (Guenée, 1857)
- Chlorocoma carenaria (Guenée, 1857)
- Chlorocoma cyclosema Turner, 1941
- Chlorocoma dichloraria (Guenée, 1857)
- Chlorocoma externa (Walker, 1861)
- Chlorocoma halochlora (Meyrick, 1888)
- Chlorocoma ipomopsis (Lower, 1892)
- Chlorocoma melocrossa (Meyrick, 1888)
- Chlorocoma monocyma (Meyrick, 1888)
- Chlorocoma neptunus (Butler, 1886)
- Chlorocoma paraphylla (Lower, 1902)
- Chlorocoma pediobates Turner, 1939
- Chlorocoma periphracta (Turner, 1904)
- Chlorocoma rhodocrossa (Turner, 1906)
- Chlorocoma rhodoloma Turner, 1910
- Chlorocoma rhodothrix Turner, 1922
- Chlorocoma stereota (Meyrick, 1888)
- Chlorocoma tachypora Turner, 1910
- Chlorocoma tetraspila (Lower, 1901)
- Chlorocoma vertumnaria (Guenée, 1857)
- Chlorodes boisduvalaria (Le Guillou, 1841)
- Chrysochloroma megaloptera (Lower, 1894)
- Comibaena connata (Warren, 1898)
- Comibaena inductaria (Guenée, 1857)
- Comibaena mariae (T.P. Lucas, 1888)
- Comostola cedilla L.B. Prout, 1934
- Comostola chlorargyra (Walker, 1861)
- Comostola haplophanes Turner, 1910
- Comostola iodioides (T.P. Lucas, 1891)
- Comostola laesaria (Walker, 1861)
- Comostola leucomerata (Walker, 1866)
- Comostola minutata (H. Druce, 1888)
- Comostola nereidaria (Snellen, 1881)
- Comostolopsis germana L.B. Prout, 1916
- Cosmogonia decorata (Warren, 1896)
- Crypsiphona amaura Meyrick, 1888
- Crypsiphona melanosema Meyrick, 1888
- Crypsiphona ocultaria (Donovan, 1805)
- Cymatoplex halcyone (Meyrick, 1889)
- Cymatoplex hypolichna Turner, 1910
- Cymatoplex subpellucida Aurivillius, 1920
- Cyneoterpna alpina Goldfinch, 1929
- Cyneoterpna wilsoni (R. Felder & Rogenhofer, 1875)
- Diplodesma celataria (Walker, 1866)
- Dysphania numana (Cramer, 1779)
- Epipristis oxycyma Meyrick, 1888
- Epipristis oxyodonta L.B. Prout, 1934
- Episothalma obscurata Warren, 1896
- Eretmopus marinaria (Guenée, 1857)
- Eucrostes disparata Walker, 1861
- Eucyclodes buprestaria (Guenée, 1857)
- Euloxia argocnemis (Meyrick, 1888)
- Euloxia beryllina (Meyrick, 1888)
- Euloxia fugitivaria (Guenée, 1857)
- Euloxia hypsithrona (Meyrick, 1888)
- Euloxia isadelpha Turner, 1910
- Euloxia leucochorda (Meyrick, 1888)
- Euloxia meandraria (Guenée, 1857)
- Euloxia meracula Turner, 1942
- Euloxia ochthaula (Meyrick, 1888)
- Euloxia pyropa (Meyrick, 1888)
- Gelasma angulata (T.P. Lucas, 1888)
- Gelasma calaina (Turner, 1910)
- Gelasma centrophylla (Meyrick, 1888)
- Gelasma multitincta (T.P. Lucas, 1891)
- Gelasma orthodesma (Lower, 1894)
- Gelasma selenosema Turner, 1941
- Heliomystis electrica Meyrick, 1888
- Hemichloreis exoterica (Meyrick, 1888)
- Hemithea doddi L.B. Prout, 1933
- Hemithea pellucidula (Turner, 1906)
- Hemithea wuka (Pagenstecher, 1886)
- Hypobapta barnardi Goldfinch, 1929
- Hypobapta diffundens (T.P. Lucas, 1891)
- Hypobapta percomptaria (Guenée, 1857)
- Hypobapta xenomorpha (Lower, 1915)
- Hypodoxa bryophylla (Goldfinch, 1929)
- Hypodoxa calliglauca (Turner, 1926)
- Hypodoxa conspurcata (T.P. Lucas, 1898)
- Hypodoxa deteriorata (Walker, 1860)
- Hypodoxa emiliaria (Guenée, 1857)
- Hypodoxa erebusata (Walker, 1860)
- Hypodoxa horridata (Walker, 1863)
- Hypodoxa multicolor (Warren, 1899)
- Hypodoxa muscosaria (Guenée, 1857)
- Hypodoxa paroptila (Turner, 1906)
- Idiochroa celidota Turner, 1922
- Idiochroa demissa Turner, 1922
- Idiochroa rufifrons Turner, 1941
- Iulops argocrana (Meyrick, 1888)
- Leucesthes alba (Swinhoe, 1902)
- Lophothorax eremnopis (Turner, 1922)
- Maxates coelataria (Walker, 1861)
- Maxates tanygona (Turner, 1904)
- Metallochlora ametalla Turner, 1910
- Metallochlora lineata Warren, 1896
- Metallochlora militaris (T.P. Lucas, 1891)
- Metallochlora neomela (Meyrick, 1889)
- Metallochlora venusta (Warren, 1896)
- Metallothea eucrostes L.B. Prout, 1916
- Mixocera latilineata (Walker, 1866)
- Mixochroa gratiosata (Guenée, 1857)
- Neothela cissochroa Turner, 1910
- Oenochlora imperialis Warren, 1896
- Oenospila flavifusata (Walker, 1861)
- Oxyphanes thiobapta Turner, 1936
- Pamphlebia rubrolimbraria (Guenée, 1857)
- Paraterpna harrisoni Goldfinch, 1929
- Pingasa angulifera Warren, 1896
- Pingasa blanda (Pagenstecher, 1900)
- Pingasa chlora (Stoll, 1782)
- Pingasa cinerea Warren, 1894
- Pingasa nobilis L.B. Prout, 1913
- Prasinocyma albicosta (Walker, 1861)
- Prasinocyma caniola (Warren, 1903)
- Prasinocyma crossota (Meyrick, 1888)
- Prasinocyma flavicosta (Warren, 1897)
- Prasinocyma floresaria (Walker, 1866)
- Prasinocyma gracilis (T.P. Lucas, 1888)
- Prasinocyma iosticta (Meyrick, 1888)
- Prasinocyma lychnopasta Turner, 1915
- Prasinocyma ocyptera (Meyrick, 1888)
- Prasinocyma rhodocosma (Meyrick, 1888)
- Prasinocyma semicrocea (Walker, 1861)
- Protophyta benigna Turner, 1939
- Protophyta castanea (Lower, 1898)
- Pyrrhorachis cornuta Warren, 1896
- Pyrrhorachis pyrrhogona (Walker, 1866)
- Rhuma subaurata Walker, 1860
- Sterictopsis argyraspis (Lower, 1893)
- Sterictopsis divergens Goldfinch, 1929
- Sterictopsis inconsequens Warren, 1898
- Thalassodes byrsopis Meyrick, 1886
- Thalassodes dorsilinea Warren, 1903
- Thalassodes pilaria Guenée, 1857
- Thalassodes rhytiphorus (Lower, 1893)
- Thalassodes veraria Guenée, 1857
- Uliocnemis biplagiata (Moore, 1887)
- Uliocnemis partita (Walker, 1861)
- Urolitha bipunctifera (Walker, 1861)
- Xenochlaena porphyropa (Lower, 1898)

The following species belong to the subfamily Geometrinae, but have not been assigned to a genus yet. Given here is the original name given to the species when it was first described:

- Cerura melanoglypta Lower, 1905
- Iodis nitida T.P. Lucas, 1892

== Subfamily Larentiinae ==
=== Asthenini ===
- Chaetolopha decipiens (Butler, 1886)
- Chaetolopha emporias (Turner, 1904)
- Chaetolopha leucophragma (Meyrick, 1891)
- Chaetolopha niphosticha (Turner, 1907)
- Chaetolopha oxyntis (Meyrick, 1891)
- Cretheis atrostrigata (Warren, 1894)
- Cretheis cymatodes Meyrick, 1886
- Epicyme rubropunctaria (Doubleday, 1843)
- Minoa aedaea (Turner, 1926)
- Minoa euthecta (Turner, 1904)
- Poecilasthena anthodes (Meyrick, 1891)
- Poecilasthena balioloma (Turner, 1907)
- Poecilasthena cisseres Turner, 1933
- Poecilasthena euphylla (Meyrick, 1891)
- Poecilasthena fragilis Turner, 1942
- Poecilasthena glaucosa (T.P. Lucas, 1888)
- Poecilasthena iopolia (Turner, 1926)
- Poecilasthena ischnophrica Turner, 1941
- Poecilasthena oceanias (Meyrick, 1891)
- Poecilasthena panapala Turner, 1922
- Poecilasthena phaeodryas Turner, 1931
- Poecilasthena pisicolor Turner, 1942
- Poecilasthena pulchraria (Doubleday, 1843)
- Poecilasthena scoliota (Meyrick, 1891)
- Poecilasthena sthenommata Turner, 1922
- Poecilasthena thalassias (Meyrick, 1891)
- Poecilasthena urarcha (Meyrick, 1891)
- Poecilasthena xylocyma (Meyrick, 1891)

=== Chesiadini ===
- Aplocera efformata (Guenée, 1857)
- Aplocera plagiata (Linnaeus, 1758)

=== Eupitheciini ===
- Aepylopha thalassia Turner, 1942
- Antimimistis illaudata Turner, 1922
- Chloroclystis ablechra Turner, 1904
- Chloroclystis alpnista Turner, 1907
- Chloroclystis approximata (Walker, 1869)
- Chloroclystis athaumasta Turner, 1908
- Chloroclystis bryodes Turner, 1907
- Chloroclystis catastreptes (Meyrick, 1891)
- Chloroclystis celidota Turner, 1931
- Chloroclystis cissocosma Turner, 1904
- Chloroclystis delosticha Turner, 1942
- Chloroclystis elaeopa Turner, 1908
- Chloroclystis embolocosma Turner, 1936
- Chloroclystis epilopha Turner, 1907
- Chloroclystis filata (Guenée, 1857)
- Chloroclystis gonias Turner, 1904
- Chloroclystis guttifera Turner, 1904
- Chloroclystis insigillata (Walker, 1862)
- Chloroclystis metallospora Turner, 1904
- Chloroclystis mniochroa Turner, 1904
- Chloroclystis nigrilineata Warren, 1898
- Chloroclystis pallidiplaga (Warren, 1898)
- Chloroclystis pauxillula Turner, 1907
- Chloroclystis perissa Turner, 1908
- Chloroclystis phoenochyta Turner, 1922
- Chloroclystis plinthochyta Turner, 1931
- Chloroclystis poliophrica Turner, 1922
- Chloroclystis pyrrholopha Turner, 1907
- Chloroclystis pyrsodonta Turner, 1922
- Chloroclystis stenophrica Turner, 1931
- Chloroclystis testulata (Guenée, 1857)
- Collix ghosha Walker, 1862
- Collix multifilata Warren, 1896
- Eriopithex recensitaria (Walker, 1862)
- Gymnoscelis acidna Turner, 1904
- Gymnoscelis aenictopa Turner, 1907
- Gymnoscelis callichlora Turner, 1907
- Gymnoscelis celaenephes Turner, 1907
- Gymnoscelis chlorobapta Turner, 1907
- Gymnoscelis coquina Warren, 1897
- Gymnoscelis delocyma Turner, 1904
- Gymnoscelis erymna (Meyrick, 1886)
- Gymnoscelis holocapna Turner, 1922
- Gymnoscelis ischnophylla Turner, 1942
- Gymnoscelis kennii Turner, 1922
- Gymnoscelis lophopus Turner, 1904
- Gymnoscelis mesophoena Turner, 1907
- Gymnoscelis minima (Warren, 1897)
- Gymnoscelis perpusilla Turner, 1942
- Gymnoscelis polyclealis (Walker, 1859)
- Gymnoscelis spodias Turner, 1922
- Gymnoscelis subrufata Warren, 1898
- Gymnoscelis tanaoptila Turner, 1907
- Gymnoscelis tristrigosa (Butler, 1880)
- Horisme mortuata (Guenée, 1857)
- Horisme plagiographa Turner, 1922
- Horisme xylinata (Warren, 1906)
- Mesoptila compsodes Meyrick, 1891
- Microdes arcuata Swinhoe, 1902
- Microdes asystata Turner, 1922
- Microdes decora Turner, 1942
- Microdes diplodonta Turner, 1904
- Microdes haemobaphes Turner, 1926
- Microdes leptobrya Turner, 1939
- Microdes melanocausta Meyrick, 1891
- Microdes oriochares Turner, 1922
- Microdes squamulata Guenée, 1857
- Microdes typhopa Lower, 1897
- Microdes villosata Guenée, 1857
- Micrulia tenuilinea Warren, 1896
- Mnesiloba eupitheciata (Walker, 1863)
- Phrissogonus laticostata (Walker, 1862)
- Symmimetis muscosa Turner, 1907
- Symmimetis sylvatica Turner, 1922
- Tephroclystia aphanes Turner, 1941
- Tephroclystia melanolopha (Swinhoe, 1895)
- Tephroclystia planiscripta Warren, 1902
- Tephroclystia tornolopha Turner, 1942
- Ziridava rufinigra Swinhoe, 1895
- Ziridava xylinaria Walker, 1863

=== Hydriomenini ===
- Anachloris subochraria (Doubleday, 1843)
- Anachloris uncinata (Guenée, 1857)
- Anomocentris capnoxutha Turner, 1939
- Anomocentris cosmadelpha (Lower, 1901)
- Anomocentris crystallota Meyrick, 1891
- Anomocentris trissodesma (Lower, 1897)
- Aponotoreas cheimatobiata (Guenée, 1857)
- Aponotoreas dascia (Turner, 1904)
- Aponotoreas epicrossa (Meyrick, 1891)
- Aponotoreas petrodes (Turner, 1904)
- Larentia aganopis Turner, 1922
- Larentia apotoma (Turner, 1907)
- Larentia assimilata (Walker, 1862)
- Larentia oribates Turner, 1922
- Larentia tenuis Turner, 1931
- Melitulias discophora Meyrick, 1891
- Melitulias glandulata (Guenée, 1857)
- Melitulias graphicata (Walker, 1861)
- Melitulias leucographa Turner, 1922
- Melitulias oriadelpha Turner, 1926
- Notoreas aethalopa Turner, 1907

=== Trichopterygini ===
- Episteira protima (Turner, 1907)
- Sauris brevipalpis Dugdale, 1980
- Sauris cirrhigera (Warren, 1897)
- Sauris commoni Dugdale, 1980
- Sauris dentatilinea (Warren, 1905)
- Sauris lichenias (Meyrick, 1891)
- Sauris malaca (Meyrick, 1891)
- Sauris melanoceros (Meyrick, 1889)
- Sauris melanosterna Dugdale, 1980
- Sauris nebulosa Dugdale, 1980
- Sauris plumipes Dugdale, 1980
- Sauris rectilineata Dugdale, 1980
- Sauris vetustata Walker, 1866
- Tympanota perophora (Turner, 1922)

=== Xanthorhoini ===
- Acodia chytrodes (Turner, 1926)
- Acodia orina (Turner, 1926)
- Acodia pauper Rosenstock, 1885
- Austrocidaria erasta (Turner, 1939)
- Chrysolarentia actinipha (Lower, 1902)
- Chrysolarentia adornata (Guenée, 1857)
- Chrysolarentia aglaodes (Meyrick, 1891)
- Chrysolarentia aprepta (Turner, 1922)
- Chrysolarentia arachnitis (Turner, 1904)
- Chrysolarentia argocyma (Turner, 1904)
- Chrysolarentia bertha (Swinhoe, 1902)
- Chrysolarentia bichromata (Guenée, 1857)
- Chrysolarentia caesia (Turner, 1904)
- Chrysolarentia callima (Turner, 1904)
- Chrysolarentia cataphaea (Meyrick, 1891)
- Chrysolarentia chrysocyma (Meyrick, 1891)
- Chrysolarentia cnephaeopa (Turner, 1926)
- Chrysolarentia conifasciata Butler, 1882
- Chrysolarentia coniophylla (Turner, 1922)
- Chrysolarentia crocota (Turner, 1904)
- Chrysolarentia cryeropa (Meyrick, 1891)
- Chrysolarentia cydalima (Turner, 1907)
- Chrysolarentia decisaria (Walker, 1863)
- Chrysolarentia doliopis (Meyrick, 1891)
- Chrysolarentia epicteta (Turner, 1908)
- Chrysolarentia euclidiata (Guenée, 1857)
- Chrysolarentia euphileta (Turner, 1907)
- Chrysolarentia eustropha (Turner, 1926)
- Chrysolarentia gypsomela (Lower, 1892)
- Chrysolarentia hedylepta (Turner, 1904)
- Chrysolarentia heliacaria (Guenée, 1857)
- Chrysolarentia heteroleuca (Meyrick, 1891)
- Chrysolarentia heterotropa Turner, 1926
- Chrysolarentia hilaodes (Turner, 1926)
- Chrysolarentia imperviata (Walker, 1862)
- Chrysolarentia inangulata (Bastelberger, 1908)
- Chrysolarentia insulsata (Guenée, 1857)
- Chrysolarentia interruptata (Guenée, 1857)
- Chrysolarentia leptophrica (Turner, 1922)
- Chrysolarentia leucophanes (Meyrick, 1891)
- Chrysolarentia leucozona (Meyrick, 1891)
- Chrysolarentia loxocyma (Turner, 1904)
- Chrysolarentia lucidulata (Walker, 1862)
- Chrysolarentia mecynata (Guenée, 1857)
- Chrysolarentia melanchlaena (Turner, 1922)
- Chrysolarentia microcyma (Guest, 1887)
- Chrysolarentia nephodes (Meyrick, 1891)
- Chrysolarentia opipara (Turner, 1907)
- Chrysolarentia orthropis (Meyrick, 1891)
- Chrysolarentia oxygona (Meyrick, 1891)
- Chrysolarentia oxyodonta (Turner, 1922)
- Chrysolarentia panochra (Turner, 1922)
- Chrysolarentia pantoea (Turner, 1908)
- Chrysolarentia perialla (Turner, 1922)
- Chrysolarentia pericalles (Turner, 1922)
- Chrysolarentia perornata (Walker, 1862)
- Chrysolarentia persimilis (Turner, 1926)
- Chrysolarentia phaedra (Meyrick, 1891)
- Chrysolarentia phaeoxutha (Turner, 1926)
- Chrysolarentia phaulophanes (Turner, 1936)
- Chrysolarentia photographica (Turner, 1939)
- Chrysolarentia plagiocausta (Turner, 1904)
- Chrysolarentia plesia (Turner, 1904)
- Chrysolarentia poliophasma (Turner, 1922)
- Chrysolarentia polycarpa (Meyrick, 1891)
- Chrysolarentia polyxantha (Meyrick, 1891)
- Chrysolarentia psarodes (Turner, 1904)
- Chrysolarentia ptochopis (Turner, 1907)
- Chrysolarentia rhynchota (Meyrick, 1891)
- Chrysolarentia severata (Guenée, 1857)
- Chrysolarentia squamulata (Warren, 1899)
- Chrysolarentia stereozona (Meyrick, 1891)
- Chrysolarentia subrectaria (Guenée, 1857)
- Chrysolarentia symphona (Meyrick, 1891)
- Chrysolarentia synchora (Meyrick, 1891)
- Chrysolarentia tacera (Turner, 1922)
- Chrysolarentia tasmanica (Turner, 1926)
- Chrysolarentia tristis (Butler, 1882)
- Chrysolarentia trygodes (Meyrick, 1891)
- Chrysolarentia vicissata (Guenée, 1857)
- Epyaxa agelasta (Turner, 1904)
- Epyaxa centroneura (Meyrick, 1891)
- Epyaxa epia (Turner, 1922)
- Epyaxa hyperythra (Lower, 1892)
- Epyaxa metoporina (Turner, 1922)
- Epyaxa pyrrhobaphes (Turner, 1926)
- Epyaxa sodaliata (Walker, 1862)
- Epyaxa subidaria (Guenée, 1857)
- Visiana brujata (Guenée, 1857)
- Visiana excentrata (Guenée, 1857)
- Xanthorhoe anaspila Meyrick, 1891
- Xanthorhoe anthracinata (Guenée, 1857)
- Xanthorhoe argodesma Meyrick, 1891
- Xanthorhoe emmelopis Turner, 1941
- Xanthorhoe hypogramma Lower, 1903
- Xanthorhoe pentodonta (Lower, 1915)
- Xanthorhoe percrassata (Walker, 1862)
- Xanthorhoe propinqua (Turner, 1936)
- Xanthorhoe rhodacris Lower, 1902
- Xanthorhoe strumosata (Guenée, 1857)
- Xanthorhoe vacuaria (Guenée, 1857)
- Xanthorhoe xanthospila Lower, 1892
- Xanthorhoe xerodes Meyrick, 1891

=== Unplaced to tribe ===
- Cleptocosmia mutabilis Warren, 1896
- Crasilogia gressitti Holloway, 1984
- Eccymatoge aorista (Turner, 1907)
- Eccymatoge callizona (Lower, 1894)
- Eccymatoge fulvida Turner, 1907
- Eccymatoge morphna Turner, 1922
- Ecnomophlebia argyrospila Turner, 1941
- Eremodorea haplopsara Turner, 1939
- Eucymatoge scotodes Turner, 1904
- Heterochasta conglobata (Walker, 1862)
- Heterochasta lasioplaca Lower, 1897
- Hypycnopa delotis Lower, 1903
- Papuanticlea horia (L.B. Prout, 1939)
- Polyclysta hypogrammata Guenée, 1857
- Scotocyma albinotata (Walker, 1866)
- Scotocyma euryochra Turner, 1922
- Scotocyma idioschema Turner, 1922
- Scotocyma ischnophrica Turner, 1932
- Scotocyma pteridophila (Turner, 1907)
- Scotocyma transfixa Turner, 1931

== Oenochrominae ==
- Adeixis inostentata (Walker, 1861)
- Aglossophanes adoxima Turner, 1942
- Aglossophanes pachygramma (Lower, 1893)
- Antasia flavicapitata (Guenée, 1857)
- Antictenia punctunculus (T.P. Lucas, 1892)
- Antictenia torta L.B. Prout, 1921
- Apotheta tanymita Turner, 1931
- Arcina fulgorigera Walker, 1863
- Arhodia lasiocamparia Guenée, 1857
- Axiagasta rhodobaphes Turner, 1930
- Cathaemacta loxomochla Turner, 1929
- Cathaemacta thermistis (Lower, 1894)
- Celerena griseofusa Warren, 1896
- Cernia amyclaria Walker, 1860
- Circopetes obtusata (Walker, 1860)
- Derambila catharina L.B. Prout, 1910
- Derambila idiosceles Turner, 1930
- Derambila liosceles Turner, 1930
- Derambila permensata (Walker, 1863)
- Dichromodes aesia Turner, 1930
- Dichromodes ainaria Guenée, 1857
- Dichromodes anelictis Meyrick, 1890
- Dichromodes angasi (R. Felder & Rogenhofer, 1875)
- Dichromodes aristadelpha Lower, 1903
- Dichromodes atrosignata (Walker, 1861)
- Dichromodes berthoudi L.B. Prout, 1910
- Dichromodes capnoporphyra Turner, 1939
- Dichromodes cirrhoplaca Lower, 1915
- Dichromodes compsotis Meyrick, 1890
- Dichromodes confluaria (Guenée, 1857)
- Dichromodes consignata (Walker, 1861)
- Dichromodes denticulata Turner, 1930
- Dichromodes diffusaria (Guenée, 1857)
- Dichromodes disputata (Walker, 1861)
- Dichromodes emplecta Turner, 1930
- Dichromodes estigmaria (Walker, 1861)
- Dichromodes euprepes L.B. Prout, 1910
- Dichromodes euscia Meyrick, 1890
- Dichromodes explanata (Walker, 1861)
- Dichromodes exsignata (Walker, 1861)
- Dichromodes fulvida Lower, 1915
- Dichromodes galactica Turner, 1930
- Dichromodes haematopa Turner, 1906
- Dichromodes icelodes Turner, 1930
- Dichromodes indicataria (Walker, 1866)
- Dichromodes ioneura Meyrick, 1890
- Dichromodes ischnota Meyrick, 1890
- Dichromodes lechria Turner, 1943
- Dichromodes leptogramma Turner, 1930
- Dichromodes leptozona Turner, 1930
- Dichromodes limosa Turner, 1930
- Dichromodes lissophrica Turner, 1930
- Dichromodes longidens L.B. Prout, 1910
- Dichromodes loxotropha Turner, 1943
- Dichromodes lygrodes Turner, 1930
- Dichromodes mesodonta Turner, 1930
- Dichromodes mesogonia L.B. Prout, 1910
- Dichromodes mesoporphyra Turner, 1939
- Dichromodes mesotoma Turner, 1943
- Dichromodes mesozona L.B. Prout, 1910
- Dichromodes molybdaria (Guenée, 1857)
- Dichromodes obtusata (Walker, 1861)
- Dichromodes orectis Meyrick, 1890
- Dichromodes oriphoetes Turner, 1930
- Dichromodes ornata (Walker, 1861)
- Dichromodes orthotis Meyrick, 1890
- Dichromodes orthozona Lower, 1903
- Dichromodes paratacta Meyrick, 1890
- Dichromodes partitaria (Walker, 1866)
- Dichromodes personalis (R. Felder & Rogenhofer, 1874)
- Dichromodes phaeoxesta Turner, 1939
- Dichromodes poecilotis Meyrick, 1890
- Dichromodes raynori L.B. Prout, 1920
- Dichromodes rimosa L.B. Prout, 1910
- Dichromodes rostrata Turner, 1930
- Dichromodes rufilinea Turner, 1939
- Dichromodes rufula L.B. Prout, 1910
- Dichromodes scothima L.B. Prout, 1910
- Dichromodes semicanescens L.B. Prout, 1913
- Dichromodes sigmata (Walker, 1861)
- Dichromodes stilbiata (Guenée, 1857)
- Dichromodes subrufa Turner, 1939
- Dichromodes triparata (Walker, 1861)
- Dichromodes typhistis Turner, 1939
- Dichromodes uniformis Bastelberger, 1907
- Dichromodes usurpatrix L.B. Prout, 1910
- Dinophalus ampycteria (Turner, 1930)
- Dinophalus atmoscia (Meyrick, 1890)
- Dinophalus bathrosema (L.B. Prout, 1911)
- Dinophalus bicorne (Aurivillius, 1920)
- Dinophalus cyanorrhoea (Lower, 1903)
- Dinophalus drakei (L.B. Prout, 1910)
- Dinophalus eremoea (Lower, 1907)
- Dinophalus hiracopis (Meyrick, 1890)
- Dinophalus idiocrana Turner, 1930
- Dinophalus incongrua (Walker, 1857)
- Dinophalus lechriomita Turner, 1930
- Dinophalus macrophyes (L.B. Prout, 1910)
- Dinophalus oxystoma (Turner, 1939)
- Dinophalus serpentaria (Guenée, 1864)
- Dinophalus thrasyschema (Turner, 1939)
- Ecphyas holopsara Turner, 1929
- Enchocrana lacista Turner, 1930
- Encryphia frontisignata (Walker, 1863)
- Epidesmia brachygrammella Lower, 1893
- Epidesmia chilonaria (Herrich-Schäffer, 1855)
- Epidesmia hypenaria (Guenée, 1857)
- Epidesmia oxyderces Meyrick, 1890
- Epidesmia perfabricata (Walker, 1861)
- Epidesmia phoenicina Turner, 1929
- Epidesmia reservata (Walker, 1861)
- Epidesmia tricolor Duncan & Westwood, 1841
- Epidesmia tryxaria (Guenée, 1857)
- Eumelea duponchelii (Montrouzier, 1856)
- Eumelea rosalia (Stoll, 1781)
- Eumelea stipata Turner, 1930
- Gastrophora henricaria Guenée, 1857
- Homospora rhodoscopa (Lower, 1902)
- Hypographa aristarcha L.B. Prout, 1910
- Hypographa epiodes Turner, 1930
- Hypographa phlegetonaria Guenée, 1857
- Hypographa reflua T.P. Lucas, 1898
- Lissomma dilutaria (Warren, 1903)
- Lissomma himerata Warren, 1905
- Lissomma minuta (Swinhoe, 1902)
- Lissomma postcarneata (L.B. Prout, 1910)
- Monoctenia falernaria Guenée, 1857
- Monoctenia smerintharia R. Felder & Rogenhofer, 1875
- Nearcha aridaria (Walker, 1866)
- Nearcha atyla Meyrick, 1890
- Nearcha benecristata Warren, 1895
- Nearcha buffalaria (Guenée, 1857)
- Nearcha caronia Swinhoe, 1902
- Nearcha curtaria (Guenée, 1857)
- Nearcha dasyzona (Lower, 1903)
- Nearcha nullata (Guenée, 1857)
- Nearcha ophla Swinhoe, 1902
- Nearcha pseudophaes Lower, 1893
- Nearcha staurotis Meyrick, 1890
- Nearcha tristificata (Walker, 1861)
- Nearcha ursaria (Guenée, 1857)
- Noreia vinacea Warren, 1899
- Nycticleptes lechriodesma Turner, 1939
- Oenochroma alpina Turner, 1930
- Oenochroma celidophora Turner, 1939
- Oenochroma cerasiplaga Warren, 1914
- Oenochroma cycnoptera (Lower, 1894)
- Oenochroma decolorata Warren, 1896
- Oenochroma infantilis L.B. Prout, 1910
- Oenochroma lissoscia Turner, 1922
- Oenochroma ochripennata (Walker, 1860)
- Oenochroma orthodesma (Lower, 1894)
- Oenochroma pallida Warren, 1898
- Oenochroma phyllomorpha (Lower, 1899)
- Oenochroma polyspila (Lower, 1897)
- Oenochroma privata (Walker, 1860)
- Oenochroma quardrigramma (T.P. Lucas, 1900)
- Oenochroma subustaria (Walker, 1860)
- Oenochroma turneri (T.P. Lucas, 1892)
- Oenochroma vetustaria (Walker, 1860)
- Oenochroma vinaria Guenée, 1857
- Omoplatica holopolia Turner, 1926
- Onycodes rubra (T.P. Lucas, 1892)
- Onycodes traumataria Guenée, 1857
- Ozola exigua Swinhoe, 1902
- Ozola hollowayi Scoble & Sommerer, 1988
- Parepisparis brevidactyla Scoble & E.D. Edwards, 1990
- Parepisparis dumigani Scoble & E.D. Edwards, 1990
- Parepisparis excusata (Walker, 1860)
- Parepisparis lutosaria (R. Felder & Rogenhofer, 1875)
- Parepisparis multicolora (T.P. Lucas, 1892)
- Parepisparis pallidus Scoble & E.D. Edwards, 1990
- Parepisparis rutila (Turner, 1947)
- Parepisparis virgatus Scoble & E.D. Edwards, 1990
- Phallaria ophiusaria Guenée, 1857
- Phrataria bijugata (Walker, 1863)
- Phrataria replicataria Walker, 1866
- Phrataria transcissata Walker, 1863
- Phrataria v-album Turner, 1944
- Phrixocomes gephyrea Turner, 1936
- Phrixocomes hedrasticha Turner, 1936
- Phrixocomes nexistriga (L.B. Prout, 1910)
- Phrixocomes ophiucha (Meyrick, 1890)
- Phrixocomes ptilomacra (Lower, 1892)
- Phrixocomes steropias (Meyrick, 1890)
- Physetostege miranda Warren, 1896
- Sarcinodes holzi Pagenstecher, 1888
- Symphylistis leptocyma Turner, 1930
- Systatica xanthastis (Lower, 1894)
- Tapinogyna oxypeuces Turner, 1933
- Tapinogyna perichroa (Lower, 1903)
- Taxeotis acrothecta Turner, 1904
- Taxeotis adelia L.B. Prout, 1910
- Taxeotis adelpha Turner, 1904
- Taxeotis aenigmatodes Turner, 1929
- Taxeotis alloceros Turner, 1929
- Taxeotis anthracopa Meyrick, 1890
- Taxeotis bigeminata L.B. Prout, 1910
- Taxeotis blechra Turner, 1929
- Taxeotis celidora Turner, 1939
- Taxeotis compar Turner, 1929
- Taxeotis didymosticha Turner, 1939
- Taxeotis egenata (Walker, 1861)
- Taxeotis endela Meyrick, 1890
- Taxeotis epigaea Turner, 1904
- Taxeotis epigypsa Meyrick, 1890
- Taxeotis eremophila Turner, 1929
- Taxeotis euryzona Turner, 1936
- Taxeotis eutyctodes Turner, 1939
- Taxeotis exaereta Turner, 1929
- Taxeotis exsectaria (Walker, 1861)
- Taxeotis goniogramma Meyrick, 1897
- Taxeotis helicta Turner, 1939
- Taxeotis holoscia Lower, 1903
- Taxeotis homoeopa Turner, 1944
- Taxeotis intermixtaria (Walker, 1861)
- Taxeotis intextata (Guenée, 1857)
- Taxeotis isomeris Meyrick, 1890
- Taxeotis lechrioschema Turner, 1939
- Taxeotis limbosa Turner, 1933
- Taxeotis lygrophanes (Turner, 1943)
- Taxeotis maerens Turner, 1939
- Taxeotis mimela L.B. Prout, 1910
- Taxeotis notosticta Turner, 1936
- Taxeotis ochrosticta Turner, 1929
- Taxeotis oraula Meyrick, 1890
- Taxeotis orphnina Turner, 1904
- Taxeotis perlinearia (Walker, 1861)
- Taxeotis phaeopa Lower, 1899
- Taxeotis philodora Meyrick, 1890
- Taxeotis phricocyma Turner, 1929
- Taxeotis pleurostigma Turner, 1943
- Taxeotis pychnomochla Turner, 1939
- Taxeotis reserata (Walker, 1860)
- Taxeotis spodoides Turner, 1943
- Taxeotis stereospila Meyrick, 1890
- Taxeotis thegalea Turner, 1939
- Taxeotis xanthogramma Lower, 1903
- Thaumatographe singularis Warren, 1907
- Zeuctophlebia squalidata (Walker, 1863)
- Zeuctophlebia tapinodes Turner, 1904

== Subfamily Sterrhinae ==
- Anisodes ampligutta (Warren, 1896)
- Anisodes compacta (Warren, 1898)
- Anisodes flavirubra (Warren, 1896)
- Anisodes flavispila (Warren, 1896)
- Anisodes frenaria Guenée, 1857
- Anisodes griseata (Warren, 1896)
- Anisodes jocosa (Warren, 1896)
- Anisodes lechriostropha Turner, 1941
- Anisodes leptopasta Turner, 1908
- Anisodes longidiscata (Warren, 1904)
- Anisodes minorata (Warren, 1897)
- Anisodes monetaria Guenée, 1857
- Anisodes niveopuncta (Warren, 1897)
- Anisodes obliviaria Walker, 1861
- Anisodes obstataria (Walker, 1861)
- Anisodes perpunctulata L.B. Prout, 1938
- Anisodes porphyropis (Meyrick, 1888)
- Anisodes praetermissa (Bastelberger, 1908)
- Anisodes punctata (Warren, 1897)
- Anisodes recusataria (Walker, 1863)
- Anisodes rhodobapta Turner, 1941
- Anisodes sciota Turner, 1908
- Anisodes sordidata (Warren, 1896)
- Anisodes sticta (Turner, 1941)
- Anisodes turneri Prout, 1920
- Antitrygodes parvimacula Warren, 1896
- Autanepsia poliodesma Turner, 1908
- Chorizomena nivosa Turner, 1939
- Chrysocraspeda aurimargo Warren, 1897
- Chrysocraspeda cruoraria (Warren, 1897)
- Chrysocraspeda eumeles Turner, 1936
- Chrysocraspeda leucotoca L.B. Prout, 1938
- Dasybela achroa (Lower, 1902)
- Dasybela argillina (Lower, 1915)
- Dithalama cosmospila Meyrick, 1888
- Dithalama desueta (Warren, 1902)
- Dithalama persalsa (Warren, 1902)
- Dithalama punctilinea (Swinhoe, 1902)
- Gnamptoloma aventiaria (Guenée, 1857)
- Gnamptoloma rubra Holloway, 1979
- Idaea alopecodes (Meyrick, 1888)
- Idaea argophylla (Turner, 1922)
- Idaea chloristis (Meyrick, 1888)
- Idaea coercita (T.P. Lucas, 1900)
- Idaea costaria (Walker, 1863)
- Idaea crinipes (Warren, 1897)
- Idaea dasypus (Turner, 1908)
- Idaea delosticta (Turner, 1922)
- Idaea dolichopis (Turner, 1908)
- Idaea elachista (Turner, 1922)
- Idaea elaphrodes (Turner, 1908)
- Idaea epicyrta (Turner, 1917)
- Idaea eretmopus (Turner, 1908)
- Idaea euclasta (Turner, 1922)
- Idaea eucrossa (Turner, 1932)
- Idaea ferrilinea (Warren, 1900)
- Idaea franconiaria (Swinhoe, 1902)
- Idaea fucosa (Warren, 1900)
- Idaea halmaea (Meyrick, 1888)
- Idaea inversata (Guenée, 1857)
- Idaea iodesma (Meyrick, 1897)
- Idaea leptochyta (Turner, 1942)
- Idaea lucida (Turner, 1942)
- Idaea miltophrica (Turner, 1922)
- Idaea nanata (Warren, 1897)
- Idaea nephelota (Turner, 1908)
- Idaea pachydetis (Meyrick, 1888)
- Idaea partita (T.P. Lucas, 1900)
- Idaea philocosma (Meyrick, 1888)
- Idaea pilosata (Warren, 1898)
- Idaea probleta (Turner, 1908)
- Idaea pseliota (Meyrick, 1888)
- Idaea punctatissima (Warren, 1901)
- Idaea rhopalopus (Turner, 1908)
- Idaea scaura (Turner, 1922)
- Idaea scintillans (Warren, 1898)
- Idaea simplex (Warren, 1899)
- Idaea stenozona (Lower, 1902)
- Idaea trissomita (Turner, 1941)
- Idaea trissorma (Turner, 1926)
- Idaea trypheropa (Meyrick, 1889)
- Idaea uniformis (Warren, 1896)
- Idaea zonata (L.B. Prout, 1932)
- Notiosterrha aglaodesma (Lower, 1893)
- Notiosterrha interalbulata (Warren, 1904)
- Notiosterrha pulcherrima (Turner, 1939)
- Notiosterrha rhodocosma (Lower, 1897)
- Notiosterrha triglypta (Lower, 1908)
- Organopoda olivescens Warren, 1896
- Problepsis apollinaria (Guenée, 1857)
- Problepsis clemens T.P. Lucas, 1890
- Problepsis sancta Meyrick, 1888
- Problepsis transposita Warren, 1903
- Ptochophyle cyphosticha Turner, 1908
- Scopula adeptaria (Walker, 1861)
- Scopula agnes (Butler, 1886)
- Scopula aleuritis (Turner, 1908)
- Scopula amala (Meyrick, 1886)
- Scopula axiotis (Meyrick, 1888)
- Scopula caesaria (Walker, 1861)
- Scopula castissima (Warren, 1897)
- Scopula coenona (Turner, 1908)
- Scopula desita (Walker, 1860)
- Scopula despoliata (Walker, 1861)
- Scopula didymosema (Lower, 1893)
- Scopula emissaria (Walker, 1861)
- Scopula episcia (Meyrick, 1888)
- Scopula episticta Turner, 1942
- Scopula erebospila (Lower, 1902)
- Scopula hypocallista (Lower, 1900)
- Scopula hypochra (Meyrick, 1888)
- Scopula innocens (Butler, 1886)
- Scopula isodesma (Lower, 1903)
- Scopula lechrioloma (Turner, 1908)
- Scopula liotis (Meyrick, 1888)
- Scopula loxographa Turner, 1941
- Scopula loxosema (Turner, 1908)
- Scopula lydia (Butler, 1886)
- Scopula megalocentra (Meyrick, 1888)
- Scopula neoxesta (Meyrick, 1888)
- Scopula oppilata (Walker, 1861)
- Scopula optivata (Walker, 1861)
- Scopula orthoscia (Meyrick, 1888)
- Scopula perialurga (Turner, 1922)
- Scopula perlata (Walker, 1861)
- Scopula prosoeca (Turner, 1908)
- Scopula rubraria (Doubleday, 1843)
- Scopula subcandida L.B. Prout, 1938
- Scopula sublinearia (Walker, 1866)
- Scopula synethes (Turner, 1922)
- Scopula thysanopus (Turner, 1908)
- Somatina eurymitra Turner, 1926
- Somatina microphylla (Meyrick, 1889)
- Somatina rufifascia Warren, 1896
- Somatina triocellata (Bastelberger, 1908)
- Symmacra solidaria (Guenée, 1857)
- Traminda mundissima (Walker, 1861)
- Traminda prasodes (Meyrick, 1888)
- Zygophyxia relictata (Walker, 1866)
- Zythos aphrodite (L.B. Prout, 1932)
