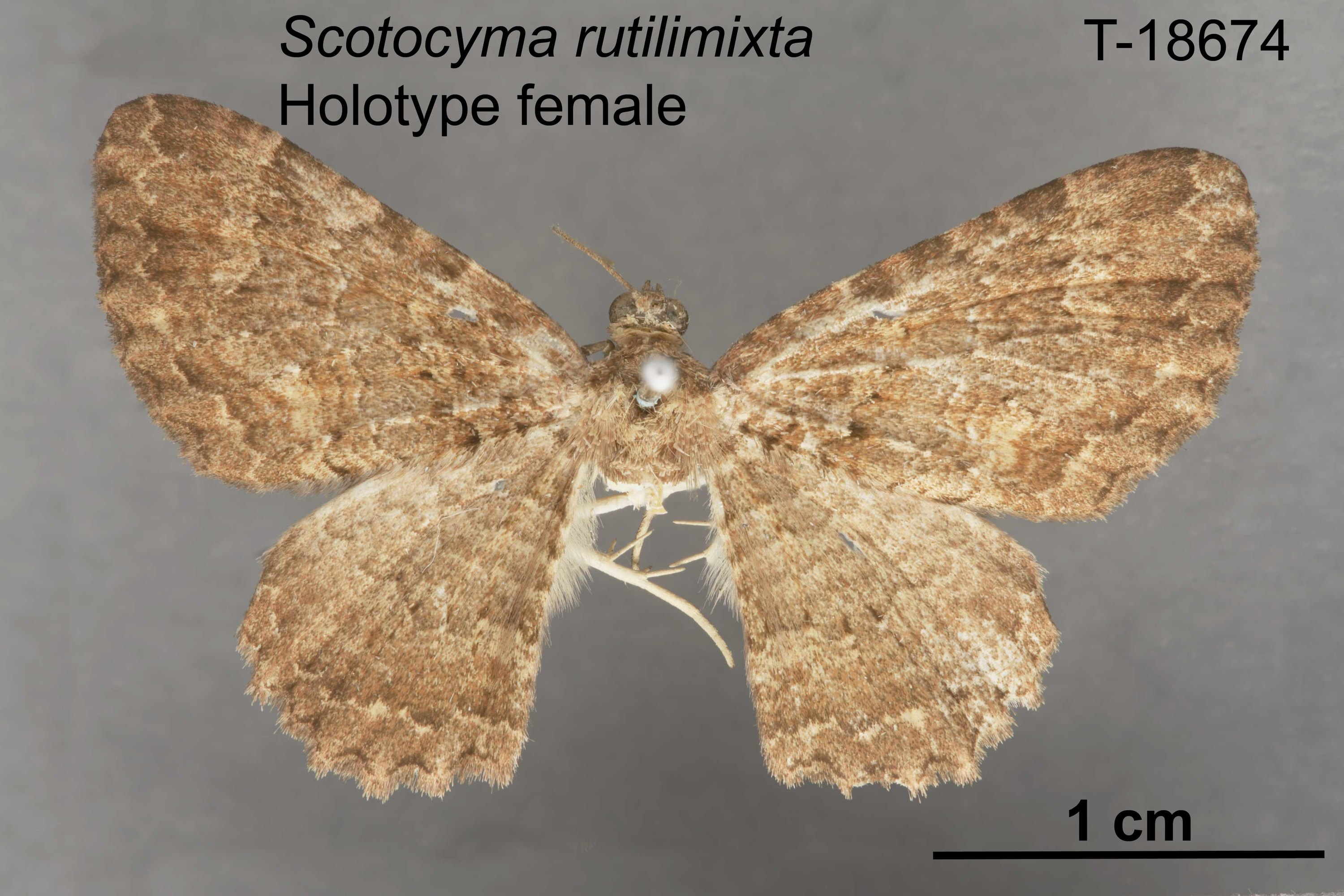
- Scotocyma rutilimixta, holotype

Scientific classification
- Kingdom: Animalia
- Phylum: Arthropoda
- Class: Insecta
- Order: Lepidoptera
- Family: Geometridae
- Subfamily: Larentiinae
- Genus: Scotocyma; Turner, 1904

Synonyms
- Paragramma Warren, 1905

= Scotocyma =

Genus of insects

Scotocyma is a genus of moths in the family Geometridae described by Alfred Jefferis Turner in 1904. All the species in this genus are found in Australia.

== Species ==
- Scotocyma albinotata (Walker, [1866])
- Scotocyma euryochra Turner, 1922
- Scotocyma idioschema Turner, 1922
- Scotocyma ischnophrica Turner, 1932
- Scotocyma pteridophila (Turner, 1907)
- Scotocyma rutilimixta Schmidt, 2005
- Scotocyma transfixa Turner, 1931
