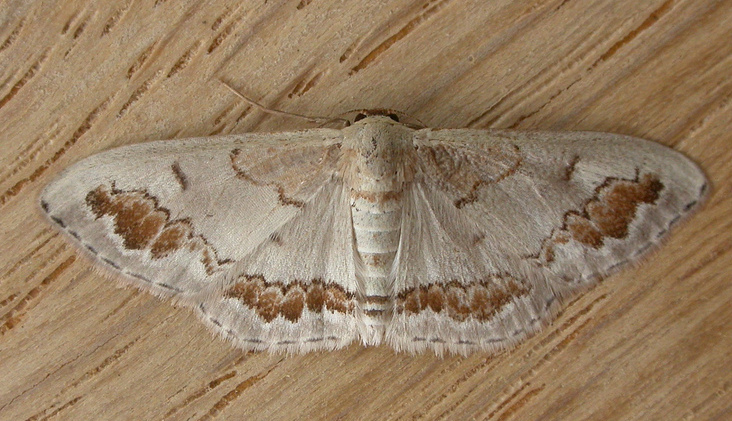
- Dithalama cosmospila

Scientific classification
- Kingdom: Animalia
- Phylum: Arthropoda
- Clade: Pancrustacea
- Class: Insecta
- Order: Lepidoptera
- Family: Geometridae
- Tribe: Scopulini
- Genus: Dithalama; Meyrick, 1888

= Dithalama =

Genus of moths

Dithalama is a genus of moths in the family Geometridae.

== Species ==
- Dithalama cosmospila Meyrick, 1888
- Dithalama desueta (Warren, 1902)
- Dithalama persalsa (Warren, 1902)
- Dithalama punctilinea (Swinhoe, 1902)
