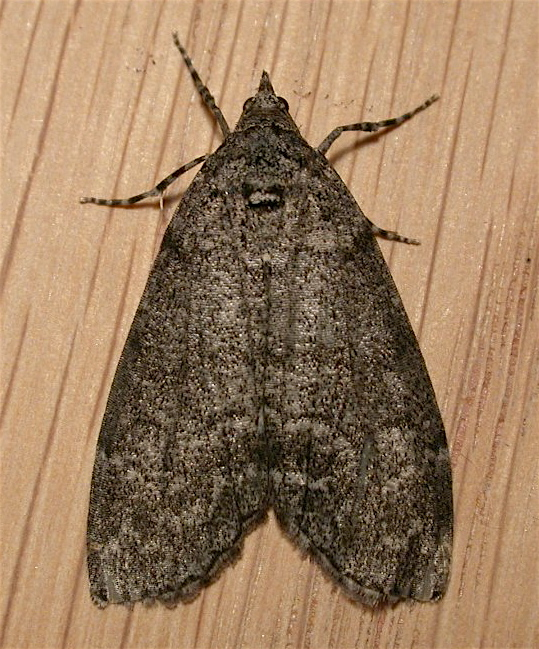
- Smyriodes trigramma

Scientific classification
- Kingdom: Animalia
- Phylum: Arthropoda
- Class: Insecta
- Order: Lepidoptera
- Family: Geometridae
- Tribe: Nacophorini
- Genus: Smyriodes; Guenée, 1857

= Smyriodes =

Genus of moths in Australia

Smyriodes is a genus of moths in the family Geometridae first described by Achille Guenée in 1857. Both species are known from Australia.

== Species ==
- Smyriodes aplectaria Guenée, 1857
- Smyriodes trigramma (Lower, 1892)
