= Protophyta (moth) =

Scientific classification
- Kingdom: Animalia
- Phylum: Arthropoda
- Class: Insecta
- Order: Lepidoptera
- Family: Geometridae
- Tribe: Pseudoterpnini
- Genus: Protophyta; Turner, 1910

Genus of moths

Protophyta is a genus of moths in the family Geometridae described by Alfred Jefferis Turner in 1910.

== Species ==
- Protophyta benigna Turner, 1939
- Protophyta castanea (Lower, 1898)
