= Scopula isodesma =

Scientific classification
- Domain: Eukaryota
- Kingdom: Animalia
- Phylum: Arthropoda
- Class: Insecta
- Order: Lepidoptera
- Family: Geometridae
- Genus: Scopula
- Species: S. isodesma

Binomial name
- Scopula isodesma (Lower, 1903)

Synonyms
- Leptomeris isodesma Lower, 1903

Species of geometer moth in subfamily Sterrhinae

Scopula isodesma is a moth of the family Geometridae. It is found in Australia (New South Wales).
