= Thallogama =

Scientific classification
- Domain: Eukaryota
- Kingdom: Animalia
- Phylum: Arthropoda
- Class: Insecta
- Order: Lepidoptera
- Family: Geometridae
- Tribe: Boarmiini
- Genus: Thallogama; Guest, 1887

Genus of moths

Thallogama is a genus of moths in the family Geometridae.

== Species ==
The following five species are recognized:

- Thallogama aellographa (Turner, 1947) – Speckled bark moth
- Thallogama corticola (G.M. Goldfinch, 1944) – Chequered bark moth, mycelium moth
- Thallogama destinataria (Guenée) – Dappled bark moth
- Thallogama nigraria (Felder & Rogenhofer, 1875) – Black Bark Moth
- Thallogama pansticta (Turner, 1947) – Flecked bark moth
