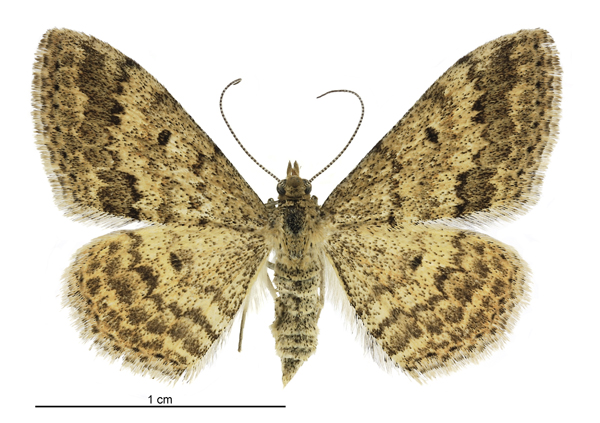
- Female
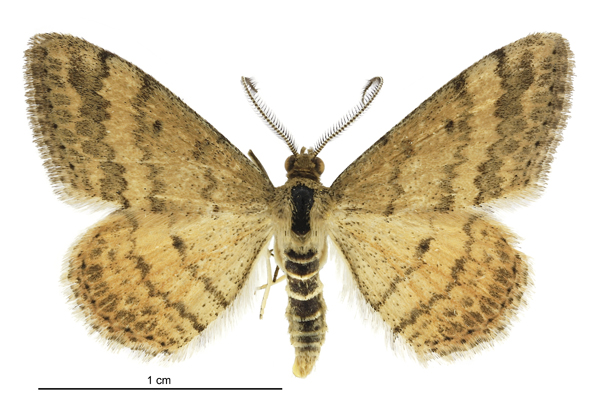
- Male

Scientific classification
- Kingdom: Animalia
- Phylum: Arthropoda
- Clade: Pancrustacea
- Class: Insecta
- Order: Lepidoptera
- Family: Geometridae
- Genus: Scopula
- Species: S. rubraria

Binomial name
- Scopula rubraria (Doubleday, 1843)

Synonyms
- Ptychopoda rubraria Doubleday, 1843; Fidonia acidaliaria Walker, 1862; Acidalia attributa Walker, 1861; Acidalia figlinaria Guenee, 1857; Acidalia repletaria Walker, 1861; Leptomeris rubraria (Doubleday, 1843)

= Scopula rubraria =

Species of geometer moth in subfamily Sterrhinae

Scopula rubraria, also called the plantain moth, is a species of moth of the family Geometridae. It is native to Australia, New Caledonia and New Zealand.

== Taxonomy ==
This species was first described by Edward Doubleday in 1843 and originally named Ptychopoda rubraria.

== Description ==
The plantain moth has straw-coloured wings with zigzag markings. The wingspan is about 20 millimetres (0.8 in).

== Distribution ==
The moth is found throughout New Zealand and Australia (especially the more coastal regions of south-eastern Australia, including Tasmania), and in the Kermadec Islands, Norfolk Island and New Caledonia.

== Host species ==
The caterpillars feed on Plantago lanceolata (narrow-leaved plantain), and have also been raised on Medicago sativa (lucerne) and the New Zealand endemic plantain Plantago spathulata. With the increased planting of narrow-leaved plantain as a forage plant in New Zealand, it has become a nuisance for farmers, along with Epyaxa rosearia, another New Zealand geometrid moth whose caterpillars feed on plantain.
