= Scopula despoliata =

Scientific classification
- Kingdom: Animalia
- Phylum: Arthropoda
- Class: Insecta
- Order: Lepidoptera
- Family: Geometridae
- Genus: Scopula
- Species: S. despoliata

Binomial name
- Scopula despoliata (Walker, 1861)

Synonyms
- Acidalia despoliata Walker, 1861; Craspedia crurata Warren, 1901

Species of geometer moth in subfamily Sterrhinae

Scopula despoliata is a moth of the family Geometridae. It is found in Australia (Queensland) and New Guinea.
