= Scopula adeptaria =

Scientific classification
- Kingdom: Animalia
- Phylum: Arthropoda
- Class: Insecta
- Order: Lepidoptera
- Family: Geometridae
- Genus: Scopula
- Species: S. adeptaria

Binomial name
- Scopula adeptaria (Walker, 1861)

Synonyms
- Acidalia adeptaria Walker, 1861; Craspedia eximia Warren, 1898; Acidalia tenuipes Turner, 1914; Ptychopoda tainanensis Wileman & South, 1917

Species of geometer moth in subfamily Sterrhinae

Scopula adeptaria is a moth of the family Geometridae. It was described by Francis Walker in 1861. It is found in Sri Lanka, India, Taiwan, Hainan, southern Myanmar, Peninsular Malaysia, Borneo, the Philippines, Sumba and northern Australia.

== Description ==
The wingspan is 16 millimetres (0.63 in). The males are whitish irrorated (sprinkled) with brown. Frons blackish. Forewings with indistinct sinuous antemedial fuscous line excurved above median nervure. Both wings with cell-speck. A medial oblique line excurved round cell of forewings. Sinuous postmedial and submarginal lines present along with a marginal specks series. Female more suffused with fuscous. The submarginal dark line of the wing with white on its outer edge.

== Subspecies ==
- Scopula adeptaria adeptaria
- Scopula adeptaria tenuipes (Turner, 1914) (Australia)
