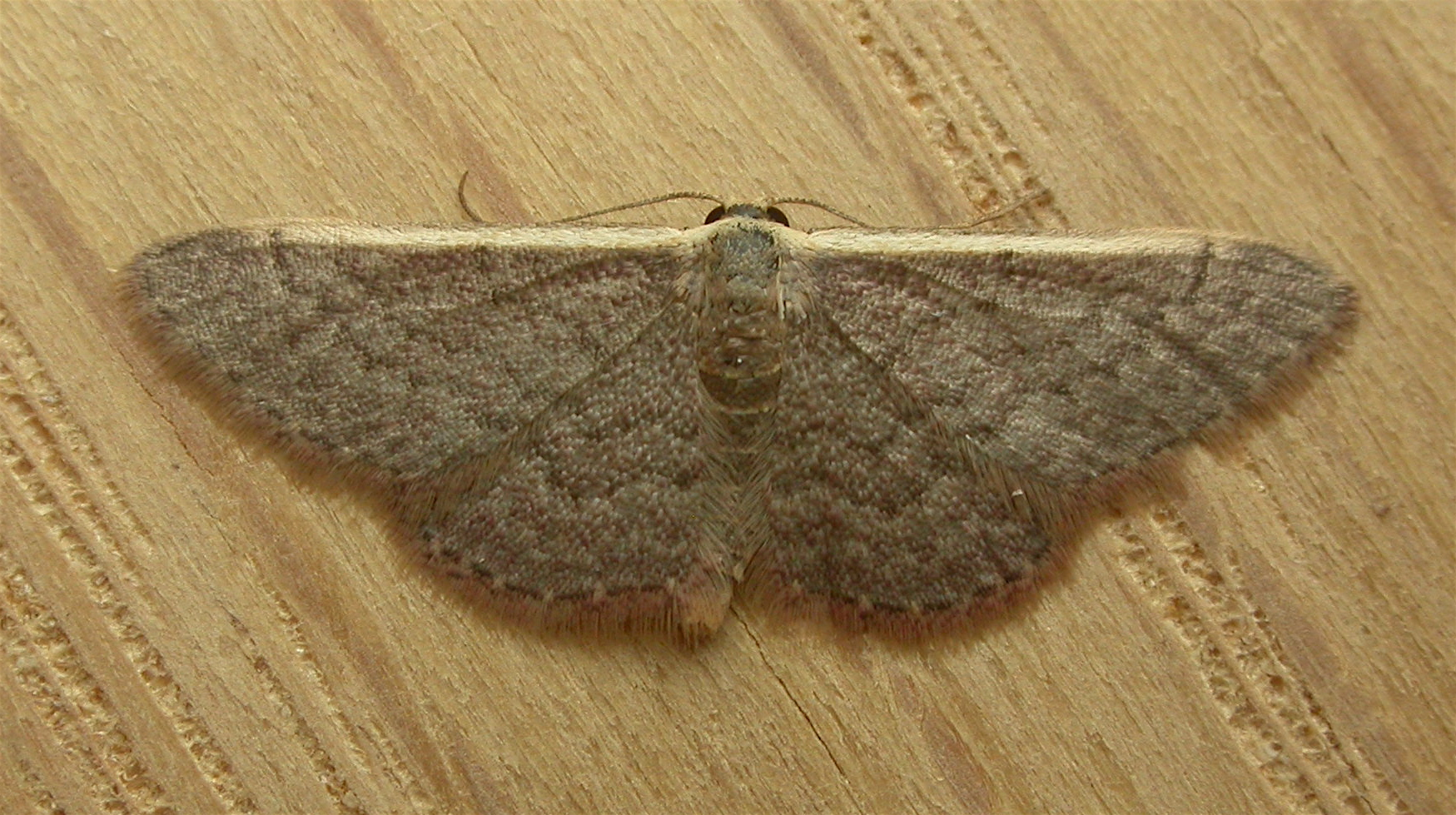

Scientific classification
- Kingdom: Animalia
- Phylum: Arthropoda
- Clade: Pancrustacea
- Class: Insecta
- Order: Lepidoptera
- Family: Geometridae
- Genus: Idaea
- Species: I. costaria

Binomial name
- Idaea costaria (Walker, 1863)

Synonyms
- Acidalia costaria Walker 1863

= Idaea costaria =

Species of moth

Idaea costaria is a species of moth of the family Geometridae. It is found in south-eastern Australia.

Idaea costaria is externally very similar to Idaea inversata but, unlike that species, has a two-coloured head pattern. Idaea costaria has a creamy-white patch between the antennae, whereas I. inversata is dark reddish throughout this area.
