= Eupithecia aphanes =

Scientific classification
- Domain: Eukaryota
- Kingdom: Animalia
- Phylum: Arthropoda
- Class: Insecta
- Order: Lepidoptera
- Family: Geometridae
- Genus: Eupithecia
- Species: E. aphanes

Binomial name
- Eupithecia aphanes (Turner, 1941)

Synonyms
- Tephroclystia aphanes Turner, 1941

Species of moth

Eupithecia aphanes is a moth in the family Geometridae. It is found in Australia.
