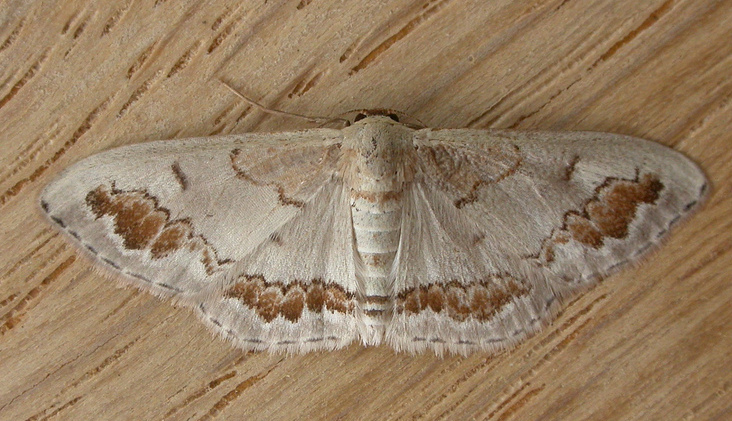

Scientific classification
- Kingdom: Animalia
- Phylum: Arthropoda
- Class: Insecta
- Order: Lepidoptera
- Family: Geometridae
- Genus: Dithalama
- Species: D. cosmospila

Binomial name
- Dithalama cosmospila Meyrick, 1888

= Dithalama cosmospila =

Species of moth

Dithalama cosmospila is a species of moth of the family Geometridae first described by Edward Meyrick in 1888. It is found in Australia.
