= Scopula desita =

Scientific classification
- Kingdom: Animalia
- Phylum: Arthropoda
- Clade: Pancrustacea
- Class: Insecta
- Order: Lepidoptera
- Family: Geometridae
- Genus: Scopula
- Species: S. desita

Binomial name
- Scopula desita (Walker, 1861)

Synonyms
- Tephrosia desita Walker, 1860; Acidalia vibrata Lucas, 1900

Species of geometer moth in subfamily Sterrhinae

Scopula desita is a moth of the family Geometridae. It is found from Australia to the Sunda Islands, Tenimbar Islands and the Philippines.

== Subspecies ==
- Scopula desita desita (Australia)
- Scopula desita luzonica Prout, 1931 (Philippines: Luzon)
