= Scopula emissaria =

Scientific classification
- Kingdom: Animalia
- Phylum: Arthropoda
- Clade: Pancrustacea
- Class: Insecta
- Order: Lepidoptera
- Family: Geometridae
- Genus: Scopula
- Species: S. emissaria

Binomial name
- Scopula emissaria (Walker, 1861)

Synonyms
- Acidalia emissaria Walker, 1861; Acidalia defamataria Walker, 1861; Lycauges mollis Warren, 1896; Lycauges lactea Butler, 1879; Lycauges proxima Butler, 1886

Species of geometer moth in subfamily Sterrhinae

Scopula emissaria is a moth of the family Geometridae. It was described by Francis Walker in 1861. It is found in India, Sri Lanka, Myanmar, Vietnam, China, Korea, Japan, the Philippines, Sumatra, Java, Wallacea and Australia.

== Description ==
The wingspan is about 28 millimetres (1.1 in). Forewings with produced apex. It is an ochreous moth irrorated (sprinkled) with fuscous, and usually suffused with tan-pink color. Frons dark brown. Vertex of head whitish. Abdomen with dark segmental bands. Forewings with traces of oblique antemedial line and a discocellular black spot. There is an oblique postmedial more or less prominent diffused band from the angle of the postmedial oblique black specks series, which is recurved to costa. Hindwings with a diffused antemedial band from the discocellular black speck runs to inner margin. Three slightly waved lines found on the upper half of wing, where the first being usually the most prominent. Both wings with marginal black specks series.

== Subspecies ==
- Scopula emissaria emissaria (India, Sri Lanka)
- Scopula emissaria lactea (Butler, 1879) (Japan)
- Scopula emissaria proxima (Butler, 1886) (Australia: Queensland)
