= Scopula achroa =

Scientific classification
- Domain: Eukaryota
- Kingdom: Animalia
- Phylum: Arthropoda
- Class: Insecta
- Order: Lepidoptera
- Family: Geometridae
- Genus: Scopula
- Species: S. achroa

Binomial name
- Scopula achroa Lower, 1902

Synonyms
- Emmiltis achroa Lower, 1902; Dasybela achroa

Species of geometer moth in subfamily Sterrhinae

Scopula achroa, the Tasmanian saltmarsh looper moth, is a moth of the family Geometridae. It was described by Oswald Bertram Lower in 1902. It is only found in the saltmarshes of Tasmania.

Adults have brown wings with zigzag markings.
