= Dithalama persalsa =

Scientific classification
- Kingdom: Animalia
- Phylum: Arthropoda
- Class: Insecta
- Order: Lepidoptera
- Family: Geometridae
- Genus: Dithalama
- Species: D. persalsa

Binomial name
- Dithalama persalsa (Warren, 1902)

Synonyms
- Cinglis persalsa Warren, 1902; Sterrha ioparia Swinhoe, 1902

Species of moth

Dithalama persalsa is a moth of the family Geometridae. It is found in Western Australia.
