= Scopula agnes =

Scientific classification
- Domain: Eukaryota
- Kingdom: Animalia
- Phylum: Arthropoda
- Class: Insecta
- Order: Lepidoptera
- Family: Geometridae
- Genus: Scopula
- Species: S. agnes

Binomial name
- Scopula agnes (Butler, 1886)

Synonyms
- Idaea agnes Butler, 1886

Species of geometer moth in subfamily Sterrhinae

Scopula agnes is a moth of the family Geometridae. It was described by Arthur Gardiner Butler in 1886. It is endemic to Australia.
