= Scopula loxographa =

Scientific classification
- Domain: Eukaryota
- Kingdom: Animalia
- Phylum: Arthropoda
- Class: Insecta
- Order: Lepidoptera
- Family: Geometridae
- Genus: Scopula
- Species: S. loxographa

Binomial name
- Scopula loxographa Turner, 1941

Species of geometer moth in subfamily Sterrhinae

Scopula loxographa is a moth of the family Geometridae. It was described by Turner in 1941. It is found in Australia (Queensland).
