= Scopula thysanopus =

Scientific classification
- Kingdom: Animalia
- Phylum: Arthropoda
- Class: Insecta
- Order: Lepidoptera
- Family: Geometridae
- Genus: Scopula
- Species: S. thysanopus

Binomial name
- Scopula thysanopus (Turner, 1908)

Synonyms
- Leptomeris thysanopus Turner, 1908

Species of geometer moth in subfamily Sterrhinae

Scopula thysanopus is a moth belonging to the Geometridae family. It is found in Australia (Queensland).
