= Scopula perialurga =

Scientific classification
- Domain: Eukaryota
- Kingdom: Animalia
- Phylum: Arthropoda
- Class: Insecta
- Order: Lepidoptera
- Family: Geometridae
- Genus: Scopula
- Species: S. perialurga

Binomial name
- Scopula perialurga (Turner, 1922)

Synonyms
- Acidalia perialurga Turner 1922

Species of geometer moth in subfamily Sterrhinae

Scopula perialurga is a moth of the family Geometridae. It is found in Australia (including New South Wales).
