= Eupithecia planiscripta =

Scientific classification
- Domain: Eukaryota
- Kingdom: Animalia
- Phylum: Arthropoda
- Class: Insecta
- Order: Lepidoptera
- Family: Geometridae
- Genus: Eupithecia
- Species: E. planiscripta

Binomial name
- Eupithecia planiscripta (Warren, 1902)

Synonyms
- Tephroclystia planiscripta Warren, 1902

Species of moth

Eupithecia planiscripta is a moth in the family Geometridae first described by William Warren in 1902. It is found in Australia.
