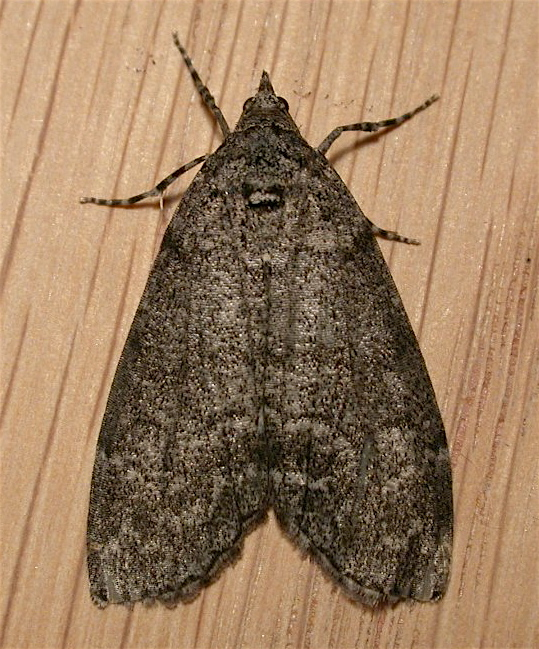

Scientific classification
- Domain: Eukaryota
- Kingdom: Animalia
- Phylum: Arthropoda
- Class: Insecta
- Order: Lepidoptera
- Family: Geometridae
- Genus: Smyriodes
- Species: S. trigramma

Binomial name
- Smyriodes trigramma Lower, 1892

Synonyms
- Stibaroma mesosticha

= Smyriodes trigramma =

Species of moth

Smyriodes trigramma, the stippled line-moth, is a species of moth of the family Geometridae first described by Oswald Bertram Lower in 1892. It is found over most of the non-tropical regions of Australia.

The wingspan is about 30 mm.

The larvae feed on Eucalyptus species.
