= Protophyta benigna =

Scientific classification
- Kingdom: Animalia
- Phylum: Arthropoda
- Class: Insecta
- Order: Lepidoptera
- Family: Geometridae
- Genus: Protophyta
- Species: P. benigna

Binomial name
- Protophyta benigna Turner, 1939

Species of moth

Protophyta benigna is a moth of the family Geometridae first described by Alfred Jefferis Turner in 1939. It is found in Queensland, Australia.
