= Scopula synethes =

Scientific classification
- Domain: Eukaryota
- Kingdom: Animalia
- Phylum: Arthropoda
- Class: Insecta
- Order: Lepidoptera
- Family: Geometridae
- Genus: Scopula
- Species: S. synethes

Binomial name
- Scopula synethes (Turner, 1922)

Synonyms
- Acidalia synethes Turner, 1922

Species of geometer moth in subfamily Sterrhinae

Scopula synethes is a moth of the family Geometridae. It is found in Western Australia.
