= Scopula hypochra =

Scientific classification
- Kingdom: Animalia
- Phylum: Arthropoda
- Class: Insecta
- Order: Lepidoptera
- Family: Geometridae
- Genus: Scopula
- Species: S. hypochra

Binomial name
- Scopula hypochra (Meyrick, 1888)

Synonyms
- Acidalia hypochra Meyrick, 1888

Species of geometer moth in subfamily Sterrhinae

Scopula hypochra is a moth of the family Geometridae. It is found from Australia (Queensland) and Norfolk Island to Japan.
