= Scopula erebospila =

Scientific classification
- Domain: Eukaryota
- Kingdom: Animalia
- Phylum: Arthropoda
- Class: Insecta
- Order: Lepidoptera
- Family: Geometridae
- Genus: Scopula
- Species: S. erebospila

Binomial name
- Scopula erebospila (Lower, 1902)

Synonyms
- Pylarge erebospila Lower, 1902

Species of geometer moth in subfamily Sterrhinae

Scopula erebospila is a moth of the family Geometridae. It is found in Australia (Queensland).
