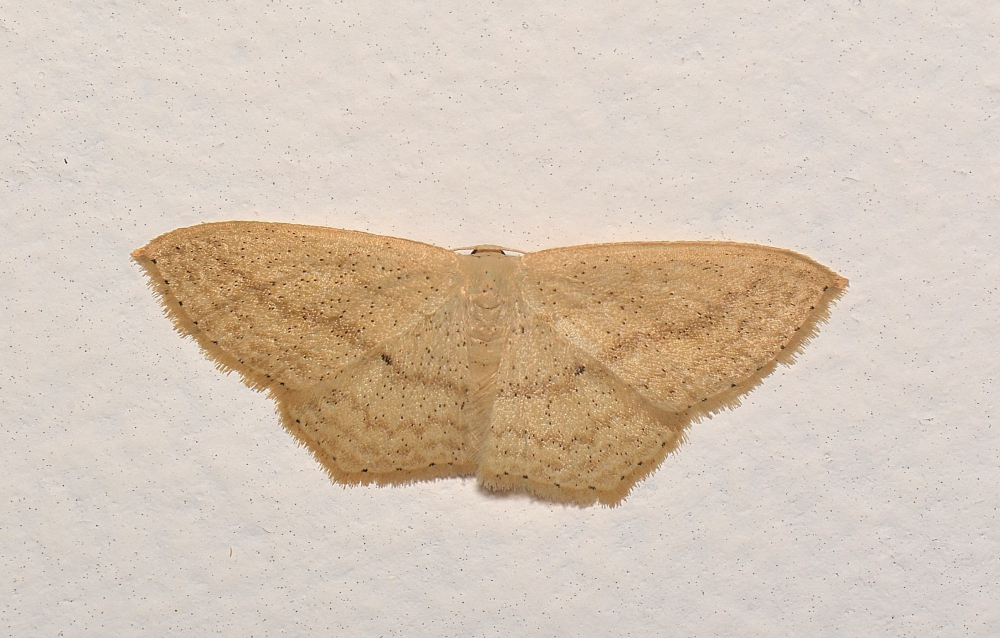

Scientific classification
- Kingdom: Animalia
- Phylum: Arthropoda
- Class: Insecta
- Order: Lepidoptera
- Family: Geometridae
- Genus: Scopula
- Species: S. liotis

Binomial name
- Scopula liotis (Meyrick, 1888)

Synonyms
- Acidalia liotis Meyrick, 1888; Acidalia compensata Walker, 1861

= Scopula liotis =

Species of geometer moth in subfamily Sterrhinae

Scopula liotis is a species of moth in the family Geometridae. It is found in Australia (New South Wales).
