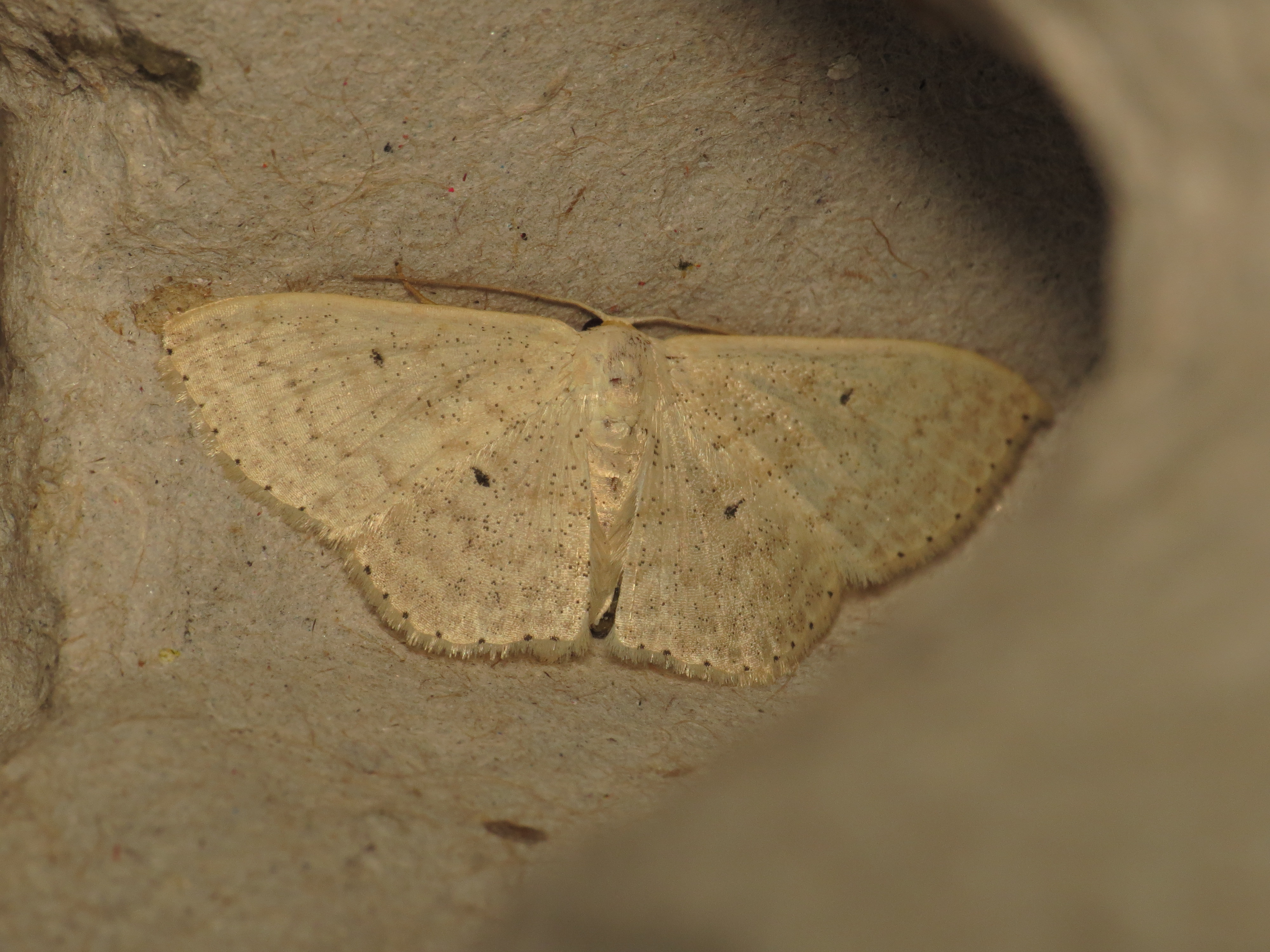

Scientific classification
- Domain: Eukaryota
- Kingdom: Animalia
- Phylum: Arthropoda
- Class: Insecta
- Order: Lepidoptera
- Family: Geometridae
- Genus: Scopula
- Species: S. prosoeca

Binomial name
- Scopula prosoeca (Turner, 1908)

Synonyms
- Leptomeris prosoeca Turner, 1908

= Scopula prosoeca =

Species of geometer moth in subfamily Sterrhinae

Scopula prosoeca is a moth of the family Geometridae. It is found in Australia (Queensland).
