= Eupithecia tornolopha =

Scientific classification
- Domain: Eukaryota
- Kingdom: Animalia
- Phylum: Arthropoda
- Class: Insecta
- Order: Lepidoptera
- Family: Geometridae
- Genus: Eupithecia
- Species: E. tornolopha

Binomial name
- Eupithecia tornolopha (Turner, 1942)

Synonyms
- Tephroclystia tornolopha Turner, 1942

Species of moth

Eupithecia tornolopha is a moth in the family Geometridae first described by Alfred Jefferis Turner in 1942. It is found in Australia.
