= Scopula episticta =

Scientific classification
- Domain: Eukaryota
- Kingdom: Animalia
- Phylum: Arthropoda
- Class: Insecta
- Order: Lepidoptera
- Family: Geometridae
- Genus: Scopula
- Species: S. episticta

Binomial name
- Scopula episticta Turner, 1942

Species of geometer moth in subfamily Sterrhinae

Scopula episticta is a moth of the family Geometridae found in northern Australia.
