= Scopula innocens =

Scientific classification
- Domain: Eukaryota
- Kingdom: Animalia
- Phylum: Arthropoda
- Class: Insecta
- Order: Lepidoptera
- Family: Geometridae
- Genus: Scopula
- Species: S. innocens

Binomial name
- Scopula innocens (Butler, 1886)

Synonyms
- Idaea innocens Butler, 1886

Species of geometer moth in subfamily Sterrhinae

Scopula innocens is a moth of the family Geometridae. It is found in Australia (Queensland).
