= Scopula episcia =

Scientific classification
- Domain: Eukaryota
- Kingdom: Animalia
- Phylum: Arthropoda
- Class: Insecta
- Order: Lepidoptera
- Family: Geometridae
- Genus: Scopula
- Species: S. episcia

Binomial name
- Scopula episcia (Meyrick, 1888)

Synonyms
- Acidalia episcia Meyrick, 1888

Species of geometer moth in subfamily Sterrhinae

Scopula episcia is a moth of the family Geometridae. It was described by Edward Meyrick in 1888. It is endemic to Australia.
