= Scopula castissima =

Scientific classification
- Kingdom: Animalia
- Phylum: Arthropoda
- Clade: Pancrustacea
- Class: Insecta
- Order: Lepidoptera
- Family: Geometridae
- Genus: Scopula
- Species: S. castissima

Binomial name
- Scopula castissima (Warren, 1897)

Synonyms
- Craspedia castissima Warren, 1897; Craspedia exangulata Warren, 1899

Species of geometer moth in subfamily Sterrhinae

Scopula castissima is a moth of the family Geometridae. It was described by Warren in 1897. It is endemic to Australia.
