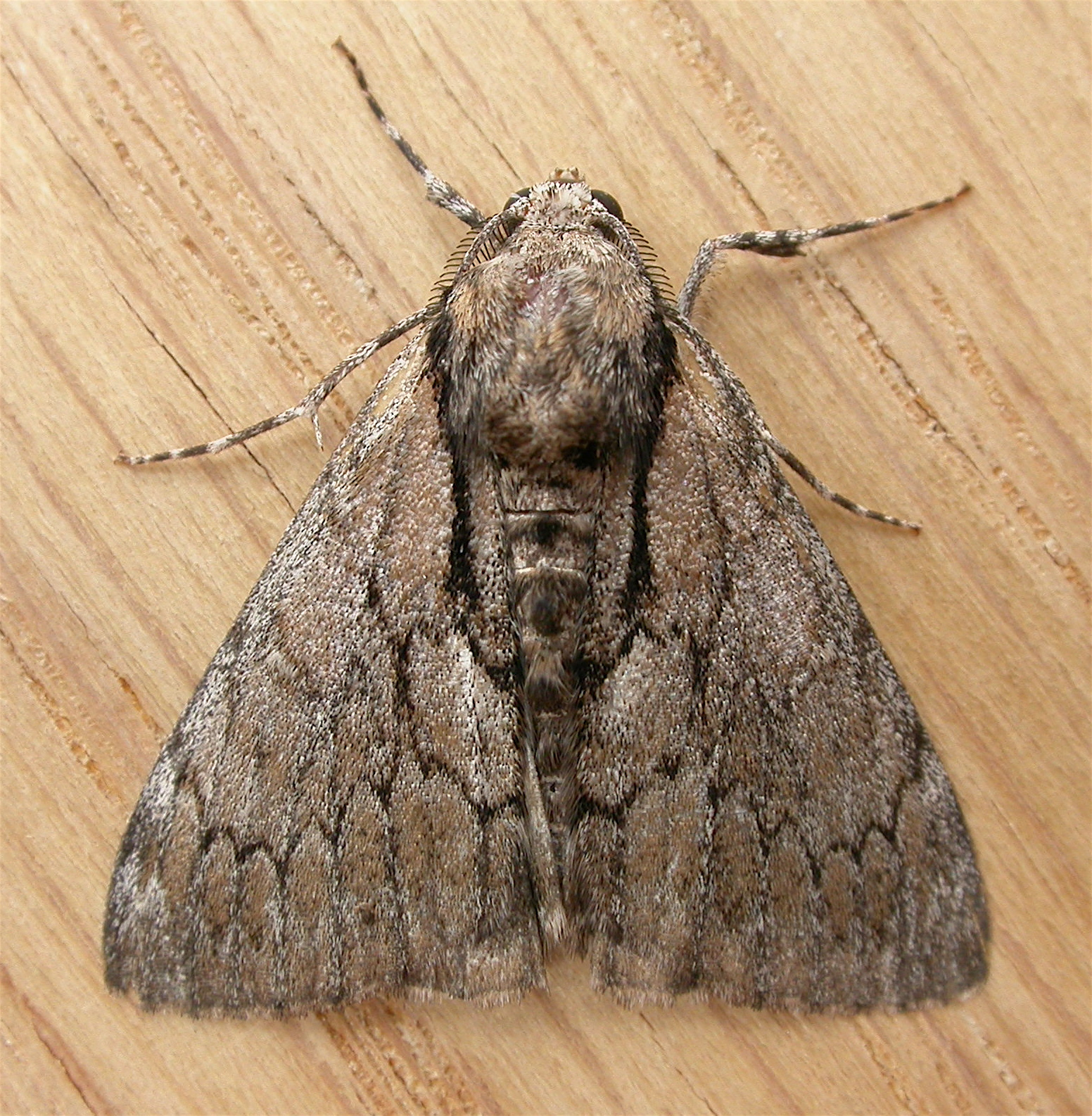

Scientific classification
- Kingdom: Animalia
- Phylum: Arthropoda
- Class: Insecta
- Order: Lepidoptera
- Family: Geometridae
- Genus: Rhuma
- Species: R. argyraspis

Binomial name
- Rhuma argyraspis (Lower, 1893)

Synonyms
- Sterictopsis argyraspis Lower, 1893; Sterictopsis inconsequens Warren, 1898

= Rhuma argyraspis =

Species of moth

Rhuma argyraspis is a moth of the family Geometridae first described by Oswald Bertram Lower in 1893. It is found in Australia, including Queensland.

The wingspan is about 30 mm.

The larvae feed on Eucalyptus species, including Eucalyptus odorata.
