= Protophyta castanea =

Scientific classification
- Kingdom: Animalia
- Phylum: Arthropoda
- Class: Insecta
- Order: Lepidoptera
- Family: Geometridae
- Genus: Protophyta
- Species: P. castanea

Binomial name
- Protophyta castanea (Lower, 1898)

Synonyms
- Pseudoterpna castanea Lower, 1898

Species of moth

Protophyta castanea is a moth of the family Geometridae first described by Oswald Bertram Lower in 1898. It is found in New South Wales, Australia.
