= Scopula oppilata =

Scientific classification
- Kingdom: Animalia
- Phylum: Arthropoda
- Class: Insecta
- Order: Lepidoptera
- Family: Geometridae
- Genus: Scopula
- Species: S. oppilata

Binomial name
- Scopula oppilata (Walker, 1861)

Synonyms
- Acidalia oppilata Walker, 1861; Acidalia crossophragma Meyrick, 1886; Acidalia stipataria Walker, 1861

Species of geometer moth in subfamily Sterrhinae

Scopula oppilata is a moth of the family Geometridae. It is found in Australia (Queensland) and New Guinea.
