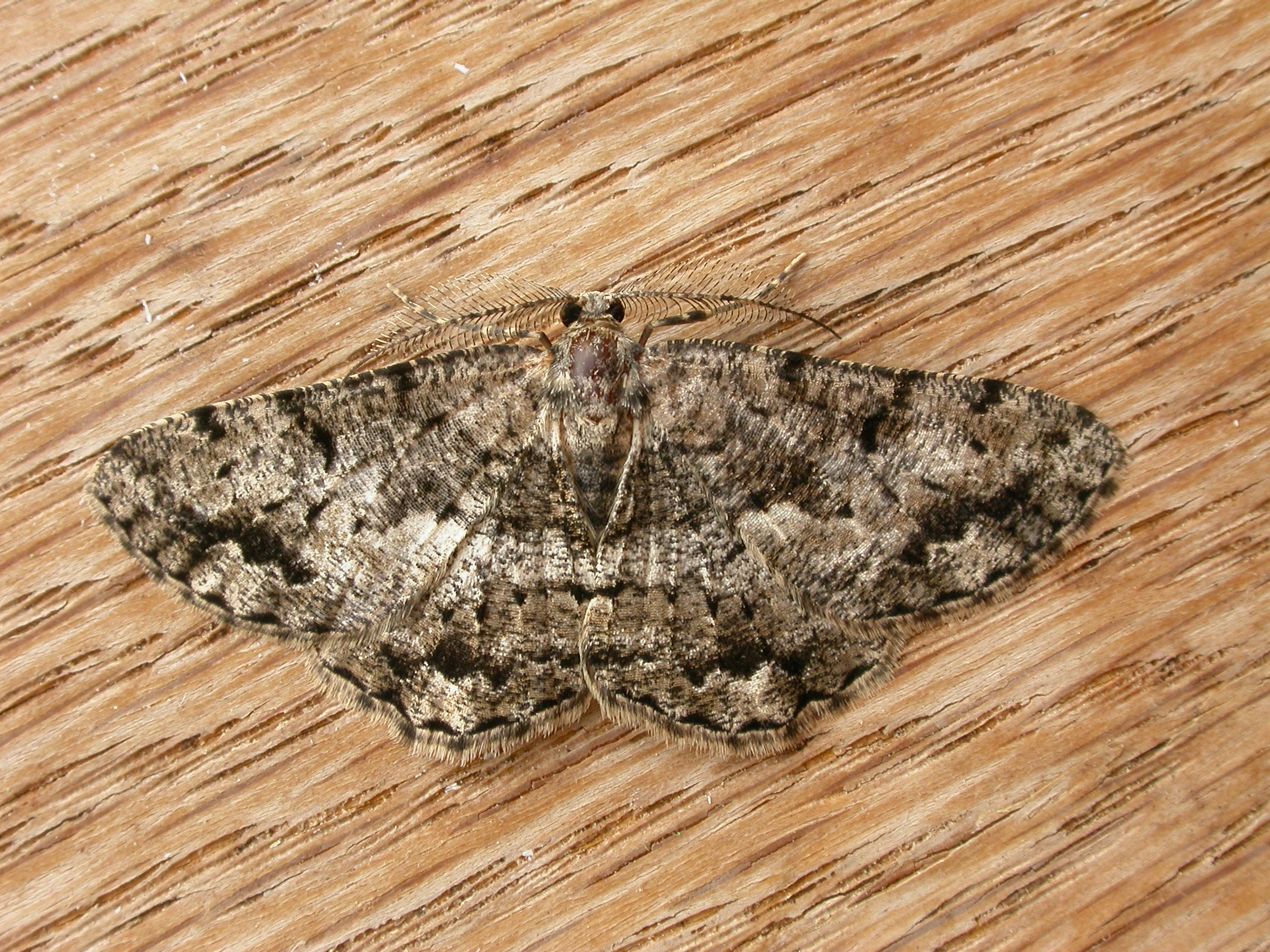

Scientific classification
- Kingdom: Animalia
- Phylum: Arthropoda
- Class: Insecta
- Order: Lepidoptera
- Family: Geometridae
- Genus: Tephrosia
- Species: T. externaria

Binomial name
- Tephrosia externaria Walker, 1866

Synonyms
- Cleora chionospila Turner, 1947

= Tephrosia externaria =

Species of moth

Tephrosia externaria is a moth of the family Geometridae first described by Francis Walker in 1866. It is known from Australia.
