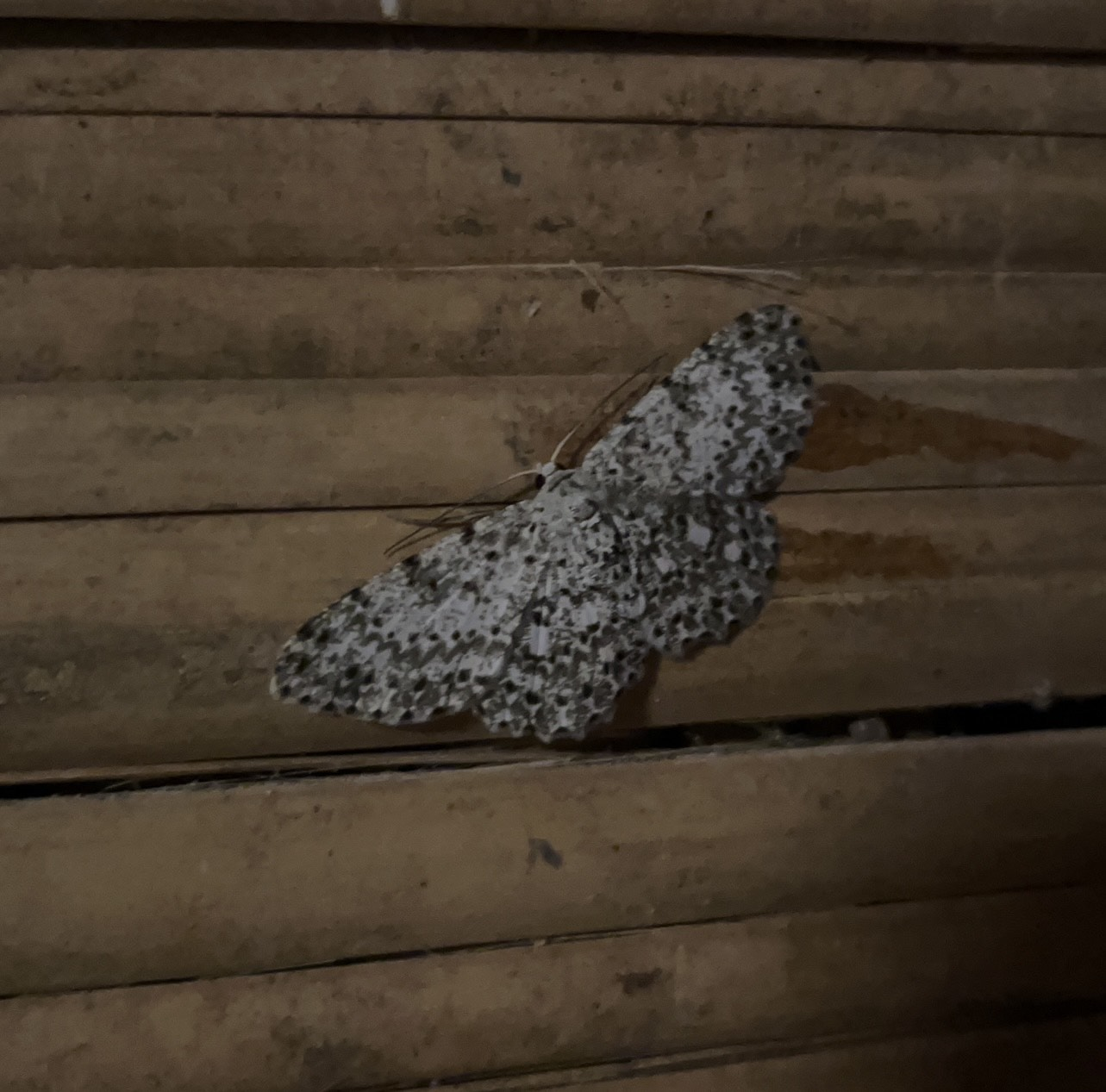
- Female

Scientific classification
- Domain: Eukaryota
- Kingdom: Animalia
- Phylum: Arthropoda
- Class: Insecta
- Order: Lepidoptera
- Family: Geometridae
- Genus: Thallogama
- Species: T. corticola

Binomial name
- Thallogama corticola (Goldfinch, 1944)

= Thallogama corticola =

Species of moth

Thallogama corticola, also known as the chequered bark moth and the mycelium moth, is a species of moth found in Australia, with some reports of sightings in Fiji.

== Distribution ==
East Australia, Fiji Islands
