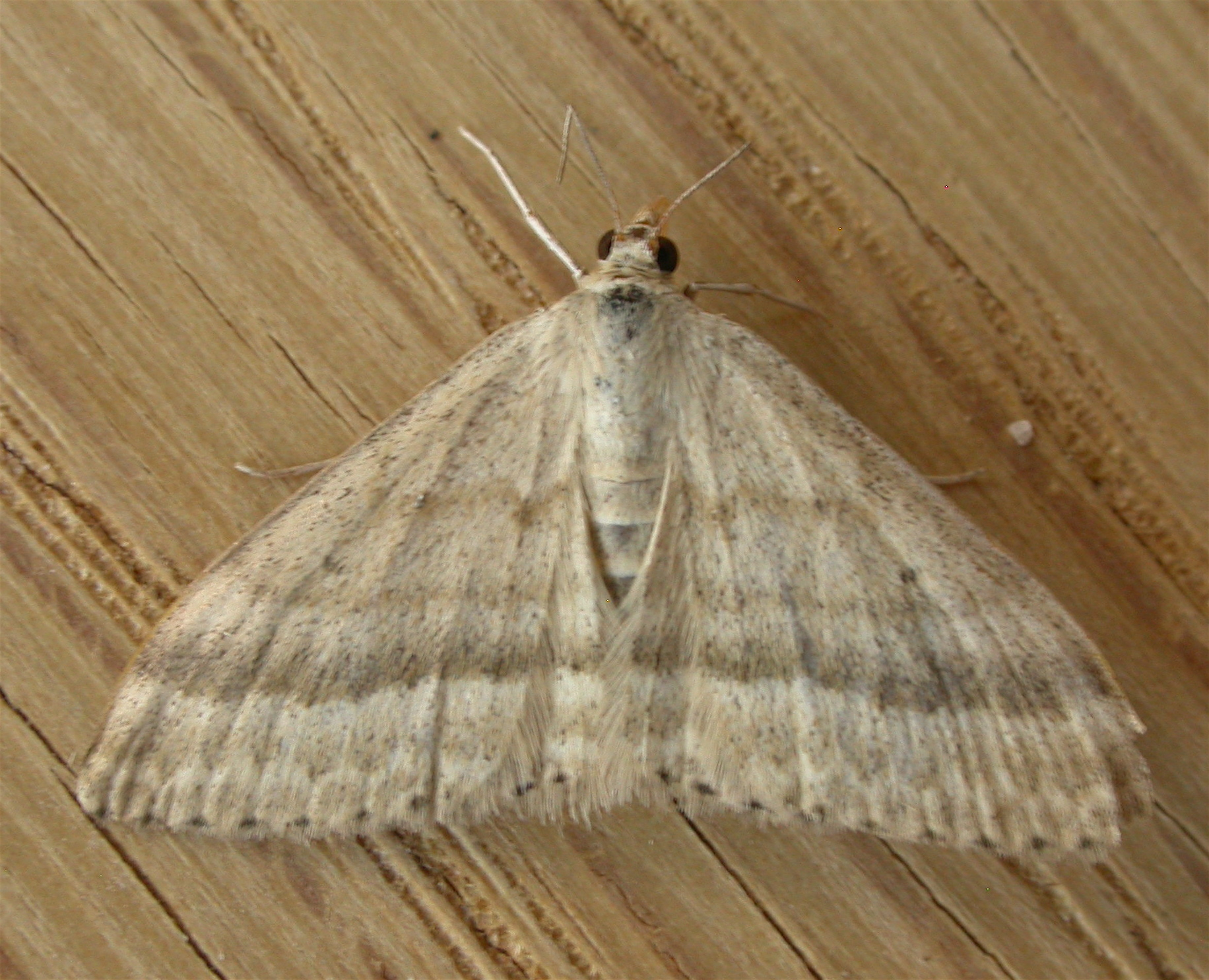

Scientific classification
- Domain: Eukaryota
- Kingdom: Animalia
- Phylum: Arthropoda
- Class: Insecta
- Order: Lepidoptera
- Family: Geometridae
- Genus: Scopula
- Species: S. lydia

Binomial name
- Scopula lydia (Butler, 1886)

Synonyms
- Idaea lydia Butler, 1886; Idaea jessica Butler, 1886; Acidalia prosaula Guest, 1887

= Scopula lydia =

Species of geometer moth in subfamily Sterrhinae

Scopula lydia is a species of moth of the family Geometridae. It was described by Arthur Gardiner Butler in 1886. It is endemic to Australia.
