= Dithalama desueta =

Scientific classification
- Kingdom: Animalia
- Phylum: Arthropoda
- Class: Insecta
- Order: Lepidoptera
- Family: Geometridae
- Genus: Dithalama
- Species: D. desueta

Binomial name
- Dithalama desueta (Warren, 1902)

Synonyms
- Lycauges desueta Warren, 1902

Species of moth

Dithalama desueta is a moth of the family Geometridae. It is found in Western Australia.
