= Scopula orthoscia =

Scientific classification
- Kingdom: Animalia
- Phylum: Arthropoda
- Clade: Pancrustacea
- Class: Insecta
- Order: Lepidoptera
- Family: Geometridae
- Genus: Scopula
- Species: S. orthoscia

Binomial name
- Scopula orthoscia (Meyrick, 1888)

Synonyms
- Acidalia orthoscia Meyrick, 1888

Species of geometer moth in subfamily Sterrhinae

Scopula orthoscia is a moth of the family Geometridae. It was described by Edward Meyrick in 1888. It is found in western Australia.
