= Scopula loxosema =

Scientific classification
- Domain: Eukaryota
- Kingdom: Animalia
- Phylum: Arthropoda
- Class: Insecta
- Order: Lepidoptera
- Family: Geometridae
- Genus: Scopula
- Species: S. loxosema

Binomial name
- Scopula loxosema (Turner, 1908)

Synonyms
- Pylarge loxosema Turner, 1908

Species of geometer moth in subfamily Sterrhinae

Scopula loxosema is a moth of the family Geometridae. It was described by Turner in 1908. It is found in Australia (Victoria).
