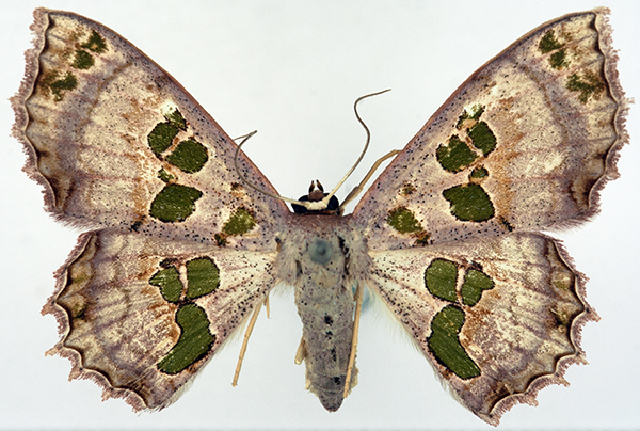

Scientific classification
- Domain: Eukaryota
- Kingdom: Animalia
- Phylum: Arthropoda
- Class: Insecta
- Order: Lepidoptera
- Family: Geometridae
- Genus: Scopula
- Species: S. parvimacula

Binomial name
- Scopula parvimacula (Warren, 1896)

Synonyms
- Antitrygodes parvimacula Warren, 1896

= Scopula parvimacula =

Species of geometer moth in subfamily Sterrhinae

Scopula parvimacula is a moth of the family Geometridae. It is found in New Guinea and Australia (Queensland).

== Subspecies ==
- Scopula parvimacula parvimacula
- Scopula parvimacula erythroconia (Prout, 1938)
- Scopula parvimacula kirwiriensis (Prout, 1938)
- Scopula parvimacula papuana (Prout, 1938)
- Scopula parvimacula privativa (Prout, 1917)
