= Scopula didymosema =

Scientific classification
- Domain: Eukaryota
- Kingdom: Animalia
- Phylum: Arthropoda
- Class: Insecta
- Order: Lepidoptera
- Family: Geometridae
- Genus: Scopula
- Species: S. didymosema

Binomial name
- Scopula didymosema (Lower, 1893)

Synonyms
- Acidalia didymosema Lower, 1893

Species of geometer moth in subfamily Sterrhinae

Scopula didymosema is a moth of the family Geometridae. It is found in southern Australia.
