= Scopula perlata =

Scientific classification
- Kingdom: Animalia
- Phylum: Arthropoda
- Clade: Pancrustacea
- Class: Insecta
- Order: Lepidoptera
- Family: Geometridae
- Genus: Scopula
- Species: S. perlata

Binomial name
- Scopula perlata (Walker, 1861)

Synonyms
- Acidalia perlata Walker, 1861; Acidalia recessata Walker, 1861

Species of geometer moth in subfamily Sterrhinae

Scopula perlata, the cream wave, is a moth of the family Geometridae. The species was first described by Francis Walker in 1861. It is found in Australia (including Tasmania, New South Wales, South Australia and Victoria), as well as Indonesia.

The wingspan is about 20 mm.

The larvae have been reared on Myosotis arvensis.
