= Eupithecia scotodes =

Scientific classification
- Domain: Eukaryota
- Kingdom: Animalia
- Phylum: Arthropoda
- Class: Insecta
- Order: Lepidoptera
- Family: Geometridae
- Genus: Eupithecia
- Species: E. scotodes

Binomial name
- Eupithecia scotodes (Turner, 1904)

Synonyms
- Eucymatoge scotodes Turner, 1904

Species of moth

Eupithecia scotodes is a moth in the family Geometridae. It is generally, but not exclusively, found in Australia.
