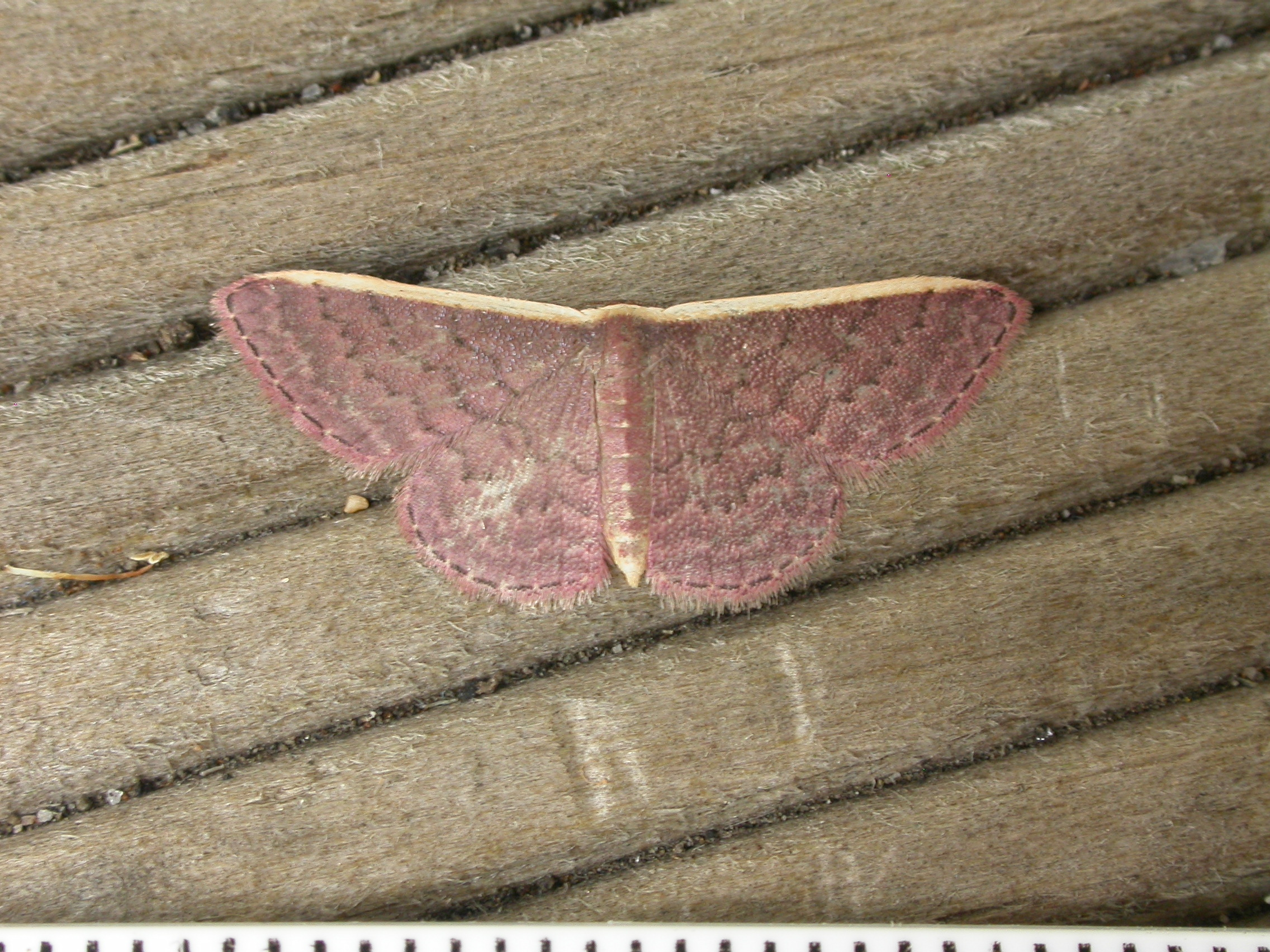

Scientific classification
- Kingdom: Animalia
- Phylum: Arthropoda
- Clade: Pancrustacea
- Class: Insecta
- Order: Lepidoptera
- Family: Geometridae
- Genus: Idaea
- Species: I. inversata

Binomial name
- Idaea inversata Guenée, 1857

Synonyms
- Acidalia albicostata

= Idaea inversata =

Purple wave

Species of moth

Idaea inversata, the purple wave, is a moth of the family Geometridae. The species was first described by Achille Guenée in 1857. It is found along the east coast of Australia.

Idaea inversata is externally very similar to I. costaria but lacks the two-coloured head pattern of that species. I. costaria has a creamy-white patch between the antennae, whereas I. inversata is dark reddish throughout this area.
