= Scopula poliodesma =

Scientific classification
- Domain: Eukaryota
- Kingdom: Animalia
- Phylum: Arthropoda
- Class: Insecta
- Order: Lepidoptera
- Family: Geometridae
- Genus: Scopula
- Species: S. poliodesma

Binomial name
- Scopula poliodesma (Turner, 1908)

Synonyms
- Autanepsia poliodesma Turner, 1908

Species of geometer moth in subfamily Sterrhinae

Scopula poliodesma is a moth of the family Geometridae. It is found in Australia.
