= Scopula microphylla =

Scientific classification
- Kingdom: Animalia
- Phylum: Arthropoda
- Clade: Pancrustacea
- Class: Insecta
- Order: Lepidoptera
- Family: Geometridae
- Genus: Scopula
- Species: S. microphylla

Binomial name
- Scopula microphylla (Meyrick, 1889)

Synonyms
- Prasonesis microphylla Meyrick, 1889; Somatina microphylla; Trygodes catacissa Turner, 1908

Species of geometer moth in subfamily Sterrhinae

Scopula microphylla is a moth of the family Geometridae. It is found in Australia (Queensland).

Adults are pale brown with curved dark green patches.
