= Scopula argillina =

Scientific classification
- Kingdom: Animalia
- Phylum: Arthropoda
- Clade: Pancrustacea
- Class: Insecta
- Order: Lepidoptera
- Family: Geometridae
- Genus: Scopula
- Species: S. argillina

Binomial name
- Scopula argillina (Lower, 1915)

Synonyms
- Emmiltis argillina Lower, 1915; Dasybela argillina

Species of geometer moth in subfamily Sterrhinae

Scopula argillina is a moth of the family Geometridae. It was described by Oswald Bertram Lower in 1915. It is endemic to Australia.
