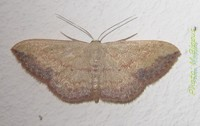

Scientific classification
- Kingdom: Animalia
- Phylum: Arthropoda
- Class: Insecta
- Order: Lepidoptera
- Family: Geometridae
- Genus: Scopula
- Species: S. caesaria

Binomial name
- Scopula caesaria (Walker, 1861)

Synonyms
- Acidalia caesaria Walker, 1861; Acidalia caesarea Fuchs, 1902; Acidalia faeculentaria Mabille, 1880; Acidalia obturbata Walker, 1861; Acidalia perfectaria Mabille, 1880; Acidalia rufimixtaria Warren, 1900

= Scopula caesaria =

Species of geometer moth in subfamily Sterrhinae

Scopula caesaria is a moth of the family Geometridae. It has a wide range, including the Comoros, Mayotte, La Réunion, Madagascar and in Mauritius, Nigeria, South Africa, Tanzania, Gambia, Oman, the United Arab Emirates, New Guinea, Taiwan, Japan and Australia (Queensland).

Adults of have brown wings with red zigzag markings.

== Subspecies ==
- Scopula caesaria caesaria
- Scopula caesaria walkeros Wiltshire, [1981] (Oman, United Arab Emirates)
