= Dithalama punctilinea =

Scientific classification
- Kingdom: Animalia
- Phylum: Arthropoda
- Class: Insecta
- Order: Lepidoptera
- Family: Geometridae
- Genus: Dithalama
- Species: D. punctilinea

Binomial name
- Dithalama punctilinea (C. Swinhoe, 1902)

Synonyms
- Sterrha punctilinea C. Swinhoe, 1902; Leptomeris tetrasticha Lower, 1902

Species of moth

Dithalama punctilinea is a moth of the family Geometridae first described by Charles Swinhoe in 1902. It is found in Western Australia.
