= Scopula lechrioloma =

Scientific classification
- Domain: Eukaryota
- Kingdom: Animalia
- Phylum: Arthropoda
- Class: Insecta
- Order: Lepidoptera
- Family: Geometridae
- Genus: Scopula
- Species: S. lechrioloma

Binomial name
- Scopula lechrioloma (Turner, 1908)

Synonyms
- Leptomeris lechrioloma Turner, 1908

Species of geometer moth in subfamily Sterrhinae

Scopula lechrioloma is a moth of the family Geometridae. It was described by Turner in 1908. It is found in Queensland, Australia.
