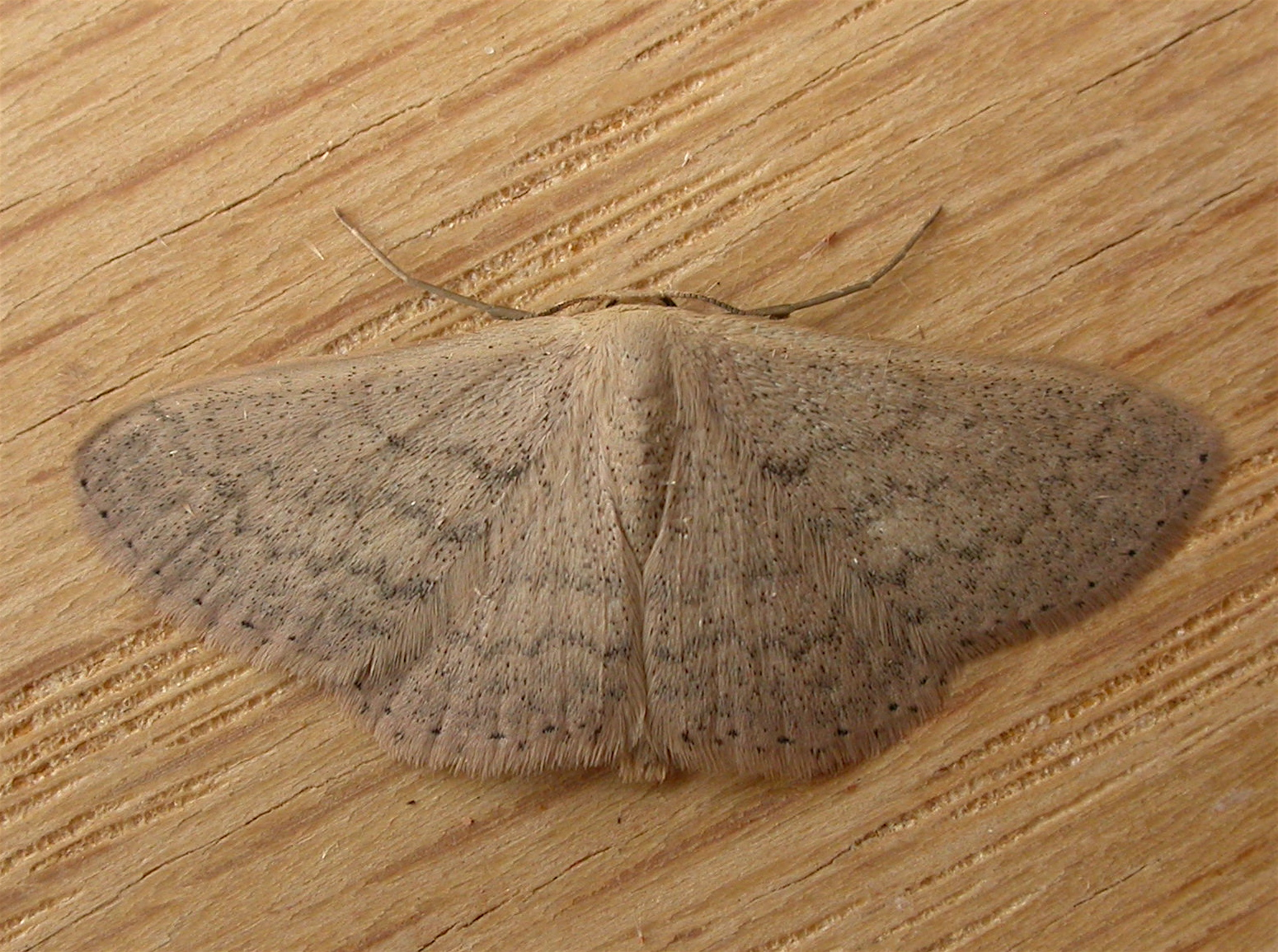

Scientific classification
- Kingdom: Animalia
- Phylum: Arthropoda
- Class: Insecta
- Order: Lepidoptera
- Family: Geometridae
- Genus: Scopula
- Species: S. optivata

Binomial name
- Scopula optivata (Walker, 1861)

Synonyms
- Acidalia optivata Walker, 1861

= Scopula optivata =

Species of geometer moth in subfamily Sterrhinae

Scopula optivata is a species of moth of the family Geometridae. It is found in Australia, including Tasmania.

== Subspecies ==
- Scopula optivata optivata
- Scopula optivata youngi Holloway, 1977 (Norfolk Island)
