= Scopula coenona =

Scientific classification
- Kingdom: Animalia
- Phylum: Arthropoda
- Clade: Pancrustacea
- Class: Insecta
- Order: Lepidoptera
- Family: Geometridae
- Genus: Scopula
- Species: S. coenona

Binomial name
- Scopula coenona (Turner, 1908)

Synonyms
- Leptomeris coenona Turner, 1908

Species of geometer moth in subfamily Sterrhinae

Scopula coenona is a moth of the family Geometridae. It was described by Alfred Jefferis Turner in 1908. It is endemic to Australia.
