= Scopula neoxesta =

Scientific classification
- Kingdom: Animalia
- Phylum: Arthropoda
- Class: Insecta
- Order: Lepidoptera
- Family: Geometridae
- Genus: Scopula
- Species: S. neoxesta

Binomial name
- Scopula neoxesta (Meyrick, 1888)

Synonyms
- Acidalia neoxesta Meyrick, 1888

Species of geometer moth in subfamily Sterrhinae

Scopula neoxesta is a moth of the family Geometridae. It is found in Australia (Queensland).
