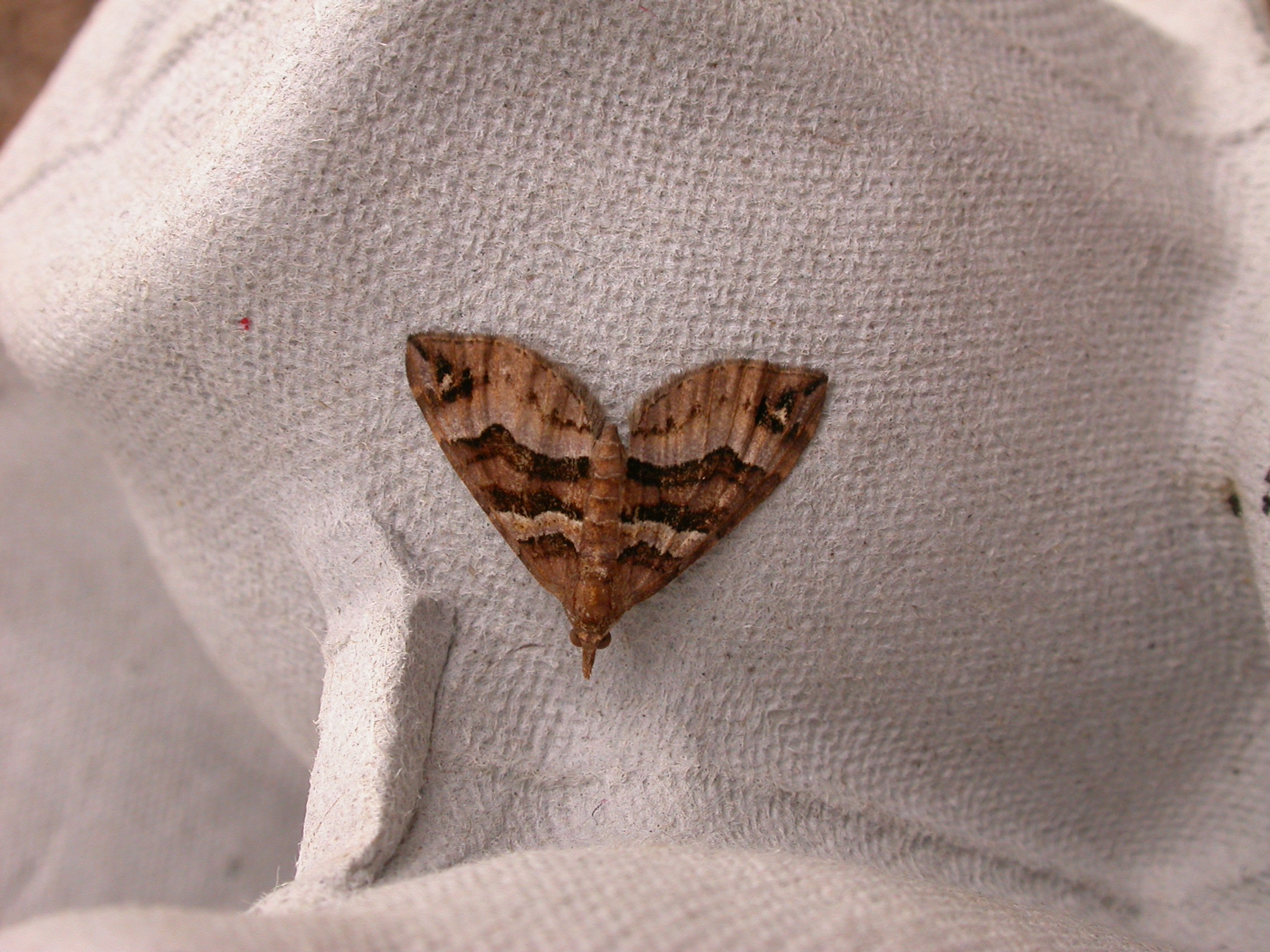

Scientific classification
- Kingdom: Animalia
- Phylum: Arthropoda
- Clade: Pancrustacea
- Class: Insecta
- Order: Lepidoptera
- Family: Geometridae
- Genus: Chaetolopha
- Species: C. emporias

Binomial name
- Chaetolopha emporias (Turner, 1904)

Synonyms
- Scordylia emporias Turner, 1904; Scordylia pteridophila Turner, 1907; Scotocyma pteridophila

= Chaetolopha emporias =

Species of moth

Chaetolopha emporias is a moth of the family Geometridae. It is known from Australia, including Queensland and Tasmania.

The larvae are thought to feed on various Polypodiophyta species.
