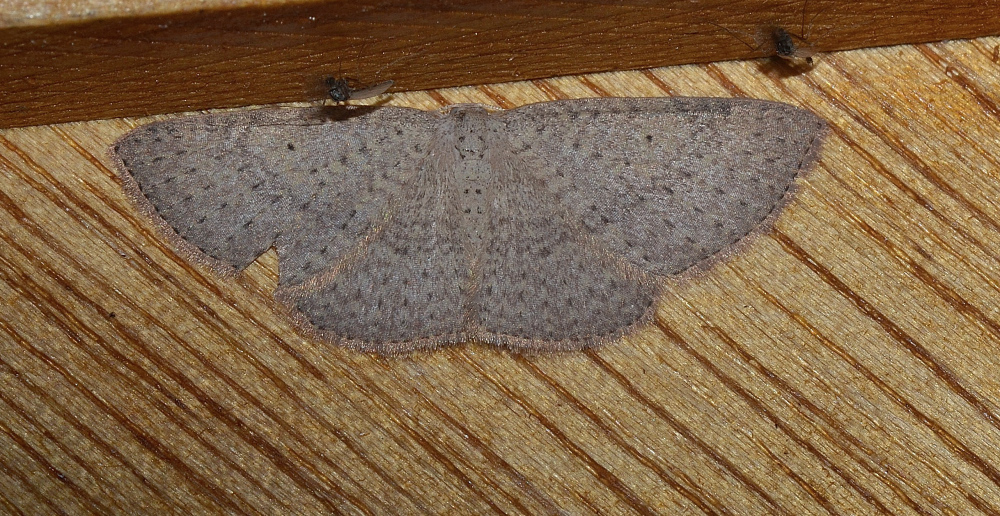

Scientific classification
- Domain: Eukaryota
- Kingdom: Animalia
- Phylum: Arthropoda
- Class: Insecta
- Order: Lepidoptera
- Family: Geometridae
- Genus: Poecilasthena
- Species: P. ischnophrica

Binomial name
- Poecilasthena ischnophrica Turner, 1941

Synonyms
- Scotocyma ischnophrica

= Poecilasthena ischnophrica =

Species of moth

Poecilasthena ischnophrica is a moth in the family Geometridae. It is found in Australia, including Western Australia.
