= Lophothorax =

Scientific classification
- Kingdom: Animalia
- Phylum: Arthropoda
- Class: Insecta
- Order: Lepidoptera
- Family: Geometridae
- Tribe: Pseudoterpnini
- Genus: Lophothorax; Turner, 1939
- Species: L. eremnopis

Binomial name
- Lophothorax eremnopis (Turner, 1922)

Synonyms
- Crypsiphona eremnopis Turner, 1922; Lophothorax alamphodes Turner, 1939

Genus of moths

Lophothorax is a monotypic moth genus in the family Geometridae. It consists of only one species, Lophothorax eremnopis, which is found in Australia (South Australia and Western Australia). Both the genus and the species were first described by Alfred Jefferis Turner, the species in 1922 and the genus in 1939.

The larvae feed on Dodonaea bursariifolia.
