= Dindicodes euclidiaria =

Scientific classification
- Kingdom: Animalia
- Phylum: Arthropoda
- Class: Insecta
- Order: Lepidoptera
- Family: Geometridae
- Genus: Dindicodes
- Species: D. euclidiaria

Binomial name
- Dindicodes euclidiaria (Oberthür, 1913)

Synonyms
- Hypochroma euclidiaria Oberthür, 1913; Terpna euclidiaria

Species of moth

Dindicodes euclidiaria is a moth of the family Geometridae first described by Charles Oberthür in 1913. It is found in Tibet.
