= Epipristis oxycyma =

Scientific classification
- Kingdom: Animalia
- Phylum: Arthropoda
- Class: Insecta
- Order: Lepidoptera
- Family: Geometridae
- Genus: Epipristis
- Species: E. oxycyma

Binomial name
- Epipristis oxycyma Meyrick, 1888

Synonyms
- Epipristis australis Goldfinch, 1929

Species of moth

Epipristis oxycyma is a moth of the family Geometridae first described by Edward Meyrick in 1888. It is found in Queensland, Australia.
