= Hypodoxa multicolor =

Scientific classification
- Kingdom: Animalia
- Phylum: Arthropoda
- Class: Insecta
- Order: Lepidoptera
- Family: Geometridae
- Genus: Hypodoxa
- Species: H. multicolor

Binomial name
- Hypodoxa multicolor (Warren, 1899)

Synonyms
- Hypochroma multicolor Warren, 1899; Hypodoxa multicolor circumsepta Prout, 1913; Hypodoxa circumsepta

Species of moth

Hypodoxa multicolor is a moth of the family Geometridae first described by William Warren in 1899. It is found in Australia and New Guinea.
