= Dindicodes albodavidaria =

Scientific classification
- Kingdom: Animalia
- Phylum: Arthropoda
- Class: Insecta
- Order: Lepidoptera
- Family: Geometridae
- Genus: Dindicodes
- Species: D. albodavidaria

Binomial name
- Dindicodes albodavidaria (Xue, 1992)

Synonyms
- Hypochroma albodavidaria Xue, 1992

Species of moth

Dindicodes albodavidaria is a moth of the family Geometridae first described by Xue in 1992. It is found in China.
