= Dindicodes costiflavens =

Scientific classification
- Kingdom: Animalia
- Phylum: Arthropoda
- Class: Insecta
- Order: Lepidoptera
- Family: Geometridae
- Genus: Dindicodes
- Species: D. costiflavens

Binomial name
- Dindicodes costiflavens (Wehrli, 1933)

Synonyms
- Terpna costiflavens Wehrli, 1933; Pachyodes costiflavens

Species of moth

Dindicodes costiflavens is a moth of the family Geometridae first described by Eugen Wehrli in 1933. It is found in western China.
