= Cyneoterpna alpina =

Scientific classification
- Kingdom: Animalia
- Phylum: Arthropoda
- Class: Insecta
- Order: Lepidoptera
- Family: Geometridae
- Genus: Cyneoterpna
- Species: C. alpina

Binomial name
- Cyneoterpna alpina Goldfinch, 1929

Species of moth

Cyneoterpna alpina, the alpine grey, is a moth of the family Geometridae. The species was first described by Gilbert M. Goldfinch in 1929 It is found in the Australian state of New South Wales.
