= Dindicodes davidaria =

Scientific classification
- Kingdom: Animalia
- Phylum: Arthropoda
- Class: Insecta
- Order: Lepidoptera
- Family: Geometridae
- Genus: Dindicodes
- Species: D. davidaria

Binomial name
- Dindicodes davidaria (Poujade, 1895)

Synonyms
- Pachyodes davidaria Poujade, 1895; Terpna davidaria

Species of moth

Dindicodes davidaria is a moth of the family Geometridae first described by Gustave Arthur Poujade in 1895. It is found in western China.
