= Metallolophia albescens =

Scientific classification
- Kingdom: Animalia
- Phylum: Arthropoda
- Class: Insecta
- Order: Lepidoptera
- Family: Geometridae
- Genus: Metallolophia
- Species: M. albescens

Binomial name
- Metallolophia albescens Inoue, 1992

Synonyms
- Metallolophia ostrumaria Xue, 1992

Species of moth

Metallolophia albescens is a moth of the family Geometridae. It is found in China (Hunan, Zhejiang, Yunnan, Guangdong).
