= Metallolophia variegata =

Scientific classification
- Kingdom: Animalia
- Phylum: Arthropoda
- Clade: Pancrustacea
- Class: Insecta
- Order: Lepidoptera
- Family: Geometridae
- Genus: Metallolophia
- Species: M. variegata

Binomial name
- Metallolophia variegata Holloway, 1996

Species of moth

Metallolophia variegata is a moth of the family Geometridae first described by Jeremy Daniel Holloway in 1996. It is found on Borneo. The habitat consists of lower montane forests.

The length of the forewings is 16–17 mm.
