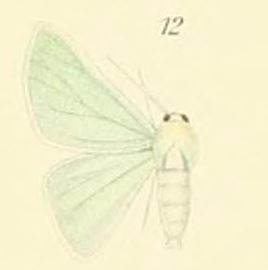

Scientific classification
- Kingdom: Animalia
- Phylum: Arthropoda
- Class: Insecta
- Order: Lepidoptera
- Family: Geometridae
- Genus: Holoterpna
- Species: H. pruinosata

Binomial name
- Holoterpna pruinosata (Staudinger, 1898)

Synonyms
- Eucrostis pruinosata Staudinger, 1898; Holoterpna foulquieri Oberthur, 1910

= Holoterpna pruinosata =

Species of moth

Holoterpna pruinosata is a moth of the family Geometridae first described by Otto Staudinger in 1898. It is found in Italy, North Macedonia, Turkey, the Levant and possibly western Iran.

The larvae feed on Ferulago galbanifera (syn. F. campestris) and Foeniculum species.
