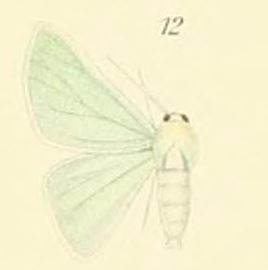

Scientific classification
- Kingdom: Animalia
- Phylum: Arthropoda
- Class: Insecta
- Order: Lepidoptera
- Family: Geometridae
- Tribe: Pseudoterpnini
- Genus: Holoterpna; Püngeler, 1900

= Holoterpna =

Genus of moths

Holoterpna is a genus of moths in the family Geometridae described by Rudolf Püngeler in 1900.

== Species ==
- Holoterpna diagrapharia Püngeler, 1900
- Holoterpna errata Prout, 1922
  - Holoterpna errata errata Prout, 1922
  - Holoterpna errata segnis Prout, 1930
- Holoterpna pruinosata (Staudinger, 1898)
