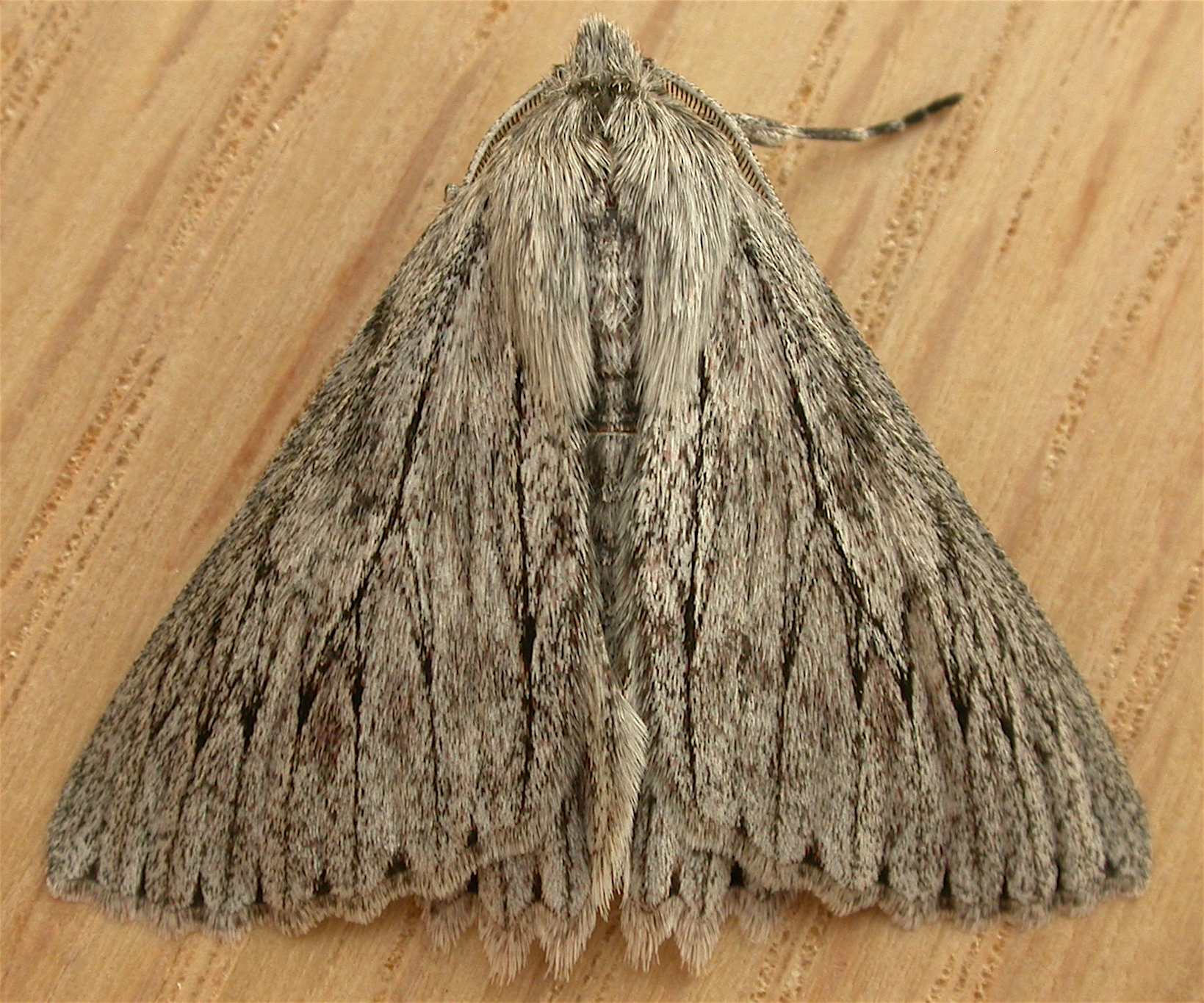
- Cyneoterpna wilsoni

Scientific classification
- Kingdom: Animalia
- Phylum: Arthropoda
- Class: Insecta
- Order: Lepidoptera
- Family: Geometridae
- Tribe: Pseudoterpnini
- Genus: Cyneoterpna; Prout, 1912

Synonyms
- Autanepsia Turner, 1910

= Cyneoterpna =

Genus of moths

Cyneoterpna is a genus of moths in the family Geometridae erected by Louis Beethoven Prout in 1912.

== Species ==
- Cyneoterpna alpina Goldfinch, 1929
- Cyneoterpna wilsoni (R. Felder & Rogenhofer, 1875)
