= Dindicodes crocina =

Scientific classification
- Kingdom: Animalia
- Phylum: Arthropoda
- Class: Insecta
- Order: Lepidoptera
- Family: Geometridae
- Genus: Dindicodes
- Species: D. crocina

Binomial name
- Dindicodes crocina (Butler, 1880)

Synonyms
- Hypochroma crocina Butler, 1880; Terpna crocina

Species of moth

Dindicodes crocina is a moth of the family Geometridae, first described by Arthur Gardiner Butler in 1880. It is found in northern India.
