= Metallolophia ocellata =

Scientific classification
- Kingdom: Animalia
- Phylum: Arthropoda
- Class: Insecta
- Order: Lepidoptera
- Family: Geometridae
- Genus: Metallolophia
- Species: M. ocellata

Binomial name
- Metallolophia ocellata (Warren, 1897)

Synonyms
- Terpna ocellata Warren, 1897

Species of moth

Metallolophia ocellata is a moth of the family Geometridae first described by William Warren in 1897. It is found in the Khasi Hills of India.
