= Hypodoxa conspurcata =

Scientific classification
- Kingdom: Animalia
- Phylum: Arthropoda
- Class: Insecta
- Order: Lepidoptera
- Family: Geometridae
- Genus: Hypodoxa
- Species: H. conspurcata

Binomial name
- Hypodoxa conspurcata (T. P. Lucas, 1898)

Synonyms
- Hypochroma conspurcata Turner, 1926; Pseudoterpna myriosticta Turner, 1904

Species of moth

Hypodoxa conspurcata is a moth of the family Geometridae first described by Thomas Pennington Lucas in 1898. It is found in Australia, including Queensland.
