= Crypsiphona melanosema =

Scientific classification
- Kingdom: Animalia
- Phylum: Arthropoda
- Class: Insecta
- Order: Lepidoptera
- Family: Geometridae
- Genus: Crypsiphona
- Species: C. melanosema

Binomial name
- Crypsiphona melanosema Meyrick, 1888

Species of moth

Crypsiphona melanosema is a moth of the family Geometridae first described by Edward Meyrick in 1888. It is found in Australia.
