= Metallolophia =

Scientific classification
- Kingdom: Animalia
- Phylum: Arthropoda
- Class: Insecta
- Order: Lepidoptera
- Family: Geometridae
- Subfamily: Geometrinae
- Tribe: Pseudoterpnini
- Genus: Metallolophia; Warren, 1895

Genus of moths

Metallolophia is a genus of moths in the family Geometridae described by William Warren in 1895.

== Species ==
- Metallolophia albescens Inoue, 1992 (=Metallolophia ostrumaria Xue, 1992)
- Metallolophia arenaria (Leech, 1889) (=Hypochroma danielaria Oberthür, 1913)
- Metallolophia assamensis Orhant, 2000
- Metallolophia cineracea Holloway, 1996
- Metallolophia cuneataria Han & Xue, [2004]
- Metallolophia devecisi Herbulot, 1989
- Metallolophia flavomaculata Han & Xue, [2004]
- Metallolophia inanularia Han & Xue, [2004]
- Metallolophia medullosa Inoue, 1988
- Metallolophia ocellata (Warren, 1897)
- Metallolophia opalina (Warren, 1893)
- Metallolophia purpurivenata Han & Xue, [2004]
- Metallolophia stueningi Han & Xue, [2004]
- Metallolophia subradiata (Warren, 1897)
- Metallolophia taleensis Sondhi et al., 2020
- Metallolophia variegata Holloway, 1996
- Metallolophia vitticosta (Walker, 1860)
