= Metallolophia medullosa =

Scientific classification
- Kingdom: Animalia
- Phylum: Arthropoda
- Class: Insecta
- Order: Lepidoptera
- Family: Geometridae
- Genus: Metallolophia
- Species: M. medullosa

Binomial name
- Metallolophia medullosa Inoue, 1988

Species of moth

Metallolophia medullosa is a moth of the family Geometridae first described by Hiroshi Inoue in 1988. It is found in the Philippines.
