= Hypodoxa ruptilinea =

Scientific classification
- Kingdom: Animalia
- Phylum: Arthropoda
- Class: Insecta
- Order: Lepidoptera
- Family: Geometridae
- Genus: Hypodoxa
- Species: H. ruptilinea

Binomial name
- Hypodoxa ruptilinea L. B. Prout, 1913

Species of moth

Hypodoxa ruptilinea is a moth of the family Geometridae first described by Louis Beethoven Prout in 1913. It is found on New Guinea.
