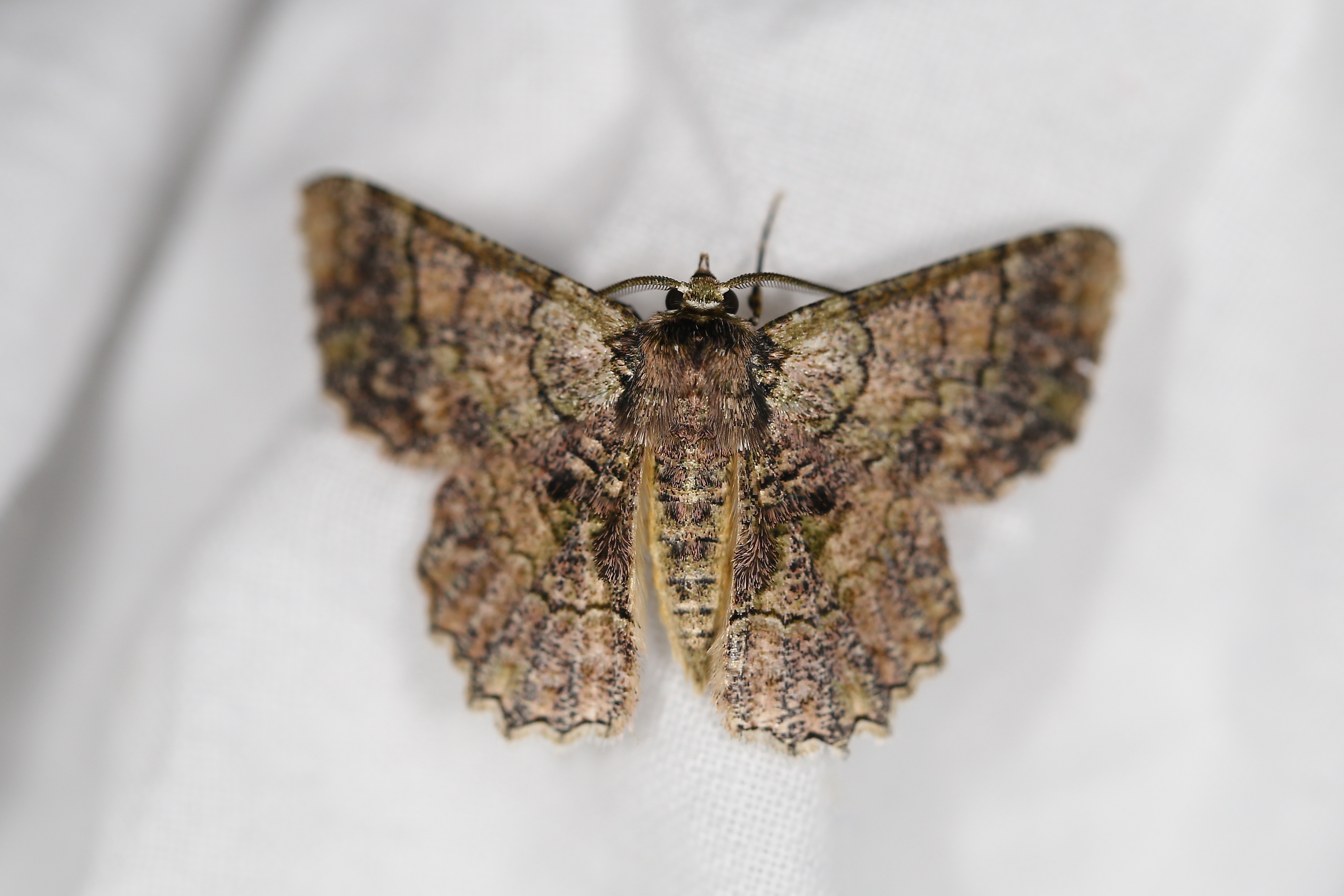

Scientific classification
- Kingdom: Animalia
- Phylum: Arthropoda
- Class: Insecta
- Order: Lepidoptera
- Family: Geometridae
- Genus: Hypodoxa
- Species: H. emiliaria

Binomial name
- Hypodoxa emiliaria (Guenée, [1858])

Synonyms
- Hypochroma emiliaria Guenée, [1858]; Hypochroma assidens Lucas, 1901; Hypochroma aurantiacea Lucas, 1891; Hypochroma subornata Warren, 1896; Pingasa talagi Swinhoe, 1917; Hypochroma basinigra Warren, 1902; Hypodoxa fulgurea Prout, 1913; Hypochroma purpurifera Warren, 1899; Hypochroma purpurissata Lucas, 1901; Hypodoxa subleprosa Prout, 1917

= Hypodoxa emiliaria =

Species of moth

Hypodoxa emiliaria is a moth of the family Geometridae first described by Achille Guenée in 1858. It is found in Australia, New Guinea and on the Solomon Islands.

== Subspecies ==
- Hypodoxa emiliaria emiliaria
- Hypodoxa emiliaria aignanensis Prout, 1916 (Louisiade Archipelago)
- Hypodoxa emiliaria basinigra (Warren, 1902) (Papua New Guinea)
- Hypodoxa emiliaria fulgurea Prout, 1913 (Irian Jaya)
- Hypodoxa emiliaria purpurifera (Warren, 1899) (Solomon Islands)
- Hypodoxa emiliaria purpurissata (Lucas, 1901) (Australia: Queensland)
- Hypodoxa emiliaria subleprosa Prout, 1917 (Louisiade Archipelago)
