= Limbatochlamys pararosthorni =

Scientific classification
- Kingdom: Animalia
- Phylum: Arthropoda
- Clade: Pancrustacea
- Class: Insecta
- Order: Lepidoptera
- Family: Geometridae
- Genus: Limbatochlamys
- Species: L. pararosthorni

Binomial name
- Limbatochlamys pararosthorni Han & Xue, 2005

Species of moth

Limbatochlamys pararosthorni is a moth of the family Geometridae first described by Hong-Xiang Han and Da-Yong Xue in 2005. It is found in China (Shaanxi, Gansu, Sichuan and Chongqing).

The length of the forewings is 30–32 mm for males and 33–34 mm for females.
