= Mictoschema tuckeri =

Scientific classification
- Kingdom: Animalia
- Phylum: Arthropoda
- Class: Insecta
- Order: Lepidoptera
- Family: Geometridae
- Genus: Mictoschema
- Species: M. tuckeri

Binomial name
- Mictoschema tuckeri L. B. Prout, 1925

Species of moth

Mictoschema tuckeri is a moth of the family Geometridae first described by Louis Beethoven Prout in 1925. It is found in Namibia.
