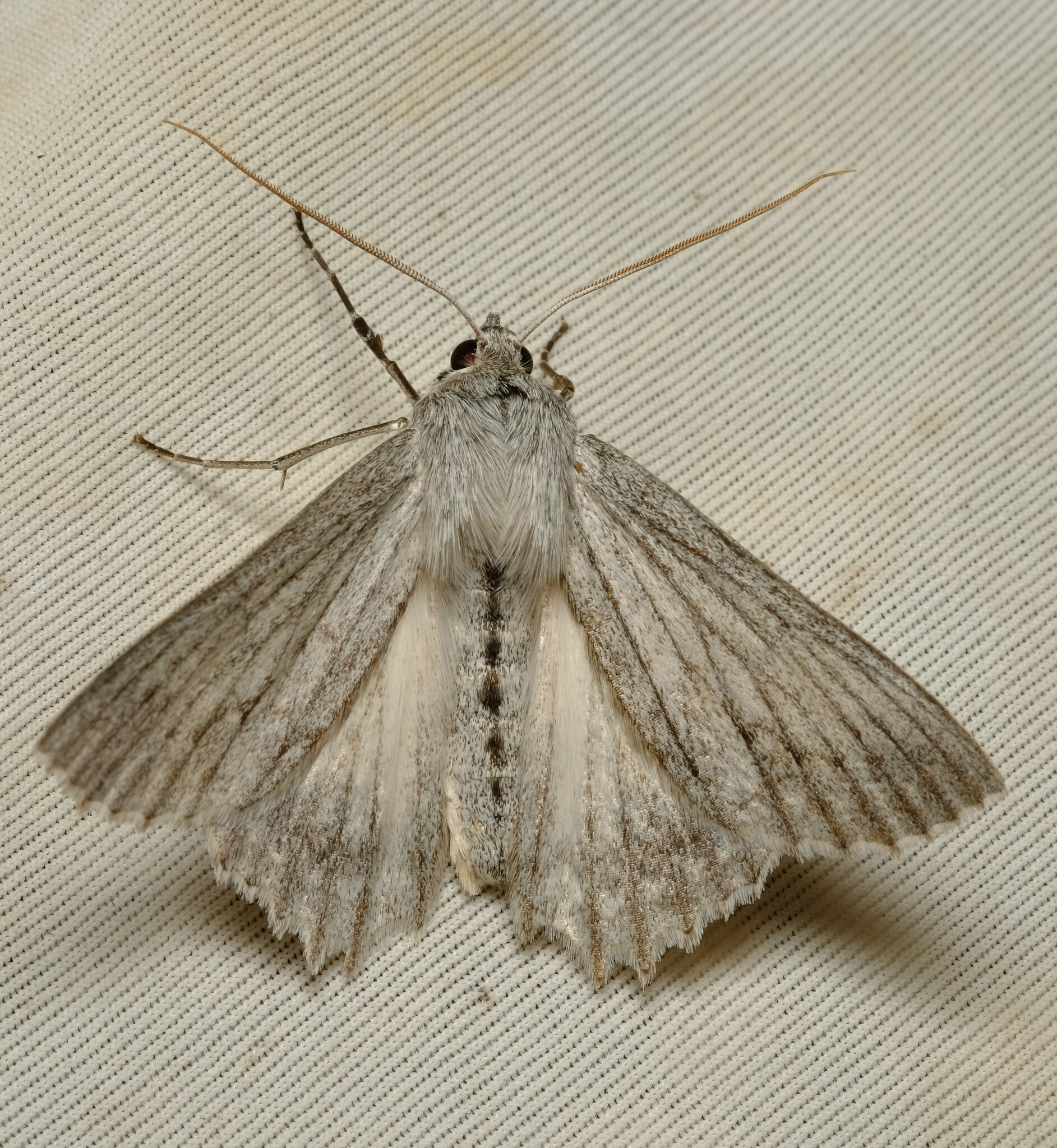

Scientific classification
- Kingdom: Animalia
- Phylum: Arthropoda
- Class: Insecta
- Order: Lepidoptera
- Family: Geometridae
- Tribe: Pseudoterpnini
- Genus: Paraterpna; Goldfinch, 1929
- Species: P. harrisoni

Binomial name
- Paraterpna harrisoni Goldfinch, 1929

= Paraterpna =

Paraterpna harrisoni

Genus of moths

Paraterpna is a monotypic moth genus in the family Geometridae. It consists of only one species, Paraterpna harrisoni, which is found in New South Wales, Australia. Both the genus and species were first described by Gilbert M. Goldfinch in 1929.

The larvae feed on Leptospermum species.
