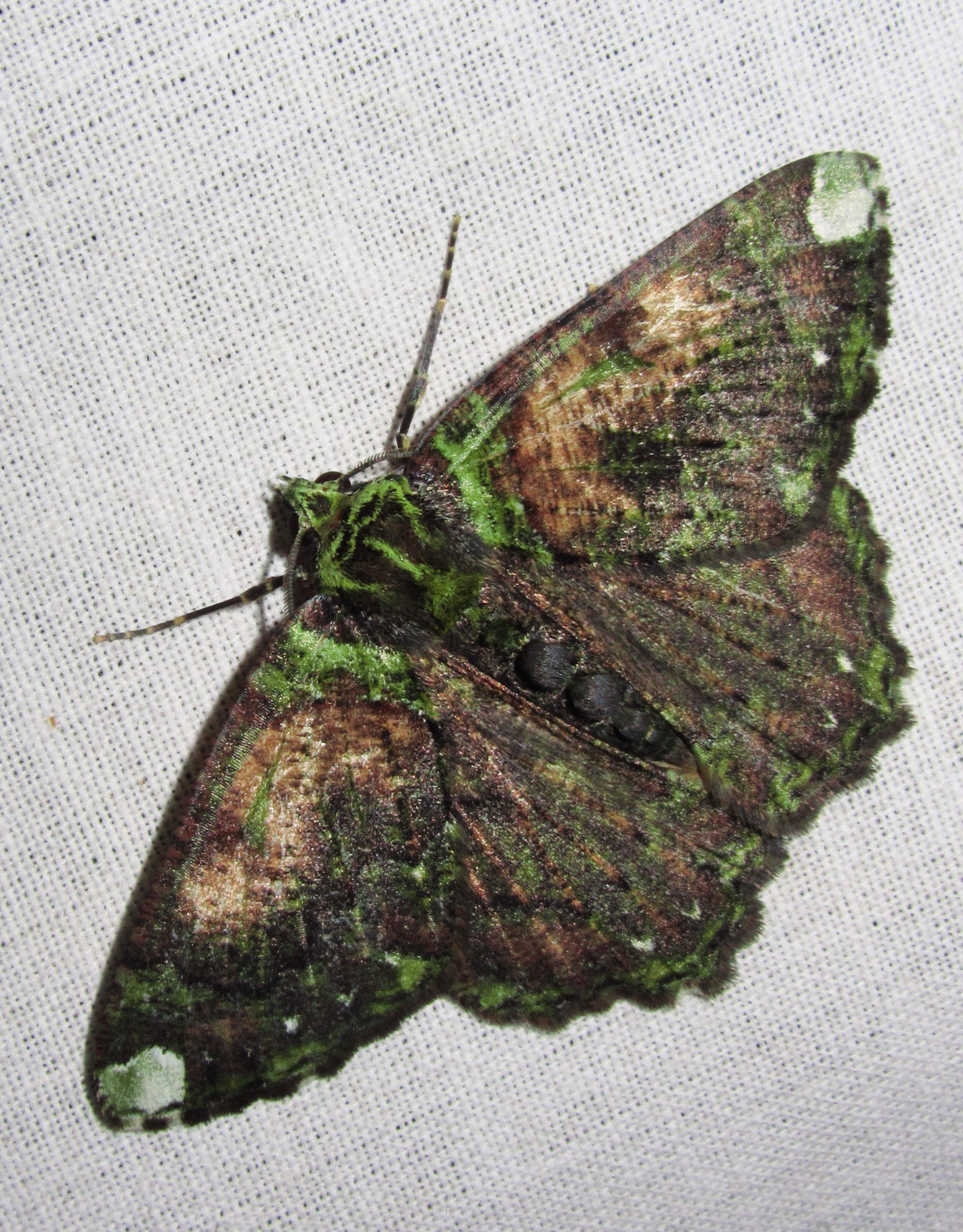

Scientific classification
- Kingdom: Animalia
- Phylum: Arthropoda
- Class: Insecta
- Order: Lepidoptera
- Family: Geometridae
- Subfamily: Geometrinae
- Tribe: Pseudoterpnini
- Genus: Dindicodes; Prout, 1912

= Dindicodes =

Genus of moths

Dindicodes is a genus of moths in the family Geometridae.

== Species ==
- crocina group
  - Dindicodes albodavidaria (Xue, 1992)
  - Dindicodes crocina (Butler, 1880)
  - Dindicodes davidaria (Poujade, 1895)
  - Dindicodes euclidiaria (Oberthür, 1913)
  - Dindicodes leopardinata (Moore, 1868)
  - Dindicodes moelleri (Warren, 1893)
- apicalis group
  - Dindicodes apicalis (Moore, 1888)
  - Dindicodes harutai (Yazaki, 1992)
- costiflavens group
  - Dindicodes costiflavens (Wehrli, 1933)
  - Dindicodes ectoxantha (Wehrli, 1933)
- Excluded from Dindicodes
  - "Dindicodes" vigil (Prout, 1926)
