= Sundadoxa =

Scientific classification
- Kingdom: Animalia
- Phylum: Arthropoda
- Clade: Pancrustacea
- Class: Insecta
- Order: Lepidoptera
- Family: Geometridae
- Tribe: Pseudoterpnini
- Genus: Sundadoxa; Holloway, 1996
- Species: S. multidentata

Binomial name
- Sundadoxa multidentata (L. B. Prout, 1916)

Synonyms
- Hypodoxa multidentata Prout, 1916

Genus of moths

Sundadoxa is a monotypic moth genus in the family Geometridae erected by Jeremy Daniel Holloway in 1996. Its only species, Sundadoxa multidentata, was first described by Louis Beethoven Prout in 1916. It is found in Brunei, Sumatra in Indonesia, Sarawak and Peninsular Malaysia.
