= Dindicodes moelleri =

Scientific classification
- Kingdom: Animalia
- Phylum: Arthropoda
- Class: Insecta
- Order: Lepidoptera
- Family: Geometridae
- Genus: Dindicodes
- Species: D. moelleri

Binomial name
- Dindicodes moelleri (Warren, 1893)

Synonyms
- Pachyodes moelleri Warren, 1893; Terpna moelleri

Species of moth

Dindicodes moelleri is a moth of the family Geometridae first described by William Warren in 1893. It is found in Sikkim, India.
