= Epipristis transiens =

Scientific classification
- Kingdom: Animalia
- Phylum: Arthropoda
- Class: Insecta
- Order: Lepidoptera
- Family: Geometridae
- Genus: Epipristis
- Species: E. transiens

Binomial name
- Epipristis transiens (Sterneck, 1927)

Synonyms
- Pingarmia transiens Sterneck, 1927

Species of moth

Epipristis transiens is a moth of the family Geometridae first described by Sterneck in 1927. It is found in the Chinese provinces of Beijing, Shanxi, Henan, Shaanxi and Ningxia.

The length of the forewings is 15–16 mm for males and 16–18 mm for females.
