= Hypodoxa bryophylla =

Scientific classification
- Kingdom: Animalia
- Phylum: Arthropoda
- Class: Insecta
- Order: Lepidoptera
- Family: Geometridae
- Genus: Hypodoxa
- Species: H. bryophylla

Binomial name
- Hypodoxa bryophylla (Goldfinch, 1929)

Synonyms
- Pingasa bryophylla Goldfinch, 1929

Species of moth

Hypodoxa bryophylla, the green looper moth, is a moth of the family Geometridae. The species was first described by Gilbert M. Goldfinch in 1929. It is found in the Australian states of Victoria, New South Wales and Queensland.

== See also ==
- List of moths of Australia
- https://www.csiro.au/en/Research/Collections/ANIC/ID-Resources/Australian-Moths-Online
