= Epipristis rufilunata =

Scientific classification
- Kingdom: Animalia
- Phylum: Arthropoda
- Class: Insecta
- Order: Lepidoptera
- Family: Geometridae
- Genus: Epipristis
- Species: E. rufilunata

Binomial name
- Epipristis rufilunata (Warren, 1903)

Synonyms
- Pingasa rufilunata Warren, 1903; Epipristis nelearia viridans Prout, 1916

Species of moth

Epipristis rufilunata is a moth of the family Geometridae first described by William Warren in 1903. It is found on New Guinea and the Bismarck Islands.

== Subspecies ==
- Epipristis rufilunata rufilunata
- Epipristis rufilunata antelucana Prout, 1927
