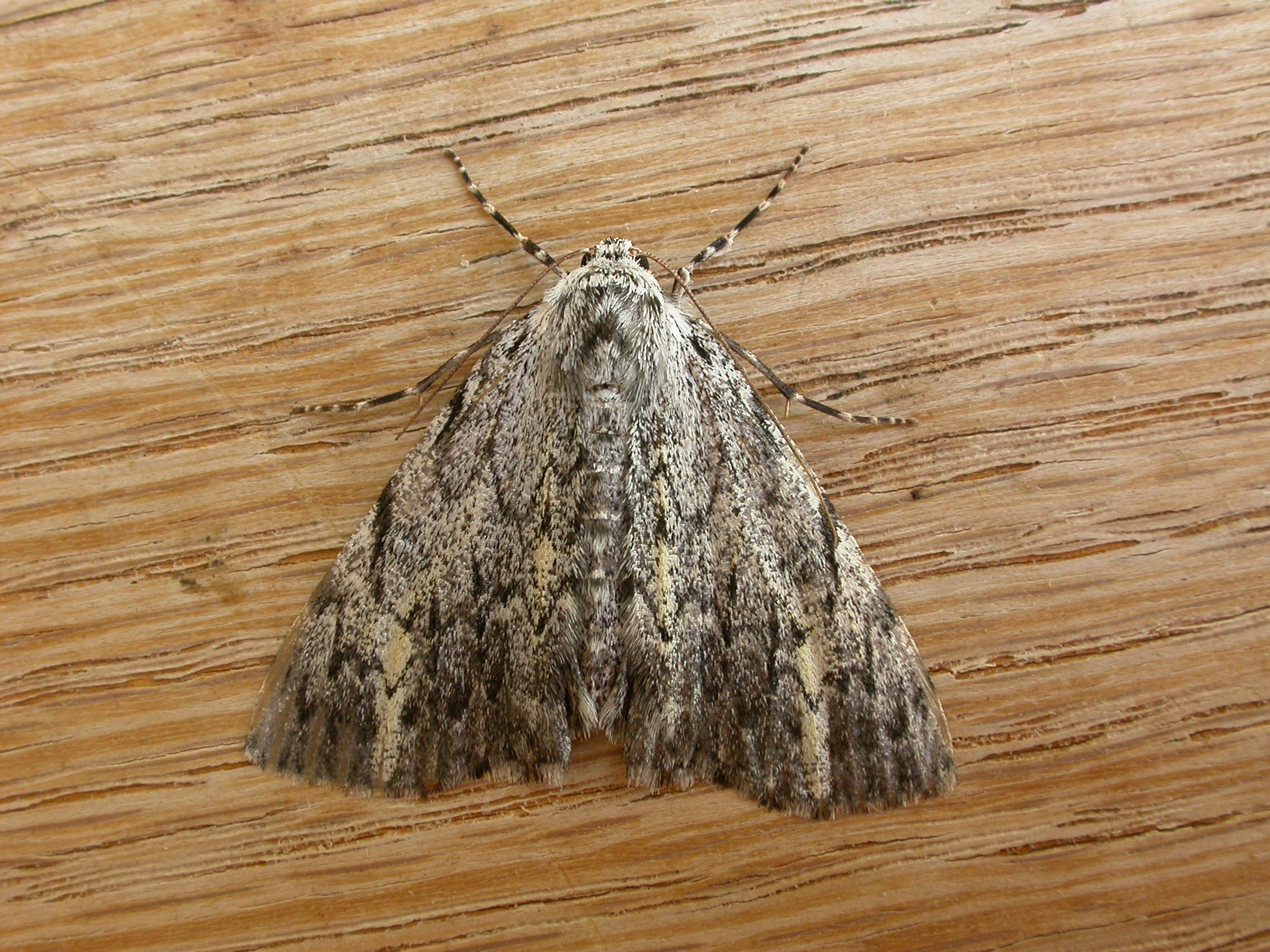

Scientific classification
- Kingdom: Animalia
- Phylum: Arthropoda
- Class: Insecta
- Order: Lepidoptera
- Family: Geometridae
- Genus: Rhuma
- Species: R. divergens

Binomial name
- Rhuma divergens (Goldfinch, 1929)

Synonyms
- Sterictopsis divergens Goldfinch, 1929

= Rhuma divergens =

Species of moth

Rhuma divergens is a moth of the family Geometridae first described by Gilbert M. Goldfinch in 1929. It is found in New South Wales, Australia.
