= Epipristis pullusa =

Scientific classification
- Kingdom: Animalia
- Phylum: Arthropoda
- Clade: Pancrustacea
- Class: Insecta
- Order: Lepidoptera
- Family: Geometridae
- Genus: Epipristis
- Species: E. pullusa

Binomial name
- Epipristis pullusa H.X. Han & D.Y. Xue, 2009

Species of moth

Epipristis pullusa is a moth of the family Geometridae. It is found in China (Henan).

The length of the forewings is 17.5–18 mm for males and 19.5–20 mm for females.
