= Metallolophia cineracea =

Scientific classification
- Kingdom: Animalia
- Phylum: Arthropoda
- Clade: Pancrustacea
- Class: Insecta
- Order: Lepidoptera
- Family: Geometridae
- Genus: Metallolophia
- Species: M. cineracea

Binomial name
- Metallolophia cineracea Holloway, 1996

Species of moth

Metallolophia cineracea is a moth of the family Geometridae first described by Jeremy Daniel Holloway in 1996. It is found on Borneo and Peninsular Malaysia. The habitat consists of lowland heath forests.

The wingspan is 15–20 mm.
