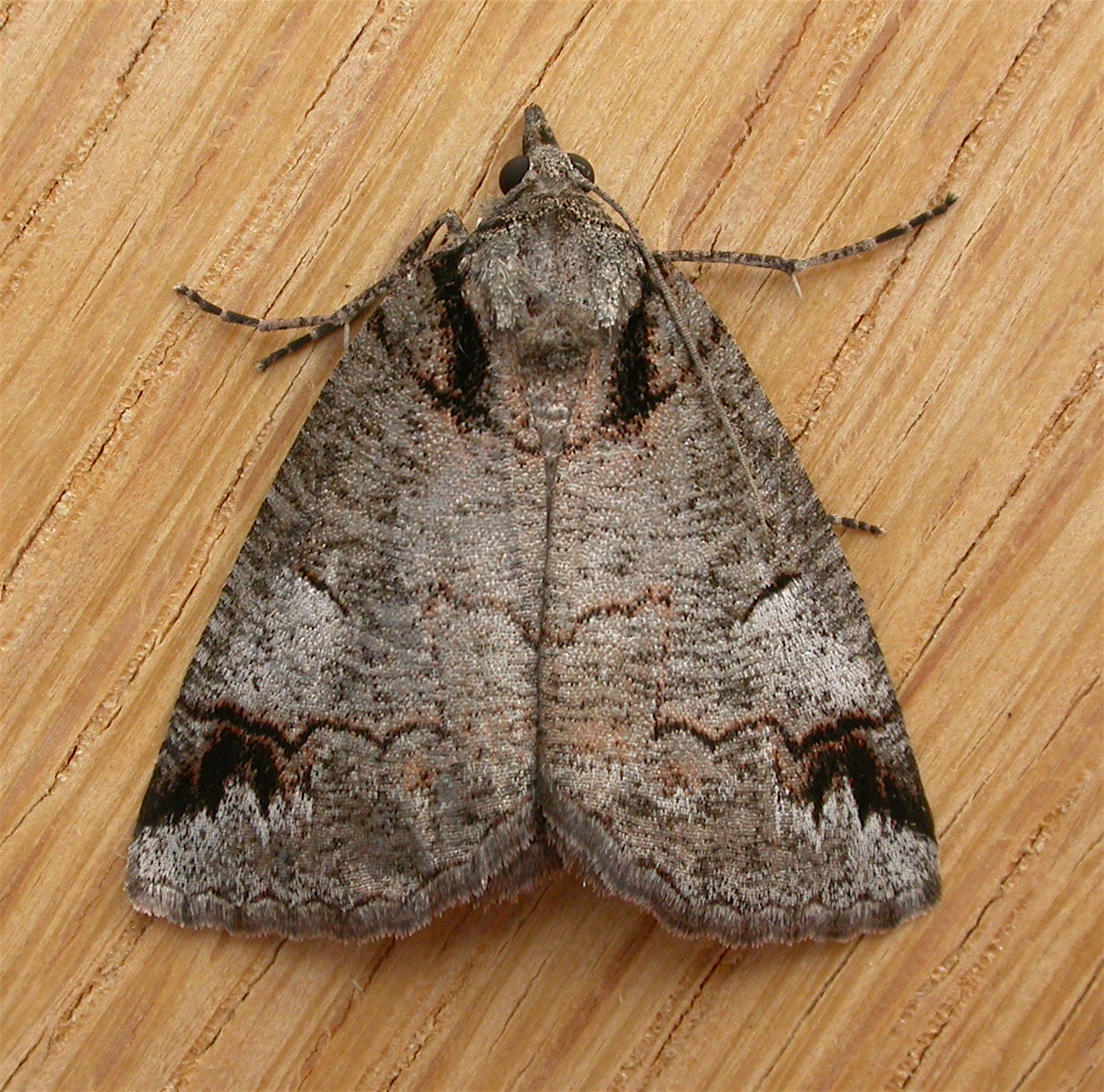
- Austroterpna paratorna

Scientific classification
- Kingdom: Animalia
- Phylum: Arthropoda
- Class: Insecta
- Order: Lepidoptera
- Family: Geometridae
- Tribe: Pseudoterpnini
- Genus: Austroterpna; Goldfinch, 1929

= Austroterpna =

Genus of moths

Austroterpna is a genus of moths in the family Geometridae.

== Species ==
- Austroterpna idiographa Goldfinch, 1929
- Austroterpna paratorna (Meyrick, 1888)
