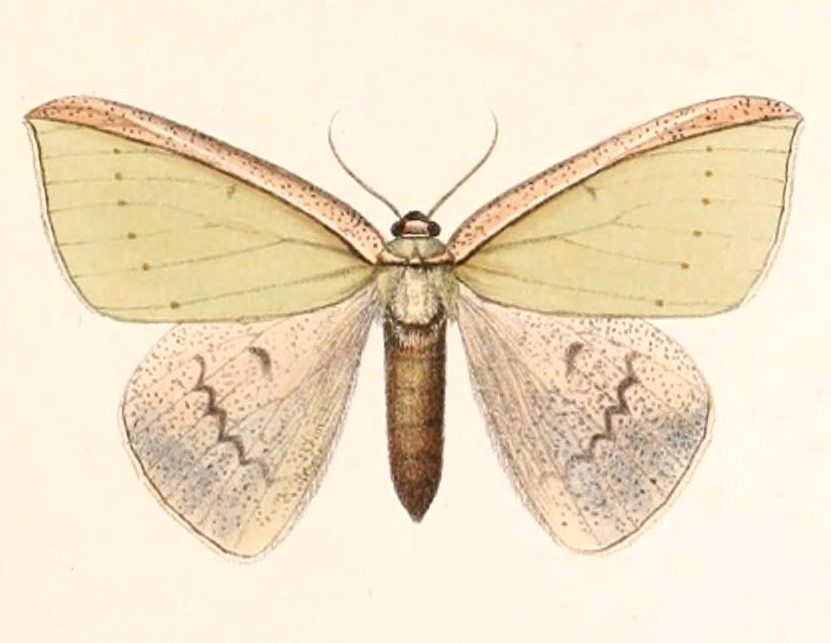
- Limbatochlamys rosthorni

Scientific classification
- Kingdom: Animalia
- Phylum: Arthropoda
- Class: Insecta
- Order: Lepidoptera
- Family: Geometridae
- Tribe: Pseudoterpnini
- Genus: Limbatochlamys; Rothschild, 1894

= Limbatochlamys =

Genus of moths

Limbatochlamys is a genus of moths in the family Geometridae described by Rothschild in 1894.

== Species ==
- Limbatochlamys rosthorni Rothschild, 1894
- Limbatochlamys pararosthorni Han & Xue, 2005
- Limbatochlamys parvisis Han & Xue, 2005
