= Dindicodes vigil =

Scientific classification
- Kingdom: Animalia
- Phylum: Arthropoda
- Class: Insecta
- Order: Lepidoptera
- Family: Geometridae
- Genus: Dindicodes
- Species: D. vigil

Binomial name
- Dindicodes vigil (L. B. Prout, 1926)

Synonyms
- Terpna vigil Prout, 1926

Species of moth

"Dindicodes" vigil is a moth of the family Geometridae first described by Louis Beethoven Prout in 1926. It is found in Myanmar.
