= Actenochroma =

Actenochroma muscicoloraria

Scientific classification
- Kingdom: Animalia
- Phylum: Arthropoda
- Clade: Pancrustacea
- Class: Insecta
- Order: Lepidoptera
- Family: Geometridae
- Tribe: Pseudoterpnini
- Genus: Actenochroma; Warren, 1893
- Species: A. muscicoloraria

Binomial name
- Actenochroma muscicoloraria (Walker, [1863])

Synonyms
- Hypochroma muscicoloraria Walker, [1863] 1862; Hypochroma sphagnata Felder & Rogenhofer, 1875

Monotypic genus of geometer moths

Actenochroma is a genus of moths in the family Geometridae. It consists of only one species, Actenochroma muscicoloraria, which is found in Brunei, China, India, Indonesia (Kalimantan, Sumatra), western Malaysia and Nepal.

Adults are fairly uniformly palish green, with wavy antemedial and dentate postmedial lines which are darker green, each forming a dark green spot on the costa of the forewing.
