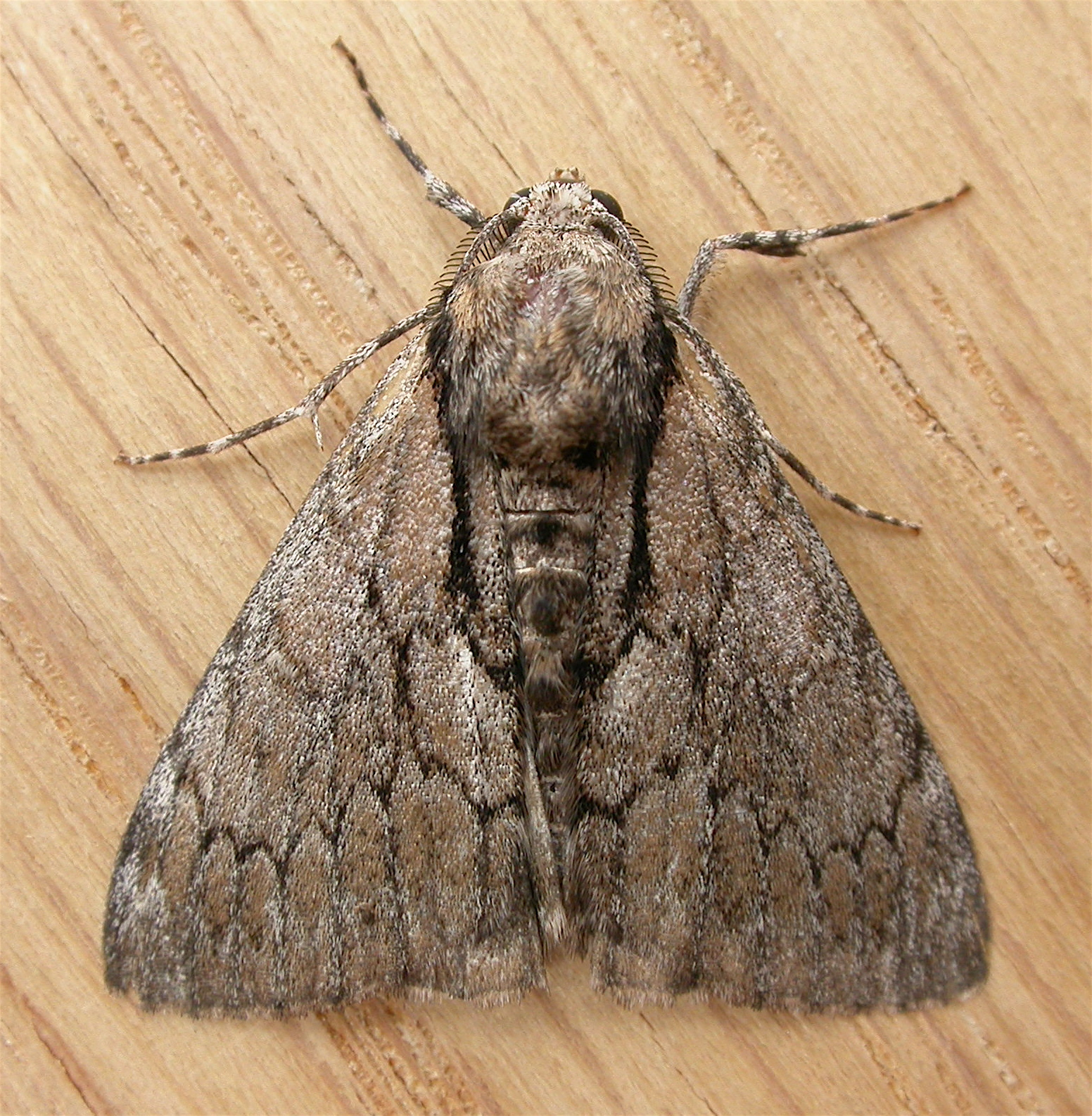

Scientific classification
- Kingdom: Animalia
- Phylum: Arthropoda
- Class: Insecta
- Order: Lepidoptera
- Family: Geometridae
- Tribe: Pseudoterpnini
- Genus: Rhuma; Walker, 1860

Synonyms
- Sterictopsis Warren, 1898; Oxyphanes Turner, 1936

= Rhuma =

Genus of moths

Rhuma is a genus of moths in the family Geometridae.

== Species ==
- Rhuma argyraspis (Lower, 1893)
- Rhuma divergens (Goldfinch, 1929)
- Rhuma subaurata Walker, 1860
- Rhuma thiobapta (Turner, 1936)
