= Epipristis truncataria =

Scientific classification
- Kingdom: Animalia
- Phylum: Arthropoda
- Class: Insecta
- Order: Lepidoptera
- Family: Geometridae
- Genus: Epipristis
- Species: E. truncataria

Binomial name
- Epipristis truncataria (Walker, 1861)

Synonyms
- Acidalia truncataria Walker, 1861

Species of moth

Epipristis truncataria is a moth of the family Geometridae first described by Francis Walker in 1861. It is found on Borneo and Sumatra and in Singapore.
