= Metaterpna =

Scientific classification
- Kingdom: Animalia
- Phylum: Arthropoda
- Class: Insecta
- Order: Lepidoptera
- Family: Geometridae
- Tribe: Pseudoterpnini
- Genus: Metaterpna; Yazaki, 1992

Genus of moths

Metaterpna is a genus of moths in the family Geometridae described by Yazaki in 1992.

== Species ==
- Metaterpna differens (Warren, 1909)
- Metaterpna thyatiraria (Oberthür, 1913) (=Dindica thyatiroides Sterneck, 1928)
