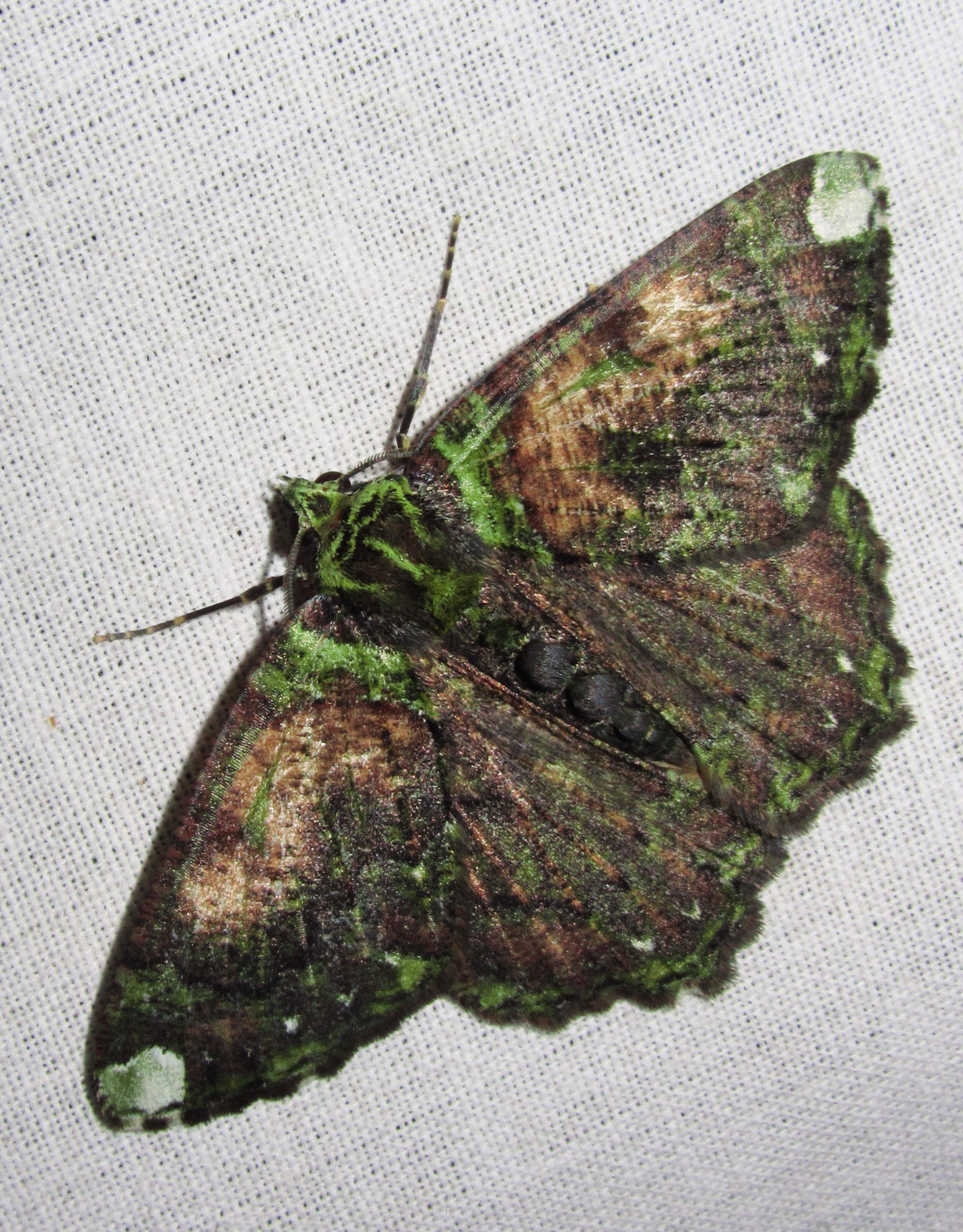

Scientific classification
- Kingdom: Animalia
- Phylum: Arthropoda
- Class: Insecta
- Order: Lepidoptera
- Family: Geometridae
- Genus: Dindicodes
- Species: D. apicalis

Binomial name
- Dindicodes apicalis (Moore, 1888)

Synonyms
- Pingasa apicalis Moore, 1888; Pachyodes apicalis; Pachyodes hunana Xue, 1992

= Dindicodes apicalis =

Species of moth

Dindicodes apicalis is a moth of the family Geometridae first described by Frederic Moore in 1888. It is found in Asia, including India and China.

== Subspecies ==
- Dindicodes apicalis apicalis
- Dindicodes apicalis hunana (Xue, 1992)
