= Psilotagma decorata =

Scientific classification
- Kingdom: Animalia
- Phylum: Arthropoda
- Class: Insecta
- Order: Lepidoptera
- Family: Geometridae
- Genus: Psilotagma
- Species: P. decorata

Binomial name
- Psilotagma decorata Warren, 1894

Synonyms
- Pachyodes decorata; Terpna decorata; Terpna dorsocristata Poujade, 1895; Pseudoterpna dorsocristata

Species of moth

Psilotagma decorata is a moth of the family Geometridae first described by William Warren in 1894. It is found in China (Hubei, Gansu, Hunan, Guangxi, Henan, Yunnan, Sichuan, Shaanxi) and Bhutan.
