= Hypodoxa calliglauca =

Scientific classification
- Kingdom: Animalia
- Phylum: Arthropoda
- Class: Insecta
- Order: Lepidoptera
- Family: Geometridae
- Genus: Hypodoxa
- Species: H. calliglauca

Binomial name
- Hypodoxa calliglauca (Turner, 1926)

Synonyms
- Pingasa calliglauca Turner, 1926

Species of moth

Hypodoxa calliglauca is a moth of the family Geometridae first described by Alfred Jefferis Turner in 1926. It is found in the Australian states of New South Wales and Queensland.

The larvae feed on Leptospermum species.
