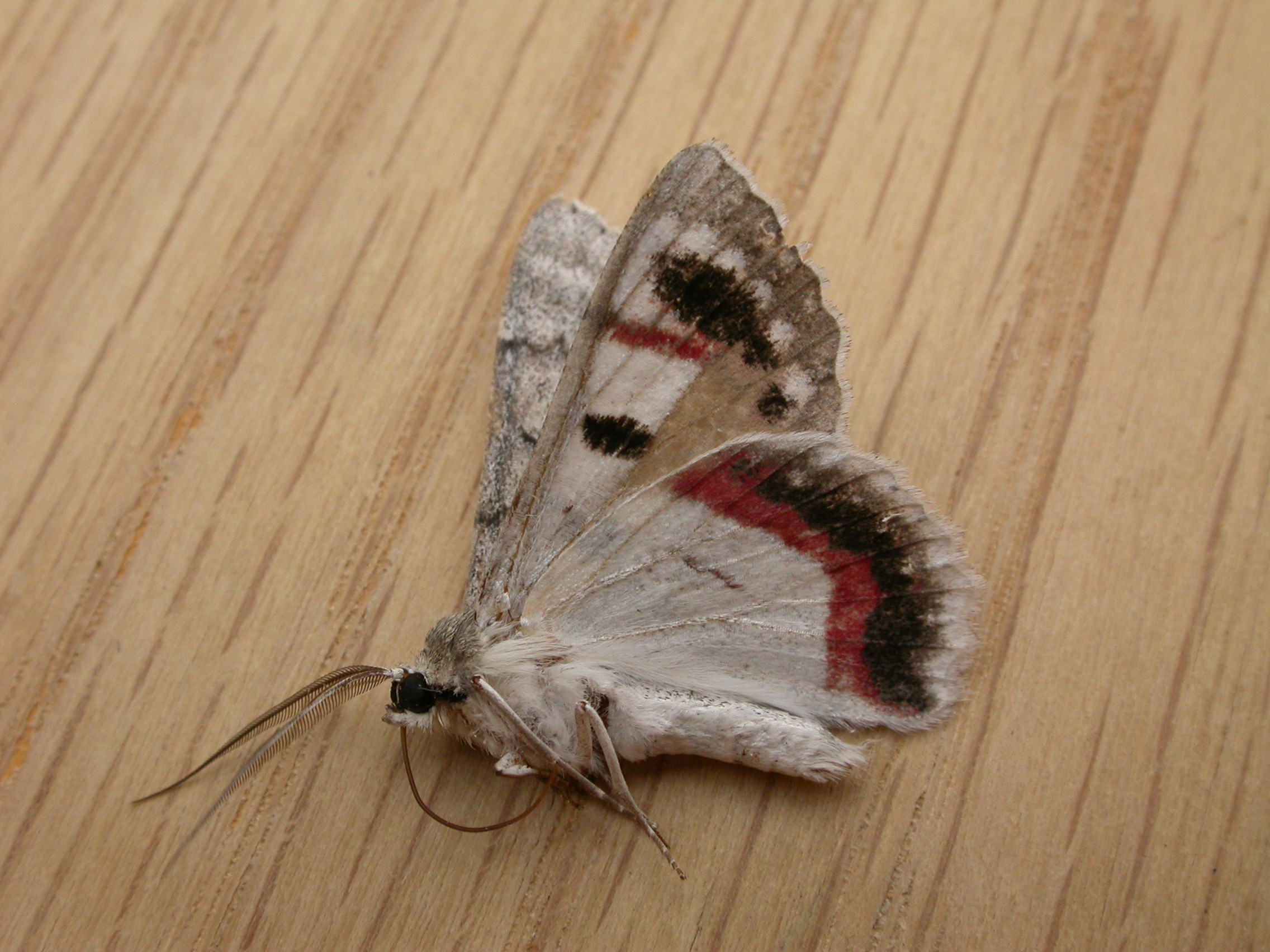
- Underside of the wings, showing the red lines

Scientific classification
- Kingdom: Animalia
- Phylum: Arthropoda
- Class: Insecta
- Order: Lepidoptera
- Family: Geometridae
- Genus: Crypsiphona
- Species: C. ocultaria

Binomial name
- Crypsiphona ocultaria (Donovan, 1805)

Synonyms
- Phalaena occultaria Donovan, 1805; Crypsiphona ocultaria

= Crypsiphona ocultaria =

Species of moth

Crypsiphona ocultaria (erroneously as: Phalaena occultaria Guenée, 1857) the red-lined looper moth or red-lined geometer, is a moth of the family Geometridae. The species was first described by Edward Donovan in 1805 and it is found in Australia.

It is one of the most common moths found in Australia. The "red-lined" part of the name refers to the red markings seen on the undersides of the wings. The moth has a wingspan of 4-5 cm. Both sexes of the moth are similar in appearance. When threatened the grub stands still, pretending to be a stick.

As larvae it is a bluish-green with an off-white line on its sides. The larvae feed on eucalypt leaves.
