= Metaterpna differens =

Scientific classification
- Kingdom: Animalia
- Phylum: Arthropoda
- Class: Insecta
- Order: Lepidoptera
- Family: Geometridae
- Genus: Metaterpna
- Species: M. differens

Binomial name
- Metaterpna differens (Warren, 1909)

Synonyms
- Terpna differens Warren, 1909

Species of moth

Metaterpna differens is a moth of the family Geometridae first described by William Warren in 1909. It is found in Xizang, China.
