= Holoterpna diagrapharia =

Scientific classification
- Kingdom: Animalia
- Phylum: Arthropoda
- Clade: Pancrustacea
- Class: Insecta
- Order: Lepidoptera
- Family: Geometridae
- Genus: Holoterpna
- Species: H. diagrapharia

Binomial name
- Holoterpna diagrapharia Püngeler, 1900

Species of moth

Holoterpna diagrapharia is a moth of the family Geometridae first described by Rudolf Püngeler in 1900. It is found in Transcaspia, Turkmenistan and northern Iran.
