= Metallolophia assamensis =

Scientific classification
- Kingdom: Animalia
- Phylum: Arthropoda
- Class: Insecta
- Order: Lepidoptera
- Family: Geometridae
- Genus: Metallolophia
- Species: M. assamensis

Binomial name
- Metallolophia assamensis Orhant, 2000

Species of moth

Metallolophia assamensis is a moth of the family Geometridae first described by Georges E. R. J. Orhant in 2000. It is found in Assam, India.
