= Hypodoxa corrosa =

Scientific classification
- Kingdom: Animalia
- Phylum: Arthropoda
- Class: Insecta
- Order: Lepidoptera
- Family: Geometridae
- Genus: Hypodoxa
- Species: H. corrosa

Binomial name
- Hypodoxa corrosa (Warren, 1907)

Synonyms
- Hypochroma corrosa Warren, 1907

Species of moth

Hypodoxa corrosa is a moth of the family Geometridae first described by William Warren in 1907. It is found on New Guinea.
