= Dindicodes harutai =

Scientific classification
- Kingdom: Animalia
- Phylum: Arthropoda
- Class: Insecta
- Order: Lepidoptera
- Family: Geometridae
- Genus: Dindicodes
- Species: D. harutai

Binomial name
- Dindicodes harutai (Yazaki, 1992)

Synonyms
- Pachyodes harutai Yazaki, 1992; Pachyodes infuscatus Yazaki, 1992

Species of moth

Dindicodes harutai is a moth of the family Geometridae first described by Yazaki in 1992.

== Subspecies ==
- Dindicodes harutai harutai (Yazaki, 1992)
- Dindicodes harutai infuscatus (Yazaki, 1992)
