= Metallolophia stueningi =

Scientific classification
- Kingdom: Animalia
- Phylum: Arthropoda
- Class: Insecta
- Order: Lepidoptera
- Family: Geometridae
- Genus: Metallolophia
- Species: M. stueningi

Binomial name
- Metallolophia stueningi Han & Xue, 2005

Species of moth

Metallolophia stueningi is a moth of the family Geometridae. It was described by Han Hongxiang and Xue Dayong in 2005. It is known from Mount Fansipan, Vietnam. The type series was collected at elevations of 1,500–1,800 m (4,900–5,900 ft) above sea level.

The forewing length is 26–28 mm (1.0–1.1 in) in males.
