= Dindicodes ectoxantha =

Scientific classification
- Kingdom: Animalia
- Phylum: Arthropoda
- Class: Insecta
- Order: Lepidoptera
- Family: Geometridae
- Genus: Dindicodes
- Species: D. ectoxantha

Binomial name
- Dindicodes ectoxantha (Wehrli, 1933)

Synonyms
- Terpna ectoxantha Wehrli, 1933; Pachyodes ectoxantha

Species of moth

Dindicodes ectoxantha is a moth of the family Geometridae first described by Eugen Wehrli in 1933. It is found in Yunnan, China.
