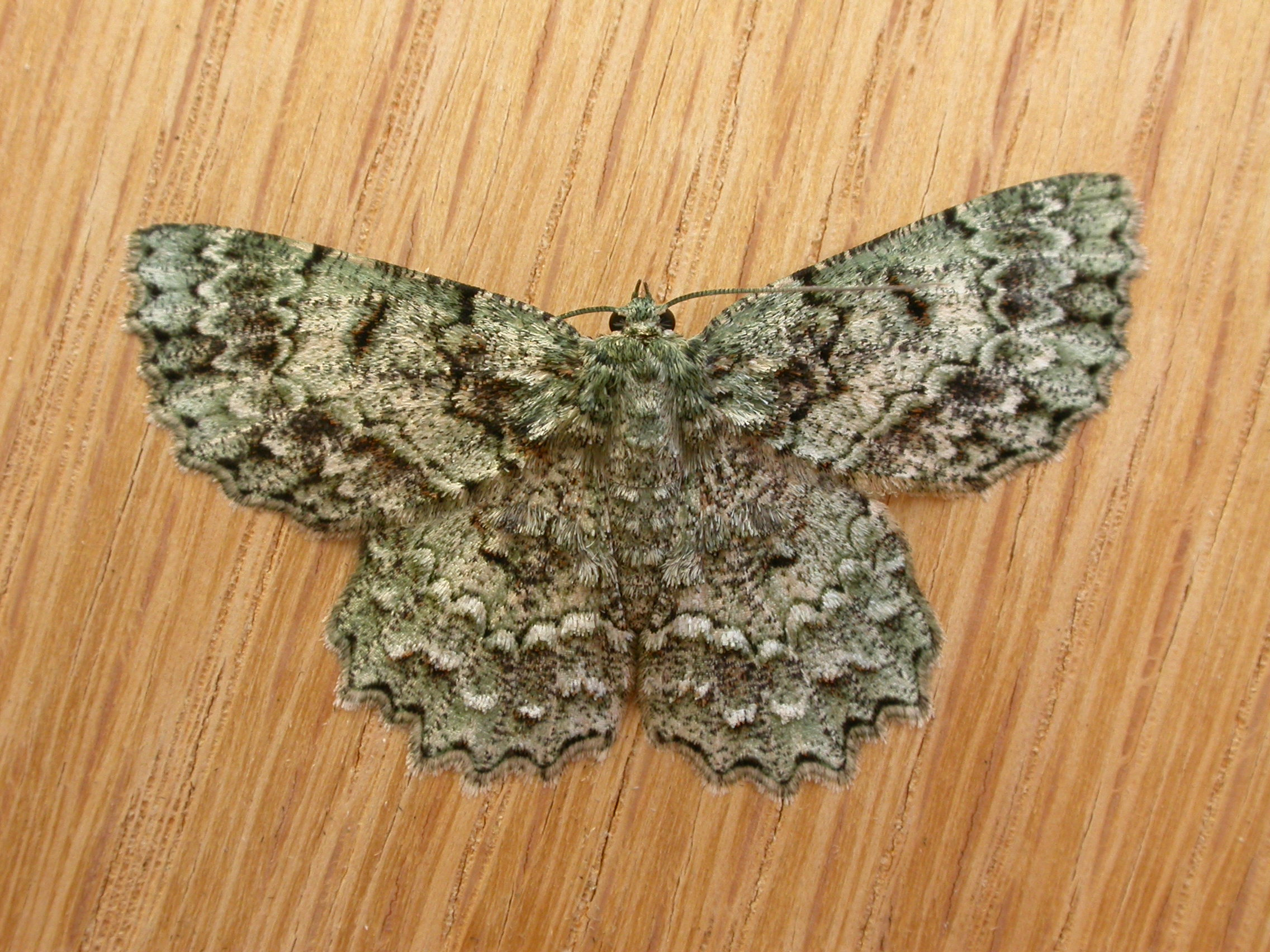

Scientific classification
- Kingdom: Animalia
- Phylum: Arthropoda
- Class: Insecta
- Order: Lepidoptera
- Family: Geometridae
- Genus: Hypodoxa
- Species: H. muscosaria

Binomial name
- Hypodoxa muscosaria (Guenée, 1857)

Synonyms
- Hypochroma muscosaria Guenée, 1857; Hypochroma cetraria Felder & Rogenhofer, 1875; Hypochroma squamata Felder & Rogenhofer, 1875

= Hypodoxa muscosaria =

Species of moth

Hypodoxa muscosaria, the textured emerald, is a moth of the family Geometridae first described by Achille Guenée in 1857. It is found along the east coast of Australia.

The wingspan is about 40 mm.
