= Absala =

Scientific classification
- Kingdom: Animalia
- Phylum: Arthropoda
- Class: Insecta
- Order: Lepidoptera
- Family: Geometridae
- Subfamily: Geometrinae
- Tribe: Pseudoterpnini
- Genus: Absala; C. Swinhoe, 1893
- Species: A. dorcada

Binomial name
- Absala dorcada C. Swinhoe, 1893

Monotypic genus of geometer moths

Absala is a monotypic moth genus in the family Geometridae. It consists of only one species, Absala dorcada, which is found in China, India, Thailand and Vietnam. Both the genus and species were first described by Charles Swinhoe in 1893.
