= Mictoschema =

Scientific classification
- Kingdom: Animalia
- Phylum: Arthropoda
- Clade: Pancrustacea
- Class: Insecta
- Order: Lepidoptera
- Family: Geometridae
- Tribe: Pseudoterpnini
- Genus: Mictoschema; Prout, 1922

Genus of moths

Mictoschema is a genus of moths in the family Geometridae described by Prout in 1922.

== Species ==
- Mictoschema swierstrai Prout, 1922
- Mictoschema tuckeri Prout, 1925
