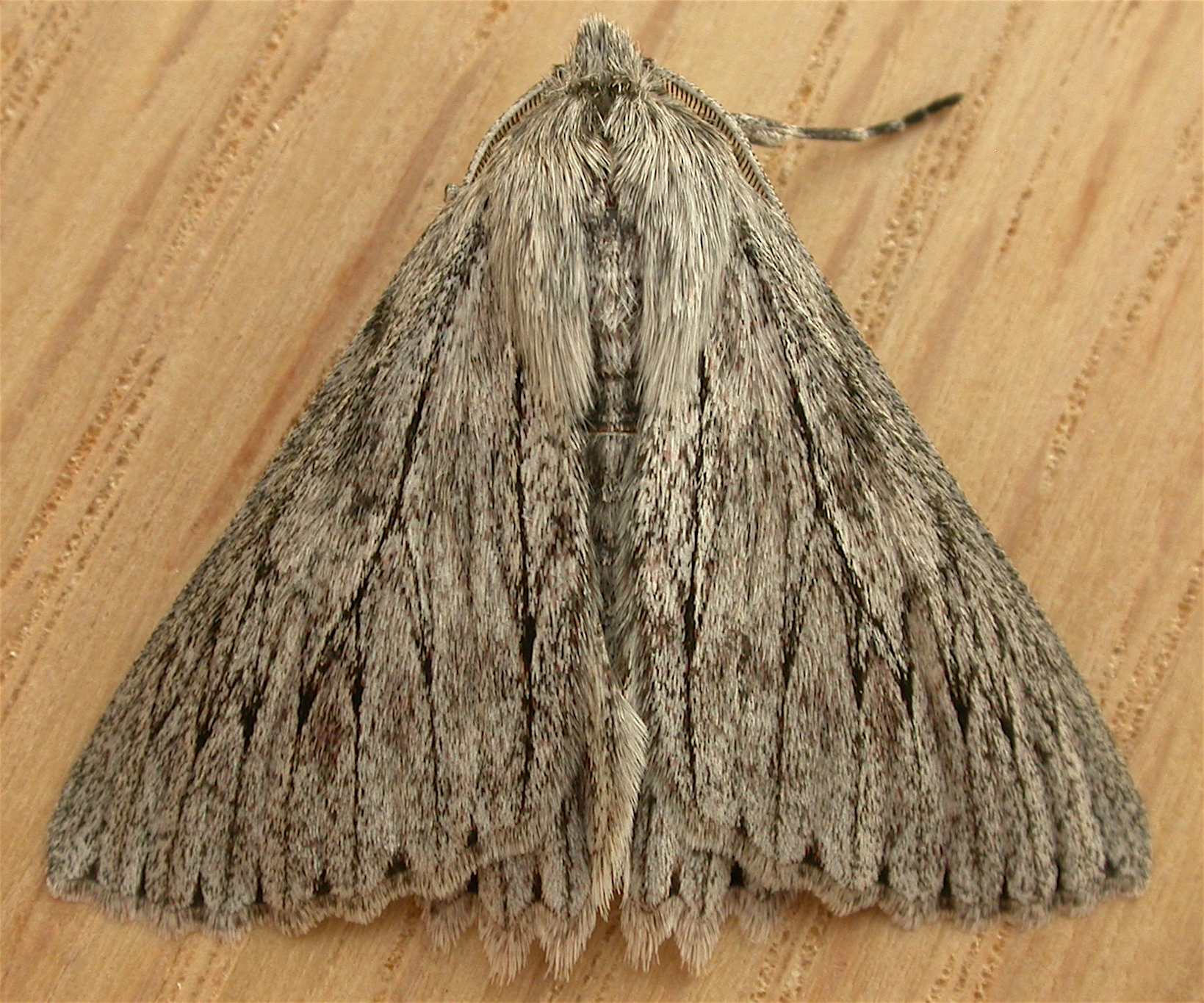

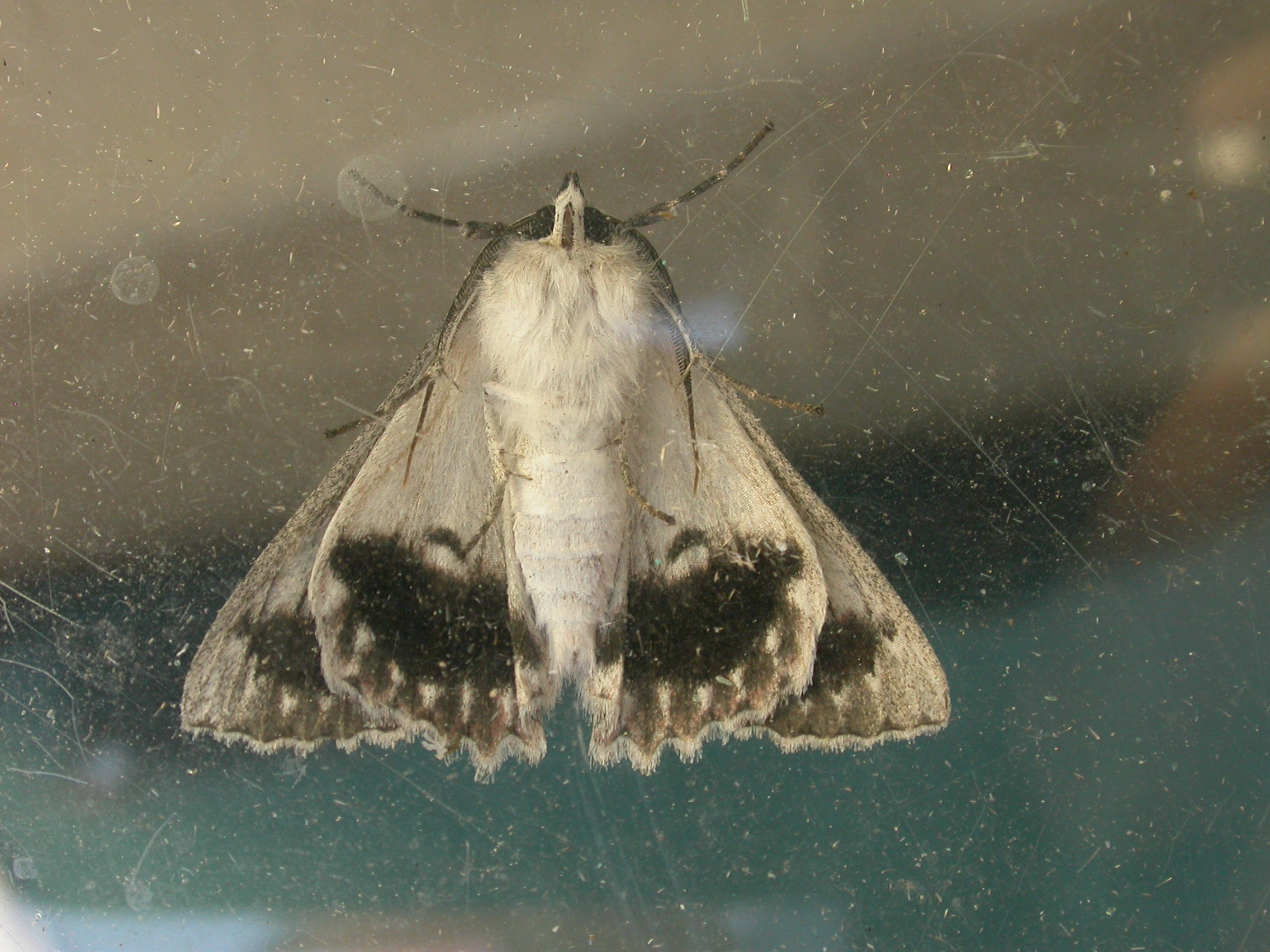

Scientific classification
- Kingdom: Animalia
- Phylum: Arthropoda
- Class: Insecta
- Order: Lepidoptera
- Family: Geometridae
- Genus: Cyneoterpna
- Species: C. wilsoni

Binomial name
- Cyneoterpna wilsoni (R. Felder & Rogenhofer, 1875)

Synonyms
- Hypochroma wilsoni R. Felder & Rogenhofer, 1875

= Cyneoterpna wilsoni =

Species of moth

Cyneoterpna wilsoni, or Wilson's grey, is a moth of the family Geometridae first described by Rudolf Felder and Alois Friedrich Rogenhofer in 1875. It is found in the Australian states of Queensland, New South Wales, Victoria, South Australia and Tasmania.

The wingspan is about 40 mm.

The larvae feed on Eucalyptus species.
