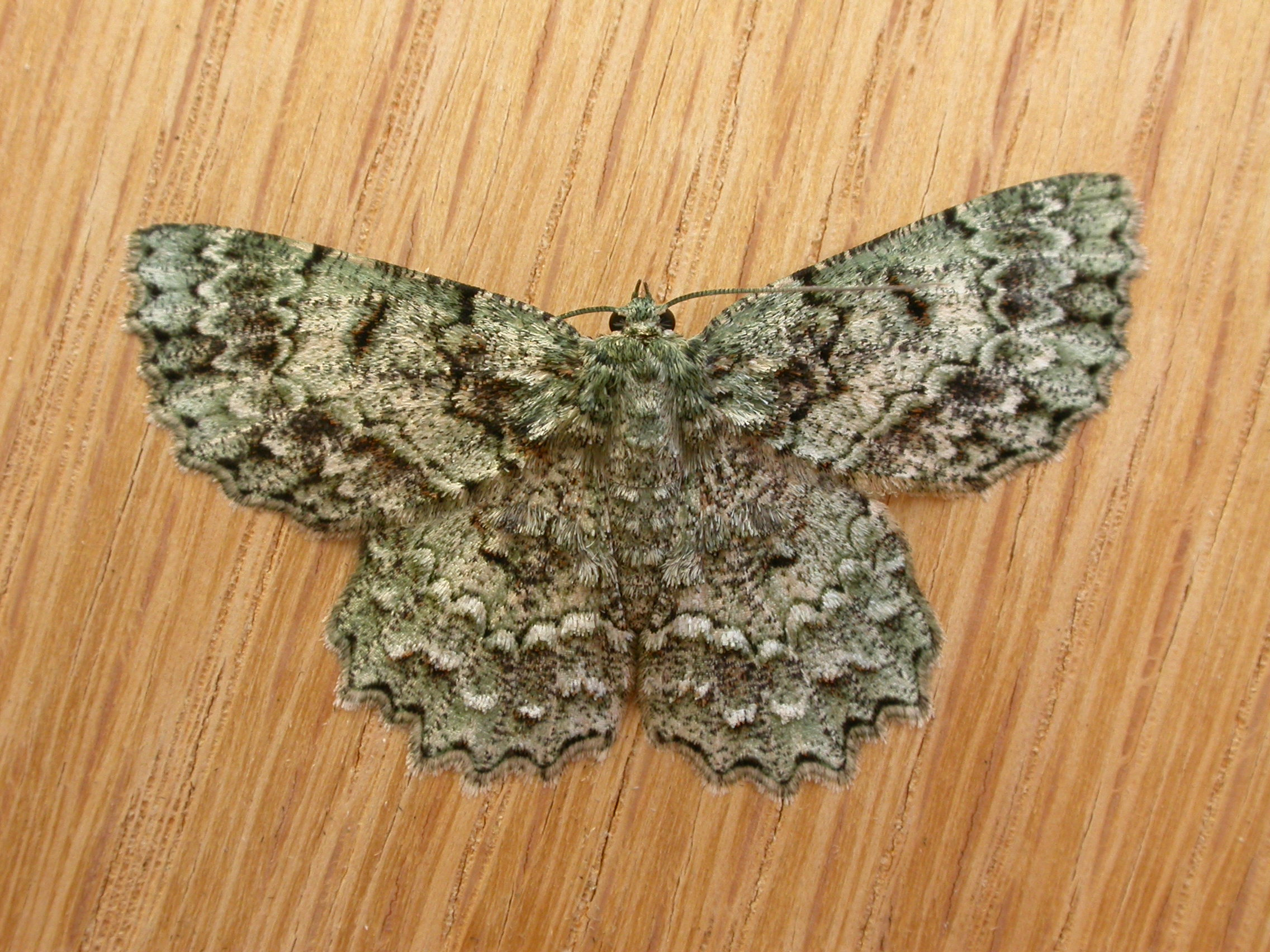

Scientific classification
- Kingdom: Animalia
- Phylum: Arthropoda
- Clade: Pancrustacea
- Class: Insecta
- Order: Lepidoptera
- Family: Geometridae
- Tribe: Pseudoterpnini
- Genus: Hypodoxa; Prout, 1912

= Hypodoxa =

Genus of moths

Hypodoxa is a genus of moths in the family Geometridae described by Prout in 1912.

== Species ==
- Hypodoxa bryophylla (Goldfinch, 1929)
- Hypodoxa calliglauca (Turner, 1926)
- Hypodoxa conspurcata (Lucas, 1898) (=Pseudoterpna myriosticta Turner, 1904)
- Hypodoxa corrosa (Warren, 1907)
- Hypodoxa deteriorata (Walker, 1860) (=Boarmia nigraria Felder & Rogenhofer, 1875)
- Hypodoxa emiliaria (Guenée, [1858])
  - Hypodoxa emiliaria emiliaria (Guenée, [1858]) (=Hypochroma assidens Lucas, 1901, Hypochroma aurantiacea Lucas, 1891, Hypochroma subornata Warren, 1896, Pingasa talagi Swinhoe, 1917)
  - Hypodoxa emiliaria aignanensis Prout, 1916
  - Hypodoxa emiliaria basinigra (Warren, 1902)
  - Hypodoxa emiliaria fulgurea Prout, 1913
  - Hypodoxa emiliaria purpurifera (Warren, 1899)
  - Hypodoxa emiliaria purpurissata (Lucas, 1901)
  - Hypodoxa emiliaria subleprosa Prout, 1917
- Hypodoxa erebusata (Walker, 1860) (=Hypochroma erebata Meyrick, 1888)
- Hypodoxa horridata (Walker, [1863])
- Hypodoxa involuta Prout, 1933 (=Hypodoxa involuta perplexa Prout, 1933)
- Hypodoxa leprosa (Warren, 1907)
  - Hypodoxa leprosa leprosa (Warren, 1907)
  - Hypodoxa leprosa incarnata Prout, 1913
- Hypodoxa lichenosa (Warren, 1907)
  - Hypodoxa lichenosa lichenosa (Warren, 1907)
  - Hypodoxa lichenosa rufomixta Prout, 1913
- Hypodoxa multicolor (Warren, 1899) (=Hypodoxa multicolor circumsepta Prout, 1913)
- Hypodoxa muscosaria (Guenée, [1858])
- Hypodoxa paroptila (Turner, 1906)
- Hypodoxa regina Prout, 1916
  - Hypodoxa regina regina Prout, 1916
  - Hypodoxa regina pallida Joicey & Talbot, 1917
- Hypodoxa ruptilinea Prout, 1913
- Hypodoxa viridicoma (Warren, 1899) (=Hypochroma viridicoma interrupta Warren, 1902)
