= Pullichroma =

Scientific classification
- Kingdom: Animalia
- Phylum: Arthropoda
- Clade: Pancrustacea
- Class: Insecta
- Order: Lepidoptera
- Family: Geometridae
- Tribe: Pseudoterpnini
- Genus: Pullichroma; Holloway, 1996
- Species: P. pullicosta

Binomial name
- Pullichroma pullicosta (L. B. Prout, 1931)

Synonyms
- Actenochroma pullicosta Prout, 1931

Genus of moths

Pullichroma is a monotypic moth genus in the family Geometridae erected by Jeremy Daniel Holloway in 1996. Its only species, Pullichroma pullicosta, was first described by Louis Beethoven Prout in 1931. It is found in Brunei, Indonesia (Sulawesi, Sumatra) and the Philippines.
