= Hypodoxa involuta =

Scientific classification
- Kingdom: Animalia
- Phylum: Arthropoda
- Class: Insecta
- Order: Lepidoptera
- Family: Geometridae
- Genus: Hypodoxa
- Species: H. involuta

Binomial name
- Hypodoxa involuta L. B. Prout, 1933

Synonyms
- Hypodoxa involuta perplexa Prout, 1933

Species of moth

Hypodoxa involuta is a moth of the family Geometridae. It was first described by Louis Beethoven Prout in 1933 and is found on Buru in Indonesia.
