= Hypodoxa lichenosa =

Scientific classification
- Kingdom: Animalia
- Phylum: Arthropoda
- Class: Insecta
- Order: Lepidoptera
- Family: Geometridae
- Genus: Hypodoxa
- Species: H. lichenosa

Binomial name
- Hypodoxa lichenosa (Warren, 1907)

Synonyms
- Hypochroma lichenosa Warren, 1907

Species of moth

Hypodoxa lichenosa is a moth of the family Geometridae first described by William Warren in 1907. It is found on New Guinea.

== Subspecies ==
- Hypodoxa lichenosa lichenosa
- Hypodoxa lichenosa rufomixta Prout, 1913
