= Orthorisma =

Orthorisma netunaria

Scientific classification
- Kingdom: Animalia
- Phylum: Arthropoda
- Clade: Pancrustacea
- Class: Insecta
- Order: Lepidoptera
- Family: Geometridae
- Tribe: Pseudoterpnini
- Genus: Orthorisma; Prout, 1912
- Species: O. netunaria

Binomial name
- Orthorisma netunaria (Guenée, [1858])

Synonyms
- Genus: Orthocraspeda Prout, 1912; Species: Hypochroma netunaria Guenée, [1858]; Terpna crassistriga Warren 1896; Actenochroma unicolor Warren 1899

Genus of moths

Orthorisma is a monotypic genus of moths in the family Geometridae described by Prout in 1912. It consists of only one species, Orthorisma netunaria, first described by Achille Guenée in 1858. It is found in Brunei, Malaysia (Sabah, Sarawak) and Indonesia (Kalimantan, Natuna Islands, Sumatra).
