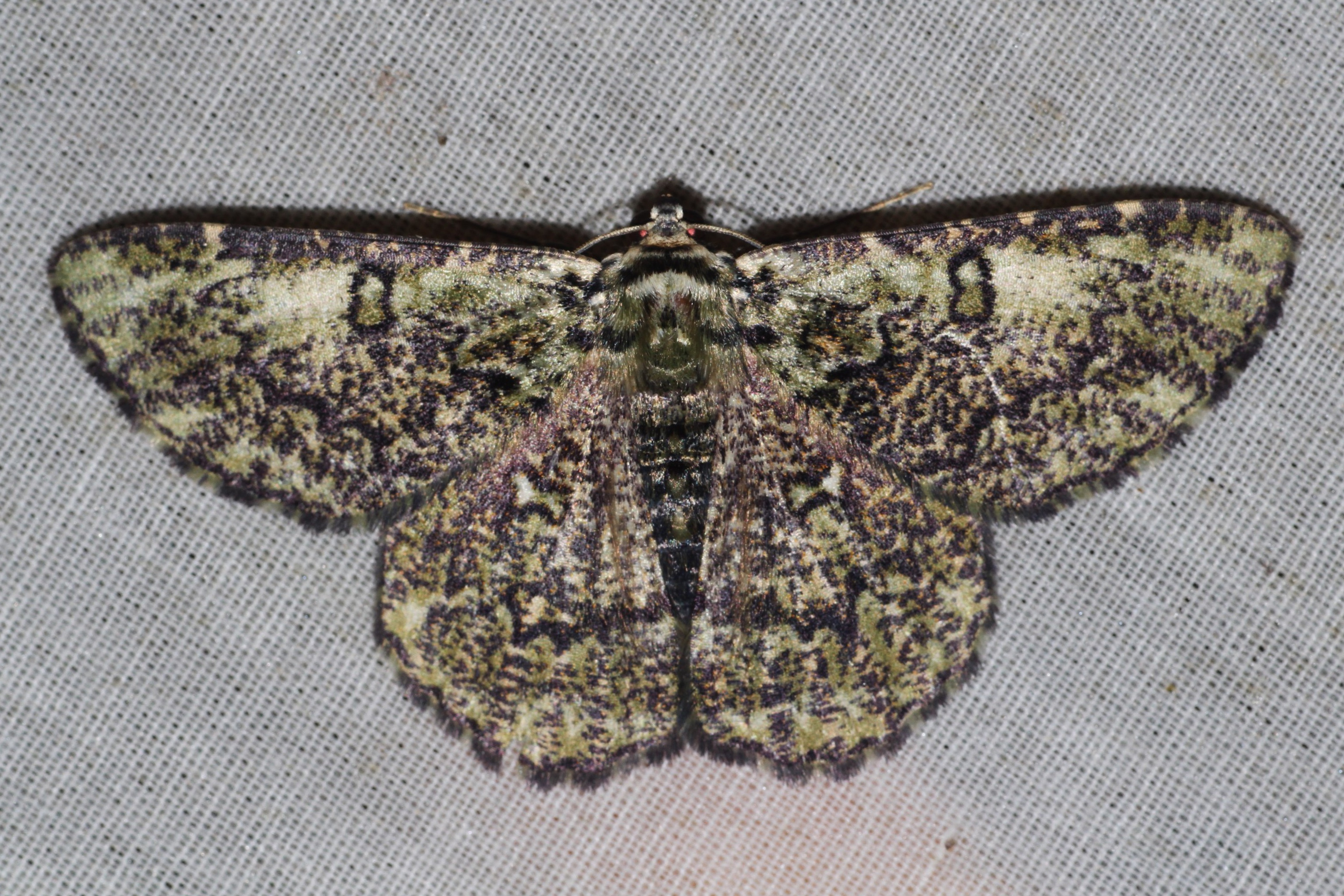

Scientific classification
- Kingdom: Animalia
- Phylum: Arthropoda
- Class: Insecta
- Order: Lepidoptera
- Family: Geometridae
- Genus: Metallolophia
- Species: M. subradiata

Binomial name
- Metallolophia subradiata (Warren, 1897)

Synonyms
- Terpna subradiata Warren, 1897

= Metallolophia subradiata =

Species of moth

Metallolophia subradiata is a moth of the family Geometridae first described by William Warren in 1897. It is found on Peninsular Malaysia, Sumatra and Borneo. The habitat consists of lower montane forests and hill dipterocarp forests.
