= Dindicodes leopardinata =

Scientific classification
- Kingdom: Animalia
- Phylum: Arthropoda
- Class: Insecta
- Order: Lepidoptera
- Family: Geometridae
- Genus: Dindicodes
- Species: D. leopardinata

Binomial name
- Dindicodes leopardinata (Moore, 1868)

Synonyms
- Hypochroma leopardinata Moore, 1868; Terpna leopardinata

Species of moth

Dindicodes leopardinata is a moth of the family Geometridae first described by Frederic Moore in 1868. It is found in northern India.
