= Holoterpna errata =

Scientific classification
- Kingdom: Animalia
- Phylum: Arthropoda
- Clade: Pancrustacea
- Class: Insecta
- Order: Lepidoptera
- Family: Geometridae
- Genus: Holoterpna
- Species: H. errata

Binomial name
- Holoterpna errata L. B. Prout, 1922

Species of moth

Holoterpna errata is a moth of the family Geometridae first described by Louis Beethoven Prout in 1922. It is found in Namibia, Zimbabwe and South Africa.

== Subspecies ==
- Holoterpna errata errata
- Holoterpna errata segnis Prout, 1930
