= Metaterpna thyatiraria =

Scientific classification
- Kingdom: Animalia
- Phylum: Arthropoda
- Class: Insecta
- Order: Lepidoptera
- Family: Geometridae
- Genus: Metaterpna
- Species: M. thyatiraria

Binomial name
- Metaterpna thyatiraria (Oberthür, 1913)

Synonyms
- Hypochroma thyatiraria Oberthür, 1913; Dindica thyatiroides Sterneck, 1928

Species of moth

Metaterpna thyatiraria is a moth of the family Geometridae first described by Charles Oberthür in 1913. It is found in the Chinese provinces of Gansu, Yunnan, Sichuan and Shaanxi.
