= Pachista =

Scientific classification
- Kingdom: Animalia
- Phylum: Arthropoda
- Clade: Pancrustacea
- Class: Insecta
- Order: Lepidoptera
- Family: Geometridae
- Tribe: Pseudoterpnini
- Genus: Pachista; Prout, 1912
- Species: P. superans

Binomial name
- Pachista superans (Butler, 1878)

Synonyms
- Hypochroma superans Butler, 1878; Pingasa shirakiana Matsumura, 1931

Genus of moths

Pachista is a genus of moths in the family Geometridae described by Prout in 1912. It consists of only one species, Pachista superans, first described by Arthur Gardiner Butler in 1878, which is found in China, Japan and Korea.

The larvae feed on Magnolia and Aesculus species.
