= Limbatochlamys parvisis =

Scientific classification
- Kingdom: Animalia
- Phylum: Arthropoda
- Clade: Pancrustacea
- Class: Insecta
- Order: Lepidoptera
- Family: Geometridae
- Genus: Limbatochlamys
- Species: L. parvisis

Binomial name
- Limbatochlamys parvisis Han & Xue, 2005

Species of moth

Limbatochlamys parvisis is a moth of the family Geometridae first described by Hong-Xiang Han and Da-Yong Xue in 2005. It is found in Yunnan, China.

The length of the forewings is 25 mm for males and 29 mm for females.
