= Mictoschema swierstrai =

Scientific classification
- Kingdom: Animalia
- Phylum: Arthropoda
- Class: Insecta
- Order: Lepidoptera
- Family: Geometridae
- Genus: Mictoschema
- Species: M. swierstrai

Binomial name
- Mictoschema swierstrai L. B. Prout, 1922

Species of moth

Mictoschema swierstrai is a moth of the family Geometridae first described by Louis Beethoven Prout in 1922. It is found in South Africa.
