= Hypodoxa paroptila =

Scientific classification
- Kingdom: Animalia
- Phylum: Arthropoda
- Class: Insecta
- Order: Lepidoptera
- Family: Geometridae
- Genus: Hypodoxa
- Species: H. paroptila

Binomial name
- Hypodoxa paroptila (Turner, 1906)

Synonyms
- Pseudoterpna paroptila Turner, 1906

Species of moth

Hypodoxa paroptila is a moth of the family Geometridae first described by Alfred Jefferis Turner in 1906. It is found in Australia, including Queensland.
