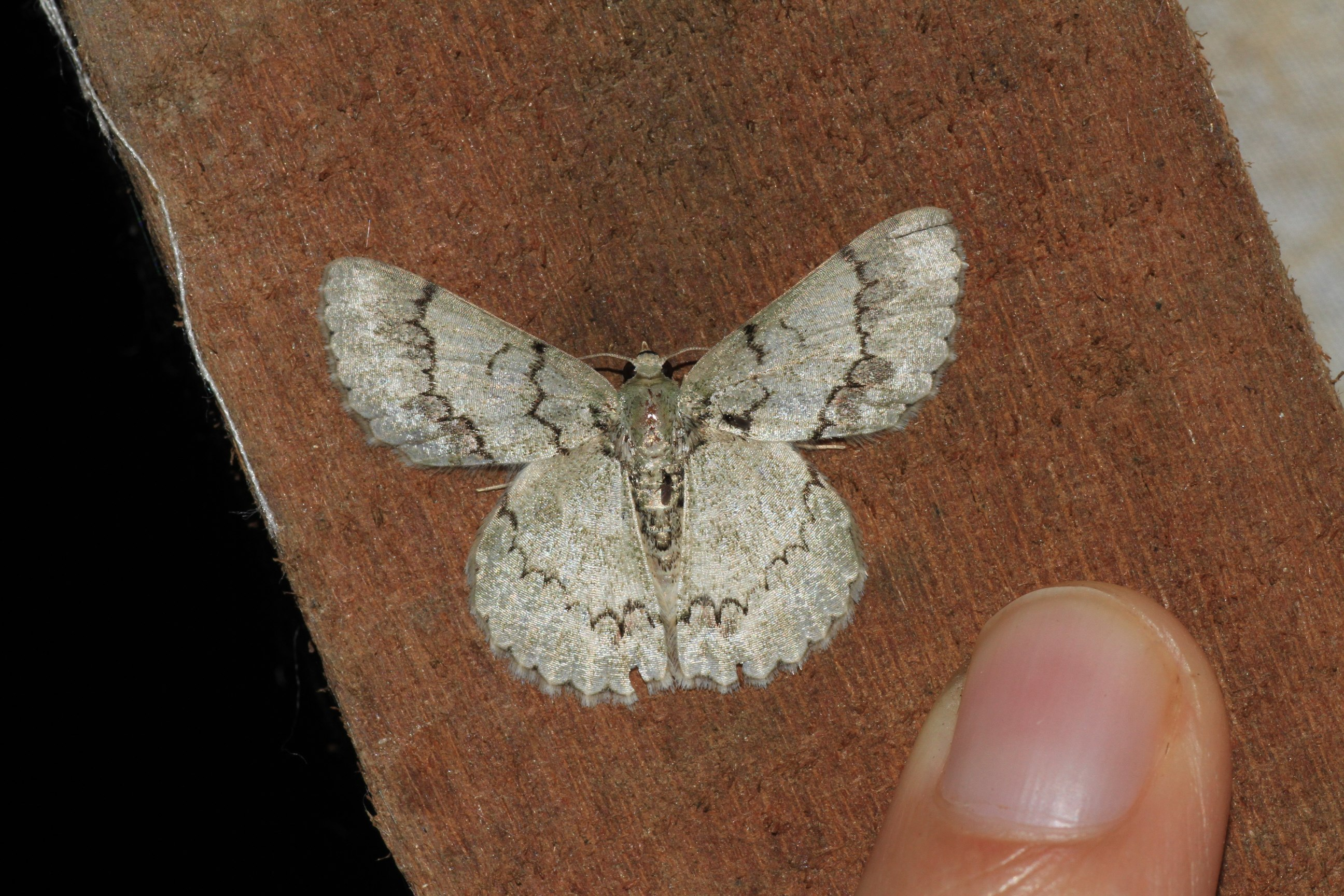

Scientific classification
- Kingdom: Animalia
- Phylum: Arthropoda
- Class: Insecta
- Order: Lepidoptera
- Family: Geometridae
- Genus: Epipristis
- Species: E. nelearia

Binomial name
- Epipristis nelearia (Guenée, [1858])

Synonyms
- Hypochroma nelearia Guenée, 1858

= Epipristis nelearia =

Species of moth

Epipristis nelearia is a moth of the family Geometridae first described by Achille Guenée in 1858. It is found in China (Hainan, Guangxi), India, the north-eastern Himalaya, the Philippines, Malaysia, Indonesia and Australia.

The length of the forewings is 12–15 mm for both males and females. The wings are greyish green.

== Subspecies ==
- Epipristis nelearia nelearia
- Epipristis nelearia accessa Prout, 1937
