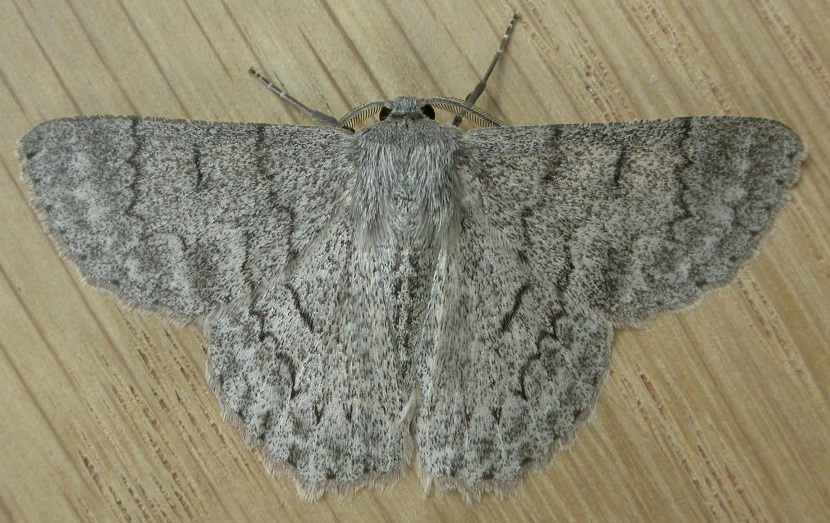
- Crypsiphona ocultaria

Scientific classification
- Kingdom: Animalia
- Phylum: Arthropoda
- Class: Insecta
- Order: Lepidoptera
- Family: Geometridae
- Tribe: Pseudoterpnini
- Genus: Crypsiphona; Meyrick, 1888

= Crypsiphona =

Genus of moths

Crypsiphona is a genus of moths in the family Geometridae.

== Species ==
- Crypsiphona amaura Meyrick, 1888
- Crypsiphona melanosema Meyrick, 1888
- Crypsiphona ocultaria (Donovan, 1805)
