= Crypsiphona amaura =

Scientific classification
- Kingdom: Animalia
- Phylum: Arthropoda
- Class: Insecta
- Order: Lepidoptera
- Family: Geometridae
- Genus: Crypsiphona
- Species: C. amaura

Binomial name
- Crypsiphona amaura Meyrick, 1888

Species of moth

Crypsiphona amaura is a moth of the family Geometridae first described by Edward Meyrick in 1888. It is found in the Australian state of Western Australia.
