= Psilotagma =

Scientific classification
- Kingdom: Animalia
- Phylum: Arthropoda
- Class: Insecta
- Order: Lepidoptera
- Family: Geometridae
- Tribe: Pseudoterpnini
- Genus: Psilotagma; Warren, 1894

Genus of moths

Psilotagma is a genus of moths in the family Geometridae described by Warren in 1894.

== Species ==
- Psilotagma decorata Warren, 1894
- Psilotagma pictaria (Moore, 1888)
