= Austroterpna idiographa =

Scientific classification
- Kingdom: Animalia
- Phylum: Arthropoda
- Class: Insecta
- Order: Lepidoptera
- Family: Geometridae
- Genus: Austroterpna
- Species: A. idiographa

Binomial name
- Austroterpna idiographa Goldfinch, 1929

Species of moth

Austroterpna idiographa is a moth of the family Geometridae first described by Gilbert M. Goldfinch in 1929. It is found in New South Wales, Australia.
