= Metallolophia purpurivenata =

Scientific classification
- Kingdom: Animalia
- Phylum: Arthropoda
- Clade: Pancrustacea
- Class: Insecta
- Order: Lepidoptera
- Family: Geometridae
- Genus: Metallolophia
- Species: M. purpurivenata

Binomial name
- Metallolophia purpurivenata Han & Xue, [2004]

Species of moth

Metallolophia purpurivenata is a moth of the family Geometridae first described by Da-Yong Xue and Hong-Xiang Han in 2004. It is found in Guangxi, China.
