= Metallolophia inanularia =

Scientific classification
- Kingdom: Animalia
- Phylum: Arthropoda
- Clade: Pancrustacea
- Class: Insecta
- Order: Lepidoptera
- Family: Geometridae
- Genus: Metallolophia
- Species: M. inanularia

Binomial name
- Metallolophia inanularia Han & Xue, [2004]

Species of moth

Metallolophia inanularia is a moth of the family Geometridae first described by Hong-Xiang Han and Da-Yong Xue in 2004. It is found in Guangxi, China.
