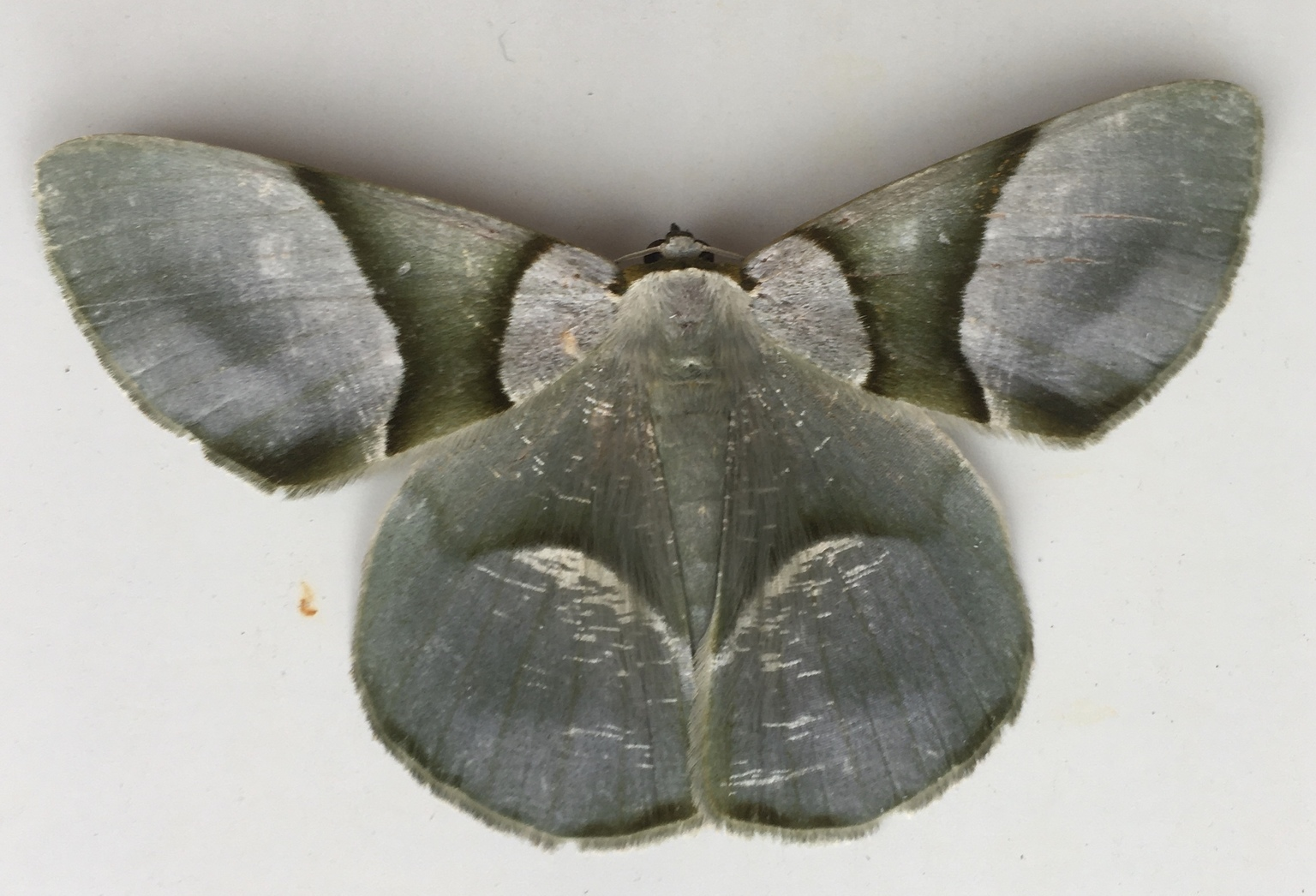
- Male specimen from Phouvong, Attapu, Laos

Scientific classification
- Kingdom: Animalia
- Phylum: Arthropoda
- Class: Insecta
- Order: Lepidoptera
- Family: Geometridae
- Subfamily: Geometrinae
- Tribe: Pseudoterpnini
- Genus: Calleremites; Warren, 1894
- Species: C. subornata

Binomial name
- Calleremites subornata Warren, 1894

= Calleremites =

Genus of moths

Calleremites is a monotypic moth genus in the family Geometridae. Its only species, Calleremites subornata, is found in China, Sikkim in India and Myanmar. Both the genus and species were first described by William Warren in 1894 and it has only been seen three times since then, the latest in a forest in northern Myanmar.

Adults have grey and olive-green wings with fine striations particularly on the hindwings. Warren stated the "expanse of wings" to be 64mm.
