= Epipristis roseus =

Scientific classification
- Kingdom: Animalia
- Phylum: Arthropoda
- Clade: Pancrustacea
- Class: Insecta
- Order: Lepidoptera
- Family: Geometridae
- Genus: Epipristis
- Species: E. roseus

Binomial name
- Epipristis roseus Expósito & H.X. Han, 2009

Species of moth

Epipristis roseus is a moth of the family Geometridae. It is found in China (Inner Mongolia).

The length of the forewings is 13.5–14.5 mm for males and 15–16 mm for females.
