= Hypodoxa regina =

Scientific classification
- Kingdom: Animalia
- Phylum: Arthropoda
- Clade: Pancrustacea
- Class: Insecta
- Order: Lepidoptera
- Family: Geometridae
- Genus: Hypodoxa
- Species: H. regina

Binomial name
- Hypodoxa regina L. B. Prout, 1916

Species of moth

Hypodoxa regina is a moth of the family Geometridae first described by Louis Beethoven Prout in 1916. It is found on New Guinea.

== Subspecies ==
- Hypodoxa regina regina (Rook Island)
- Hypodoxa regina pallida Joicey & Talbot, 1917 (New Guinea)
