= Metallolophia devecisi =

Scientific classification
- Kingdom: Animalia
- Phylum: Arthropoda
- Class: Insecta
- Order: Lepidoptera
- Family: Geometridae
- Genus: Metallolophia
- Species: M. devecisi

Binomial name
- Metallolophia devecisi Herbulot, 1989

Species of moth

Metallolophia devecisi is a moth of the family Geometridae first described by Claude Herbulot in 1989. It is found in western Malaysia.
