= Epipristis oxyodonta =

Scientific classification
- Kingdom: Animalia
- Phylum: Arthropoda
- Class: Insecta
- Order: Lepidoptera
- Family: Geometridae
- Genus: Epipristis
- Species: E. oxyodonta

Binomial name
- Epipristis oxyodonta L. B. Prout, 1934

Species of moth

Epipristis oxyodonta is a moth of the family Geometridae first described by Louis Beethoven Prout in 1934. It is found in Western Australia, the Northern Territory and Queensland in Australia.
