= Metallolophia vitticosta =

Scientific classification
- Kingdom: Animalia
- Phylum: Arthropoda
- Class: Insecta
- Order: Lepidoptera
- Family: Geometridae
- Genus: Metallolophia
- Species: M. vitticosta

Binomial name
- Metallolophia vitticosta (Walker, 1860)

Synonyms
- Hypochroma vitticosta Walker, 1860

Species of moth

Metallolophia vitticosta is a moth of the family Geometridae first described by Francis Walker in 1860. It is found on Peninsular Malaysia, Sumatra and Borneo. The habitat consists of lowland forests and lower montane forests.

Adults are uniform brown with a pale zone along the forewing costa.
