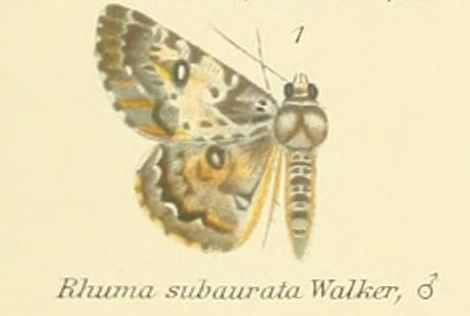

Scientific classification
- Kingdom: Animalia
- Phylum: Arthropoda
- Class: Insecta
- Order: Lepidoptera
- Family: Geometridae
- Genus: Rhuma
- Species: R. subaurata

Binomial name
- Rhuma subaurata Walker, 1860

= Rhuma subaurata =

Species of moth

Rhuma subaurata is a moth of the family Geometridae first described by Francis Walker in 1860. It is found in the Australian states of Queensland and New South Wales.
