= Hypodoxa deteriorata =

Scientific classification
- Kingdom: Animalia
- Phylum: Arthropoda
- Class: Insecta
- Order: Lepidoptera
- Family: Geometridae
- Genus: Hypodoxa
- Species: H. deteriorata

Binomial name
- Hypodoxa deteriorata (Walker, 1860)

Synonyms
- Boarmia nigraria Felder & Rogenhofer, 1875; Thallogama nigraria; Selidosema zascia Meyrick, 1892; Boarmia phaeopasta Turner, 1947

Species of moth

Hypodoxa deteriorata is a moth of the family Geometridae first described by Francis Walker in 1860. It is found in Australia, including New South Wales and Victoria.
