= Epipristis minimaria =

Scientific classification
- Kingdom: Animalia
- Phylum: Arthropoda
- Class: Insecta
- Order: Lepidoptera
- Family: Geometridae
- Genus: Epipristis
- Species: E. minimaria

Binomial name
- Epipristis minimaria (Guenée, [1858])

Synonyms
- Hypochroma minimaria Guenée, [1858]; Hypochroma parvula Walker, 1860

Species of moth

Epipristis minimaria is a moth of the family Geometridae described by Achille Guenée in 1858. It lives in India, Bhutan, Myanmar, Sri Lanka, Indonesia and Hainan and Yunnan provinces in China

== Description ==
The length of the forewings is 11–20 mm for males and about 26 mm for females. Antennae of the male are most simple. Wings have crenulate (scalloped) margins. Hind tibiae of the male are dilated. The wings are greyish white, diffused with red-brown, grey-brown and black-brown scales. The forewings' antemedial lines are more regularly waved. The outer area is pinkish beyond and before the submarginal line. The outer margins of both wings are wavy.
