= Psilotagma pictaria =

Scientific classification
- Kingdom: Animalia
- Phylum: Arthropoda
- Class: Insecta
- Order: Lepidoptera
- Family: Geometridae
- Genus: Psilotagma
- Species: P. pictaria

Binomial name
- Psilotagma pictaria (Moore, 1888)

Synonyms
- Pachyodes pictaria Moore, 1888; Terpna pictaria

Species of moth

Psilotagma pictaria is a moth of the family Geometridae first described by Frederic Moore in 1888. It is found in India and Nepal.
