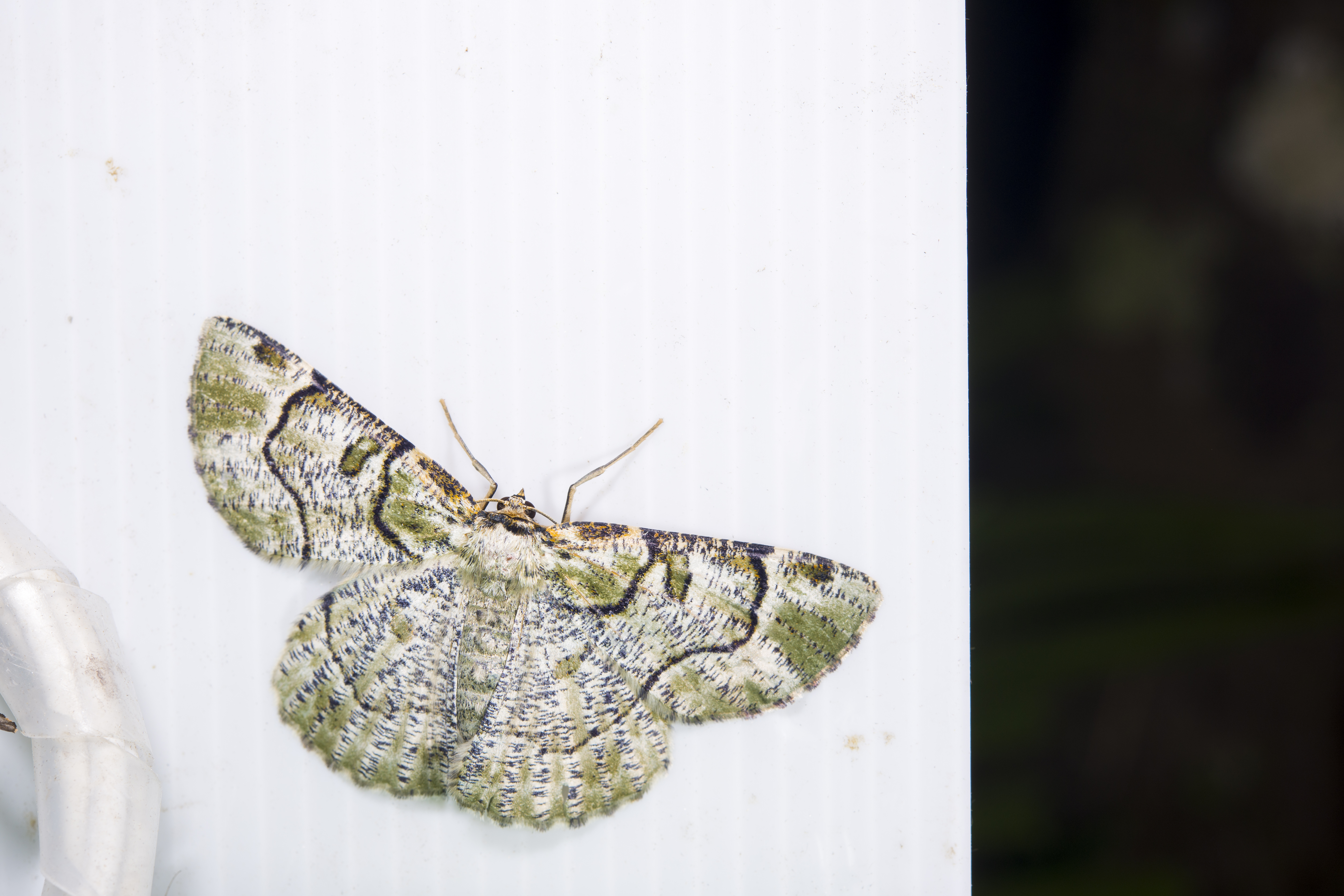

Scientific classification
- Kingdom: Animalia
- Phylum: Arthropoda
- Clade: Pancrustacea
- Class: Insecta
- Order: Lepidoptera
- Family: Geometridae
- Genus: Metallolophia
- Species: M. arenaria

Binomial name
- Metallolophia arenaria (Leech, 1889)

Synonyms
- Pachyodes arenaria Leech, 1889; Pachyodes arenaria; Pseudoterpna arenaria; Hypochroma danielaria Oberthür, 1913

= Metallolophia arenaria =

Species of moth

Metallolophia arenaria is a moth of the family Geometridae first described by John Henry Leech in 1889. It is found in China (Hunan, Zhejiang, Yunnan, Fujian, Jiangxi, Sichuan) and Taiwan.
