= Epipristis storthophora =

Scientific classification
- Kingdom: Animalia
- Phylum: Arthropoda
- Class: Insecta
- Order: Lepidoptera
- Family: Geometridae
- Genus: Epipristis
- Species: E. storthophora

Binomial name
- Epipristis storthophora L. B. Prout, 1937

Species of moth

Epipristis storthophora is a moth of the family Geometridae first described by Louis Beethoven Prout in 1937. It is found on Bali in Indonesia.
