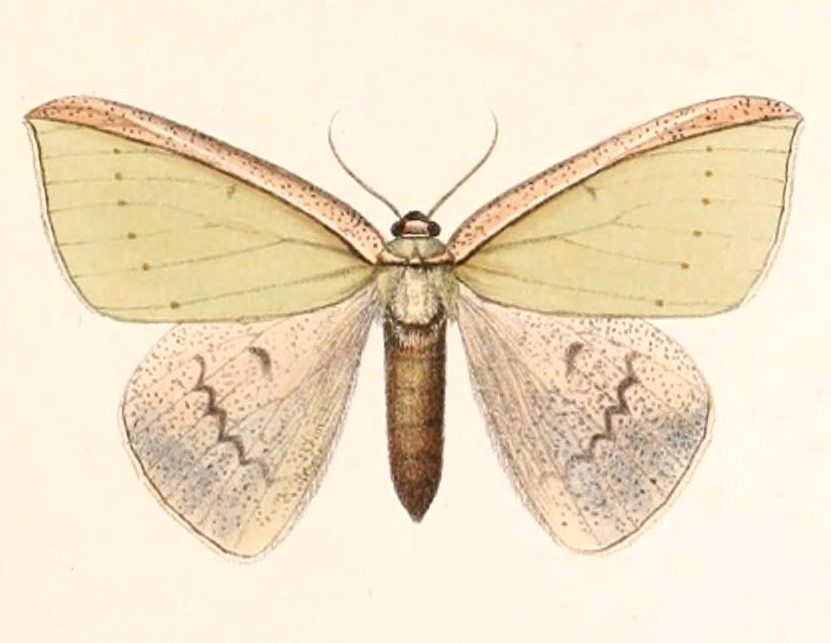

Scientific classification
- Kingdom: Animalia
- Phylum: Arthropoda
- Class: Insecta
- Order: Lepidoptera
- Family: Geometridae
- Genus: Limbatochlamys
- Species: L. rosthorni

Binomial name
- Limbatochlamys rosthorni Rothschild, 1894

= Limbatochlamys rosthorni =

Species of moth

Limbatochlamys rosthorni is a moth of the family Geometridae first described by Walter Rothschild in 1894. It is found in China (Shaanxi, Gansu, Shanghai, Jiangsu, Zhejiang, Hubei, Jiangxi, Hunan, Fujian, Guangxi, Sichuan, Chongqing, Guizhou and Yunnan).

The length of the forewings is 28–37 mm for males and 38 mm for females.
