= Pseudoterpnini =

- Jersey emerald (Pseudoterpna coronillaria)

Scientific classification
- Kingdom: Animalia
- Phylum: Arthropoda
- Class: Insecta
- Order: Lepidoptera
- Family: Geometridae
- Subfamily: Geometrinae
- Tribe: Pseudoterpnini; Warren, 1893

Synonyms
- Pseudoterpninae; Terpnini Inoue, 1961; Archaeobalbini Viidalepp, 1981; Pingasini Heppner & Inoue, 1992

Tribe of moths

The Pseudoterpnini are a tribe of geometer moths in the subfamily Geometrinae. The tribe was described by Warren in 1893. It was alternatively treated as subtribe Pseudoterpniti by Jeremy Daniel Holloway in 1996.

== Distribution ==
Pseudoterpnini are widely distributed in the Old World, from western Europe to the western Pacific, in temperate, subtropical and tropical regions.

== Diversity ==
The tribe consists of over 300 species in 34 genera:

- Absala Swinhoe, 1893
- Actenochroma Warren, 1893
- Aeolochroma Prout, 1912
- Aplasta Hübner, [1823] 1816
- Austroterpna Goldfinch, 1929
- Calleremites Warren, 1894
- Crypsiphona Meyrick, 1888
- Cyneoterpna Prout, 1912 (=Autanepsia Turner, 1910)
- Dindica Moore, 1888 (=Perissolophia Warren, 1893)
- Dindicodes Prout, 1912
- Epipristis Meyrick, 1888 (=Terpnidia Butler, 1892, Pingarmia Sterneck, 1927)
- Heliomystis Meyrick, 1888
- Herochroma Swinhoe, 1893 (=Chloroclydon Warren, 1894, Archaeobalbis Prout, 1912, Neobalbis Prout, 1912)
- Holoterpna Püngeler, 1900
- Hypobapta Prout, 1912 (=Hypochroma Guenée, [1858])
- Hypodoxa Prout, 1912
- Limbatochlamys Rothschild, 1894
- Lophophelma Prout, 1912
- Lophothorax Turner, 1939
- Metallolophia Warren, 1895
- Metaterpna Yazaki, 1992
- Mictoschema Prout, 1922
- Mimandria Warren, 1895
- Orthorisma Prout, 1912 (=Orthocraspeda Prout, 1912)
- Pachista Prout, 1912
- Pachyodes Guenée, [1858] (=Archaeopseustes Warren, 1894)
- Paraterpna Goldfinch, 1929
- Pingasa Moore, [1887] (=Skorpisthes Lucas, 1900)
- Protophyta Turner, 1910
- Pseudoterpna Hübner, [1823]
- Psilotagma Warren, 1894
- Pullichroma Holloway, 1996
- Rhuma Walker, 1860 (=Sterictopsis Warren, 1898, Oxyphanes Turner, 1936)
- Sundadoxa Holloway, 1996
