= Hypodoxa erebusata =

Scientific classification
- Kingdom: Animalia
- Phylum: Arthropoda
- Class: Insecta
- Order: Lepidoptera
- Family: Geometridae
- Genus: Hypodoxa
- Species: H. erebusata

Binomial name
- Hypodoxa erebusata (Walker, 1860)

Synonyms
- Hypochroma erebusata Walker, 1860; Hypochroma erebata Meyrick, 1888

Species of moth

Hypodoxa erebusata is a moth of the family Geometridae first described by Francis Walker in 1860. It is found in Australia, including Queensland.

The larvae feed on Melaleuca quinquenervia.
