= Hypodoxa viridicoma =

Scientific classification
- Kingdom: Animalia
- Phylum: Arthropoda
- Class: Insecta
- Order: Lepidoptera
- Family: Geometridae
- Genus: Hypodoxa
- Species: H. viridicoma

Binomial name
- Hypodoxa viridicoma (Warren, 1899)

Synonyms
- Hypochroma viridicoma Warren, 1899; Hypochroma viridicoma interrupta Warren, 1902

Species of moth

Hypodoxa viridicoma is a moth of the family Geometridae first described by William Warren in 1899. It is found on the Solomon Islands.
