= Rhuma thiobapta =

Scientific classification
- Kingdom: Animalia
- Phylum: Arthropoda
- Class: Insecta
- Order: Lepidoptera
- Family: Geometridae
- Genus: Rhuma
- Species: R. thiobapta

Binomial name
- Rhuma thiobapta (Turner, 1936)

Synonyms
- Oxyphanes thiobapta Turner, 1936

Species of moth

Rhuma thiobapta is a moth of the family Geometridae first described by Alfred Jefferis Turner in 1936. It is found in Queensland, Australia.
