= Metallolophia opalina =

Scientific classification
- Kingdom: Animalia
- Phylum: Arthropoda
- Class: Insecta
- Order: Lepidoptera
- Family: Geometridae
- Genus: Metallolophia
- Species: M. opalina

Binomial name
- Metallolophia opalina (Warren, 1893)

Synonyms
- Terpna opalina Warren, 1893; Pseudoterpna opalina

Species of moth

Metallolophia opalina is a moth of the family Geometridae first described by William Warren in 1893. It is found in Tibet, China.
