= Hypodoxa horridata =

Scientific classification
- Kingdom: Animalia
- Phylum: Arthropoda
- Class: Insecta
- Order: Lepidoptera
- Family: Geometridae
- Genus: Hypodoxa
- Species: H. horridata

Binomial name
- Hypodoxa horridata (Walker, [1863])

Synonyms
- Hypochroma horridata Walker, 1863

Species of moth

Hypodoxa horridata is a moth of the family Geometridae first described by Francis Walker in 1863. It is found in Australia, including New South Wales.
