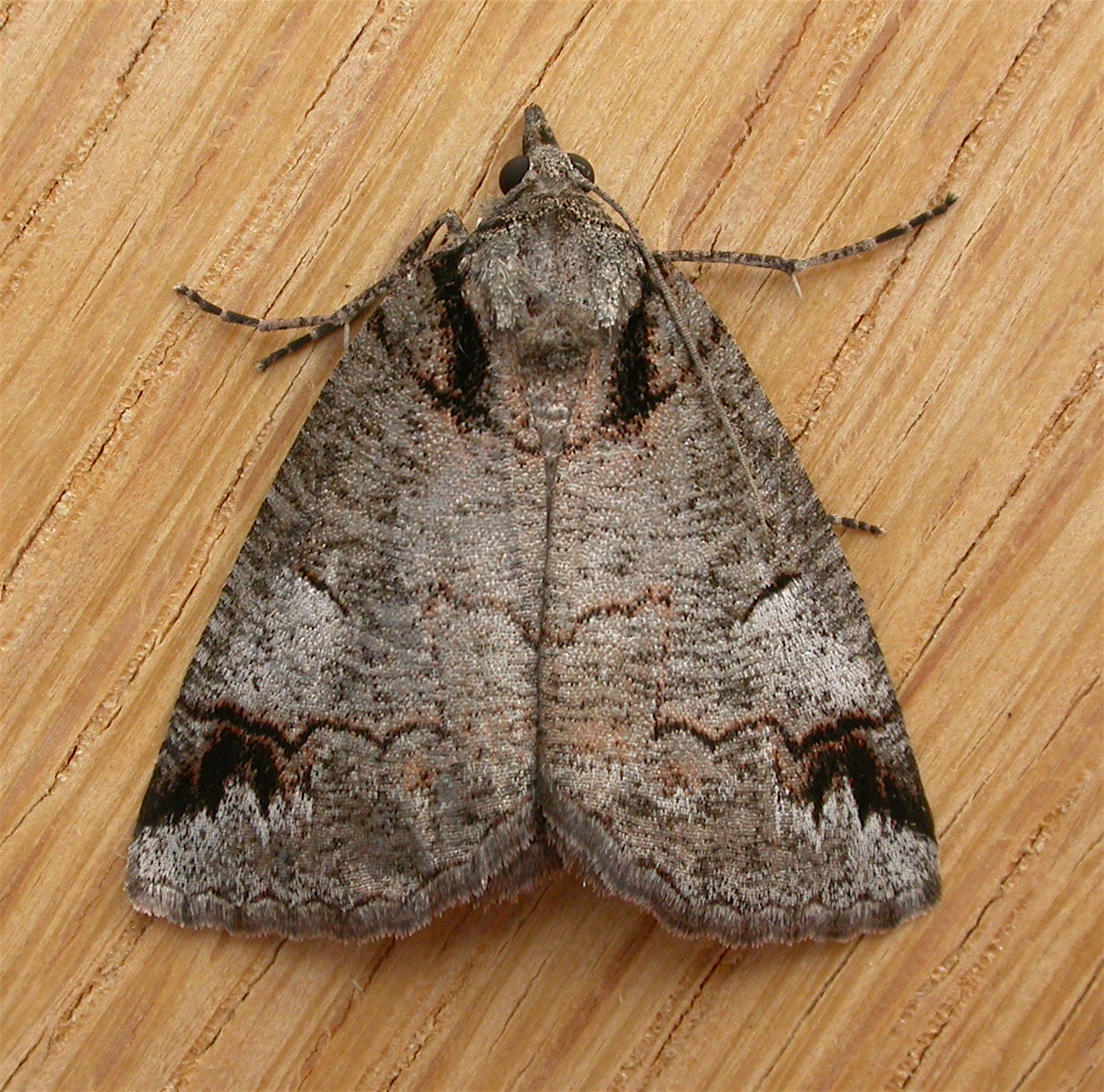

Scientific classification
- Kingdom: Animalia
- Phylum: Arthropoda
- Class: Insecta
- Order: Lepidoptera
- Family: Geometridae
- Genus: Austroterpna
- Species: A. paratorna

Binomial name
- Austroterpna paratorna (Meyrick, 1888)

Synonyms
- Hypochroma paratorna Meyrick, 1888

= Austroterpna paratorna =

Species of moth

Austroterpna paratorna is a moth of the family Geometridae. It is found in most states and territories of Australia (except Tasmania and Western Australia.

It has a wingspan of 3 cm (1.2 in).
