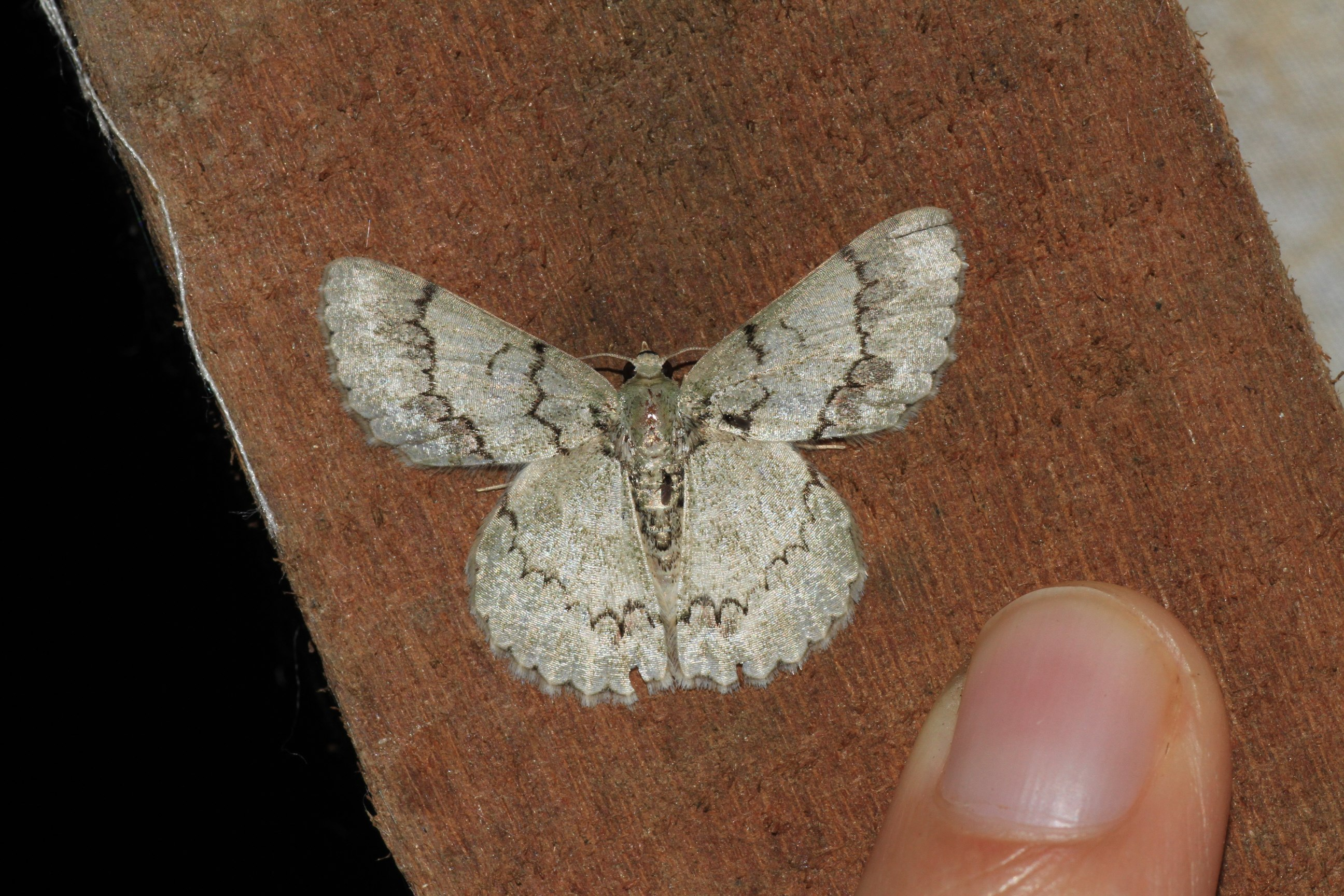
- Epipristis nelearia

Scientific classification
- Kingdom: Animalia
- Phylum: Arthropoda
- Class: Insecta
- Order: Lepidoptera
- Family: Geometridae
- Tribe: Pseudoterpnini
- Genus: Epipristis; Meyrick, 1888

Synonyms
- Terpnidia Butler, 1892; Pingarmia Sterneck, 1927

= Epipristis =

Genus of moths

Epipristis is a genus of moths in the family Geometridae erected by Edward Meyrick in 1888.

== Species ==
- Epipristis minimaria (Guenée, [1858]) (=Hypochroma parvula Walker, 1860)
- Epipristis nelearia (Guenée, [1858])
  - Epipristis nelearia nelearia (Guenée, [1858])
  - Epipristis nelearia accessa Prout, 1937
- Epipristis oxycyma Meyrick, 1888 (=Epipristis australis Goldfinch, 1929)
- Epipristis oxyodonta Prout, 1934
- Epipristis pullusa H.X. Han & D.Y. Xue, 2009
- Epipristis roseus Expósito & H.X. Han, 2009
- Epipristis rufilunata (Warren, 1903)
  - Epipristis rufilunata rufilunata (Warren, 1903) (=Epipristis nelearia viridans Prout, 1916)
  - Epipristis rufilunata antelucana Prout, 1927
- Epipristis storthophora Prout, 1937
- Epipristis transiens (Sterneck, 1927)
- Epipristis truncataria (Walker, 1861)
