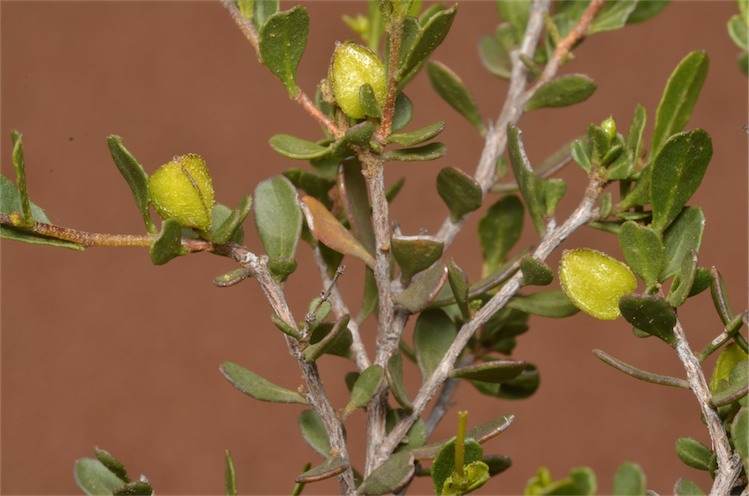
- In Murray Sunset National Park

Scientific classification
- Kingdom: Plantae
- Clade: Tracheophytes
- Clade: Angiosperms
- Clade: Eudicots
- Clade: Rosids
- Order: Sapindales
- Family: Sapindaceae
- Genus: Dodonaea
- Species: D. bursariifolia

Binomial name
- Dodonaea bursariifolia F.Muell.

Synonyms
- Dodonaea bursarifolia F.Muell. orth. var.; Dodonaea bursariifolia F.Muell. var. bursariifolia; Dodonaea bursariifolia var. major Benth.

= Dodonaea bursariifolia =

Species of flowering plant

Dodonaea bursariifolia, commonly known as small hop-bush, is a species of plant in the family Sapindaceae and is endemic to southern inland areas of continental Australia. It is a spreading shrub with simple egg-shaped to lance-shaped leaves, the narrower end towards the base, or oblong leaves, flowers arranged in pairs or threes, oblong capsules usually with three leathery, oblong wings.

== Description ==
Dodonaea bursariifolia is a usually a dioecious, spreading shrub that typically grows to a height of 0.2–2 m (7.9 in – 6 ft 6.7 in). Its leaves are simple, sessile, egg-shaped to lance-shaped with the narrower end towards the base, sometimes oblong, 8–35 mm (0.31–1.38 in) long and 3–15 mm (0.12–0.59 in) wide. The flowers are arranged in pairs or groups of three, rarely in a cyme, each flower on a pedicel 1.5–2.6 mm (0.059–0.102 in) long, usually with five linear or lance-shaped sepals 1.4–3 mm (0.055–0.118 in) long but that fall off as the flowers develop. There are five to eight stamens and the ovary is glabrous. The fruit is a glabrous, oblong capsule, 6.5–8.5 mm (0.26–0.33 in) long and 5–8.5 mm (0.20–0.33 in) wide, with four leathery wings 0.5–1 mm (0.020–0.039 in) wide.

== Taxonomy ==
Dodonaea bursariifolia was first formally described in 1854 by Ferdinand von Mueller in Transactions of the Philosophical Society of Victoria. The specific epithet (bursariifolia) means 'having leaves similar to the genus Bursaria'.

== Distribution and habitat ==
This species of Dodonaea grows in semi-arid mallee and Melaleuca uncinata communities and is common in inland areas of south-western, Western Australia, South Australia, the north-west of Victoria and west and south of Euabalong in New South Wales.
