= A. discolor =

A. discolor may refer to:

- Abacetus discolor, a ground beetle
- Acrobotrys discolor, a plant found in Colombia
- Actenochroma discolor, a synonym of Aeolochroma albifusaria, a moth found in New Guinea
- Adolia discolor, a synonym of Phyllogeiton discolor, a tree native to Africa
- Agabus discolor, a predaceous diving beetle found in North America and the Palearctic
- Agyneta discolor, a sheet weaver found in Colombia
- Alismorkis discolor, a synonym of Calanthe discolor, an orchid native to Japan, China, and Korea
- Alouatta discolor, Spix's red-handed howler, a monkey found in Brazil
- Alstroemeria discolor, a plant native to South America
- Amesia discolor, a synonym of Epipactis helleborine, the broad-leaved helleborine
- Amygdalus discolor, a synonym of Prunus discolor, a shrub native to the Aegean islands, Turkey, and Syria
- Anisoscelis discolor, a leaf-footed bug found in Ecuador
- Anisotoma discolor, a round fungus beetle found in North America
- Antaeotricha discolor, a moth found in Mexico and Guatemala
- Aquilegia discolor, the two-coloured columbine, a plant found in Spain
- Aristeguietia discolor, a plant found in Peru
- Artemisia discolor, a synonym for two different plants found in North America:
  - Artemisia franserioides, ragweed sagebrush
  - Artemisia ludoviciana, silver woodworm
- Asclera discolor, a false blister beetle found in North America
- Aspidosperma discolor, a tree native to Brazil
- Asterotrichion discolor, a plant found in Tasmania
- Astragalus discolor, a plant
- Avatha discolor, a moth found in the Indo-Australian and Pacific tropics
  - Athyrma discolor, a synonym of Avatha discolor
