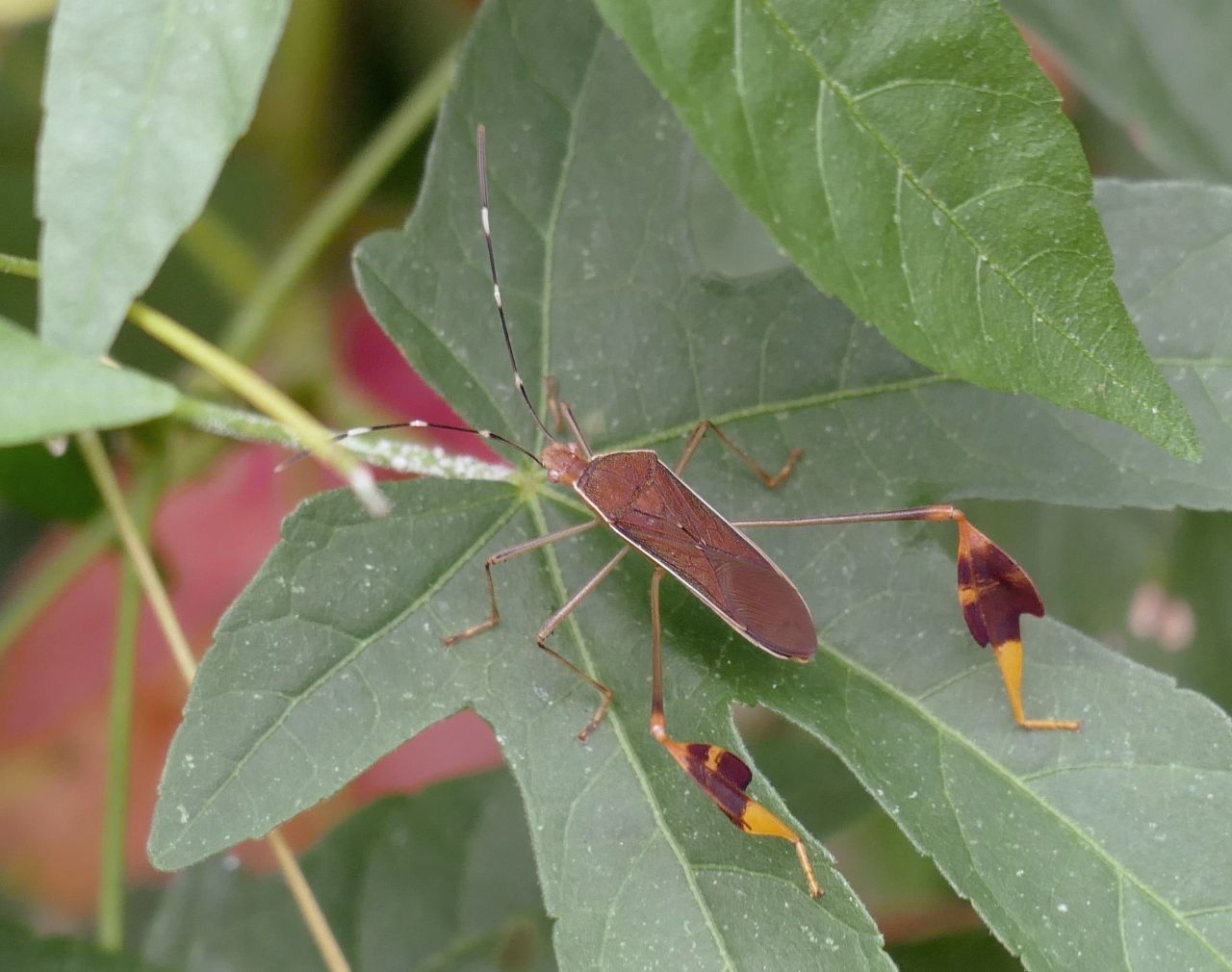

Scientific classification
- Kingdom: Animalia
- Phylum: Arthropoda
- Class: Insecta
- Order: Hemiptera
- Suborder: Heteroptera
- Family: Coreidae
- Tribe: Anisoscelini
- Genus: Anisoscelis
- Species: A. marginellus

Binomial name
- Anisoscelis marginellus Dallas, 1852

= Anisoscelis marginellus =

Species of true bug

Anisoscelis marginellus is a species of leaf-footed bug in the family Coreidae. It was first described by William Dallas in 1852 and it has been recorded in Brazil and Argentina. It was previously considered a subspecies of A. foliaceus
