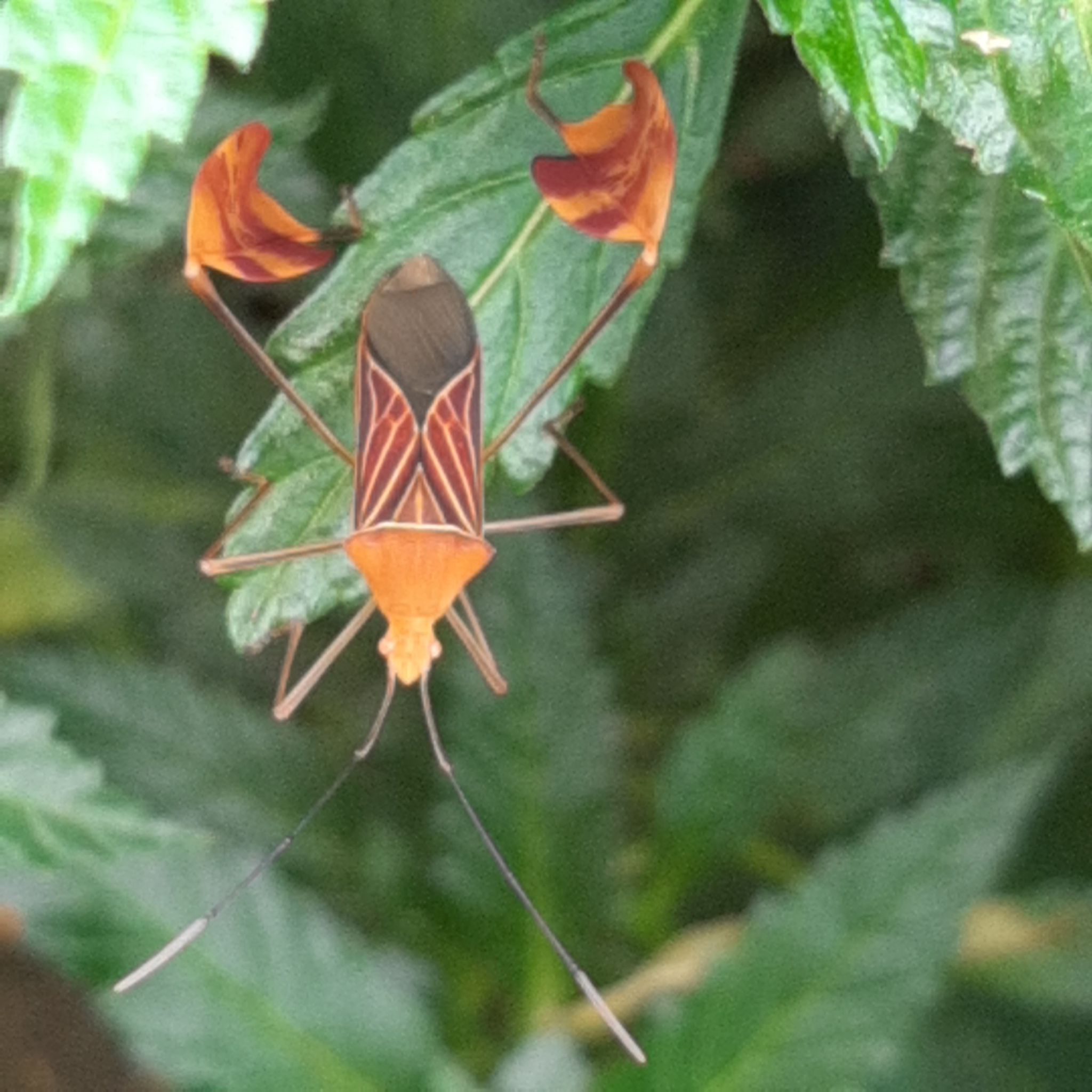

Scientific classification
- Kingdom: Animalia
- Phylum: Arthropoda
- Class: Insecta
- Order: Hemiptera
- Suborder: Heteroptera
- Family: Coreidae
- Tribe: Anisoscelini
- Genus: Bitta
- Species: B. podalica

Binomial name
- Bitta podalica (Brailovsky & Mayorga, 1995)

= Bitta podalica =

Species of true bug

Bitta podalica is a species of leaf-footed bug in the family Coreidae. It was first described by Brailovsky and Mayorga in 1995 in the genus Anisoscelis. it has been recorded in Costa Rica.
