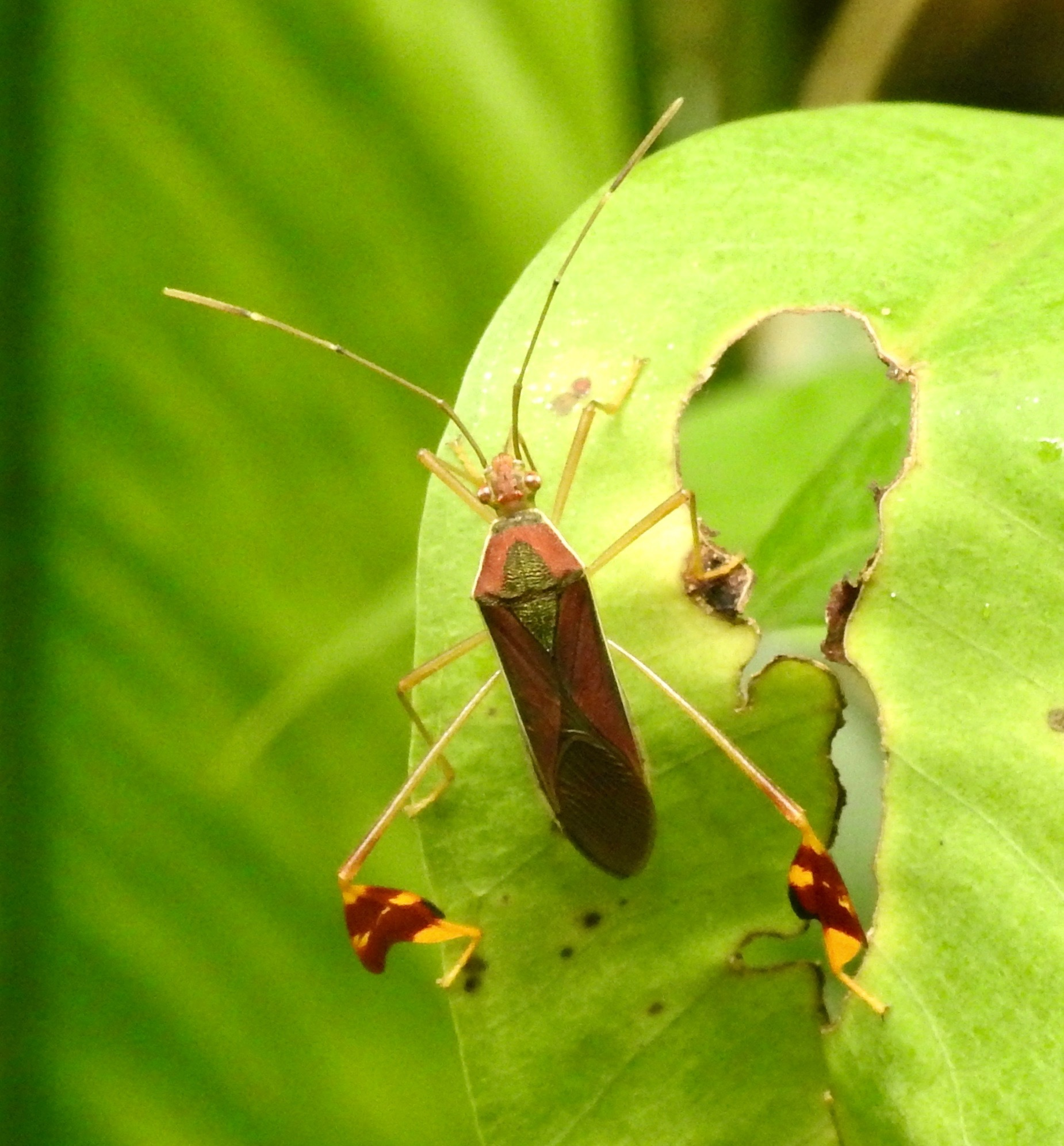

Scientific classification
- Kingdom: Animalia
- Phylum: Arthropoda
- Clade: Pancrustacea
- Class: Insecta
- Order: Hemiptera
- Suborder: Heteroptera
- Family: Coreidae
- Tribe: Anisoscelini
- Genus: Anisoscelis
- Species: A. scutellaris

Binomial name
- Anisoscelis scutellaris Stål, 1870

= Anisoscelis scutellaris =

Species of true bug

Anisoscelis scutellaris is a species of leaf-footed bug in the family Coreidae endemic to Colombia. It was first described by Swedish entomologist Carl Stål in 1870.
