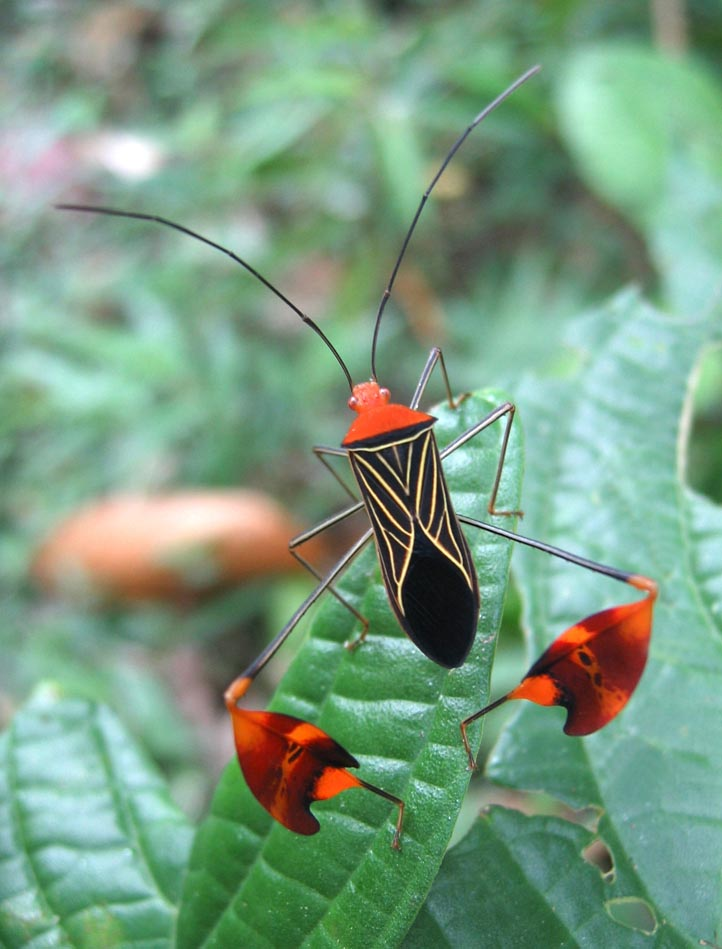

Scientific classification
- Kingdom: Animalia
- Phylum: Arthropoda
- Clade: Pancrustacea
- Class: Insecta
- Order: Hemiptera
- Suborder: Heteroptera
- Family: Coreidae
- Tribe: Anisoscelini
- Genus: Bitta
- Species: B. alipes

Binomial name
- Bitta alipes (Guérin-Méneville, 1833)

Synonyms
- Bitta flavolineata (Blanchard, 1849); Bitta flavolineatus (Blanchard, 1849)

= Bitta alipes =

Species of true bug

The matador bug, Bitta alipes, is a species of leaf-footed bug in the family Coreidae. It has been observed in Costa Rica, Colombia, Panama, Ecuador, Venezuela, and Mexico. It was first described by French entomologist Félix Édouard Guérin-Méneville in 1833. Anisoscelis flavolineatus, previously considered a distinct species, is currently considered a synonym of B. alipes.

The large colourful flags on the legs are not used in reproductive competition, but appears to have an aposematic anti-predator function with birds. The animals accumulate cyanogens from their host plants, chiefly cyanogenic Passiflora plants, making them unpalatable or even lethally toxic to vertebrate predators.
