= Anisoscelis caeruleipennis =

Scientific classification
- Kingdom: Animalia
- Phylum: Arthropoda
- Clade: Pancrustacea
- Class: Insecta
- Order: Hemiptera
- Suborder: Heteroptera
- Family: Coreidae
- Tribe: Anisoscelini
- Genus: Anisoscelis
- Species: A. caeruleipennis

Binomial name
- Anisoscelis caeruleipennis Guérin-Méneville, 1838

Species of true bug

Anisoscelis caeruleipennis is a species of leaf-footed bug in the family Coreidae. It was first described by French entomologist Félix Édouard Guérin-Méneville in 1838. Its status as a member of genus Anisoscelis was disputed in 2014.
