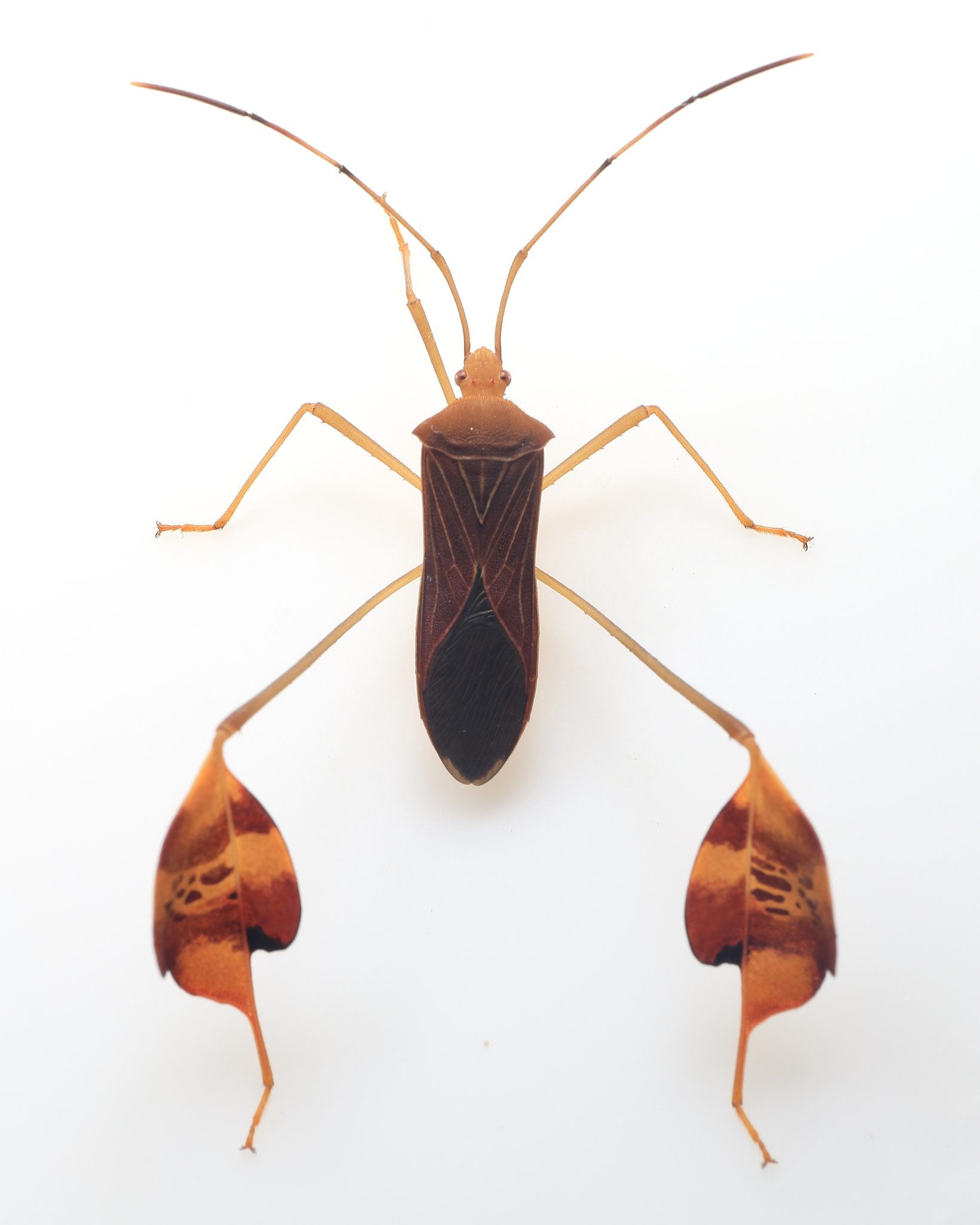

Scientific classification
- Kingdom: Animalia
- Phylum: Arthropoda
- Class: Insecta
- Order: Hemiptera
- Suborder: Heteroptera
- Family: Coreidae
- Tribe: Anisoscelini
- Genus: Bitta
- Species: B. affinis

Binomial name
- Bitta affinis (Westwood, 1840)

= Bitta affinis =

Species of true bug

Bitta affinis, the flag-footed bug, is a species of leaf-footed bug in the family Coreidae. It is found in Central America and Mexico. It was first described by English entomologist John O. Westwood in 1840 as an insect found in Mexico, with no additional location information. In Introduction to Entomology, part of The Naturalist's Library by James Duncan, the species is described as similar, but distinct from, Anisoscelis hymenipherus, and native to Mexico: "A third species, undescribed, closely allied to the latter, but smaller, with the thorax and hemelytra entirely fulvous red, and the legs entirely pale ochreous, is contained in the collection of the Jardin des Plantes, and to which the specific name of affinis may be applied."
