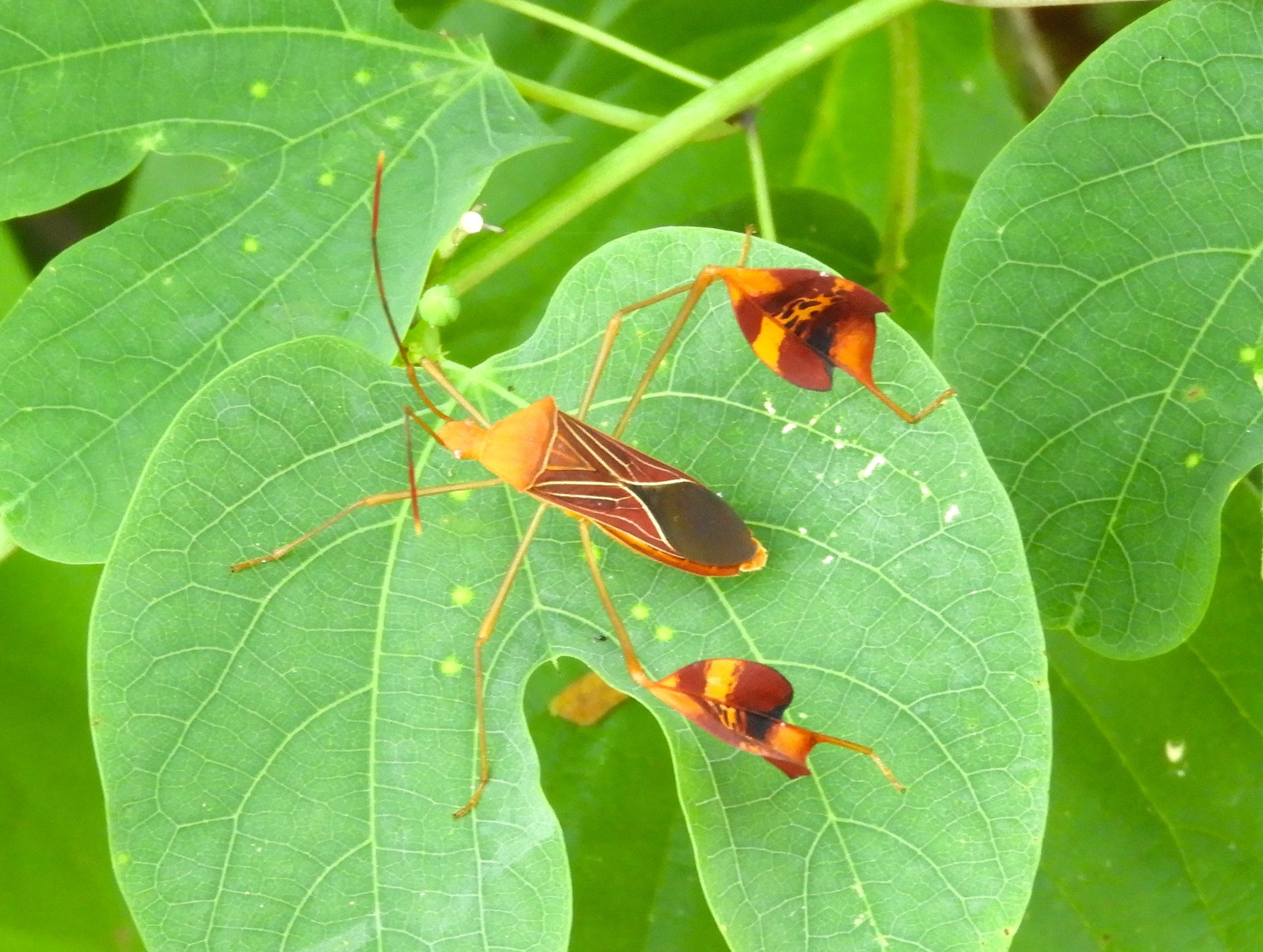

Scientific classification
- Kingdom: Animalia
- Phylum: Arthropoda
- Class: Insecta
- Order: Hemiptera
- Suborder: Heteroptera
- Family: Coreidae
- Tribe: Anisoscelini
- Genus: Bitta
- Species: B. lurida

Binomial name
- Bitta lurida (Brailovsky, 2016)

= Bitta lurida =

Species of true bug

Bitta lurida is a species of leaf-footed bug in the family Coreidae. It was first described by Harry Brailovsky in 2016 and it has been recorded in Texas, Mexico, Central and South America.
