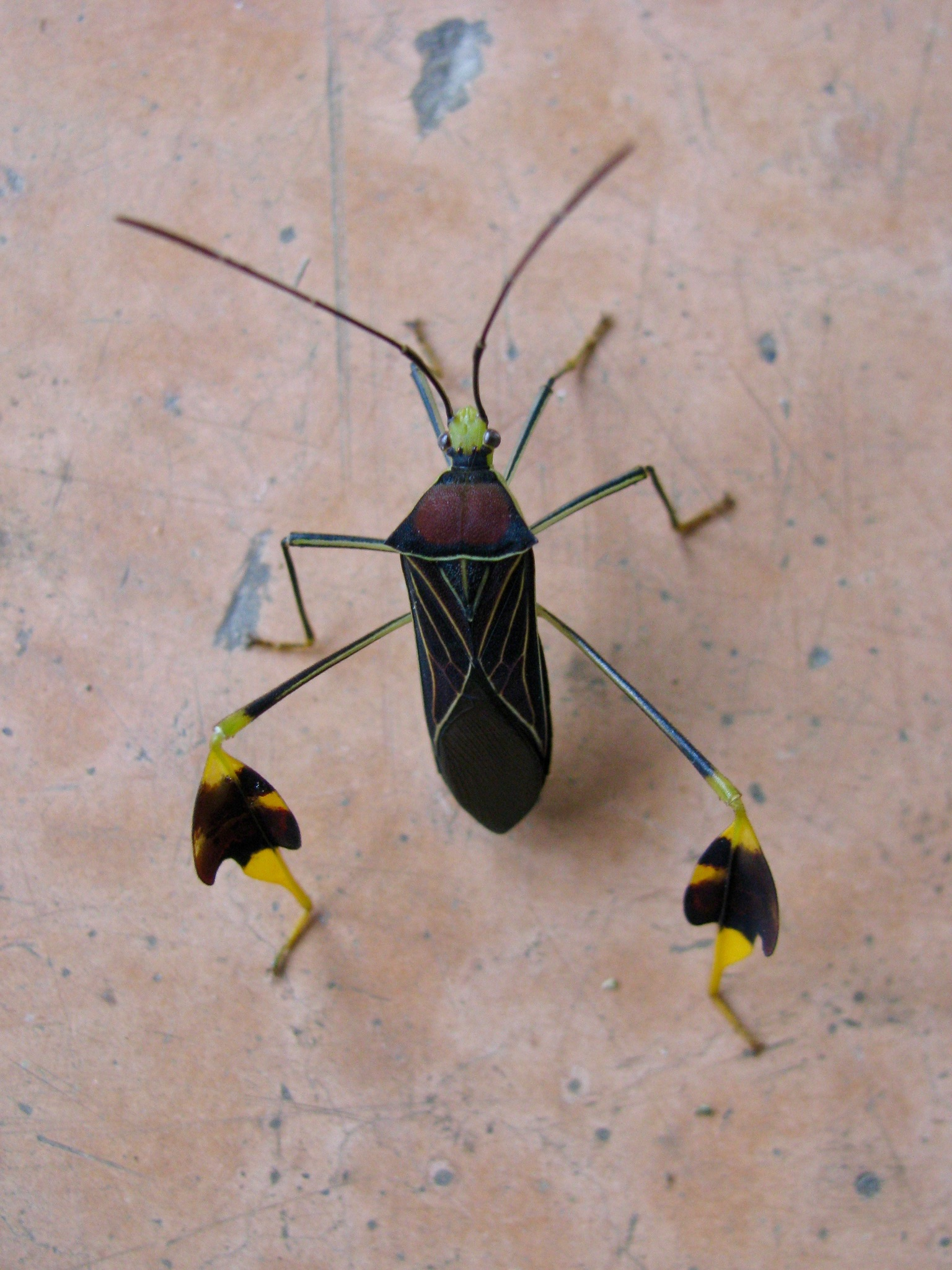

Scientific classification
- Kingdom: Animalia
- Phylum: Arthropoda
- Class: Insecta
- Order: Hemiptera
- Suborder: Heteroptera
- Family: Coreidae
- Tribe: Anisoscelini
- Genus: Bitta
- Species: B. gradadius

Binomial name
- Bitta gradadius (Distant, 1881)

= Bitta gradadius =

Species of true bug

Bitta gradadius is a species of leaf-footed bug in the family Coreidae. It occurs in Central America and has been observed in Guatemala, Costa Rica, and Panama. It was first described by British entomologist William Lucas Distant in 1881.
