= Aquilegia guarensis =

Scientific classification
- Kingdom: Plantae
- Clade: Tracheophytes
- Clade: Angiosperms
- Clade: Eudicots
- Order: Ranunculales
- Family: Ranunculaceae
- Genus: Aquilegia
- Species: A. guarensis

Binomial name
- Aquilegia guarensis Losa

Synonyms
- Aquilegia pyrenaica subsp. guarensis (Losa) Pereda & M.Laínz; Aquilegia viscosa subsp. guarensis (Losa) J.M.Monts.

Species of flowering plant

Aquilegia guarensis is a perennial flowering plant in the family Ranunculaceae, native to the Pyrenees.

== Description ==
Aquilegia guarensis is a perennial herbaceous plant growing to 30 cm (12 in) in height. It has a thick rhizome and its stem and leaves are covered with more or less silky glandular surface hairs. The stem bears dead leaves from previous seasons' growth and several long-stalked leaves, which are biternate, round-lobed, and somewhat sticky. Each flower stalk is branched and bears multiple medium-sized blue-white flowers with pointed egg-shaped sepals and pale whitish-violet petals with slightly curved nectar spurs measuring 10–11 mm long. The stamens are roughly the same length as the petals.

== Taxonomy ==
Aquilegia guarensis was formally described by the Spanish botanist Taurino Mariano Losa in 1948 from specimens collected in the Sierra de Guara in the Spanish Pyrenees. Losa judged it to be most closely related to Aquilegia discolor, differing in size, the degree of branching and number of flowers on its stems, and in the characteristics of its flowers.

Although it is now accepted as a distinct species, it has previously been classified as a subspecies of Aquilegia pyrenaica by José María Pereda and Manuel Laínz in 1967 and of Aquilegia viscosa by Josep Maria Montserrat Martí in 1984.

=== Etymology ===
The specific epithet guarensis means "of Guara", referring to the Sierra de Guara where the species was first found.

== Distribution and habitat ==
Aquilegia guarensis is native to the Pyrenees of France and Spain. It grows on steep slopes above the treeline at altitudes of 1,500–1,800 m (4,900–5,900 ft).

== Conservation ==
As of January 2025, the species has not been assessed for the IUCN Red List.
