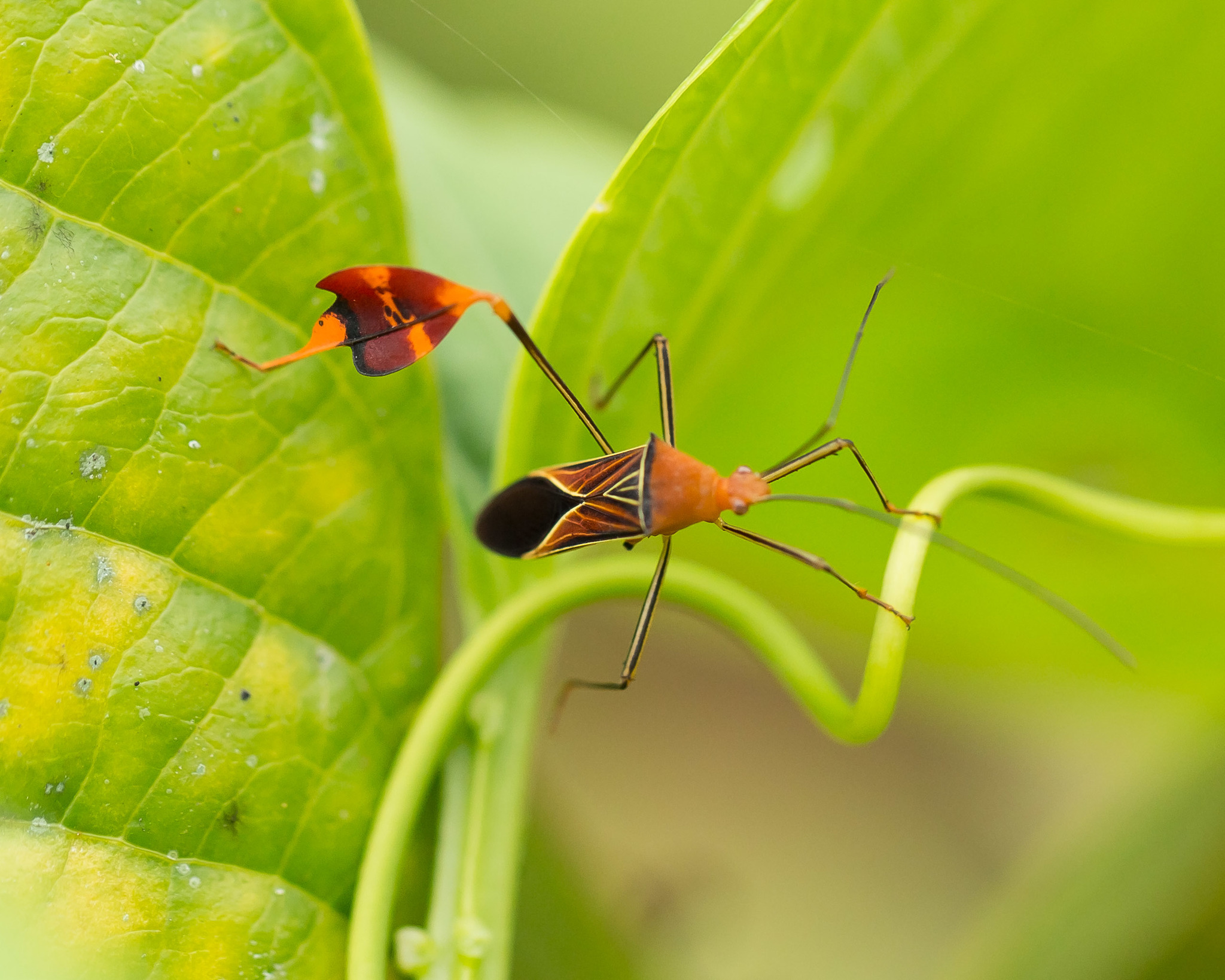

Scientific classification
- Kingdom: Animalia
- Phylum: Arthropoda
- Class: Insecta
- Order: Hemiptera
- Suborder: Heteroptera
- Family: Coreidae
- Tribe: Anisoscelini
- Genus: Bitta
- Species: B. hymeniphera

Binomial name
- Bitta hymeniphera (Westwood, 1840)

= Bitta hymeniphera =

Species of true bug

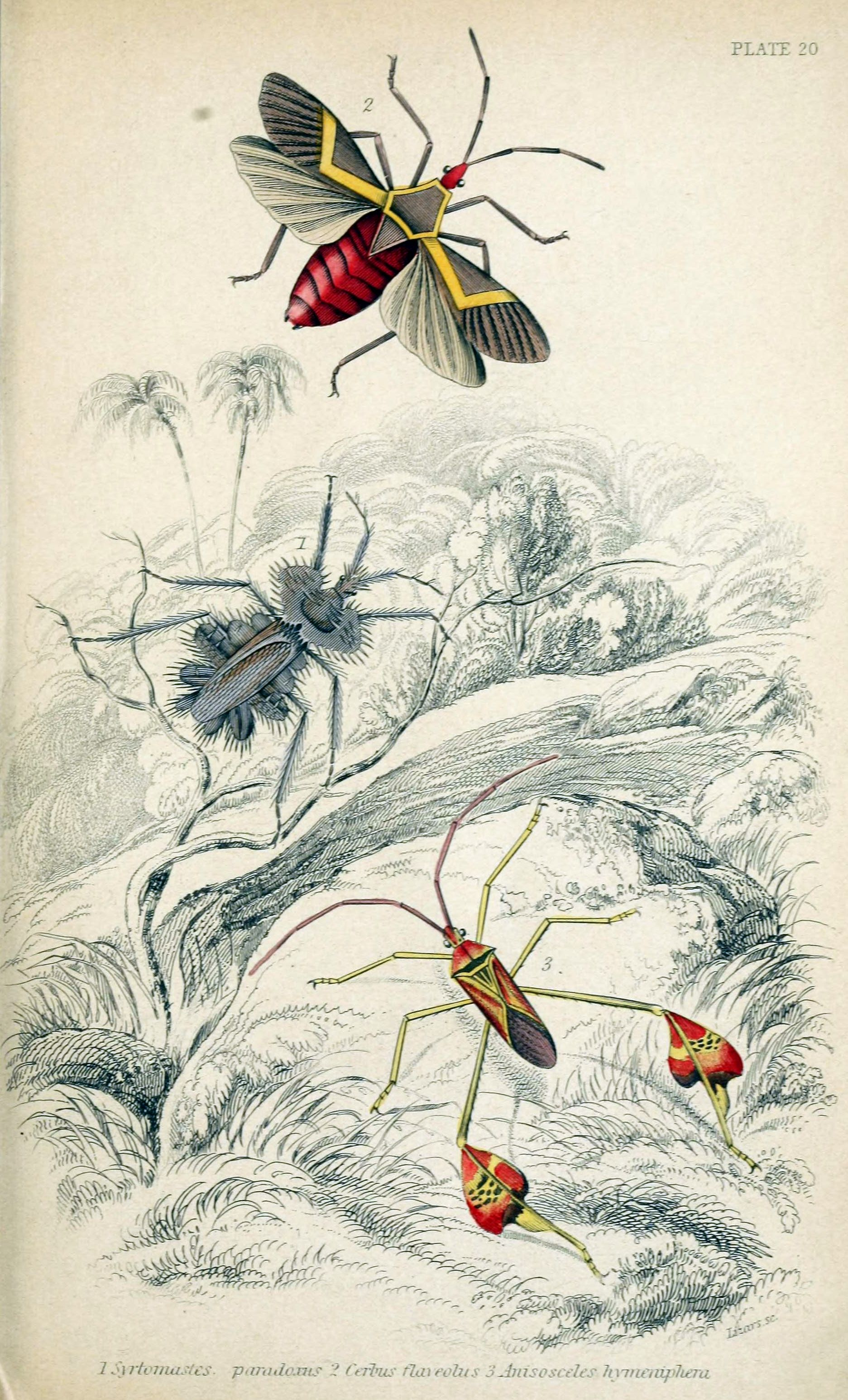
Anisosceles Hymeniphera (synonym of A. hymenipherus), bottom right, plate from Introduction to Entomology.

Bitta hymeniphera is a species of leaf-footed bug in the family Coreidae. It occurs in South America. It was first described by English entomologist John O. Westwood in 1840.
