= Aeolochroma melaleucae =

Scientific classification
- Kingdom: Animalia
- Phylum: Arthropoda
- Class: Insecta
- Order: Lepidoptera
- Family: Geometridae
- Genus: Aeolochroma
- Species: A. melaleucae

Binomial name
- Aeolochroma melaleucae (Goldfinch, 1929)

Synonyms
- Terpna melaleucae Goldfinch, 1929

Species of moth

Aeolochroma melaleucae is a moth of the family Geometridae first described by Gilbert M. Goldfinch in 1929. It is found in Queensland, Australia.
