= Aeolochroma olivia =

Scientific classification
- Kingdom: Animalia
- Phylum: Arthropoda
- Class: Insecta
- Order: Lepidoptera
- Family: Geometridae
- Genus: Aeolochroma
- Species: A. olivia

Binomial name
- Aeolochroma olivia (Goldfinch, 1943)

Synonyms
- Terpna olivia Goldfinch, 1943

Species of moth

Aeolochroma olivia is a moth of the family Geometridae first described by Gilbert M. Goldfinch in 1943. It is found in New South Wales, Australia.

The specific epithet olivia was given in honour of the wife of Gilbert M. Goldfinch, who described the species.
