= Aeolochroma venia =

Scientific classification
- Kingdom: Animalia
- Phylum: Arthropoda
- Clade: Pancrustacea
- Class: Insecta
- Order: Lepidoptera
- Family: Geometridae
- Genus: Aeolochroma
- Species: A. venia

Binomial name
- Aeolochroma venia L. B. Prout, 1924

Species of moth

Aeolochroma venia is a moth of the family Geometridae first described by Louis Beethoven Prout in 1924. It is found on New Guinea.
