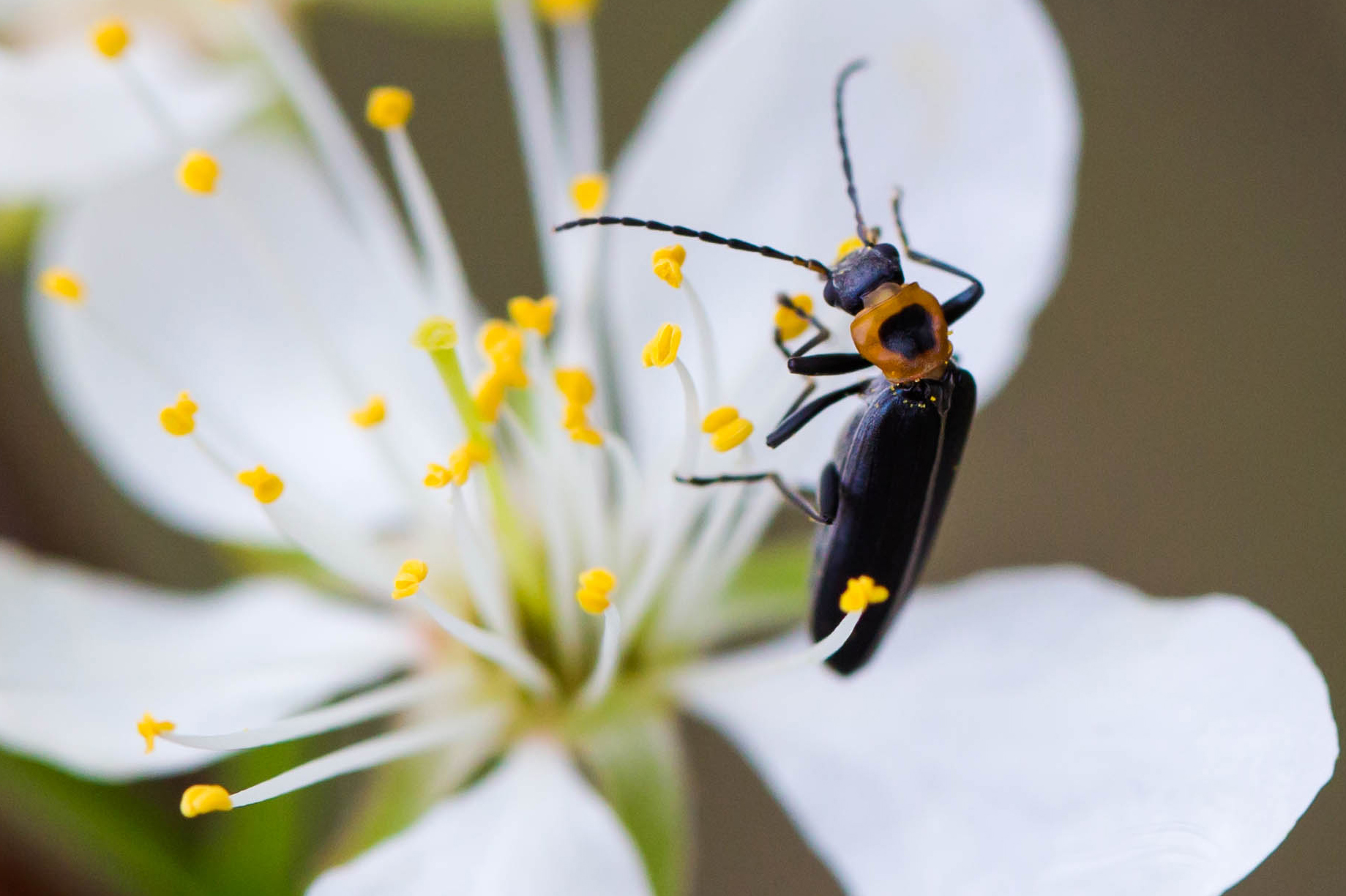
- Asclera puncticollis

Scientific classification
- Kingdom: Animalia
- Phylum: Arthropoda
- Class: Insecta
- Order: Coleoptera
- Suborder: Polyphaga
- Infraorder: Cucujiformia
- Family: Oedemeridae
- Tribe: Asclerini
- Genus: Asclera; Stephens, 1839

= Asclera =

Genus of beetles

Asclera is a genus of false blister beetles in the family Oedemeridae. There are about six described species in Asclera.

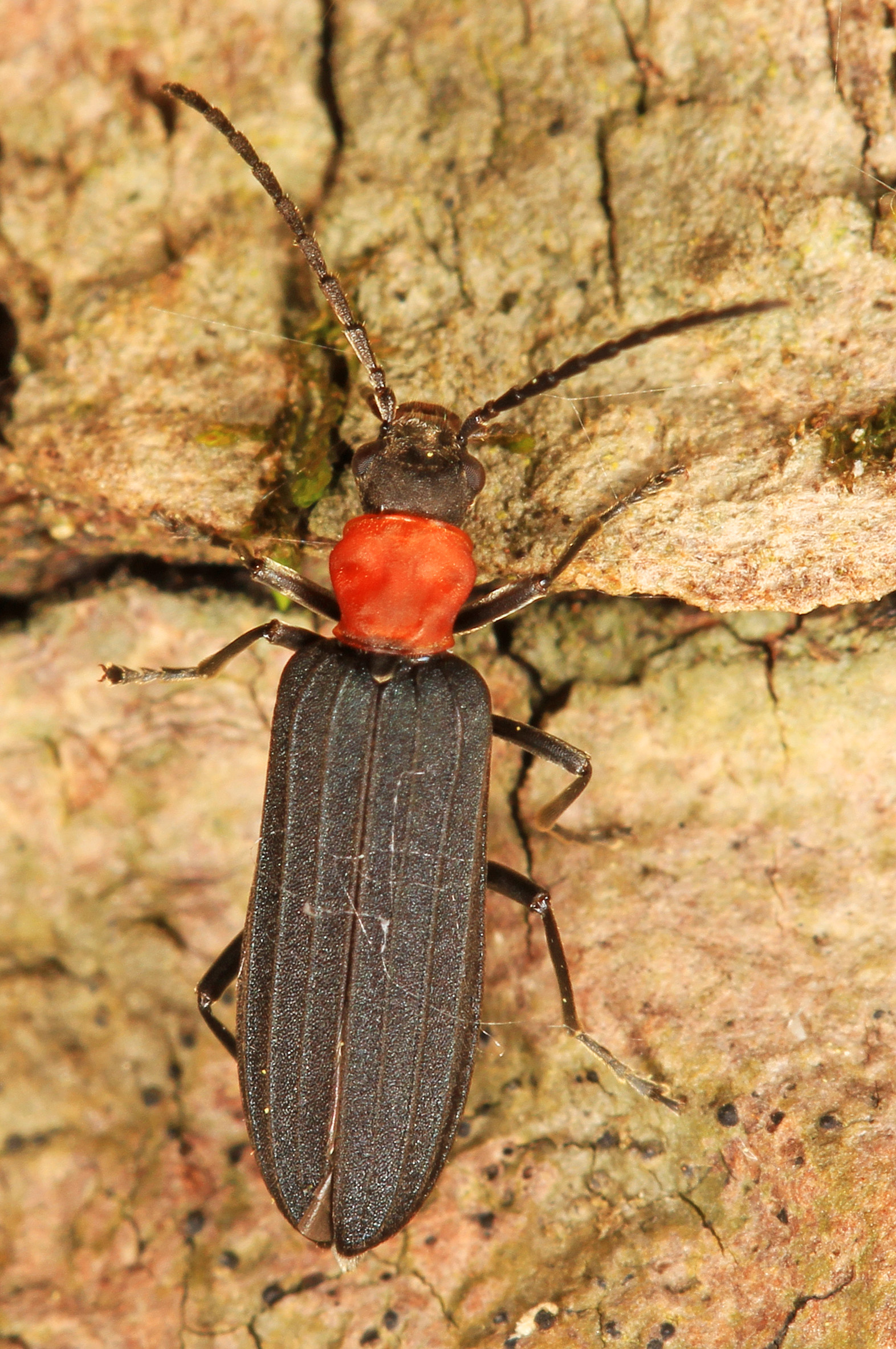
Asclera ruficollis

== Species ==
- Asclera auripilis Van Dyke, 1946
- Asclera discolor LeConte, 1874
- Asclera excavata LeConte, 1852
- Asclera nigra LeConte, 1852
- Asclera puncticollis (Say, 1823)
- Asclera ruficollis (Say, 1823) (red-necked false blister beetle)
