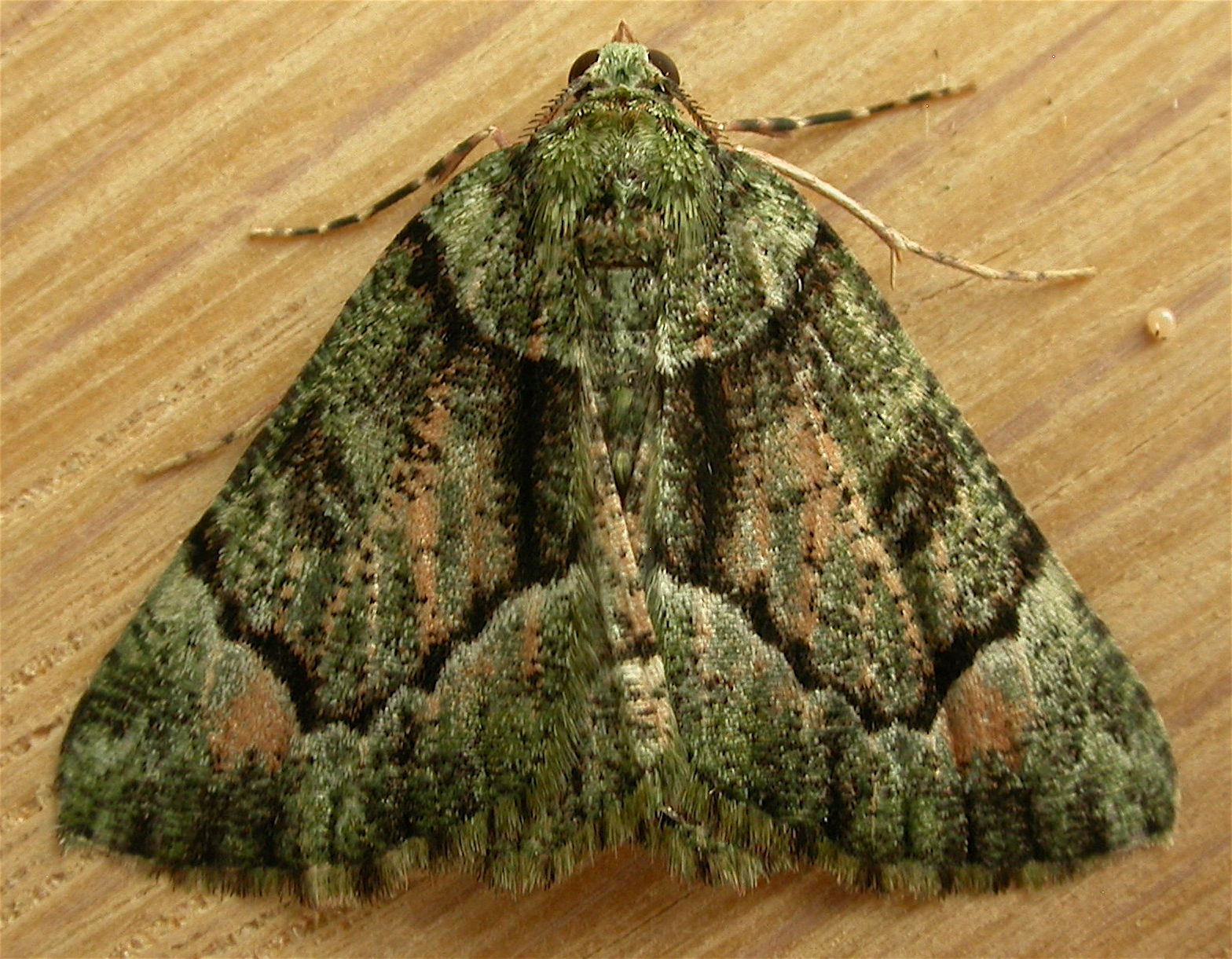

Scientific classification
- Kingdom: Animalia
- Phylum: Arthropoda
- Class: Insecta
- Order: Lepidoptera
- Family: Geometridae
- Genus: Aeolochroma
- Species: A. metarhodata

Binomial name
- Aeolochroma metarhodata (Walker, 1863)

Synonyms
- Scotosia metarhodata Walker, 1863

= Aeolochroma metarhodata =

Species of moth

Aeolochroma metarhodata, the tea-tree emerald, is a moth of the family Geometridae first described by Francis Walker in 1863. It is found in the Australian states of Queensland, New South Wales, and Victoria.

The larvae feed on Leptospermum polygalifolium.
