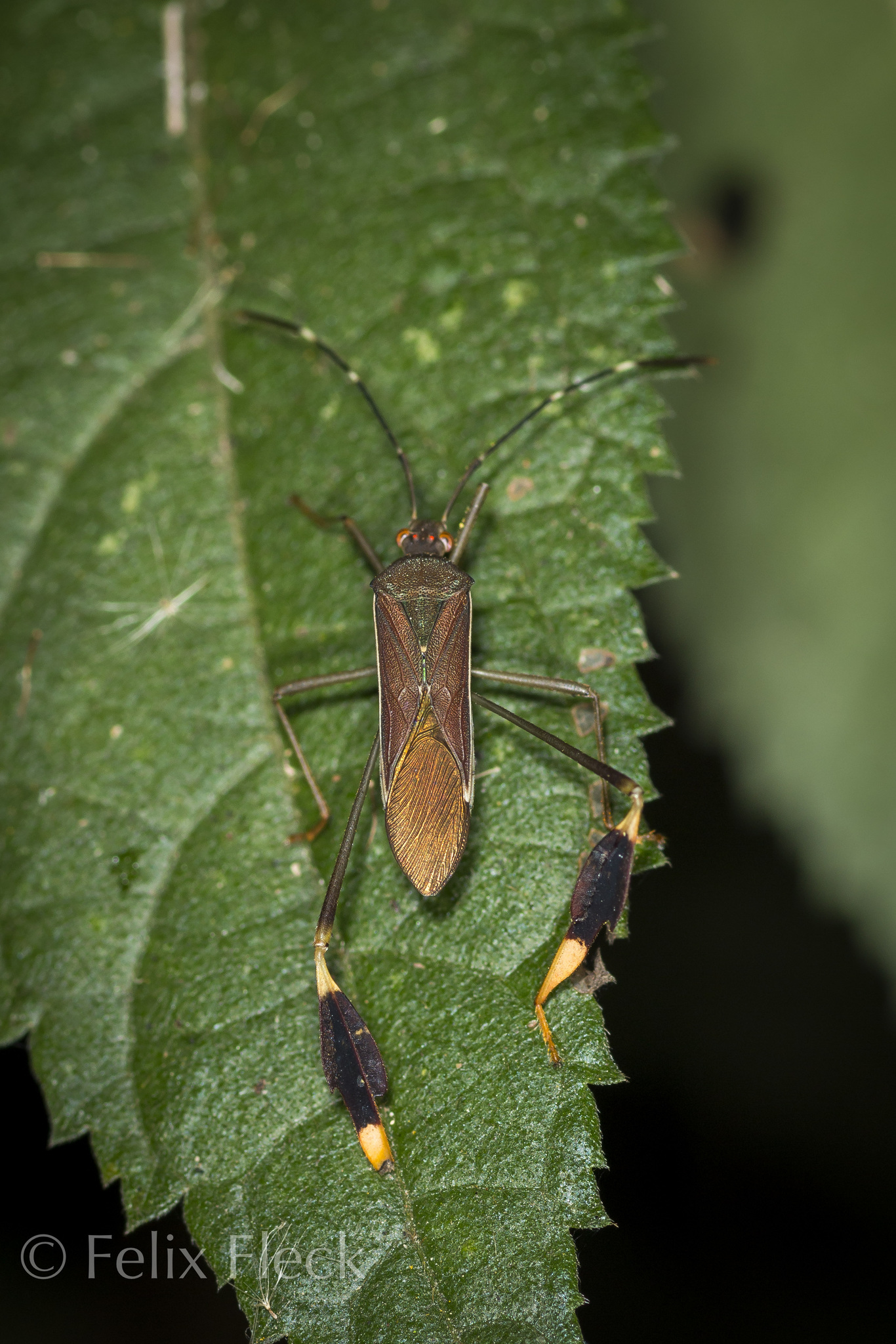

Scientific classification
- Kingdom: Animalia
- Phylum: Arthropoda
- Clade: Pancrustacea
- Class: Insecta
- Order: Hemiptera
- Suborder: Heteroptera
- Family: Coreidae
- Tribe: Anisoscelini
- Genus: Anisoscelis
- Species: A. discolor

Binomial name
- Anisoscelis discolor Stål, 1854

= Anisoscelis discolor =

Species of true bug

Anisoscelis discolor is a species of leaf-footed bug in the family Coreidae endemic to Ecuador. It was first described by Swedish entomologist Carl Stål in 1854. Stål originally described the species as coming from "Taiti" (sic). However, Brailovsky (2016) notes that the Anisoscelis genus has an exclusive Neotropical distribution and the original data must have been the result of a mistaken label.
