= Aeolochroma purpurissa =

Scientific classification
- Kingdom: Animalia
- Phylum: Arthropoda
- Class: Insecta
- Order: Lepidoptera
- Family: Geometridae
- Genus: Aeolochroma
- Species: A. purpurissa

Binomial name
- Aeolochroma purpurissa (Warren, 1906)

Synonyms
- Hypochroma purpurissa Warren, 1906

Species of moth

Aeolochroma purpurissa is a moth of the family Geometridae first described by William Warren in 1906. It is found on New Guinea.
