= Asclera excavata =

Scientific classification
- Domain: Eukaryota
- Kingdom: Animalia
- Phylum: Arthropoda
- Class: Insecta
- Order: Coleoptera
- Suborder: Polyphaga
- Infraorder: Cucujiformia
- Family: Oedemeridae
- Tribe: Asclerini
- Genus: Asclera
- Species: A. excavata

Binomial name
- Asclera excavata LeConte, 1852

Species of beetle

Asclera excavata is a species of false blister beetle in the family Oedemeridae. It is found in North America.
