= Aeolochroma viridimedia =

Scientific classification
- Kingdom: Animalia
- Phylum: Arthropoda
- Clade: Pancrustacea
- Class: Insecta
- Order: Lepidoptera
- Family: Geometridae
- Genus: Aeolochroma
- Species: A. viridimedia

Binomial name
- Aeolochroma viridimedia L. B. Prout, 1916

Species of moth

Aeolochroma viridimedia is a moth of the family Geometridae first described by Louis Beethoven in 1916. It is found on New Guinea and on Buru.

== Subspecies ==
- Aeolochroma viridimedia viridimedia (New Guinea)
- Aeolochroma viridimedia recta Prout, 1929 (Buru)
