= Artemisia discolor =

Artemisia discolor may refer to two different species of plants:

- Artemisia discolor Torr. & A.Gray, a taxonomic synonym for ragweed sagebrush (Artemisia franserioides)
- Artemisia discolor Douglas ex DC., a taxonomic synonym for silver wormwood (Artemisia ludoviciana)
