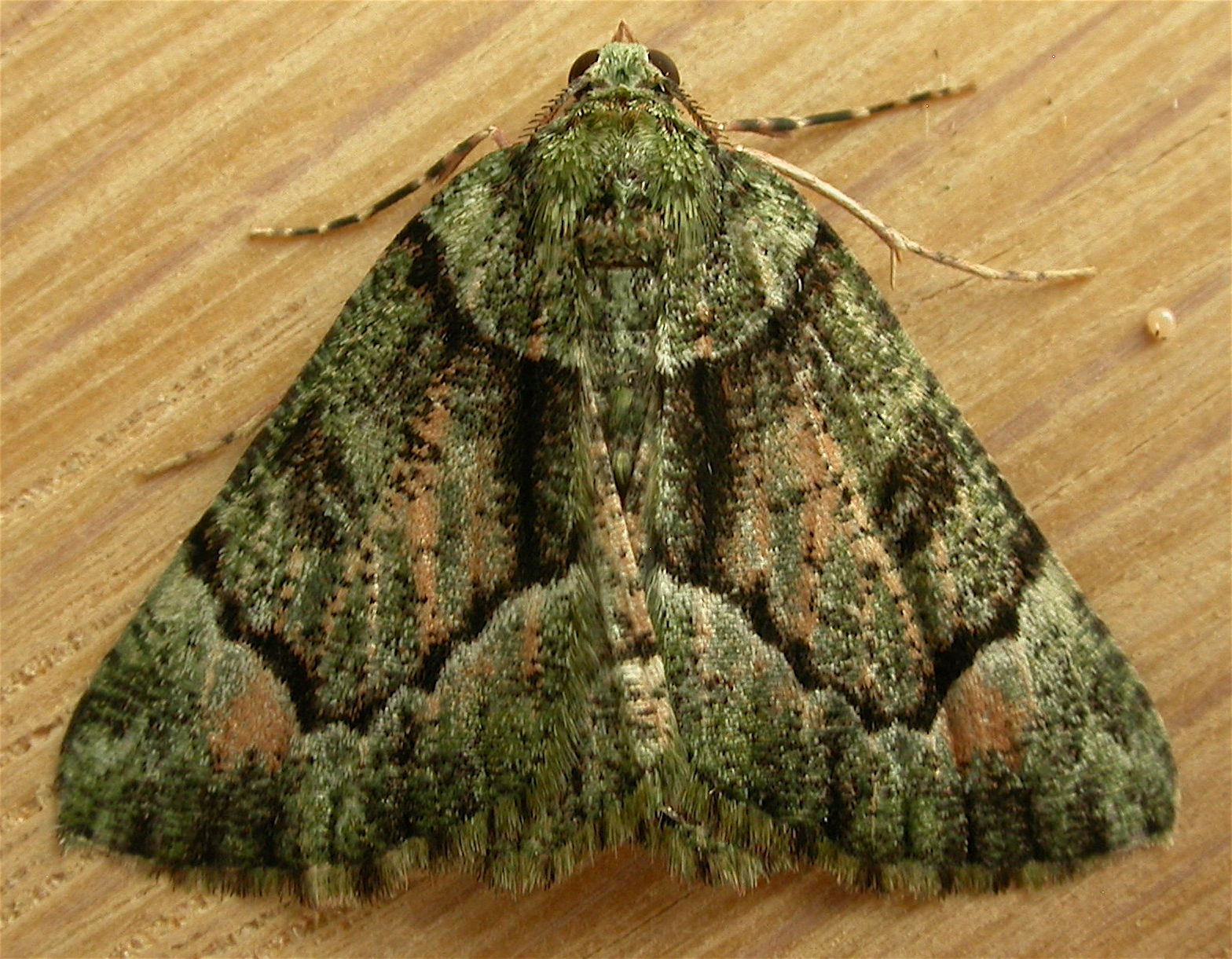

Scientific classification
- Kingdom: Animalia
- Phylum: Arthropoda
- Clade: Pancrustacea
- Class: Insecta
- Order: Lepidoptera
- Family: Geometridae
- Tribe: Pseudoterpnini
- Genus: Aeolochroma; Prout, 1912

= Aeolochroma =

Genus of geometer moths

Aeolochroma is a genus of moths in the family Geometridae described by Prout in 1912.

== Species ==
- Species group 1
  - Aeolochroma albifusaria (Walker, 1866)
    - Aeolochroma albifusaria albifusaria (Walker, 1866) (=Actenochroma discolor Warren, 1896)
    - Aeolochroma albifusaria suffusa Prout, 1927
  - Aeolochroma bakeri Prout, 1913
  - Aeolochroma intima Prout, 1913
  - Aeolochroma languida (Warren, 1898) (=Hypochroma rufivaria Warren, 1907)
  - Aeolochroma modesta (Warren, 1903)
  - Aeolochroma prasina (Warren, 1896)
    - Aeolochroma prasina prasina (Warren, 1896)
    - Aeolochroma prasina angustifascia Prout, 1916
    - Aeolochroma prasina defasciata Prout, 1916
    - Aeolochroma prasina louisa Prout, 1927
    - Aeolochroma prasina spadiocampa Prout, 1917
  - Aeolochroma saturataria (Walker, 1866) (=Actenochroma caesia Warren, 1896, Hypochroma perfulvata Warren, 1899)
  - Aeolochroma turneri (Lucas, 1890)
  - Aeolochroma venia Prout, 1924
  - Aeolochroma viridimedia Prout, 1916
    - Aeolochroma viridimedia viridimedia Prout, 1916
    - Aeolochroma viridimedia recta Prout, 1929
- Other species
  - Aeolochroma acanthina (Meyrick, 1888)
  - Aeolochroma amethystina (Warren, 1907)
  - Aeolochroma chioneschatia Prout, 1924
  - Aeolochroma hypochromaria (Guenée, [1858])
    - Aeolochroma hypochromaria hypochromaria (Guenée, [1858]) (=Pseudoterpna bryophanes Turner, 1904)
    - Aeolochroma hypochromaria caledonica Holloway, 1979
  - Aeolochroma melaleucae (Goldfinch, 1929)
  - Aeolochroma metarhodata (Walker, [1863])
  - Aeolochroma mniaria (Goldfinch, 1929)
  - Aeolochroma olivia (Goldfinch, 1943)
  - Aeolochroma pammiges (Turner, 1941)
  - Aeolochroma purpurissa (Warren, 1906)
  - Aeolochroma quadrilinea (Lucas, 1892) (=Actenochroma ochrea (Warren, 1896))
  - Aeolochroma rhodochlora (Goldfinch, 1929)
  - Aeolochroma subrubella (Warren, 1903)
  - Aeolochroma subrubescens (Warren, 1896)
  - Aeolochroma unitaria (Walker, 1860)
  - Aeolochroma viridicata (Lucas, 1890)
