= Aeolochroma turneri =

Scientific classification
- Kingdom: Animalia
- Phylum: Arthropoda
- Class: Insecta
- Order: Lepidoptera
- Family: Geometridae
- Genus: Aeolochroma
- Species: A. turneri

Binomial name
- Aeolochroma turneri (T. P. Lucas, 1890)

Synonyms
- Hypochroma turneri T. P. Lucas, 1890

Species of moth

Aeolochroma turneri is a moth of the family Geometridae first described by Thomas Pennington Lucas in 1890. It is found in Australia's Northern Territory and Queensland.

The wingspan is about 30 mm.
