= Aeolochroma languida =

Scientific classification
- Kingdom: Animalia
- Phylum: Arthropoda
- Class: Insecta
- Order: Lepidoptera
- Family: Geometridae
- Genus: Aeolochroma
- Species: A. languida

Binomial name
- Aeolochroma languida (Warren, 1898)

Synonyms
- Actenochroma languida Warren, 1898; Hypochroma rufivaria Warren, 1907

Species of moth

Aeolochroma languida is a moth of the family Geometridae first described by William Warren in 1898. It is found on New Guinea.
