= Aeolochroma subrubescens =

Scientific classification
- Kingdom: Animalia
- Phylum: Arthropoda
- Class: Insecta
- Order: Lepidoptera
- Family: Geometridae
- Genus: Aeolochroma
- Species: A. subrubescens

Binomial name
- Aeolochroma subrubescens (Warren, 1896)

Synonyms
- Hypochroma subrubescens Warren, 1896

Species of moth

Aeolochroma subrubescens is a moth of the family Geometridae first described by William Warren in 1896. It is found in Queensland, Australia.
