= Aeolochroma mniaria =

Scientific classification
- Kingdom: Animalia
- Phylum: Arthropoda
- Class: Insecta
- Order: Lepidoptera
- Family: Geometridae
- Genus: Aeolochroma
- Species: A. mniaria

Binomial name
- Aeolochroma mniaria (Goldfinch, 1929)

Synonyms
- Scotosia mniaria Goldfinch, 1929

Moth species found in Australia

Aeolochroma mniaria is a moth of the family Geometridae first described by Gilbert M. Goldfinch in 1929. It is found in New South Wales, Australia.

The wingspan is 40 mm.
