= Aeolochroma acanthina =

Scientific classification
- Kingdom: Animalia
- Phylum: Arthropoda
- Clade: Pancrustacea
- Class: Insecta
- Order: Lepidoptera
- Family: Geometridae
- Genus: Aeolochroma
- Species: A. acanthina

Binomial name
- Aeolochroma acanthina (Meyrick, 1888)

Synonyms
- Hypochroma acanthina Meyrick, 1888

Species of moth

Aeolochroma acanthina is a moth of the family Geometridae first described by Edward Meyrick in 1888. It is found in Australia.
