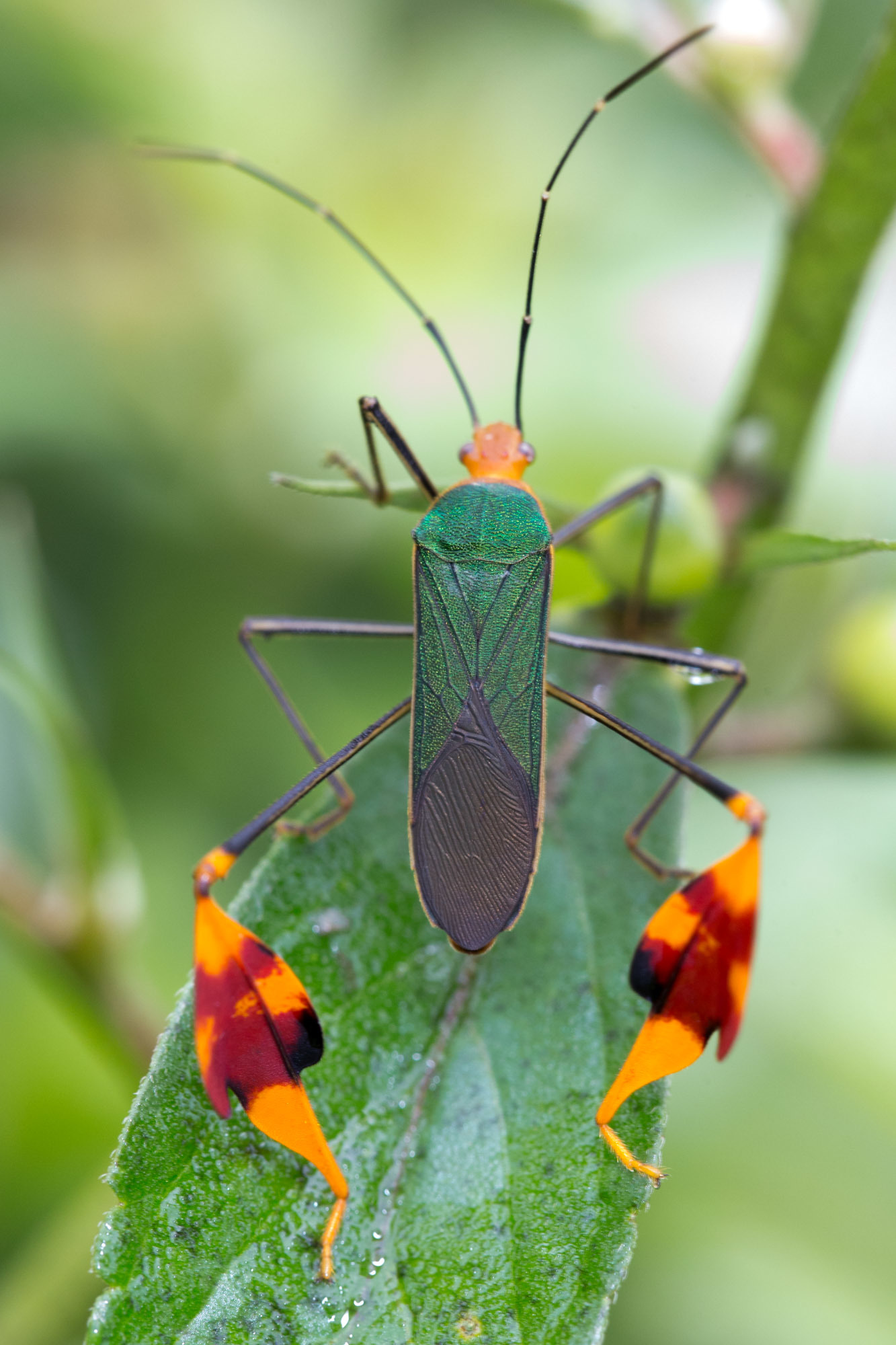

Scientific classification
- Domain: Eukaryota
- Kingdom: Animalia
- Phylum: Arthropoda
- Class: Insecta
- Order: Hemiptera
- Suborder: Heteroptera
- Family: Coreidae
- Tribe: Anisoscelini
- Genus: Anisoscelis
- Species: A. foliaceus

Binomial name
- Anisoscelis foliaceus Fabricius, 1803

= Anisoscelis foliaceus =

Species of true bug

Anisoscelis foliaceus is a species of leaf-footed bug in the family Coreidae. It occurs in South America. It was first described by Danish zoologist Johan Christian Fabricius in 1803.
