= Aeolochroma pammiges =

Scientific classification
- Kingdom: Animalia
- Phylum: Arthropoda
- Class: Insecta
- Order: Lepidoptera
- Family: Geometridae
- Genus: Aeolochroma
- Species: A. pammiges

Binomial name
- Aeolochroma pammiges (Turner, 1941)

Synonyms
- Terpna pammiges Turner, 1941

Species of moth

Aeolochroma pammiges is a moth of the family Geometridae first described by Alfred Jefferis Turner in 1941. It is found in Queensland, Australia.
