= Aeolochroma viridicata =

Scientific classification
- Kingdom: Animalia
- Phylum: Arthropoda
- Class: Insecta
- Order: Lepidoptera
- Family: Geometridae
- Genus: Aeolochroma
- Species: A. viridicata

Binomial name
- Aeolochroma viridicata (T. P. Lucas, 1890)

Synonyms
- Hypochroma viridicata T. P. Lucas, 1890

Species of moth

Aeolochroma viridicata is a moth of the family Geometridae first described by Thomas Pennington Lucas in 1890. It is found in Australian states of New South Wales and Queensland. Adultsts have a complex green and brown or grey pattern.
