= Aeolochroma quadrilinea =

Scientific classification
- Kingdom: Animalia
- Phylum: Arthropoda
- Class: Insecta
- Order: Lepidoptera
- Family: Geometridae
- Genus: Aeolochroma
- Species: A. quadrilinea

Binomial name
- Aeolochroma quadrilinea (T. P. Lucas, 1892)

Synonyms
- Hypochroma quadrilinea T. P. Lucas, 1892; Actenochroma ochrea Warren, 1896

Species of moth

Aeolochroma quadrilinea is a moth of the family Geometridae first described by Thomas Pennington Lucas in 1892. It is found in Queensland, Australia.
