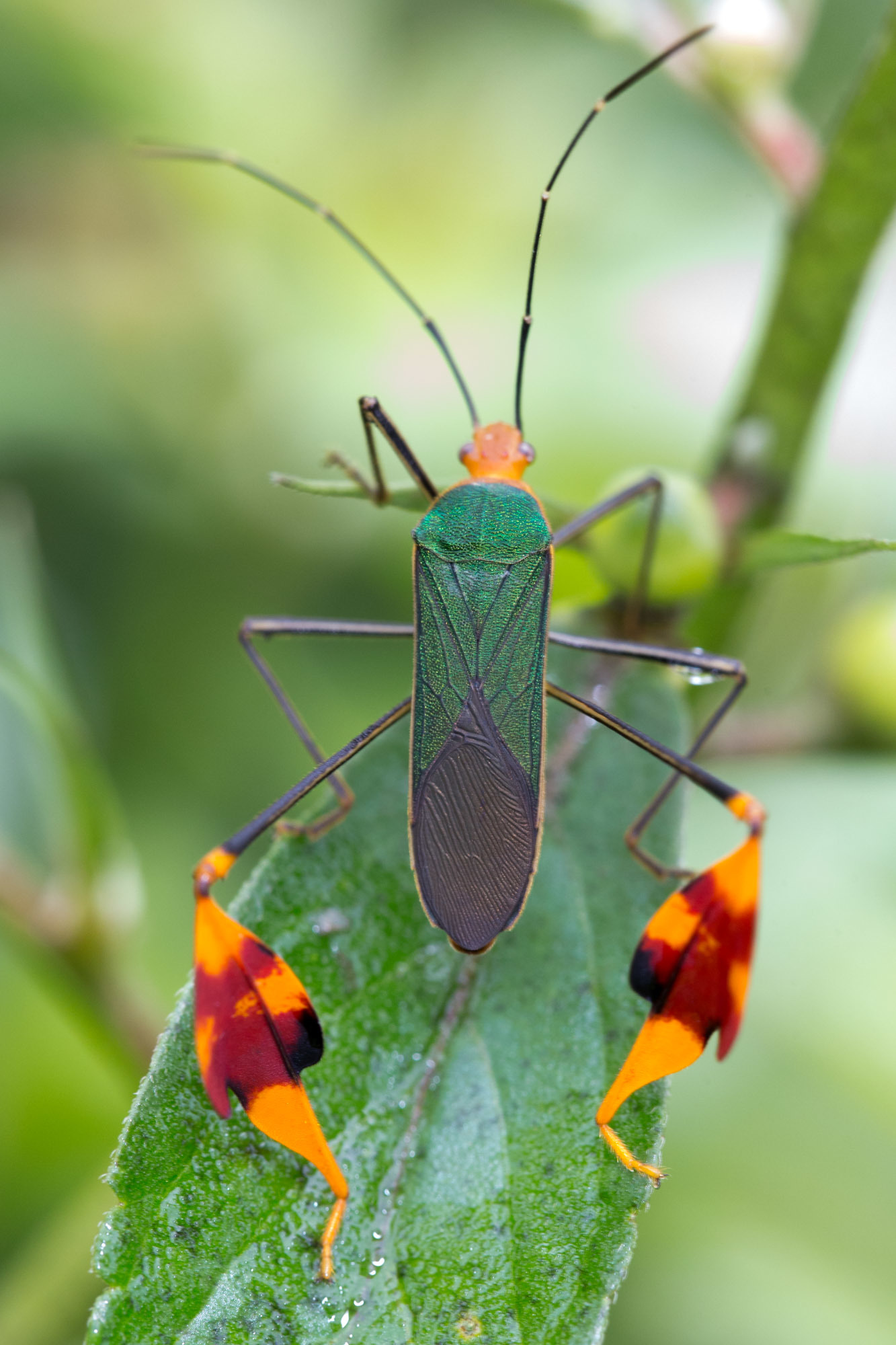
- Anisoscelis foliaceus

Scientific classification
- Kingdom: Animalia
- Phylum: Arthropoda
- Class: Insecta
- Order: Hemiptera
- Suborder: Heteroptera
- Family: Coreidae
- Subfamily: Coreinae
- Tribe: Anisoscelini
- Genus: Anisoscelis; Latreille, 1829

Synonyms
- Bitta Osuna, 1985

= Anisoscelis =

Genus of insects

Anisoscelis is a genus of leaf-footed bugs in the family Coreidae. The genus Anisoscelis formerly includes some species that are now separated into the genus Bitta. In the genus Bitta, the leaf like broadening on the hind leg does not reach the distal tip of the tibia. Bitta affinis has sometimes been called as the flag-footed bug, and Bitta alipes has been called the matador bug, although the name could apply to many others. Several species slowly move their hind legs alternating from left to right and it is believed that this helps them evade potential predators, since they perform the actions when faced with potential predators rather than with conspecifics.

== Species ==
The following species are included in the genus Anisoscelis:

Species	Image
Anisoscelis caeruleipennis Guérin-Méneville, 1838	
Anisoscelis discolor Stål, 1854	
Anisoscelis foliaceus Fabricius, 1803	
Anisoscelis marginellus Dallas, 1852	
Anisoscelis scutellaris Stål, 1870	

Nota bene: The species (affinis, alipes, gradadius, hymenipherus, luridus, and podalicus) were treated as a subgenus or genus Bitta while one species (caeruleipennis) is a disputed member of the Anisoscelis genus.

Species	Image
Bitta affinis (Westwood, 1840)	
Bitta alipes (Guérin-Méneville, 1833)	
Bitta podalica (Brailovsky & Mayorga, 1995)	
Bitta lurida (Brailovsky, 2016)	
Bitta hymeniphera (Westwood, 1840)	
Bitta gradadius (Distant, 1881)	
