= Aeolochroma unitaria =

Scientific classification
- Kingdom: Animalia
- Phylum: Arthropoda
- Class: Insecta
- Order: Lepidoptera
- Family: Geometridae
- Genus: Aeolochroma
- Species: A. unitaria

Binomial name
- Aeolochroma unitaria (Walker, 1860)

Synonyms
- Tephrosia unitaria Walker, 1860

Species of moth

Aeolochroma unitaria is a moth of the family Geometridae first described by Francis Walker in 1860. It is found in Tasmania, Australia.
