= Aeolochroma prasina =

Scientific classification
- Kingdom: Animalia
- Phylum: Arthropoda
- Class: Insecta
- Order: Lepidoptera
- Family: Geometridae
- Genus: Aeolochroma
- Species: A. prasina

Binomial name
- Aeolochroma prasina (Warren, 1896)

Synonyms
- Actenochroma prasina Warren, 1896

Species of moth

Aeolochroma prasina is a moth of the family Geometridae first described by William Warren in 1896. It is found on New Guinea and Seram.

== Subspecies ==
- Aeolochroma prasina prasina (Fergusson Island)
- Aeolochroma prasina angustifascia Prout, 1916 (Dampier Island)
- Aeolochroma prasina defasciata Prout, 1916 (New Britain)
- Aeolochroma prasina louisa Prout, 1927 (St. Aignan Island)
- Aeolochroma prasina spadiocampa Prout, 1917 (Biak)
