= Aeolochroma subrubella =

Scientific classification
- Kingdom: Animalia
- Phylum: Arthropoda
- Class: Insecta
- Order: Lepidoptera
- Family: Geometridae
- Genus: Aeolochroma
- Species: A. subrubella

Binomial name
- Aeolochroma subrubella (Warren, 1903)

Synonyms
- Hypochroma subrubella Warren, 1903

Species of moth

Aeolochroma subrubella is a moth of the family Geometridae first described by William Warren in 1903. It is found on New Guinea.
