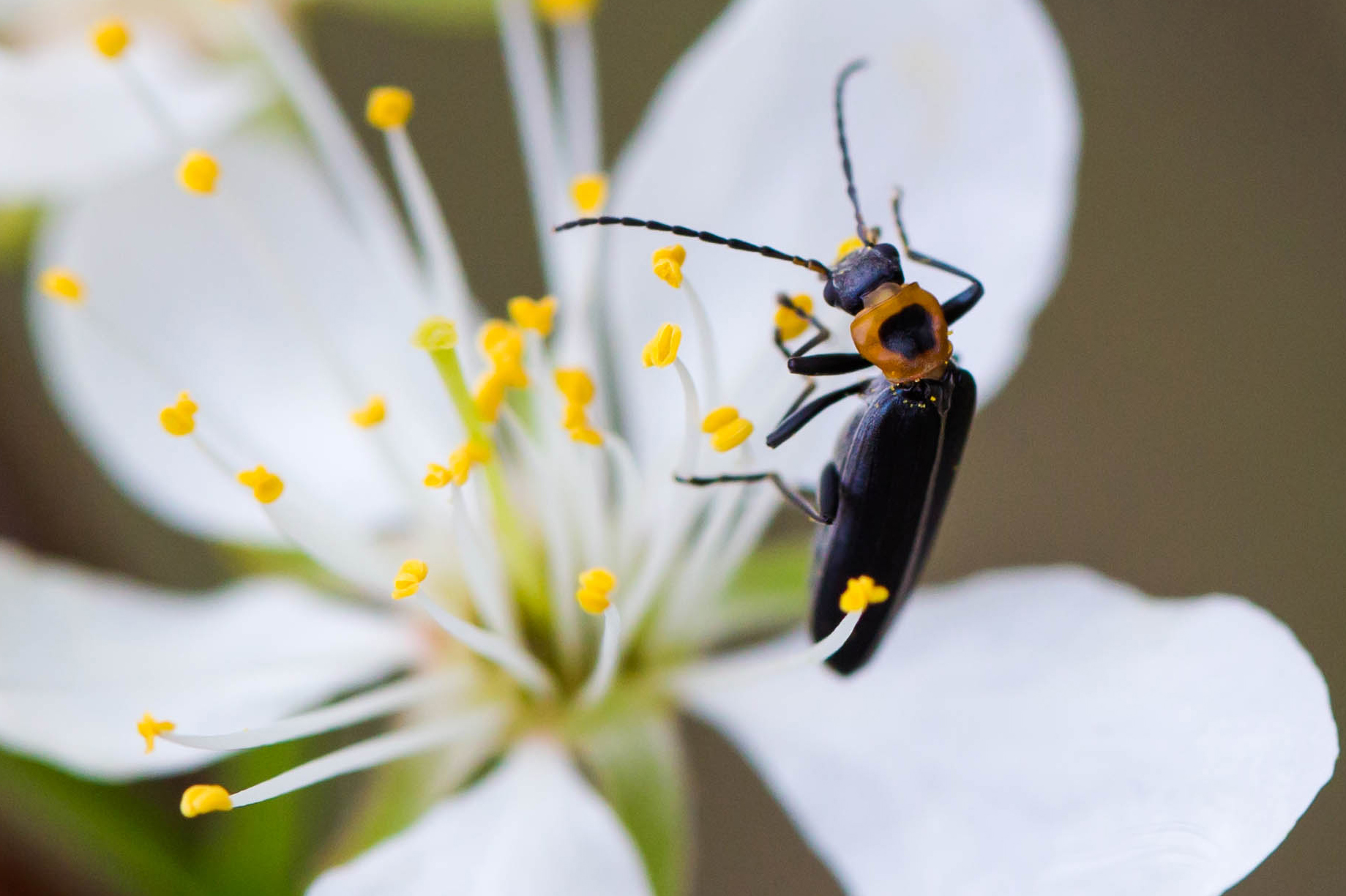

Scientific classification
- Domain: Eukaryota
- Kingdom: Animalia
- Phylum: Arthropoda
- Class: Insecta
- Order: Coleoptera
- Suborder: Polyphaga
- Infraorder: Cucujiformia
- Family: Oedemeridae
- Genus: Asclera
- Species: A. puncticollis

Binomial name
- Asclera puncticollis (Say, 1823)

= Asclera puncticollis =

Species of beetle

Asclera puncticollis is a species of false blister beetle in the family Oedemeridae. It is found in North America.
