= Aeolochroma bakeri =

Scientific classification
- Kingdom: Animalia
- Phylum: Arthropoda
- Class: Insecta
- Order: Lepidoptera
- Family: Geometridae
- Genus: Aeolochroma
- Species: A. bakeri

Binomial name
- Aeolochroma bakeri L. B. Prout, 1913

Species of moth

Aeolochroma bakeri is a moth of the family Geometridae first described by Louis Beethoven Prout in 1913. It is found on New Guinea.
