= Aeolochroma modesta =

Scientific classification
- Kingdom: Animalia
- Phylum: Arthropoda
- Class: Insecta
- Order: Lepidoptera
- Family: Geometridae
- Genus: Aeolochroma
- Species: A. modesta

Binomial name
- Aeolochroma modesta (Warren, 1903)

Synonyms
- Hypochroma modesta Warren, 1903

Species of moth

Aeolochroma modesta is a moth of the family Geometridae first described by William Warren in 1903. It is found on New Guinea.
