= Aeolochroma hypochromaria =

Scientific classification
- Kingdom: Animalia
- Phylum: Arthropoda
- Class: Insecta
- Order: Lepidoptera
- Family: Geometridae
- Genus: Aeolochroma
- Species: A. hypochromaria

Binomial name
- Aeolochroma hypochromaria (Guenée, [1858])

Synonyms
- Cleora hypochromaria Guenée, [1858]; Pseudoterpna bryophanes Turner, 1904

Species of moth

Aeolochroma hypochromaria is a moth of the family Geometridae first described by Achille Guenée in 1858. It is found in Australia (New South Wales and Queensland) and New Caledonia.

Adults have a complex brown and dark green pattern.

== Subspecies ==
- Aeolochroma hypochromaria hypochromaria (Australia)
- Aeolochroma hypochromaria caledonica Holloway, 1979 (New Caledonia)
