= Aeolochroma amethystina =

Scientific classification
- Kingdom: Animalia
- Phylum: Arthropoda
- Class: Insecta
- Order: Lepidoptera
- Family: Geometridae
- Genus: Aeolochroma
- Species: A. amethystina

Binomial name
- Aeolochroma amethystina (Warren, 1907)

Synonyms
- Actenochroma amethystina Warren, 1907

Species of moth

Aeolochroma amethystina is a moth of the family Geometridae first described by William Warren in 1907. It is found on New Guinea.
