= Aeolochroma saturataria =

Scientific classification
- Kingdom: Animalia
- Phylum: Arthropoda
- Class: Insecta
- Order: Lepidoptera
- Family: Geometridae
- Genus: Aeolochroma
- Species: A. saturataria

Binomial name
- Aeolochroma saturataria (Walker, 1866)

Synonyms
- Hypochroma saturataria Walker, 1866; Actenochroma caesia Warren, 1896; Hypochroma perfulvata Warren, 1899

Species of moth

Aeolochroma saturataria is a moth of the family Geometridae first described by Francis Walker in 1866. It is found in Australia.
