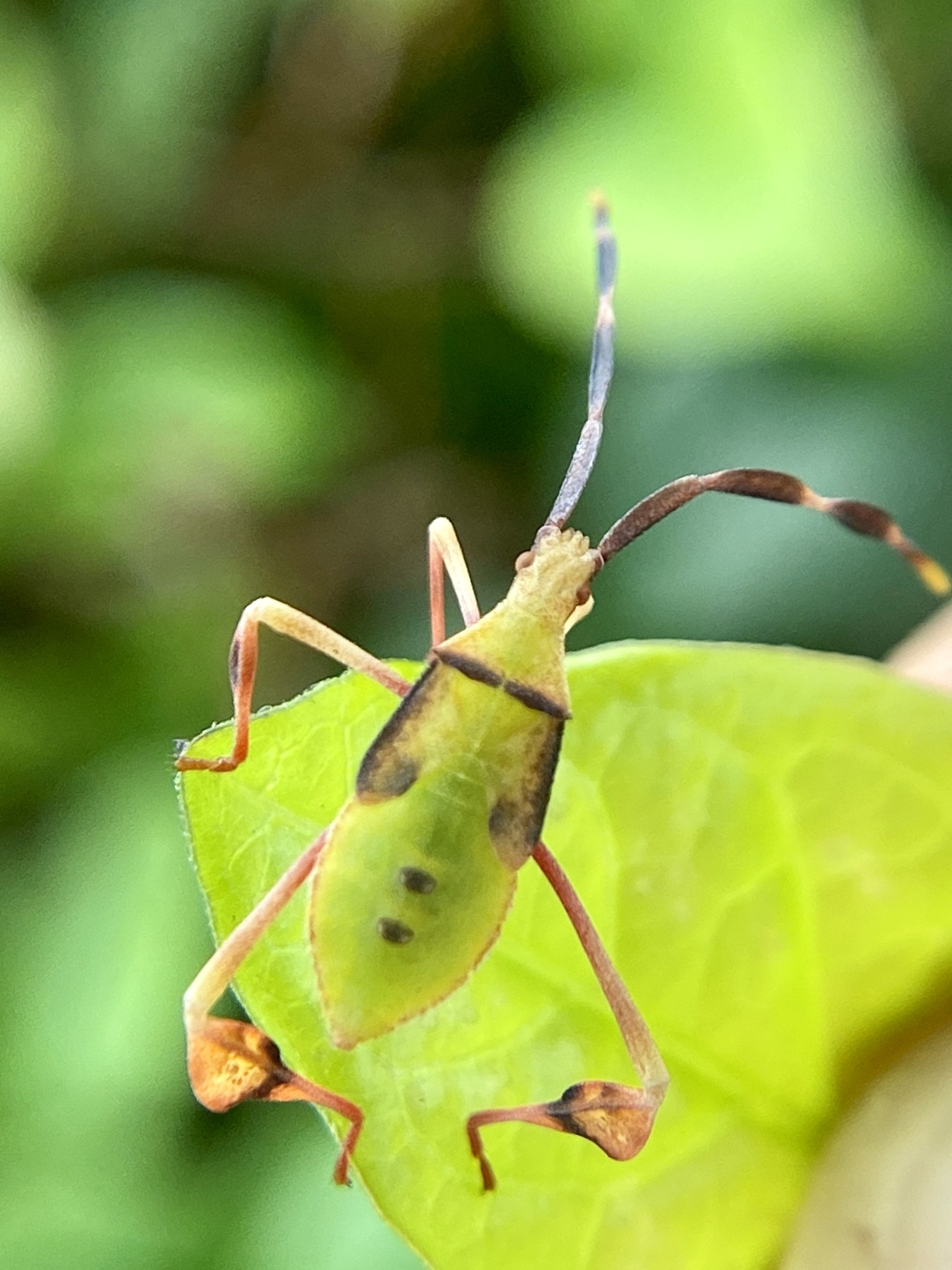

Scientific classification
- Kingdom: Animalia
- Phylum: Arthropoda
- Class: Insecta
- Order: Hemiptera
- Suborder: Heteroptera
- Family: Coreidae
- Genus: Chondrocera
- Species: C. laticornis

Binomial name
- Chondrocera laticornis Laporte, 1832

Synonyms
- Petalotoma unicolor Geiurin, 1857

= Chondrocera laticornis =

Species of true bug

Chondrocera laticornis is a species of leaf-footed bugs in the family Coreidae. They can be found along the east coast of South Florida. They are characterized by the flattened leaf like tibia of its legs, the dilated and segmented 2 and 3 antennal segments.
