= Abacetus discolor =

Scientific classification
- Domain: Eukaryota
- Kingdom: Animalia
- Phylum: Arthropoda
- Class: Insecta
- Order: Coleoptera
- Suborder: Adephaga
- Family: Carabidae
- Genus: Abacetus
- Species: A. discolor

Binomial name
- Abacetus discolor (Roth, 1851)

Species of beetle

Abacetus discolor is a species of ground beetle in the subfamily Pterostichinae. It was described by Roth in 1851.
