= Antaeotricha discolor =

Scientific classification
- Domain: Eukaryota
- Kingdom: Animalia
- Phylum: Arthropoda
- Class: Insecta
- Order: Lepidoptera
- Family: Depressariidae
- Genus: Antaeotricha
- Species: A. discolor

Binomial name
- Antaeotricha discolor (Walsingham, 1912)

Synonyms
- Stenoma discolor Walsingham, 1912

Species of moth

Antaeotricha discolor is a moth in the family Depressariidae. It was described by Lord Walsingham in 1912. It is found in Mexico (Guerrero) and Guatemala.

The wingspan is 25–32 mm. The forewings are shining silvery white, with a long dark yellowish brown dorsal patch, sparsely sprinkled with white scales, occupying the whole space beneath the fold, and slightly overlapping the fold before and beyond its middle. A reduplicated yellowish spot, at the end of the cell is followed by a short pale greyish fuscous shade, a double curved row of pale greyish fuscous spots precedes the apex and termen, converging in a shade of the same colour about the tornus, but not reaching the costa. The hindwings are very pale brownish grey, the costa and apex broadly white.
