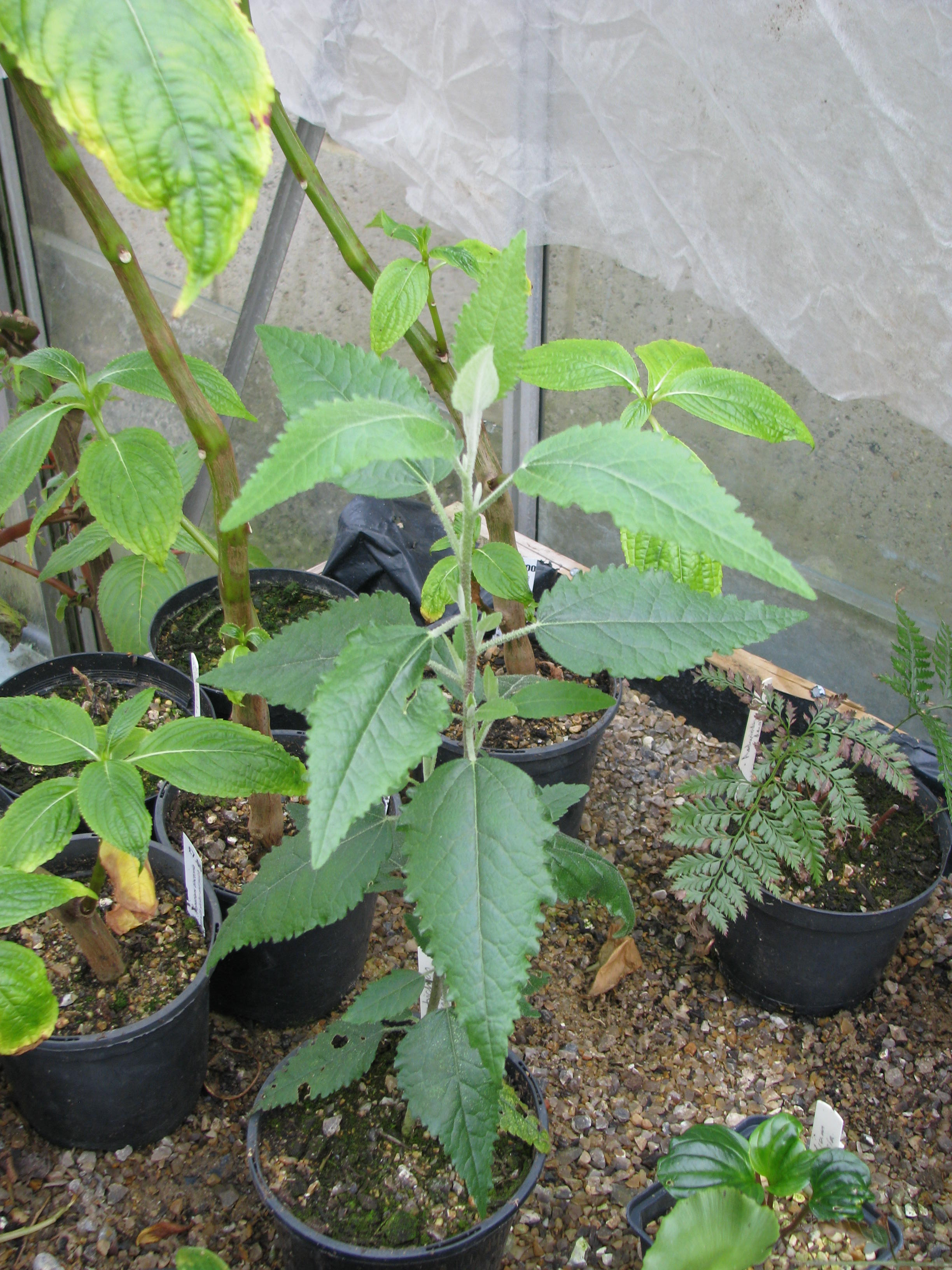

Scientific classification
- Kingdom: Plantae
- Clade: Tracheophytes
- Clade: Angiosperms
- Clade: Eudicots
- Clade: Rosids
- Order: Malvales
- Family: Malvaceae
- Genus: Asterotrichion; Klotzsch (1841)
- Species: A. discolor

Binomial name
- Asterotrichion discolor (Hook.) Melville (1966)

Synonyms
- Asterotrichion sidoides Klotzsch (1841); Blepharanthemum sidoides (Hook.) Klotzsch (1841); Napaea discolor (Hook.) Alef. (1867); Plagianthus dampieri Anon. (1884), nom. nud.; Plagianthus discolor Asch. (1862); Plagianthus lampenii Booth ex Lindl. (1838); Plagianthus petiolaris Backh. ex Benth. (1862), nom. nud.; Plagianthus sidoides Hook. (1835); Sida discolor Hook. (1834)

= Asterotrichion =

Genus of flowering plants

Asterotrichion discolor, known commonly as the Tasmanian Currajong, is a species of flowering plant which is part of the family Malvaceae. It is endemic to Tasmania, where it is largely limited to damp Eucalyptus gullies in sclerophyll forest in the south-east of the state. It is the sole species in genus Asterotrichion.

== Description ==
Plants of this species grow as tree to a height of 14 metres. The species has a perennial life cycle and is alternately described as hermaphroditic, monoecious and dioecious. The leaves are variable in size, alternately arranged and the margins bluntly serrated. The upper surface of the leaves are dull green with greatly divided veins and the lower surface is covered densely with star-shaped hairs. The flowers, which typically bloom from mid or late autumn to winter, are small and aromatic with 5 white petals. The species features dry or fleshy, indehiscent and drupaceous fruit.
