= Acrobotrys =

- Illustration accompanying the protologue of genus and species name.

Scientific classification
- Kingdom: Plantae
- Clade: Tracheophytes
- Clade: Angiosperms
- Clade: Eudicots
- Clade: Asterids
- Order: Gentianales
- Family: Rubiaceae
- Genus: Acrobotrys; K.Schum. & K.Krause
- Species: A. discolor

Binomial name
- Acrobotrys discolor K.Schum. & K.Krause

Genus of plants

Acrobotrys is a monotypic genus of flowering plants in the family Rubiaceae. It was described by Karl Moritz Schumann and Kurt Krause in 1908. The sole species is Acrobotrys discolor, which is endemic to Colombia.
