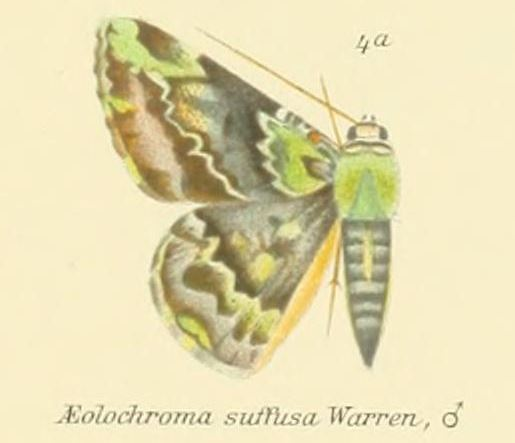
- Aelochroma albifusaria ssp. suffusa

Scientific classification
- Kingdom: Animalia
- Phylum: Arthropoda
- Class: Insecta
- Order: Lepidoptera
- Family: Geometridae
- Genus: Aeolochroma
- Species: A. albifusaria

Binomial name
- Aeolochroma albifusaria (Walker, 1866)

Synonyms
- Boarmia albifusaria Walker, 1866; Actenochroma discolor Warren, 1896; Actenochroma suffusa Prout, 1912

= Aeolochroma albifusaria =

Species of moth

Aeolochroma albifusaria is a moth of the family Geometridae first described by Francis Walker in 1866. It is found on New Guinea.

== Subspecies ==
- Aeolochroma albifusaria albifusaria (New Guinea)
- Aeolochroma albifusaria suffusa Prout, 1927 (Fergusson Island)
