= Asclera discolor =

Scientific classification
- Kingdom: Animalia
- Phylum: Arthropoda
- Class: Insecta
- Order: Coleoptera
- Suborder: Polyphaga
- Infraorder: Cucujiformia
- Family: Oedemeridae
- Genus: Asclera
- Species: A. discolor

Binomial name
- Asclera discolor LeConte, 1874

Species of beetle

Asclera discolor is a species of false blister beetle in the family Oedemeridae. It is found in North America.
