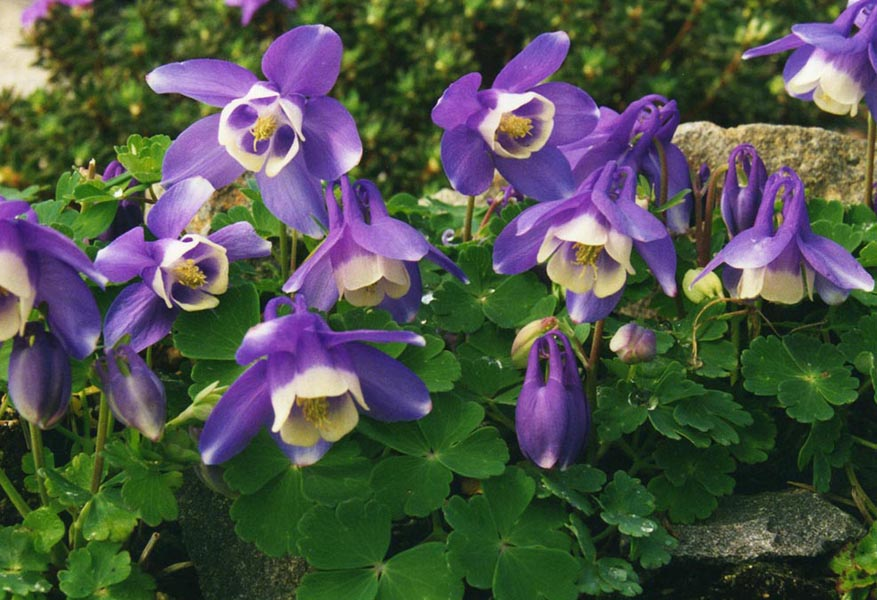
- Aquilegia discolor flowers

Scientific classification
- Kingdom: Plantae
- Clade: Tracheophytes
- Clade: Angiosperms
- Clade: Eudicots
- Order: Ranunculales
- Family: Ranunculaceae
- Genus: Aquilegia
- Species: A. discolor

Binomial name
- Aquilegia discolor Levier & Leresche

Synonyms
- Aquilegia beata var. discolor (Levier & Leresche) Rapaics; Aquilegia pyrenaica subsp. discolor (Levier & Leresche) Pereda & M.Laínz; Aquilegia pyrenaica var. discolor (Levier & Leresche) Willk.; Aquilegia vulgaris var. discolor (Levier & Leresche) Brühl

= Aquilegia discolor =

Spanish columbine species

Aquilegia discolor, commonly known as the two-coloured columbine, is a perennial flowering plant in the family Ranunculaceae, endemic to northwestern Spain.

== Description ==
Aquilegia discolor is a dwarf species, growing to 15 cm (5.9 in) in height with a thick rhizome. The basal leaves are mid-green and biternate with rounded leaflets, smooth above and waxy on the underside. The stem bears one or sometimes two flowers and is downy towards the top. The flowers are nodding and blue-purple with short, inwardly curved nectar spurs and white borders on the inner petals. The stamens barely protrude from the petals, and the anthers are yellow.

== Taxonomy ==
The species was described by the Swiss botanists Emilio (or Émile) Levier (1839–1911) and Louis François Jules Rodolphe Leresche (1808–1885) in 1879, from the type specimen they had collected above the town of Potes in the Picos de Europa in the Cantabrian Mountains on 10 July 1878, at an altitude of 7,000 ft (2,100 m).

=== Etymology ===
The specific epithet discolor means "of different colours, two-coloured".

== Distribution and habitat ==
Aquilegia discolor is endemic to the western Cantabrian Mountains in northwestern Spain. It grows in mountainous, rocky limestone areas.

== Conservation ==
As of December 2024, the species has not been assessed for the IUCN Red List.

== Ecology ==
Aquilegia discolor flowers in late spring to early summer.
