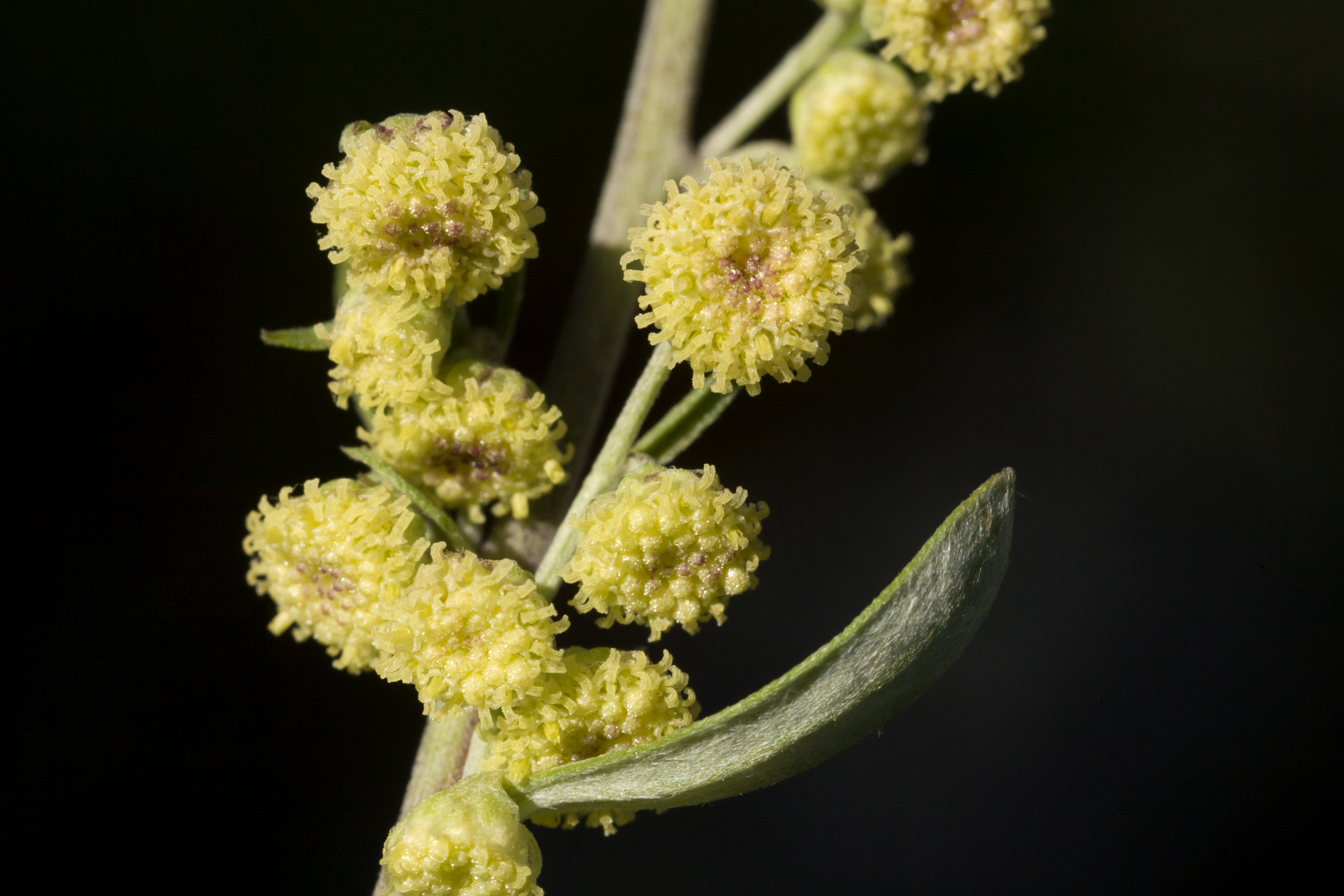

Conservation status
- Apparently Secure (NatureServe)

Scientific classification
- Kingdom: Plantae
- Clade: Tracheophytes
- Clade: Angiosperms
- Clade: Eudicots
- Clade: Asterids
- Order: Asterales
- Family: Asteraceae
- Genus: Artemisia
- Species: A. franserioides

Binomial name
- Artemisia franserioides Greene

Synonyms
- Artemisia discolor Torr. & A.Gray; Artemisia iwayomogi var. discolor (Torr. & A.Gray) Y.N.Lee

= Artemisia franserioides =

Species of flowering plant

Artemisia franserioides, the ragweed sagebrush or bursage mugwort, is a North American species of plants in the sunflower family. It is native to the southwestern United States (Arizona, New Mexico, Colorado, and Oklahoma) as well as northern Mexico (Chihuahua).

Artemisia franserioides is a biennial or perennial growing up to 100 cm (40 inches) tall. It is faintly aromatic, with many small, hanging flower heads. It grows in conifer forests.

The specific epithet franserioides is derived from Latinized Greek, meaning resembling the genus Franseria. Franseria is now a synonym of Ambrosia (ragweeds).
