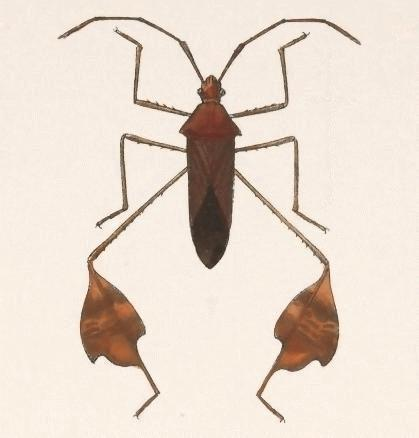
- Anisoscelis affinis

Scientific classification
- Kingdom: Animalia
- Phylum: Arthropoda
- Clade: Pancrustacea
- Class: Insecta
- Order: Hemiptera
- Suborder: Heteroptera
- Family: Coreidae
- Subfamily: Coreinae
- Tribe: Anisoscelini; Laporte, 1832

= Anisoscelini =

Tribe of true bugs

Anisoscelini is a tribe of leaf-footed bugs in the family Coreidae. It was formerly spelled Anisoscelidini, but the tribal name spelling was incorrectly formed.

== Description ==
Anisoscelini species are elongated with flattened tibia of the legs in the shape of a leaf. The antennae have the 2 and 3 segments flattened (Chondrocera sp.) or some species having the 2 and 3 segments terete, or cylindrical, slightly tapering at both ends, circular in cross section, and smooth-surfaced. The length of the first segment of the antennae is as long as the length of the anterior margin of the eye to the tarsus (Narnia sp.).

== Distribution ==
The tribe consists of species found mostly in the Americas and especially neotropical environments; however, genera such as Leptoglossus may also be represented in Europe (mostly introductions) and eastern Asia.

== Genera ==
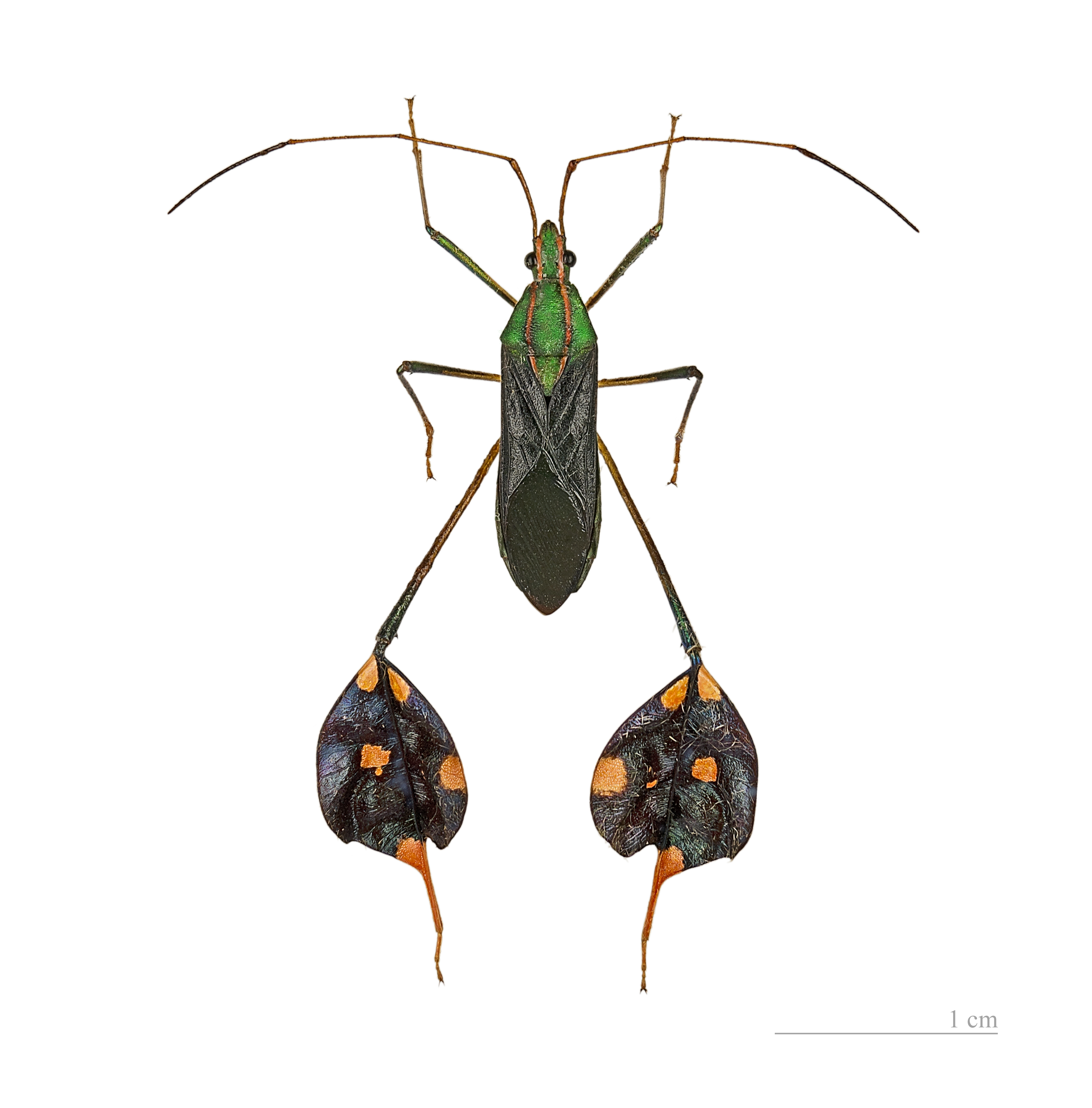
Diactor bilineatus - MHNT

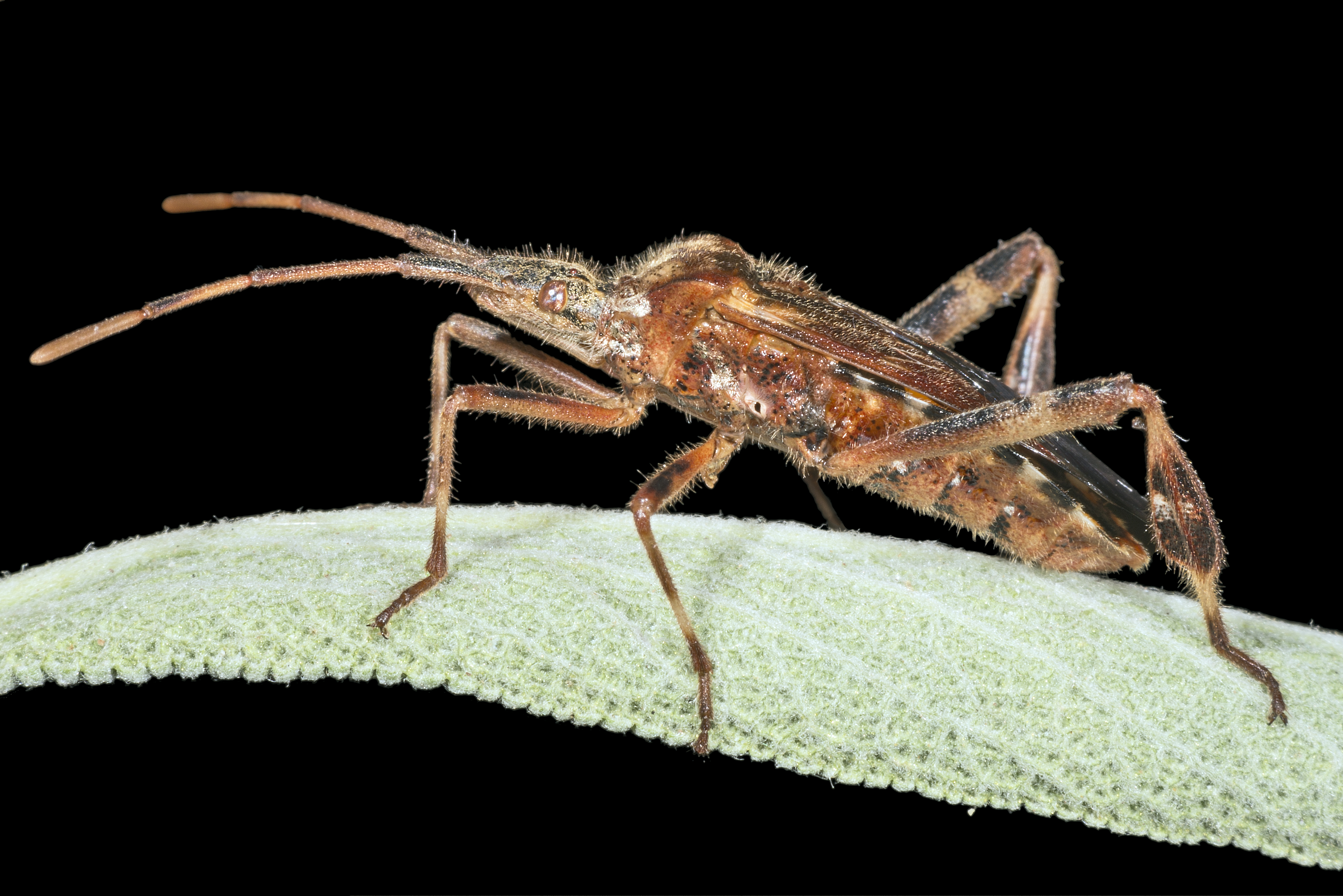
Leptoglossus occidentalis

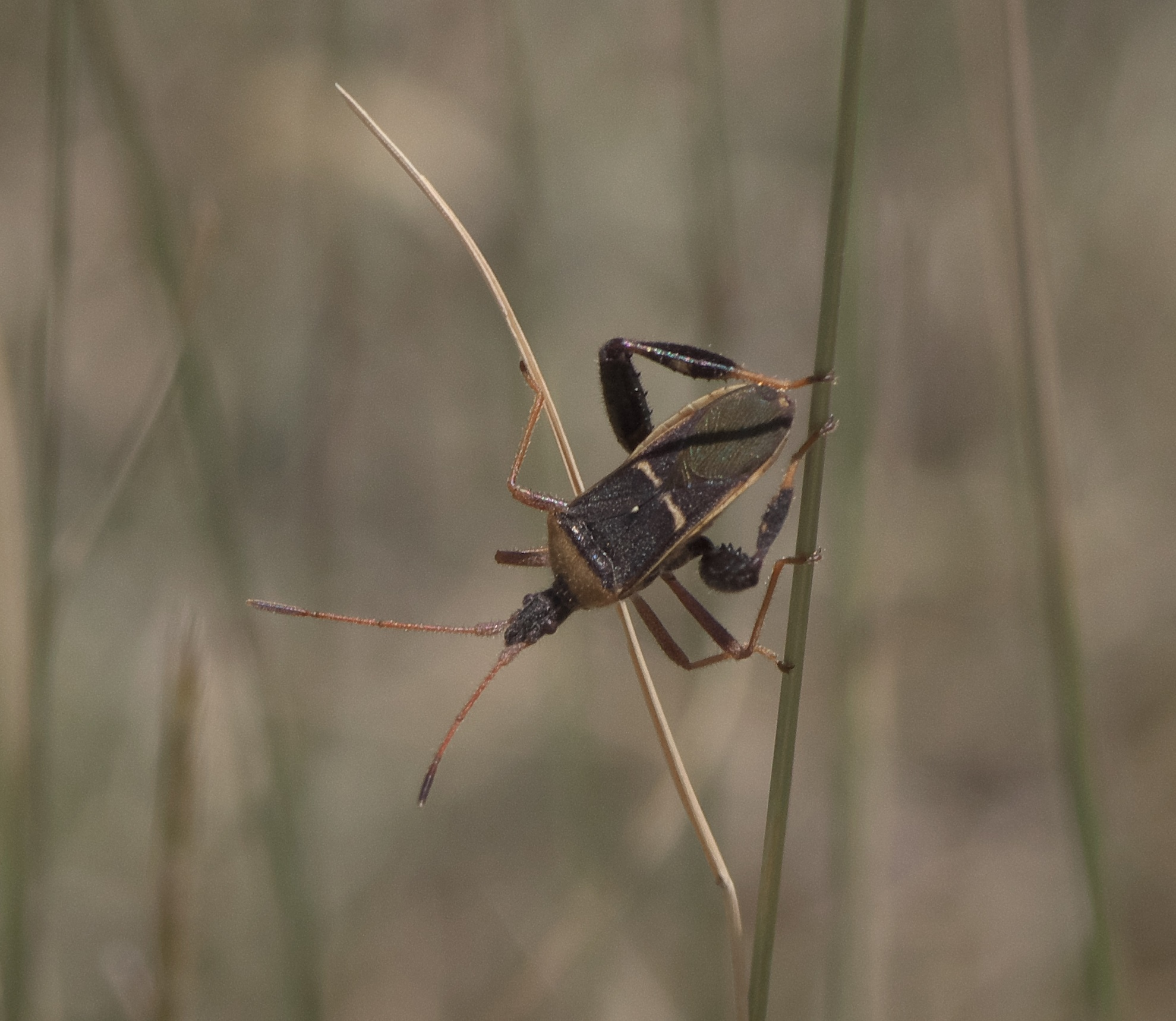
Narnia snowi

The Coreoidea Species File includes:

1. Anisoscelis Latreille, 1829^{i c g b}
2. Baldus Stål, 1868^{i c g}
3. Bellamynacoris Brailovsky, 1997^{i c g}
4. Belonomus Uhler, 1869^{i c g}
5. Chondrocera Laporte, 1832^{i c g b}
6. Coribergia Casini, 1984^{i c g}
7. Dalmatomammurius Brailovsky, 1982^{i c g}
8. Diactor Perty, 1830^{i c g}
9. Holhymenia Le Peletier and Serville, 1825^{i c g}
10. Kalinckascelis Brailovsky, 1990^{i c g}
11. Leptoglossus Guérin-Méneville, 1831^{i c g b}
12. Leptopelios Brailovsky, 2001^{i c g}
13. Leptoscelis Laporte, 1832^{i c g}
14. Leptostellana Brailovsky, 1997^{i c g}
15. Malvana Stål, 1865^{i c g}
16. Malvanaioides Brailovsky, 1990^{i c g}
17. Narnia Stål, 1862^{i c g b}
18. Onoremia Brailovsky, 1995^{i c g}
19. Petalopus Kirby, 1828
20. Phthia Stål, 1862^{i c g b}
21. Phthiacnemia Brailovsky, 2009^{i c g}
22. Phthiadema Brailovsky, 2009^{i c g}
23. Phthiarella Brailovsky, 2009^{i c g}
24. Plunentis Stål, 1860^{i c g}
25. Rhytidophthia Brailovsky, 2009^{i c g}
26. Sephinioides Brailovsky, 1996^{i c g}
27. Tarpeius Stål, 1868^{i c g}
28. Ugnius Stål, 1860^{i c g}

Data sources: i = ITIS, c = Catalogue of Life, g = GBIF, b = Bugguide.net

== Example species ==
- Chondrocera laticornis
