= Cosipara molliculella =

Scientific classification
- Kingdom: Animalia
- Phylum: Arthropoda
- Class: Insecta
- Order: Lepidoptera
- Family: Crambidae
- Genus: Cosipara
- Species: C. molliculella

Binomial name
- Cosipara molliculella (Dyar, 1929)

Synonyms
- Scoparia molliculella Dyar, 1929

Species of moth

Cosipara molliculella is a moth in the family Crambidae. It was described by Harrison Gray Dyar Jr. in 1929. It is found in Puebla, Mexico.

The wingspan is about 14 mm. Adults are similar to Cosipara cyclophora, but slightly smaller and greyer.
