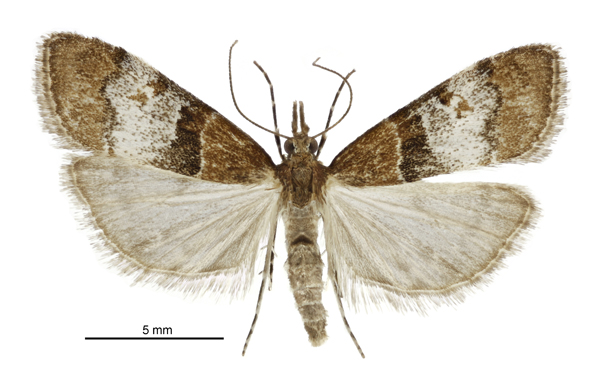
- Female
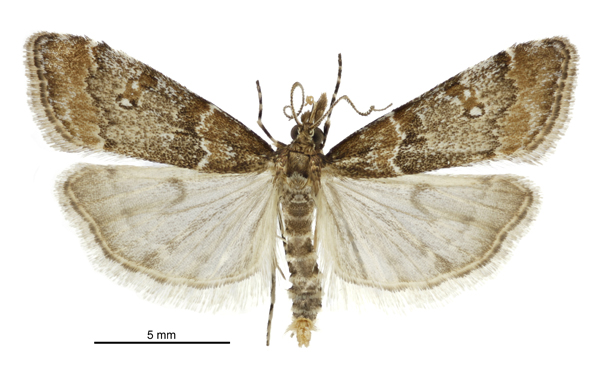
- Male

Scientific classification
- Kingdom: Animalia
- Phylum: Arthropoda
- Class: Insecta
- Order: Lepidoptera
- Family: Crambidae
- Genus: Antiscopa
- Species: A. acompa

Binomial name
- Antiscopa acompa (Meyrick, 1884)

Synonyms
- Scoparia acompa Meyrick, 1884

= Antiscopa acompa =

Species of moth, endemic to New Zealand

Antiscopa acompa is a moth in the family Crambidae. It was first described by Edward Meyrick in 1884. It is endemic to New Zealand and is found both the North and South Islands. The species inhabits native forest and adult moths are attracted to light.

== Taxonomy ==
This species was first named Scoparia acompa by Edward Meyrick in 1884. In 1885 Meyrick gave a detailed description of the species using specimens collected near Lake Wakatipu at 1,200 feet. George Hudson discussed and illustrated this species under the name Scoparia acompa in his 1928 book The butterflies and moths of New Zealand. In 1964 Eugene Munroe placed this species in the genus Antiscopa. This placement was accepted by John S. Dugdale in 1988. The male holotype, collected at Lake Wakatipu, is held at the Natural History Museum, London.

== Description ==
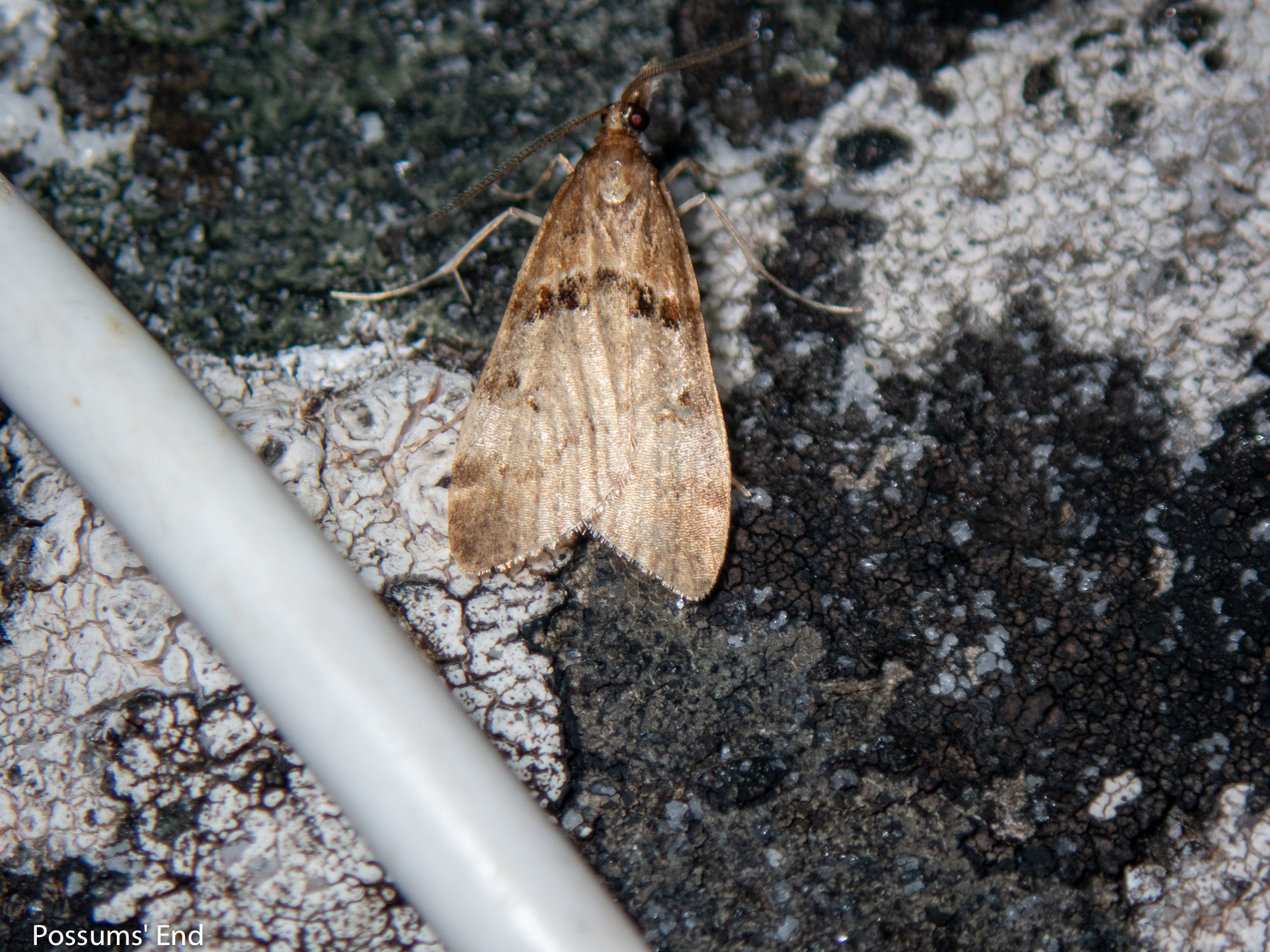
Observation of live A. acompa.

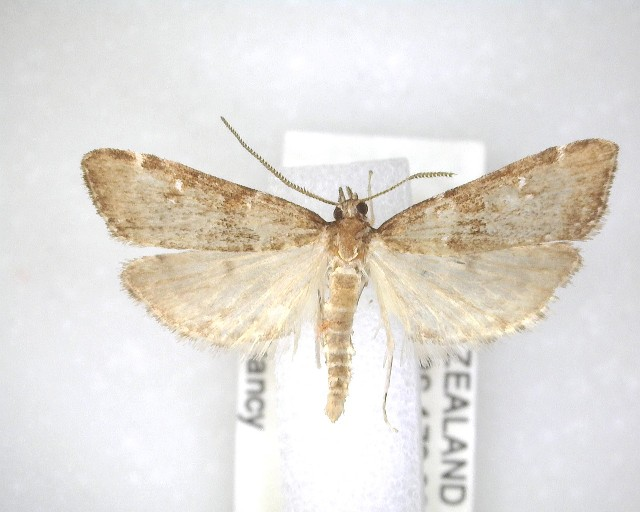
Antiscopa acompa

In 1885 Meyrick gave a detailed description of the species as follows:

Male. — 17 1/2-19 mm. Head, antennae, and thorax ochreous-fuscous, shoulders suffusedly dark fuscous; antennas deeply dentate, ciliations 2/3. Palpi 3, ochreous-fuscous irrorated with blackish, internally and on basal joint white. Abdomen whitish-ochreous. Legs whitish-ochreous, irrorated with dark fuscous, tibiaa and tarsi banded with dark fuscous. Forewings triangular, costa gently arched, apex round-pointed, hindmargin almost straight, oblique; ochreous-fuscous; base irrorated with dark fuscous; first line very slender, obscure, whitish, posteriorly finely blackish-margined, not oblique, somewhat curved, sinuate inwards above inner margin; space between first and second lines fuscous, irrorated with dark fuscous, with a few pale scales; orbicular and claviform both round, ochreous-brown, obscurely blackish-margined, touching first line; reniform 8-shaped, white, suffusedly blackish-margined; second line very slender, obscure, whitish, anteriorly finely blackish-margined, rather abruptly curved above middle; subterminal obsolete; a slender interrupted white hindmarginal line : cilia ochreous-whitish, with two dark grey lines. Hindwings 1 1/3, whitish-grey; lunule, postmedian line and a hindmarginal line darker grey, distinct; cilia whitish, with a dark grey interrupted line.

Meyrick regarded this species as distinctive as a result of its forewing colouration and markings. However this species is very similar in appearance to Antiscopa epicomia but can be distinguished as A. acompa has a thicker antemedian forewing line.

== Distribution ==
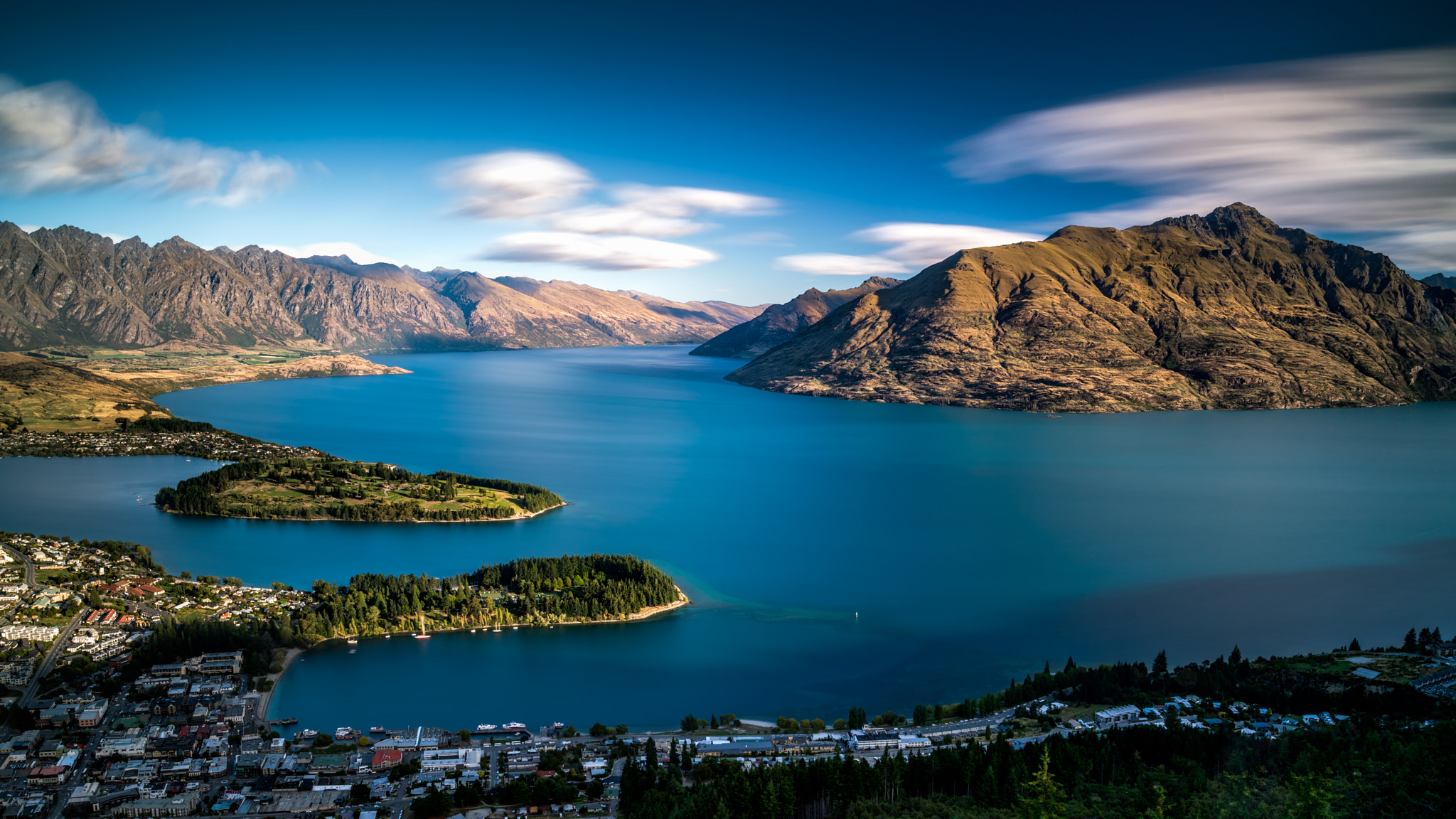
Lake Wakatipu, type locality of A. acompa.

This species is endemic to New Zealand. It has been collected in both the North and South Islands.

== Habitat ==
This species inhabits native forest.

== Behaviour ==
Adults have been recorded on wing from October to February. Adults of this species are attracted to light.
