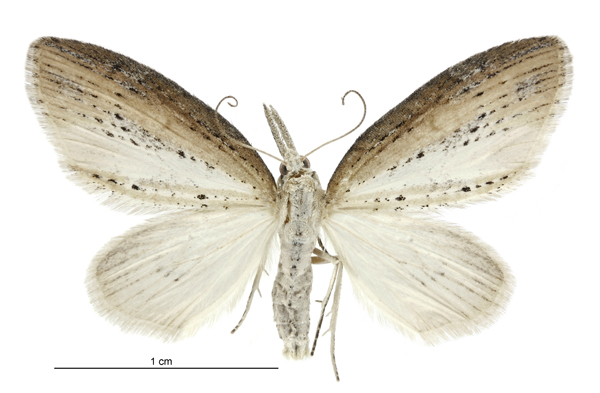
- Female
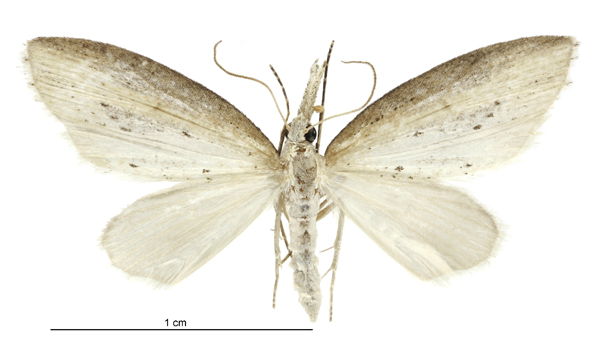
- Male

Scientific classification
- Domain: Eukaryota
- Kingdom: Animalia
- Phylum: Arthropoda
- Class: Insecta
- Order: Lepidoptera
- Family: Geometridae
- Genus: Microdes
- Species: M. epicryptis

Binomial name
- Microdes epicryptis Meyrick, 1897

= Microdes epicryptis =

Species of moth endemic to New Zealand

Microdes epicryptis is a moth in the family Geometridae. It is endemic to New Zealand and is found on the North, South, Stewart, Chatham and Antipodes Islands. It inhabits lowland wetlands. Larvae feed on species in the Juncaceae family and a specific larval host is Apodasmia similis. Adults are on the wing from September to March. They are nocturnal and are attracted to light.

== Taxonomy ==
This species was first described by Edward Meyrick in 1897 using two specimens collected in Wellington by George Hudson. In 1927 Alfred Philpott discussed the male genitalia of this species. George Hudson discussed and illustrated this species in his 1928 publication The butterflies and moths of New Zealand. In 1939 Hudson also discussed this species in the supplement to that work. In 1971 John S. Dugdale discussed and redescribed this species. The male lectotype is held at the Natural History Museum, London.

== Description ==
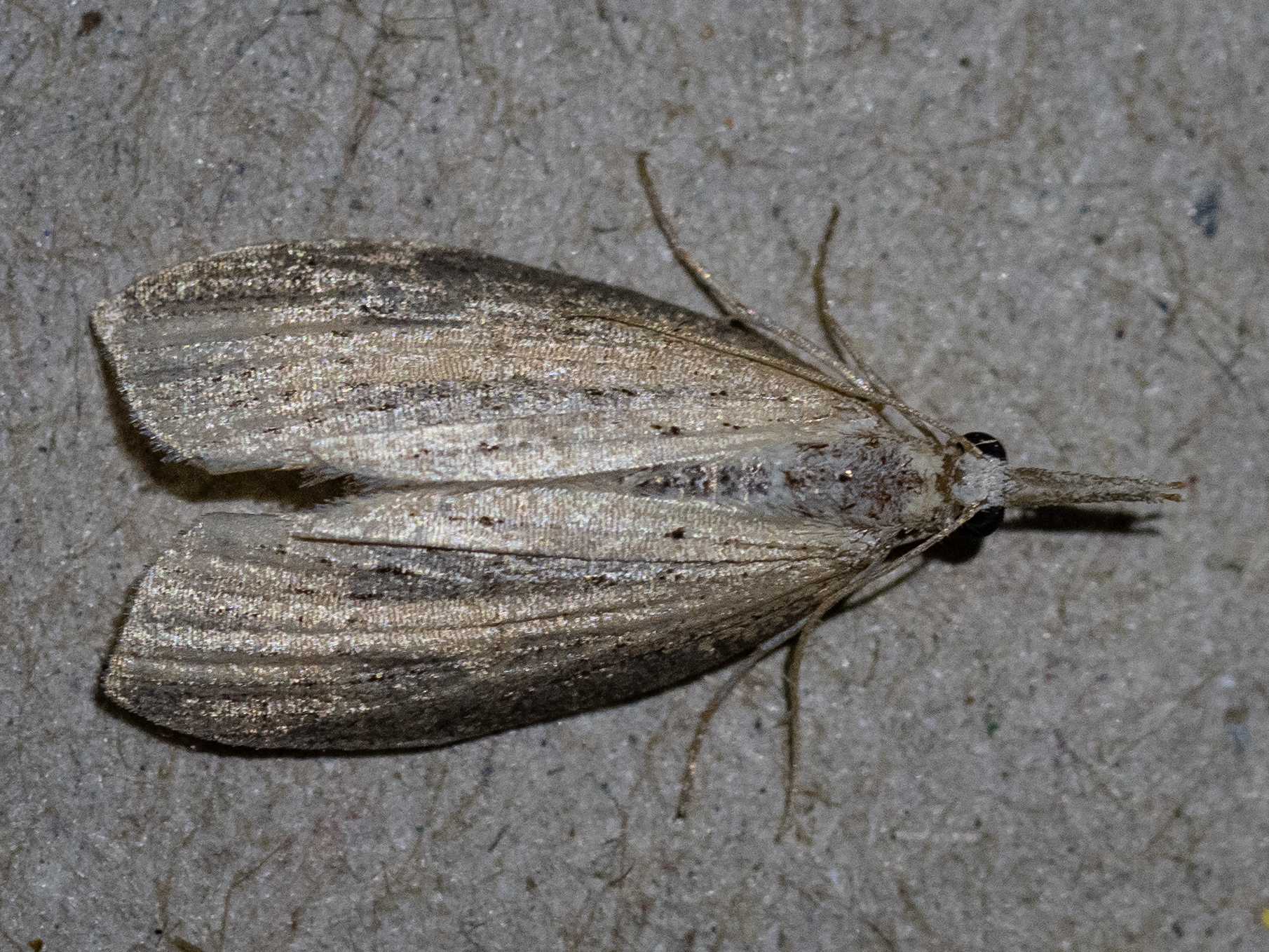
Microdes epicryptis observed in Ngāruawāhia.

The larvae of this species has been described as being approximately 1/2 an inch in length when fully grown and is pale ochreous in colour, with a series of dark brown V-shaped markings along its back. The larvae are said to be challenging to see when resting on the flower spike of its host plants as both the colouration and markings of the larvae of this species provide excellent camouflage.

Meyrick described the adults of this species as follows:

♂ ♀ 21-22 mm. Head and thorax whitish-ochreous. Palpi 6, whitish-ochreous sprinkled with dark fuscous. Forewings with costa strongly arched, termen unevenly bowed, very oblique ; whitish-ochreous, more whitish on dorsal half, somewhat deeper and sometimes infuscated towards costa, with some scattered black scales ; a median longitudinal streak of clear pale ground-colour ; second line indicated by a strongly curved series of black dots on veins: cilia ochreous-whitish. Hindwings considerably narrowed ; ochreous-grey-whitish; in ♂ with area of cell depressed, and a costal streak of modified blackish scales from near base to beyond middle.

M. epicryptis has been confused with Antiscopa elaphra known as Scoparia elaphra. The species in the Antipodes Islands is smaller and has forewings that are narrower and pointier than mainland specimens.

== Distribution ==
This species is endemic to New Zealand. This species if found in the North, South, Stewart, Chatham and the Antipodes Islands.

== Habitat and hosts ==
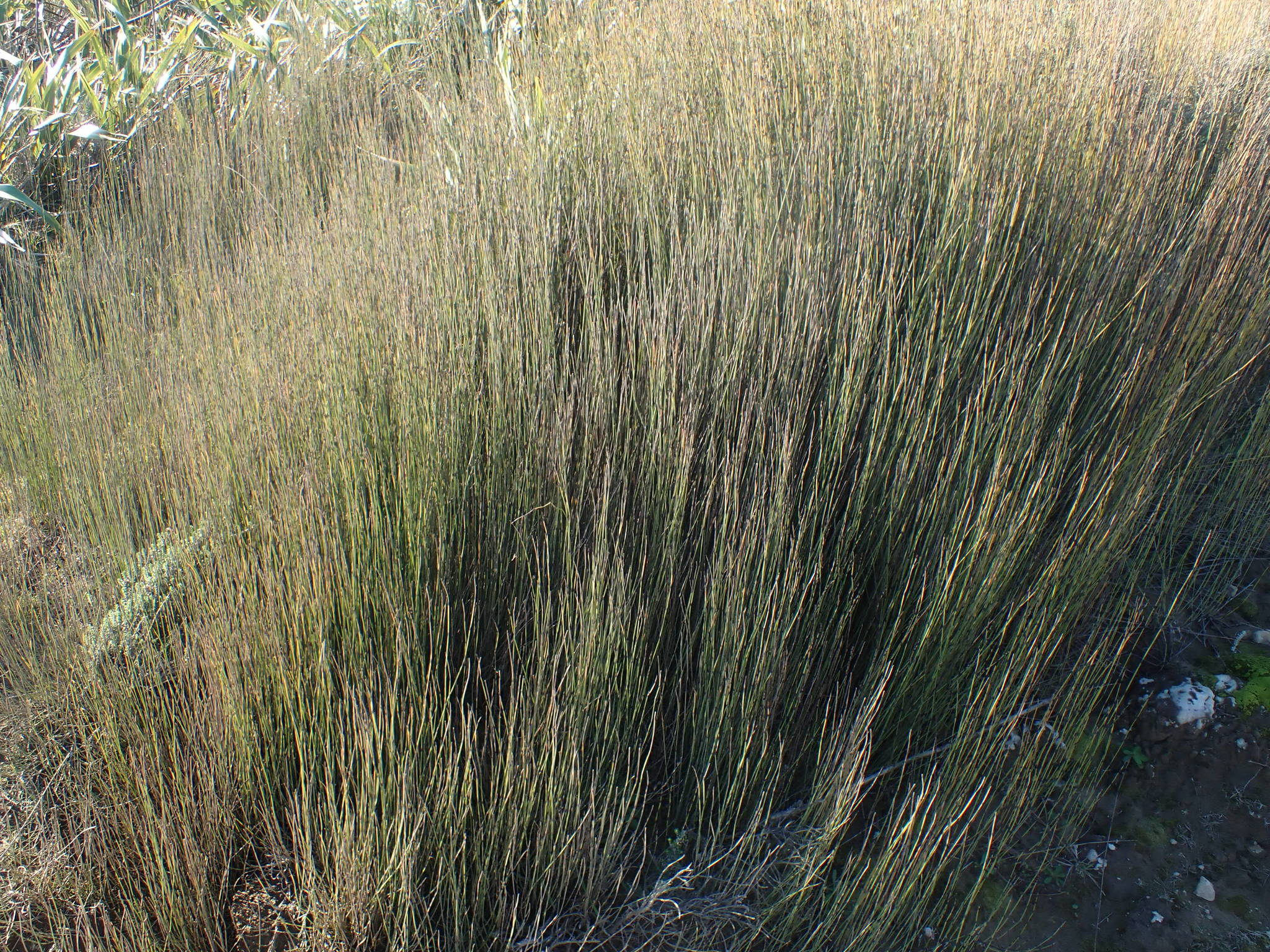
Larval host A. similis.

M. epicryptis inhabits lowland wetlands. Larvae feed on species in the Juncaceae family and a specific larval host is Apodasmia similis as specimens of this moth have been reared from this plant.

== Behaviour ==
The adults of the species are on the wing from September to March. They are nocturnal and are attracted to light.
