= Micraglossa flavidalis =

Scientific classification
- Kingdom: Animalia
- Phylum: Arthropoda
- Class: Insecta
- Order: Lepidoptera
- Family: Crambidae
- Genus: Micraglossa
- Species: M. flavidalis

Binomial name
- Micraglossa flavidalis Hampson, 1907

Species of moth

Micraglossa flavidalis is a moth in the family Crambidae. It was described by George Hampson in 1907. It is found in the Chinese provinces of Gansu, Shaanxi, Henan, Sichuan, Hubei, Guizhou and Yunnan.

The length of the forewings is 5.5-7.5 mm for males and 6–7 mm for females.
