= Micraglossa =

Scientific classification
- Domain: Eukaryota
- Kingdom: Animalia
- Phylum: Arthropoda
- Class: Insecta
- Order: Lepidoptera
- Family: Crambidae
- Subfamily: Scopariinae
- Genus: Micraglossa; Warren, 1891

Synonyms
- Microglossa Hampson, 1907

Genus of moths

Micraglossa is a genus of moths of the family Crambidae.

== Species ==
- Micraglossa aureata Inoue, 1982
- Micraglossa beia Li, Li & Nuss, 2010
- Micraglossa citrochroa (Turner, 1908)
- Micraglossa convatalalis Klunder van Gijen, 1913
- Micraglossa cupritincta Hampson, 1917
- Micraglossa flavidalis Hampson, 1907
- Micraglossa manoi Sasaki, 1998
- Micraglossa michaelshafferi Li, Li & Nuss, 2010
- Micraglossa nana Li, Li & Nuss, 2010
- Micraglossa oenealis Hampson, 1897
- Micraglossa scoparialis Warren, 1891
- Micraglossa straminealis (Hampson, 1903)
- Micraglossa tagalica Nuss, 1998
- Micraglossa tricitra (Meyrick, 1930)
- Micraglossa zhongguoensis Li, Li & Nuss, 2010
