= Cholius =

Scientific classification
- Kingdom: Animalia
- Phylum: Arthropoda
- Class: Insecta
- Order: Lepidoptera
- Family: Crambidae
- Subfamily: Scopariinae
- Genus: Cholius; Guenée, 1845

Genus of moths

Cholius is a genus of moths of the family Crambidae.

== Species ==
- Cholius leucopeplalis (Hampson, 1900)
- Cholius luteolaris (Scopoli, 1772)
