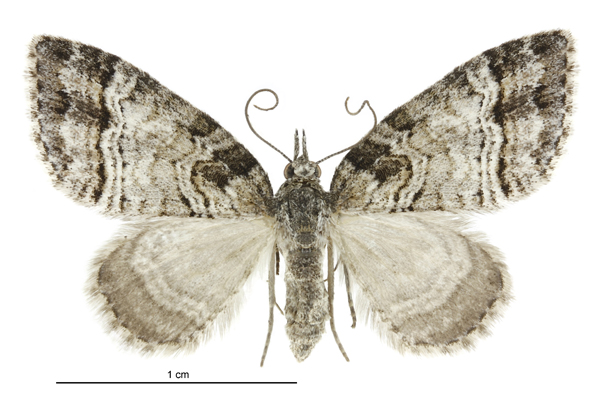
- Female.
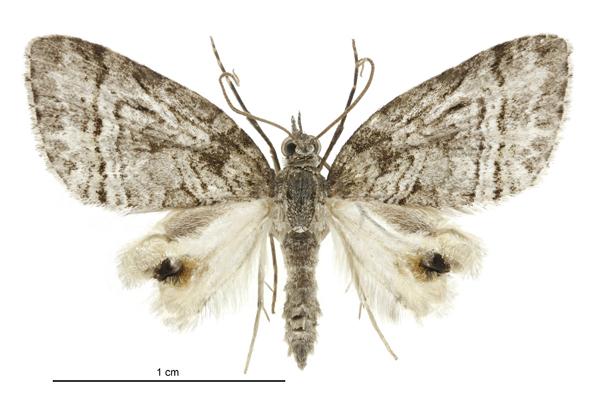
- Male.

Scientific classification
- Domain: Eukaryota
- Kingdom: Animalia
- Phylum: Arthropoda
- Class: Insecta
- Order: Lepidoptera
- Family: Geometridae
- Genus: Microdes
- Species: M. quadristrigata

Binomial name
- Microdes quadristrigata (Walker, 1862)

Synonyms
- Larentia quadristrigata Walker, 1862; Microdes toriata Felder & Rogenhofer, 1875; Microcalcarifera quadristrigata (Walker, 1862); Larentia interclusa Walker, 1862; Chloroclystis rectilineata Hudson, 1898

= Microdes quadristrigata =

Species of moth

Microdes quadristrigata is a moth in the family Geometridae. It is endemic to New Zealand and is found in the North, South and Stewart Islands. Adults have been observed from February to May as well as in November and December. They are attracted to light.

== Taxonomy ==
This species was first described by Francis Walker in 1862 using specimens collected by Daniel Bolton in Auckland and named Larentia quadristrigata, although Walker was in doubt as to whether Larentia was the appropriate genus to place this species. In the same publication, thinking he was describing a new species, Walker also named this species Larentia interclusa. This name was synonymised by Edward Meyrick in 1884. In 1885 Meyrick raised the possibility that this species should be placed in the genus Microdes. Cajetan von Felder and Alois Friedrich Rogenhofer, again thinking they were describing a new species, named this species Microdes toriata in 1875. This name was synonymised by Meyrick in 1917. In 1898 George Hudson, again thinking he was describing a new species, named it Chloroclystis rectilineata. This name was synonymised by Meyrick in 1913. In 1927 Alfred Philpott discussed the male genitalia of this species. Hudson discussed and illustrated this species in his 1928 book The butterflies and moths of New Zealand. In 1988 John S. Dugdale discussed this species and confirmed its placement in the genus Microdes. The female holotype is held at the Natural History Museum, London.

== Description ==
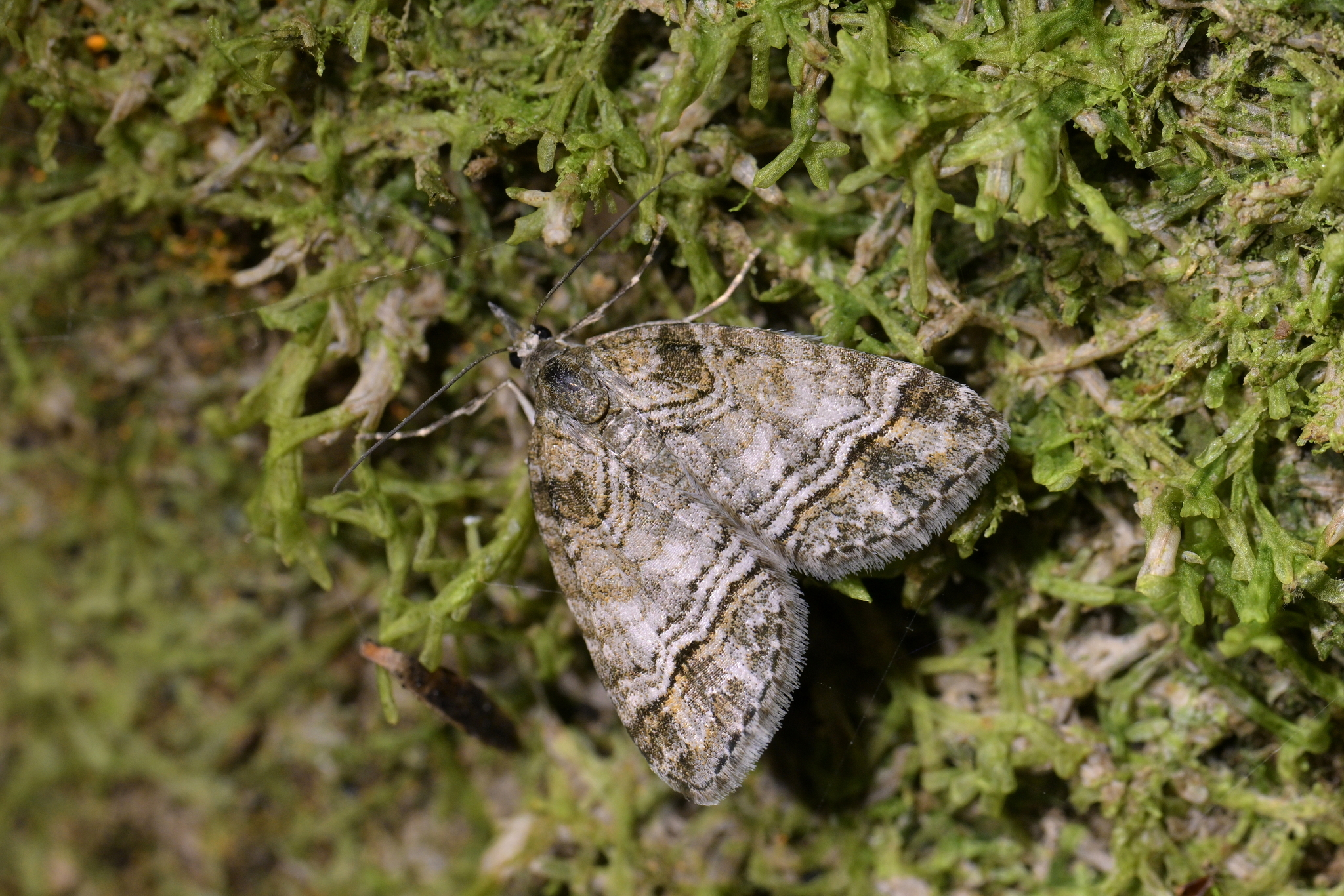
M. quadristrigata in the Wellington region.

Hudson described this species as follows:

The expansion of the wings is 3/4 inch. The fore-wings are pale grey; there are several irregular black, transverse lines near the base, very broad on the costa; a broad, pale, central area with no distinct markings; then two very fine, almost straight, parallel, dark transverse lines alternating with two broader white lines, and followed by a very conspicuous black line, this being again immediately followed by a fainter black line; beyond these lines the wing is darker, with a wavy transverse white line and a row of black terminal marks. The hind-wings are grey with several faint, wavy, transverse lines and a series of darker marks on the termen. The cilia of all the wings are grey.

== Distribution ==
This species is endemic to New Zealand. It is found in the North, South and Stewart Islands.

== Behaviour ==
Adults have been observed on the wing from February to May and then in November and December. They are attracted to light.
