= Cosipara delphusa =

Scientific classification
- Domain: Eukaryota
- Kingdom: Animalia
- Phylum: Arthropoda
- Class: Insecta
- Order: Lepidoptera
- Family: Crambidae
- Genus: Cosipara
- Species: C. delphusa

Binomial name
- Cosipara delphusa (H. Druce, 1896)

Synonyms
- Scoparia delphusa H. Druce, 1896

Species of moth

Cosipara delphusa is a moth in the family Crambidae. It was described by Herbert Druce in 1896. It is found in Mexico and Guatemala.

The forewings are pale greyish brown, crossed by two waved white lines edged with black on the inner side. There is a dark brown spot partly crossing the wing from the costal margin towards the base. The hindwings are semihyaline greyish white, slightly shaded with brown near the apex.
