= Notocrambus holomelas =

Scientific classification
- Kingdom: Animalia
- Phylum: Arthropoda
- Class: Insecta
- Order: Lepidoptera
- Family: Crambidae
- Genus: Notocrambus
- Species: N. holomelas

Binomial name
- Notocrambus holomelas Turner, 1922

Species of moth

Notocrambus holomelas is a moth in the family Crambidae. It was described by Turner in 1922. It is found in Australia, where it has been recorded from Tasmania.

The wingspan is about 20 mm. The forewings are blackish, sometimes with a few whitish scales in the disc towards the tornus. The hindwings are dark-fuscous. Adults have been recorded on wing in January.
