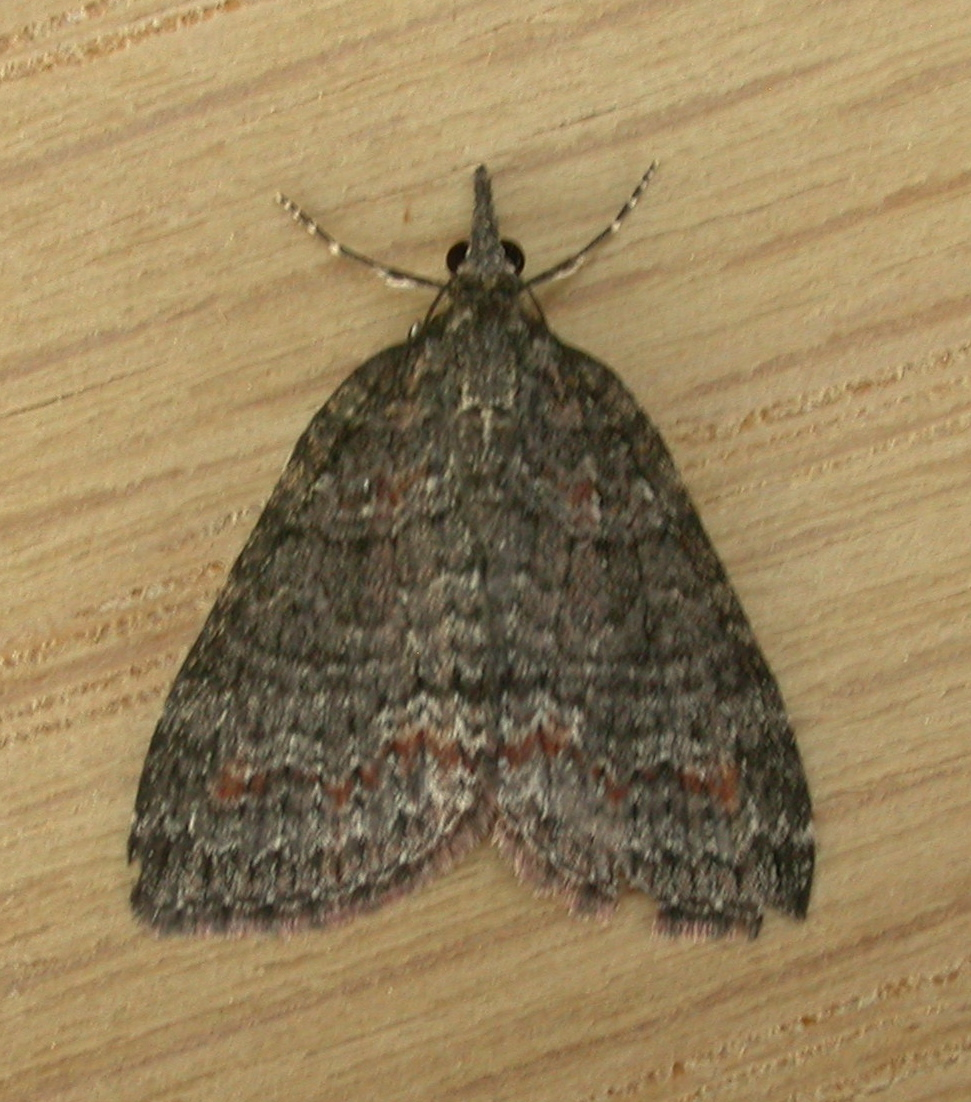
- Microdes squamulata Guenée, 1857, to MV light, Aranda, ACT, 20/21 September 2008

Scientific classification
- Kingdom: Animalia
- Phylum: Arthropoda
- Class: Insecta
- Order: Lepidoptera
- Family: Geometridae
- Tribe: Eupitheciini
- Genus: Microdes; Guenée, 1857

Synonyms
- Oesymna Walker, 1869

= Microdes =

Genus of moths

Microdes is a genus of moths in the family Geometridae. They occur in Australia and New Zealand.

== Species ==
There are 13 recognized species:

- Microdes arcuata Swinhoe, 1902
- Microdes asystata Turner, 1922
- Microdes decora Turner, 1942
- Microdes diplodonta Turner, 1904
- Microdes epicryptis Meyrick, 1897
- Microdes haemobaphes Turner, 1926
- Microdes leptobrya Turner, 1939
- Microdes melanocausta Meyrick, 1891
- Microdes oriochares Turner, 1922
- Microdes quadristrigata (Walker, 1862)
- Microdes squamulata Guenée, 1857
- Microdes typhopa Lower, 1897
- Microdes villosata Guenée, 1857
