= Afrarpia =

Scientific classification
- Kingdom: Animalia
- Phylum: Arthropoda
- Clade: Pancrustacea
- Class: Insecta
- Order: Lepidoptera
- Family: Crambidae
- Subfamily: Scopariinae
- Genus: Afrarpia; Maes, 2004
- Species: A. mariepsiensis

Binomial name
- Afrarpia mariepsiensis Maes, 2004

Genus of moths

Afrarpia is a genus of moths of the family Crambidae. It contains only one species, Afrarpia mariepsiensis, which is found in South Africa.
