= Micraglossa citrochroa =

Scientific classification
- Domain: Eukaryota
- Kingdom: Animalia
- Phylum: Arthropoda
- Class: Insecta
- Order: Lepidoptera
- Family: Crambidae
- Genus: Micraglossa
- Species: M. citrochroa

Binomial name
- Micraglossa citrochroa (Turner, 1908)

Synonyms
- Myriostephes citrochroa Turner, 1908; Scoparia citrochroa

Species of moth

Micraglossa citrochroa is a moth in the family Crambidae. It was described by Turner in 1908. It is found in Australia, where it has been recorded from Queensland.
