= Microdes asystata =

Scientific classification
- Kingdom: Animalia
- Phylum: Arthropoda
- Clade: Pancrustacea
- Class: Insecta
- Order: Lepidoptera
- Family: Geometridae
- Genus: Microdes
- Species: M. asystata

Binomial name
- Microdes asystata Turner, 1922

Species of moth

Microdes asystata is a moth in the family Geometridae. It is found in Australia (including New South Wales, the type location).
