= Micraglossa tricitra =

Scientific classification
- Kingdom: Animalia
- Phylum: Arthropoda
- Class: Insecta
- Order: Lepidoptera
- Family: Crambidae
- Genus: Micraglossa
- Species: M. tricitra

Binomial name
- Micraglossa tricitra (Meyrick, 1930)

Synonyms
- Scoparia tricitra Meyrick, 1930

Species of moth

Micraglossa tricitra is a moth in the family Crambidae. It was described by Edward Meyrick in 1930. It is found on New Guinea.
