= Iranarpia albalis =

Scientific classification
- Kingdom: Animalia
- Phylum: Arthropoda
- Class: Insecta
- Order: Lepidoptera
- Family: Crambidae
- Genus: Iranarpia
- Species: I. albalis

Binomial name
- Iranarpia albalis (Amsel, 1961)

Synonyms
- Scoparia albalis Amsel, 1961

Species of moth

Iranarpia albalis is a moth in the family Crambidae. It was described by Hans Georg Amsel in 1961. It is found in Iran.
