= Dasyscopa =

Scientific classification
- Domain: Eukaryota
- Kingdom: Animalia
- Phylum: Arthropoda
- Class: Insecta
- Order: Lepidoptera
- Family: Crambidae
- Subfamily: Scopariinae
- Genus: Dasyscopa; Meyrick, 1894

Genus of moths

Dasyscopa is a genus of moths of the family Crambidae.

== Species ==
- Dasyscopa axeli Nuss, 1998
- Dasyscopa barbipennis (Hampson, 1897)
- Dasyscopa homogenes Meyrick, 1894
