= Gesneria rindgeorum =

Scientific classification
- Kingdom: Animalia
- Phylum: Arthropoda
- Clade: Pancrustacea
- Class: Insecta
- Order: Lepidoptera
- Family: Crambidae
- Genus: Gesneria
- Species: G. rindgeorum

Binomial name
- Gesneria rindgeorum Munroe, 1972

Species of moth

Gesneria rindgeorum is a species of moth in the family Crambidae described by Eugene G. Munroe in 1972. It is found in the US states of Utah, Wyoming, Montana and Washington.
