= Microdes haemobaphes =

Scientific classification
- Domain: Eukaryota
- Kingdom: Animalia
- Phylum: Arthropoda
- Class: Insecta
- Order: Lepidoptera
- Family: Geometridae
- Genus: Microdes
- Species: M. haemobaphes

Binomial name
- Microdes haemobaphes Turner, 1926

Species of moth

Microdes haemobaphes is a moth in the family Geometridae. It is found in Australia (including Tasmania, the type location).
