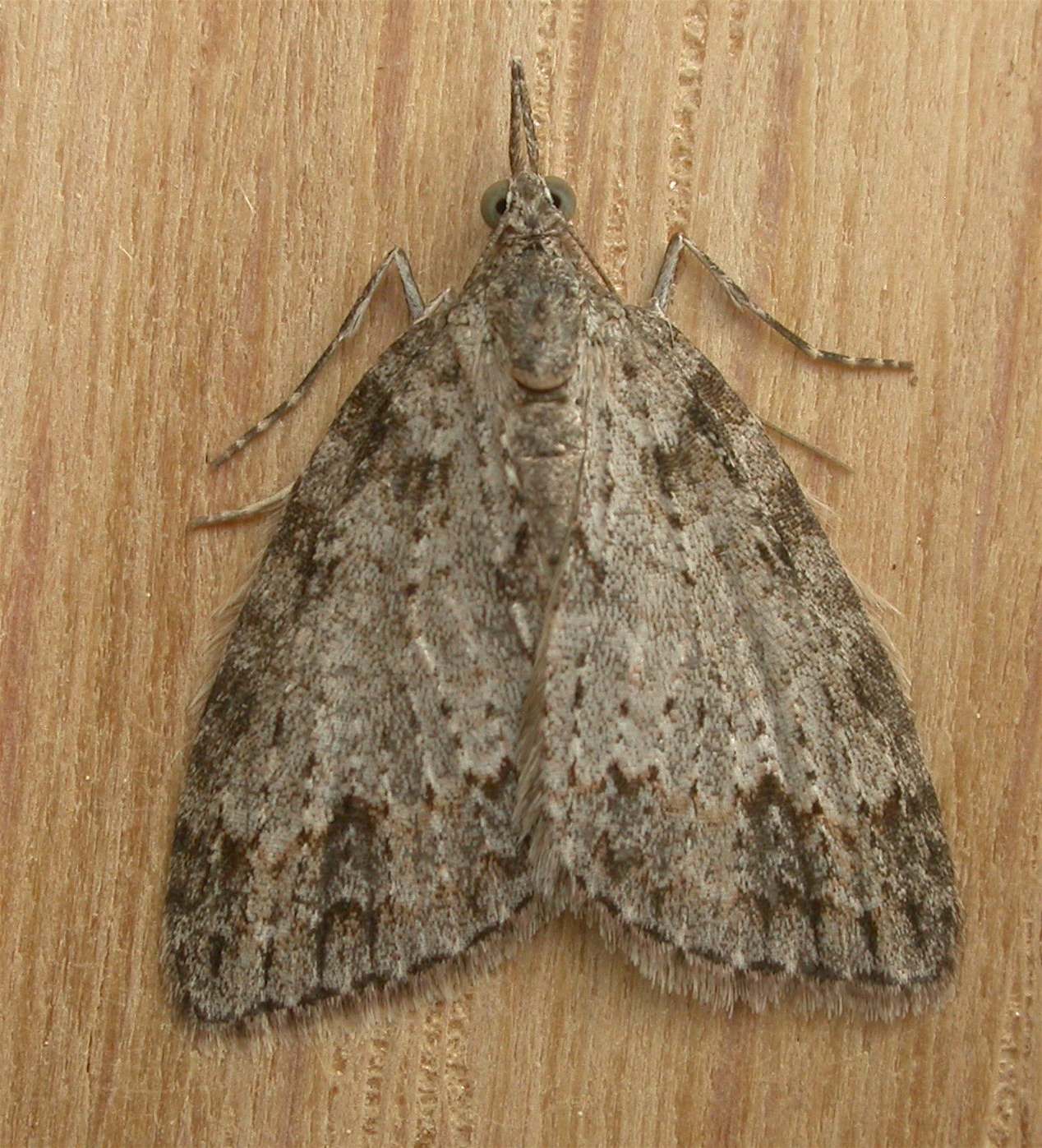

Scientific classification
- Kingdom: Animalia
- Phylum: Arthropoda
- Class: Insecta
- Order: Lepidoptera
- Family: Geometridae
- Genus: Microdes
- Species: M. villosata

Binomial name
- Microdes villosata Guenée, 1857

Synonyms
- Microdes toriata Felder & Rogenhofer, 1875; Panagra mixtaria Walker, 1863

= Microdes villosata =

Species of moth

Microdes villosata is a species of moth of the family Geometridae. It is found in Australia, including Tasmania.
