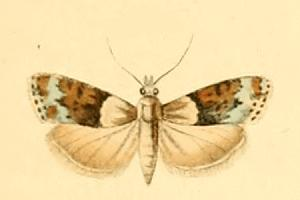

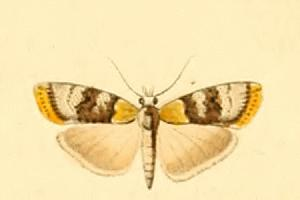

Scientific classification
- Domain: Eukaryota
- Kingdom: Animalia
- Phylum: Arthropoda
- Class: Insecta
- Order: Lepidoptera
- Family: Crambidae
- Genus: Anarpia
- Species: A. incertalis

Binomial name
- Anarpia incertalis (Duponchel, 1832)

Synonyms
- Eudorea incertalis Duponchel, 1832; Eudorea pyrenaealis Duponchel, 1842; Scoparia phycophanes Meyrick, 1937; Scoparia pyrenaealis ab. prinzi Schawerda, 1913; Scoparia rupestris Meyrick, 1937

= Anarpia incertalis =

Species of moth

Anarpia incertalis is a species of moth in the family Crambidae. It is found in France, Spain, Portugal, Italy, Croatia, Bosnia and Herzegovina, Bulgaria, the Republic of Macedonia, Greece and on Corsica, Sardinia, Sicily, Crete and Cyprus, as well as in Iraq, Russia and North Africa, including Morocco.
