= Cosipara =

Scientific classification
- Kingdom: Animalia
- Phylum: Arthropoda
- Clade: Pancrustacea
- Class: Insecta
- Order: Lepidoptera
- Family: Crambidae
- Subfamily: Scopariinae
- Genus: Cosipara; Munroe, 1972

Genus of moths

Cosipara is a genus of moths of the family Crambidae.

== Species ==
- Cosipara chiricahuae Munroe, 1972
- Cosipara cyclophora (Dyar, 1918)
- Cosipara delphusa (Druce, 1896)
- Cosipara flexuosa (Dyar, 1918)
- Cosipara modulalis Munroe, 1972
- Cosipara molliculella (Dyar, 1929)
- Cosipara smithi (Druce, 1896)
- Cosipara stereostigma (Dyar, 1918)
- Cosipara tricolor (Zeller, 1872)
- Cosipara tricoloralis (Dyar, 1904)
