= Iranarpia silacealis =

Scientific classification
- Kingdom: Animalia
- Phylum: Arthropoda
- Class: Insecta
- Order: Lepidoptera
- Family: Crambidae
- Genus: Iranarpia
- Species: I. silacealis

Binomial name
- Iranarpia silacealis (Amsel, 1951)

Synonyms
- Witlesia silacealis Amsel, 1951

Species of moth

Iranarpia silacealis is a moth in the family Crambidae. It was described by Hans Georg Amsel in 1951. It is found in Iran.
