= Cosipara chiricahuae =

Scientific classification
- Domain: Eukaryota
- Kingdom: Animalia
- Phylum: Arthropoda
- Class: Insecta
- Order: Lepidoptera
- Family: Crambidae
- Genus: Cosipara
- Species: C. chiricahuae

Binomial name
- Cosipara chiricahuae Munroe, 1972

Species of moth

Cosipara chiricahuae is a moth in the family Crambidae. It was described by Eugene G. Munroe in 1972. It is found in North America, where it has been recorded from Arizona.
