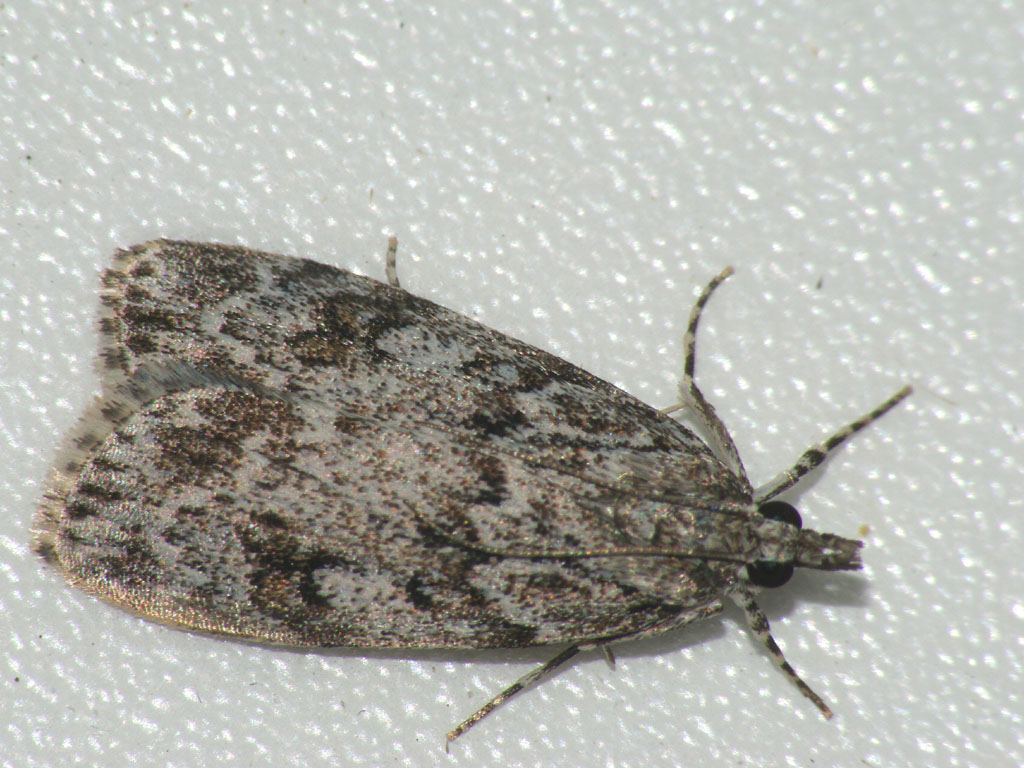
- Scoparia sp.

Scientific classification
- Domain: Eukaryota
- Kingdom: Animalia
- Phylum: Arthropoda
- Class: Insecta
- Order: Lepidoptera
- Family: Crambidae
- Subfamily: Scopariinae; Guenée, 1854

Synonyms
- Eudoraeina Selys-Longchamps, 1844

= Scopariinae =

Subfamily of moths

Scopariinae is a subfamily of the lepidopteran family Crambidae. The subfamily was described by Achille Guenée in 1854.

== Genera ==
- Afrarpia Maes, 2004
- Afroscoparia Nuss, 2003
- Anarpia Chapman, 1912
- Antiscopa Munroe, 1964
- Caradjaina Leraut, 1986
- Cholius Guenée, 1845
- Cosipara Munroe, 1972
- Dasyscopa Meyrick, 1894
- Davana Walker, 1859
- Dipleurinodes Leraut, 1989
- Elusia Schaus, 1940
- Eudipleurina Leraut, 1989
- Eudonia Billberg, 1820 (= Boiea Zetterstedt, 1839, Borea Stephens, 1852, Dipleurina Chapman, 1912, Dipluerina Sharp, 1913, Malageudonia Leraut, 1989, Vietteina Leraut, 1989, Witlesia Chapman, 1912, Wittlesia Chapman, 1912)
- Gesneria Hübner, 1825 (= Scoparona Chapman, 1912)
- Gibeauxia Leraut, 1988
- Helenoscoparia Nuss, 1999
- Hoenia Leraut, 1986
- Iranarpia Leraut, 1982
- Micraglossa Warren, 1891 (= Microglossa Hampson, 1907)
- Notocrambus Turner, 1922
- Pagmanella Leraut, 1985
- Scoparia Haworth, 1811 (= Epileucia Stephens, 1852, Eudorea J. Curtis, 1827, Eudoria Chapman, 1912, Eudoroea Bruand, 1851, Phegea Gistel, 1848, Scopea Haworth, 1828, Sineudonia Leraut, 1986, Tetraprosopus Butler, 1882, Xeroscopa Meyrick, 1884)
- Syrianarpia Leraut, 1982
- Toulgoetodes Leraut, 1988
