= Cosipara smithi =

Scientific classification
- Domain: Eukaryota
- Kingdom: Animalia
- Phylum: Arthropoda
- Class: Insecta
- Order: Lepidoptera
- Family: Crambidae
- Genus: Cosipara
- Species: C. smithi

Binomial name
- Cosipara smithi (H. Druce, 1896)

Synonyms
- Scoparia smithi H. Druce, 1896; Scoparia sabura H. Druce, 1896

Species of moth

Cosipara smithi is a moth in the family Crambidae. It was described by Herbert Druce in 1896. It is found in Mexico.

The forewings are silvery grey to brown. The hindwings are creamy white, the outer margin edged with pale brown.
