= Micraglossa nana =

Scientific classification
- Kingdom: Animalia
- Phylum: Arthropoda
- Clade: Pancrustacea
- Class: Insecta
- Order: Lepidoptera
- Family: Crambidae
- Genus: Micraglossa
- Species: M. nana

Binomial name
- Micraglossa nana W.-C. Li, H.-H. Li & Nuss, 2010

Species of moth

Micraglossa nana is a moth in the family Crambidae. It was described by Wei-Chun Li, Hou-Hun Li and Matthias Nuss in 2010. It is found in China (Guizhou, Zhejiang, Guangxi) and Vietnam.
