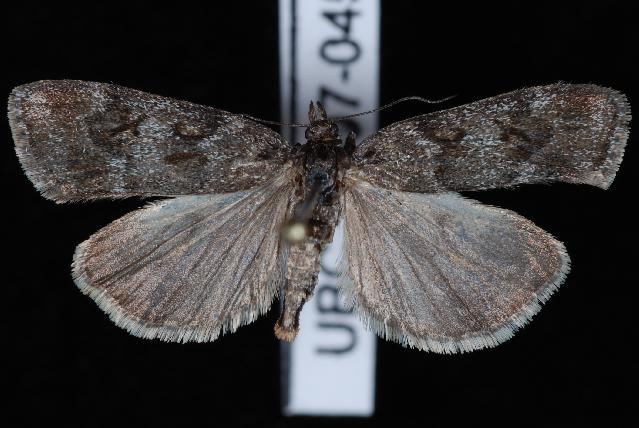
- Gesneria centuriella

Scientific classification
- Domain: Eukaryota
- Kingdom: Animalia
- Phylum: Arthropoda
- Class: Insecta
- Order: Lepidoptera
- Family: Crambidae
- Subfamily: Scopariinae
- Genus: Gesneria; Hübner, 1825

Synonyms
- Scoparona Chapman, 1912

= Gesneria (moth) =

Genus of moths

Gesneria is a genus of moths of the family Crambidae.

== Species ==
- Gesneria centuriella (Denis & Schiffermüller, 1775)
- Gesneria rindgeorum Munroe, 1972
