= Gibeauxia =

Scientific classification
- Kingdom: Animalia
- Phylum: Arthropoda
- Class: Insecta
- Order: Lepidoptera
- Family: Crambidae
- Subfamily: Scopariinae
- Genus: Gibeauxia; Leraut, 1988
- Species: G. gibeauxi

Binomial name
- Gibeauxia gibeauxi Leraut, 1988

Genus of moths

Gibeauxia is a genus of moths of the family Crambidae. It contains only one species, Gibeauxia gibeauxi, which is found in French Guiana.
