= Cholius leucopeplalis =

Scientific classification
- Kingdom: Animalia
- Phylum: Arthropoda
- Class: Insecta
- Order: Lepidoptera
- Family: Crambidae
- Genus: Cholius
- Species: C. leucopeplalis

Binomial name
- Cholius leucopeplalis (Hampson, 1900)

Synonyms
- Pionea leucopeplalis Hampson, 1900

Species of moth

Cholius leucopeplalis is a species of moth in the family Crambidae. It is found in Uzbekistan.
