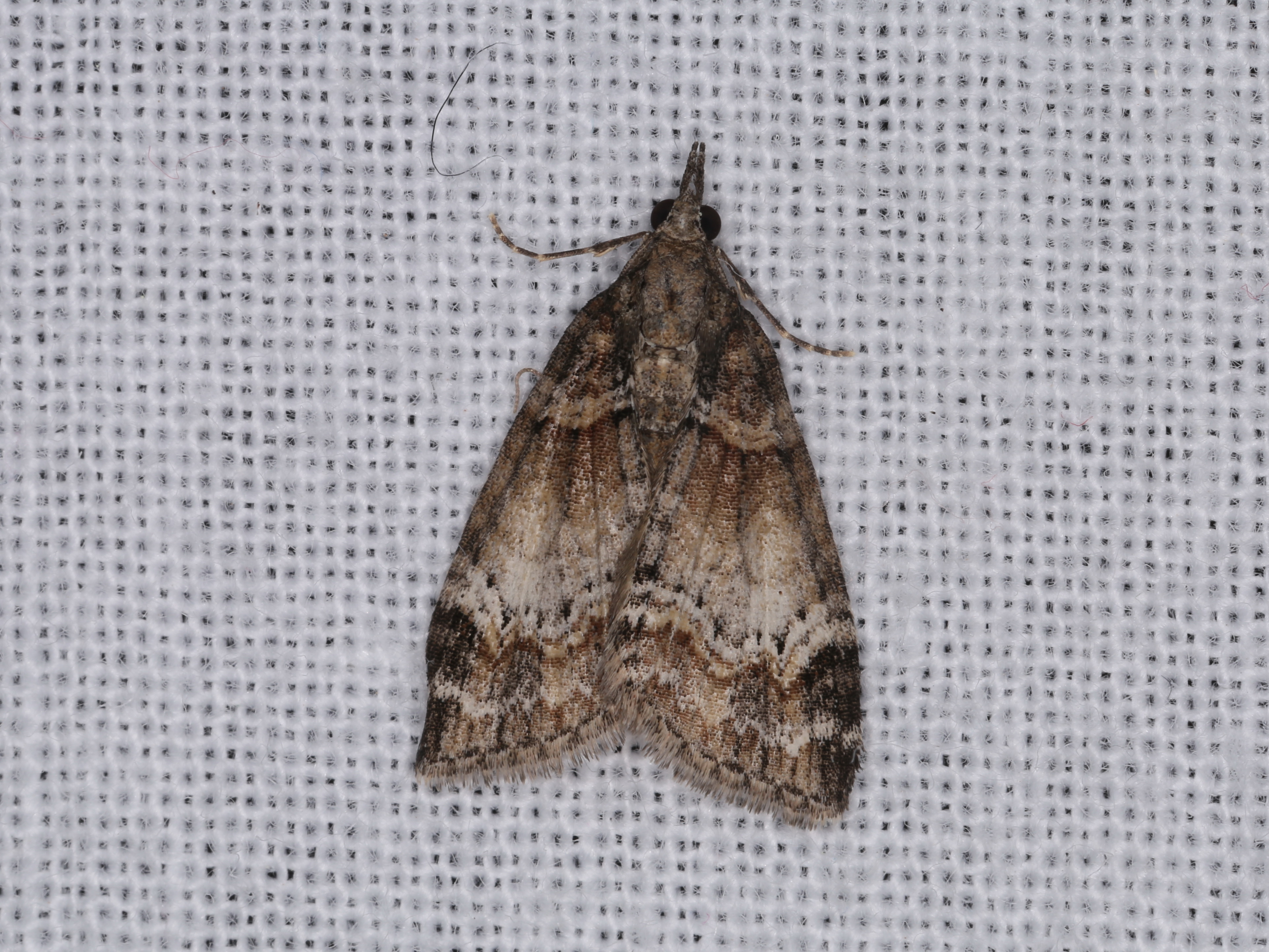

Scientific classification
- Kingdom: Animalia
- Phylum: Arthropoda
- Clade: Pancrustacea
- Class: Insecta
- Order: Lepidoptera
- Family: Geometridae
- Genus: Microdes
- Species: M. diplodonta

Binomial name
- Microdes diplodonta Turner, 1904

= Microdes diplodonta =

Species of moth

Microdes diplodonta is a moth in the family Geometridae. It is endemic to Australia, including Tasmania.
