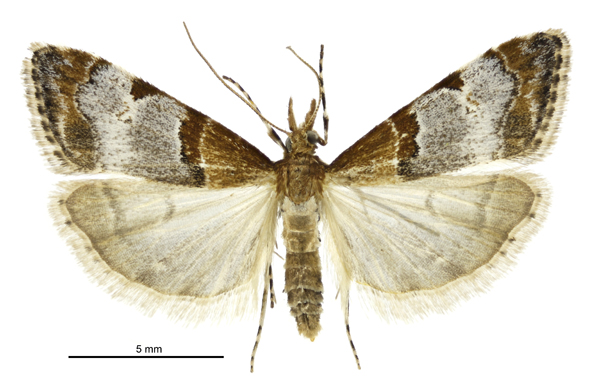
- Female Antiscopa epicomia

Scientific classification
- Kingdom: Animalia
- Phylum: Arthropoda
- Class: Insecta
- Order: Lepidoptera
- Family: Crambidae
- Subfamily: Scopariinae
- Genus: Antiscopa; Munroe, 1964

Type species
- Antiscopa epicomia

= Antiscopa =

Genus of moths

Antiscopa is a genus of moths of the family Crambidae. It was first described by Eugene Munroe in 1964. This genus is endemic to New Zealand. The type species of this genus is Antiscopa epicomia.

== Species ==
This genus contains the following species:

- Antiscopa acompa (Meyrick, 1884)
- Antiscopa elaphra (Meyrick, 1884)
- Antiscopa epicomia (Meyrick, 1884)
