= Pagmanella =

Scientific classification
- Kingdom: Animalia
- Phylum: Arthropoda
- Clade: Pancrustacea
- Class: Insecta
- Order: Lepidoptera
- Family: Crambidae
- Subfamily: Scopariinae
- Genus: Pagmanella; Leraut, 1985
- Species: P. heroica

Binomial name
- Pagmanella heroica Leraut, 1985

Genus of moths

Pagmanella is a genus of moths of the family Crambidae. It contains only one species, Pagmanella heroica, which is found in Afghanistan.
