= Micraglossa aureata =

Scientific classification
- Kingdom: Animalia
- Phylum: Arthropoda
- Class: Insecta
- Order: Lepidoptera
- Family: Crambidae
- Genus: Micraglossa
- Species: M. aureata

Binomial name
- Micraglossa aureata Inoue, 1982

Synonyms
- Micraglossa aurata

Species of moth

Micraglossa aureata is a moth in the family Crambidae. It was described by Hiroshi Inoue in 1982. It is found in Taiwan and Japan.

The length of the forewings is 4.5–5 mm for males and about 5 mm for females. The ground colour of the forewings is golden-yellow, suffused with pale brown scales on the basal and medial areas. The antemedian, postmedian and subterminal lines are golden.

Larvae have been found on Trachycystis microphylla, Plagiochila sciophila and Radula japonica and a larva have been reported feeding on Plagiochila sciophila.
