= Notocrambus cuprealis =

Scientific classification
- Kingdom: Animalia
- Phylum: Arthropoda
- Class: Insecta
- Order: Lepidoptera
- Family: Crambidae
- Genus: Notocrambus
- Species: N. cuprealis

Binomial name
- Notocrambus cuprealis (Hampson, 1907)

Synonyms
- Eclipsiodes cuprealis Hampson, 1907

Species of moth

Notocrambus cuprealis is a moth in the family Crambidae. It was described by George Hampson in 1907. It is found in Australia, where it has been recorded from Victoria.

The wingspan is about 24 mm. The forewings are dark cupreous brown with a slight dark irroration (speckling). There is a faint diffused dark discoidal spot and a faint dark terminal line. The hindwings are cupreous brown with a greyish tinge.
