= Elusia =

Scientific classification
- Kingdom: Animalia
- Phylum: Arthropoda
- Class: Insecta
- Order: Lepidoptera
- Family: Crambidae
- Subfamily: Scopariinae
- Genus: Elusia; Schaus, 1940
- Species: E. enalis

Binomial name
- Elusia enalis Schaus, 1940

Genus of moths

Elusia is a monotypic moth genus of the family Crambidae described by William Schaus in 1940. Its only species, Elusia enalis, described in the same publication, is found in Puerto Rico.
