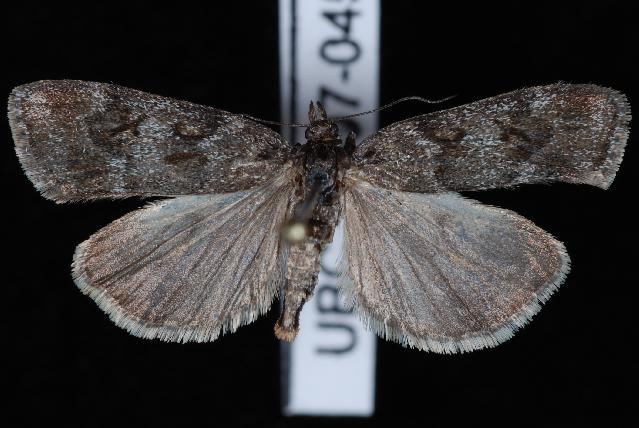

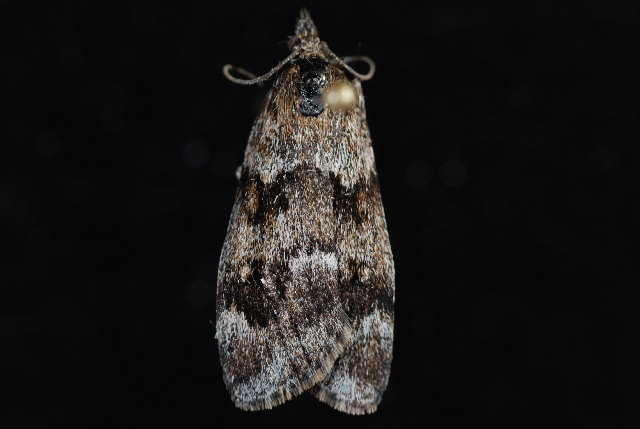

Scientific classification
- Domain: Eukaryota
- Kingdom: Animalia
- Phylum: Arthropoda
- Class: Insecta
- Order: Lepidoptera
- Family: Crambidae
- Genus: Gesneria
- Species: G. centuriella

Binomial name
- Gesneria centuriella (Denis & Schiffermuller, 1775)

Synonyms
- Tinea centuriella Denis & Schiffermuller, 1775; Gesneria centuriella beringiella Munroe, 1972; Eudorea centuriella borealis Duponchel in Lefebvre, 1836; Hypena centuriella caecalis Walker, 1859; Scoparia centuriella ninguidalis Hulst, 1886; Phycis quadratella Zetterstedt, 1839; Scoparia centuriella sachalinensis Matsumura, 1925; Scoparia centurialis Guenée, 1854; Scoparia centuriella ab. obscura Caradja, 1916; Scoparia centuriella f. confluella Krulikovsky, 1908; Scopula caliginosalis Walker, 1866; Scopula numeralis Zetterstedt, 1839

= Gesneria centuriella =

Species of moth

Gesneria centuriella is a species of moth in the family Crambidae described by Michael Denis and Ignaz Schiffermüller in 1775. It is found from Europe (Fennoscandia, Estonia, Russia, Poland, Slovakia, the Czech Republic, Hungary, Romania, Bulgaria, Germany, Austria, Switzerland, Italy, France, Iceland), east to Japan. It is also present in Greenland and northern North America.

The wingspan is 20–30 mm. The forewings are smoky gray to dark brown. Adults are on wing from mid June to July in North America.

== Subspecies ==
- Gesneria centuriella centuriella (Eurasia)
- Gesneria centuriella beringiella Munroe, 1972 (Alaska to British Columbia)
- Gesneria centuriella borealis (Duponchel, 1835) (Greenland)
- Gesneria centuriella caecalis (Walker, [1859]) (Alaska and Canada to New York, Massachusetts, Oregon, Idaho)
- Gesneria centuriella ninguidalis (Hulst, 1886) (Arizona, Colorado, Wyoming, Montana)
