= Microdes arcuata =

Scientific classification
- Domain: Eukaryota
- Kingdom: Animalia
- Phylum: Arthropoda
- Class: Insecta
- Order: Lepidoptera
- Family: Geometridae
- Genus: Microdes
- Species: M. arcuata

Binomial name
- Microdes arcuata C. Swinhoe, 1902

Species of moth

Microdes arcuata is a moth in the family Geometridae first described by Charles Swinhoe in 1902. It is found in Australia (including South Australia, the type location).
