= Microdes typhopa =

Scientific classification
- Kingdom: Animalia
- Phylum: Arthropoda
- Clade: Pancrustacea
- Class: Insecta
- Order: Lepidoptera
- Family: Geometridae
- Genus: Microdes
- Species: M. typhopa

Binomial name
- Microdes typhopa Lower, 1897

Species of moth

Microdes typhopa is a moth in the family Geometridae. It is found in Australia (including South Australia, the type location).
