= Micraglossa beia =

Scientific classification
- Kingdom: Animalia
- Phylum: Arthropoda
- Clade: Pancrustacea
- Class: Insecta
- Order: Lepidoptera
- Family: Crambidae
- Genus: Micraglossa
- Species: M. beia

Binomial name
- Micraglossa beia W.-C. Li, H.-H. Li & Nuss, 2010

Species of moth

Micraglossa beia is a moth in the family Crambidae. It was described by Wei-Chun Li, Hou-Hun Li and Matthias Nuss in 2010. It is found in China (Xizang, Sichuan, Guizhou, Henan, Hubei, Fujian, Gansu, Zhejiang, Guangxi).

The length of the forewings is 6–8 mm for males and 6–8.5 mm for females.
