= Micraglossa manoi =

Scientific classification
- Domain: Eukaryota
- Kingdom: Animalia
- Phylum: Arthropoda
- Class: Insecta
- Order: Lepidoptera
- Family: Crambidae
- Genus: Micraglossa
- Species: M. manoi

Binomial name
- Micraglossa manoi Sasaki, 1998

Species of moth

Micraglossa manoi is a moth in the family Crambidae. It was described by Sasaki in 1998. It is found in Taiwan, China (Guizhou) and Nepal. It is found at altitudes above 1,600 meters.

The length of the forewings is 6.5–8 mm for males and 6.5–8 mm for females.
