= Cholius luteolaris =

Scientific classification
- Kingdom: Animalia
- Phylum: Arthropoda
- Class: Insecta
- Order: Lepidoptera
- Family: Crambidae
- Genus: Cholius
- Species: C. luteolaris

Binomial name
- Cholius luteolaris (Scopoli, 1772)

Synonyms
- Phalaena luteolaris Scopoli, 1772; Scoparia luteolaris; Pionea luteolaris albescentalis Hampson, 1900; Cholius ochrealis cremealis Zerny, 1934; Tinea luteellus var. flavellus Costa, 1836; Pyralis ochrealis Denis & Schiffermüller, 1775; Tinea silacella Hübner, 1796; Tinea simplicella La Harpe, 1861

Species of moth

Cholius luteolaris is a species of moth in the family Crambidae. It is found in France, Spain, Italy, Slovenia, Austria, the Czech Republic, Slovakia, Hungary, Croatia, Bosnia and Herzegovina, Romania, Bulgaria, the Republic of Macedonia, Greece, Turkey and Lebanon.

Adults have uniform ochreous coloured forewings.

== Subspecies ==
- Cholius luteolaris luteolaris
- Cholius luteolaris albescentalis (Hampson, 1900) (Turkey)
