= Dasyscopa barbipennis =

Scientific classification
- Kingdom: Animalia
- Phylum: Arthropoda
- Class: Insecta
- Order: Lepidoptera
- Family: Crambidae
- Genus: Dasyscopa
- Species: D. barbipennis

Binomial name
- Dasyscopa barbipennis (Hampson, 1897)

Synonyms
- Scoparia barbipennis Hampson, 1897

Species of moth

Dasyscopa barbipennis is a moth in the family Crambidae. It was described by George Hampson in 1897. It is found on Peninsular Malaysia.

The wingspan is about 17 mm. The forewings are ferruginous brown, irrorated (sprinkled) with grey and white scales. There is a curved antemedial line with black marks on its outer edge, as well as a discocellular black spot, surrounded by some white scales. The postmedial and submarginal lines consist of white scales. The hindwings are yellowish white.
