= Micraglossa straminealis =

Scientific classification
- Kingdom: Animalia
- Phylum: Arthropoda
- Class: Insecta
- Order: Lepidoptera
- Family: Crambidae
- Genus: Micraglossa
- Species: M. straminealis

Binomial name
- Micraglossa straminealis (Hampson, 1903)

Synonyms
- Scoparia straminealis Hampson, 1903

Species of moth

Micraglossa straminealis is a moth in the family Crambidae. It was described by George Hampson in 1903. It is found in India, Nepal and Sichuan, China.

The length of the forewings is about 6 mm for males and 7 mm for females.
