= Micraglossa oenealis =

Scientific classification
- Kingdom: Animalia
- Phylum: Arthropoda
- Class: Insecta
- Order: Lepidoptera
- Family: Crambidae
- Genus: Micraglossa
- Species: M. oenealis

Binomial name
- Micraglossa oenealis Hampson, 1897

Synonyms
- Micraglossa aenealis

Species of moth

Micraglossa oenealis is a moth in the family Crambidae. It was described by George Hampson in 1897. It is found in India, Taiwan, Nepal and Guizhou, China.

The length of the forewings is 4.5–5 mm for males and females. The ground colour of the forewings is golden, suffused with black scales. There are two yellow spots on the basal area, followed by a golden band. The antemedian, postmedian and subterminal lines are golden.
