= Iranarpia =

Scientific classification
- Kingdom: Animalia
- Phylum: Arthropoda
- Class: Insecta
- Order: Lepidoptera
- Family: Crambidae
- Subfamily: Scopariinae
- Genus: Iranarpia; Leraut, 1982

Genus of moths

Iranarpia is a genus of moths of the family Crambidae.

== Species ==
- Iranarpia albalis (Amsel, 1961)
- Iranarpia silacealis (Amsel, 1951)
