= Micraglossa cupritincta =

Scientific classification
- Kingdom: Animalia
- Phylum: Arthropoda
- Class: Insecta
- Order: Lepidoptera
- Family: Crambidae
- Genus: Micraglossa
- Species: M. cupritincta

Binomial name
- Micraglossa cupritincta Hampson, 1917

Species of moth

Micraglossa cupritincta is a moth in the family Crambidae. It was described by George Hampson in 1917. It is found on New Guinea.
