= Caradjaina =

Scientific classification
- Kingdom: Animalia
- Phylum: Arthropoda
- Class: Insecta
- Order: Lepidoptera
- Family: Crambidae
- Subfamily: Scopariinae
- Genus: Caradjaina; Leraut, 1986
- Species: C. kwangtungialis

Binomial name
- Caradjaina kwangtungialis (Caradja, 1925)

Synonyms
- Scoparia ambigualis kwangtungialis Caradja, 1925

Genus of moths

Caradjaina is a genus of moths of the family Crambidae. It contains only one species, Caradjaina kwangtungialis, which is found in China (Guangdong).
