= Microdes decora =

Scientific classification
- Kingdom: Animalia
- Phylum: Arthropoda
- Clade: Pancrustacea
- Class: Insecta
- Order: Lepidoptera
- Family: Geometridae
- Genus: Microdes
- Species: M. decora

Binomial name
- Microdes decora Turner, 1942

Species of moth

Microdes decora is a moth in the family Geometridae. It is found in Australia (including South Australia, the type location).
