= Dasyscopa homogenes =

Scientific classification
- Domain: Eukaryota
- Kingdom: Animalia
- Phylum: Arthropoda
- Class: Insecta
- Order: Lepidoptera
- Family: Crambidae
- Genus: Dasyscopa
- Species: D. homogenes

Binomial name
- Dasyscopa homogenes Meyrick, 1894

Synonyms
- Scoparia planilinealis Warren, 1896

Species of moth

Dasyscopa homogenes is a moth in the family Crambidae. It was described by Edward Meyrick in 1894. It is found in India and on Sumbawa in Indonesia.

The wingspan is about 16 mm. The forewings are pale grey, mixed with whitish and sprinkled with blackish. There are two white lines and two small blackish dots, as well as a blackish discal spot and a whitish subterminal line. The hindwings are pale grey.
