= Anarpia =

Scientific classification
- Kingdom: Animalia
- Phylum: Arthropoda
- Class: Insecta
- Order: Lepidoptera
- Family: Crambidae
- Subfamily: Scopariinae
- Genus: Anarpia; Chapman, 1912

Genus of moths

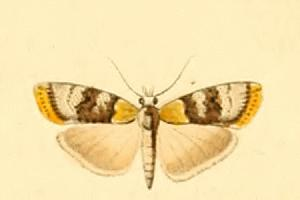
Illustration of Anarpia incertalis

Anarpia is a genus of moths of the family Crambidae.

== Species ==
- Anarpia incertalis (Duponchel, 1832)
- Anarpia iranella (Zerny, 1939)
