= Hoenia =

Scientific classification
- Kingdom: Animalia
- Phylum: Arthropoda
- Class: Insecta
- Order: Lepidoptera
- Family: Crambidae
- Subfamily: Scopariinae
- Genus: Hoenia; Leraut, 1986
- Species: H. sinensis

Binomial name
- Hoenia sinensis Leraut, 1986

Genus of moths

Hoenia is a genus of moths of the family Crambidae. It contains only one species, Hoenia sinensis, which is found in China (Zhejiang).
