= Micraglossa scoparialis =

Scientific classification
- Domain: Eukaryota
- Kingdom: Animalia
- Phylum: Arthropoda
- Class: Insecta
- Order: Lepidoptera
- Family: Crambidae
- Genus: Micraglossa
- Species: M. scoparialis

Binomial name
- Micraglossa scoparialis Warren, 1891

Species of moth

Micraglossa scoparialis is a moth in the family Crambidae. It was described by Warren in 1891. It is found in China (Shaanxi, Sichuan, Xizang, Hubei, Guizhou, Yunnan), Pakistan, Nepal and Vietnam.

The length of the forewings is 5–6 mm for males and 5–7 mm for females.
