= Cosipara tricolor =

Scientific classification
- Kingdom: Animalia
- Phylum: Arthropoda
- Clade: Pancrustacea
- Class: Insecta
- Order: Lepidoptera
- Family: Crambidae
- Genus: Cosipara
- Species: C. tricolor

Binomial name
- Cosipara tricolor (Zeller, 1872)

Synonyms
- Scoparia tricolor Zeller, 1872

Species of moth

Cosipara tricolor is a moth in the family Crambidae. It was described by Zeller in 1872. It is found in Colombia.
