= Cosipara flexuosa =

Scientific classification
- Kingdom: Animalia
- Phylum: Arthropoda
- Class: Insecta
- Order: Lepidoptera
- Family: Crambidae
- Genus: Cosipara
- Species: C. flexuosa

Binomial name
- Cosipara flexuosa (Dyar, 1918)

Synonyms
- Scoparia flexuosa Dyar, 1918

Species of moth

Cosipara flexuosa is a moth in the family Crambidae. It was described by Harrison Gray Dyar Jr. in 1918. It is found in Chiapas, Mexico.

The wingspan is about 24 mm. Adults have been recorded on wing in May.
