= Cosipara stereostigma =

Scientific classification
- Kingdom: Animalia
- Phylum: Arthropoda
- Class: Insecta
- Order: Lepidoptera
- Family: Crambidae
- Genus: Cosipara
- Species: C. stereostigma

Binomial name
- Cosipara stereostigma (Dyar, 1918)

Synonyms
- Scoparia stereostigma Dyar, 1918

Species of moth

Cosipara stereostigma is a moth in the family Crambidae. It was described by Harrison Gray Dyar Jr. in 1918. It is found in Xalapa and Orizaba, Mexico and Guatemala.

The wingspan is about 12 mm. The forewings are grey, irrorated (sprinkled) with blackish. There is a dark mark at the base, as well as whitish inner line, followed by a blackish shade. The hindwings are sordid whitish, but darker on the edge. Adults have been recorded on wing in July.
