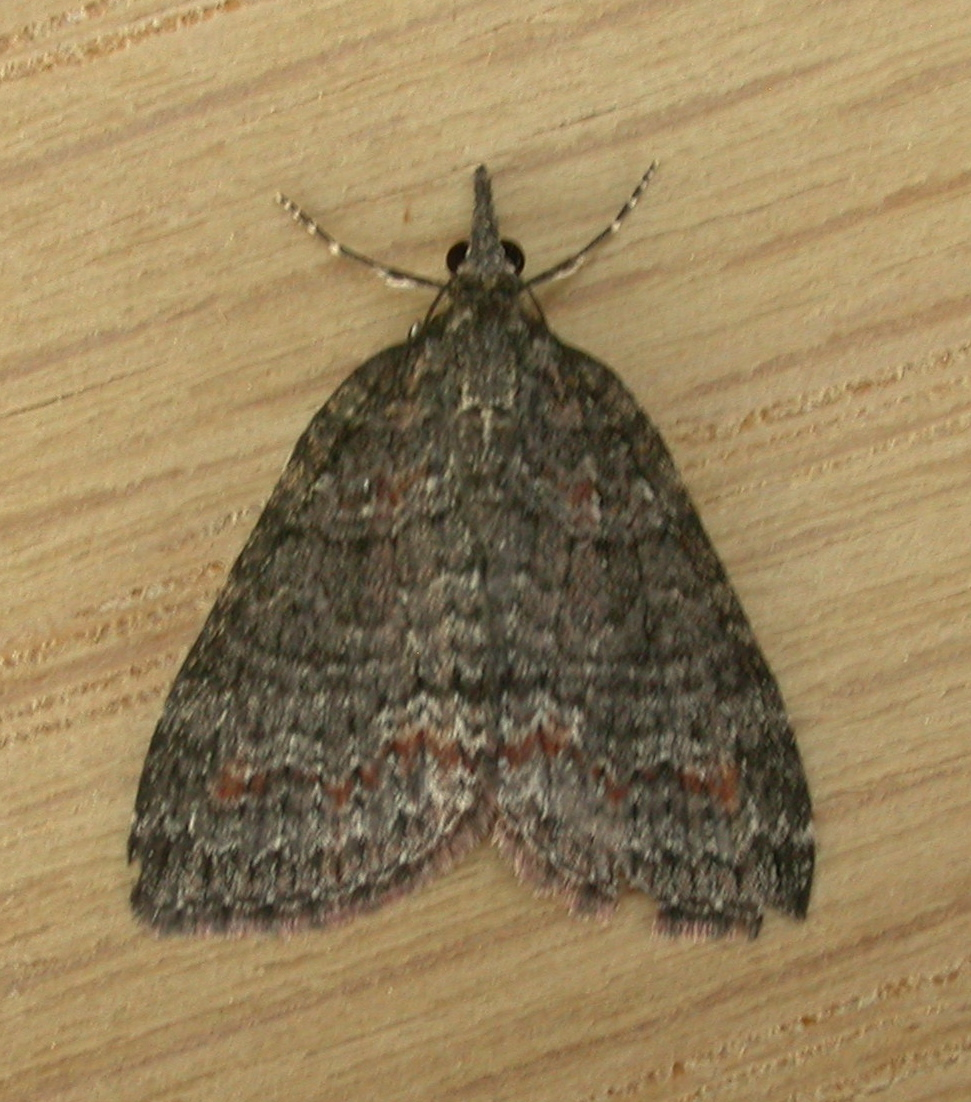

Scientific classification
- Kingdom: Animalia
- Phylum: Arthropoda
- Class: Insecta
- Order: Lepidoptera
- Family: Geometridae
- Genus: Microdes
- Species: M. squamulata

Binomial name
- Microdes squamulata Guenée, 1857

Synonyms
- Microdes sitellata Guenée, 1858; Oesymna stipataria Walker, 1869

= Microdes squamulata =

Species of moth

Microdes squamulata is a species of moth of the family Geometridae. It is found in Australia, including Tasmania.
