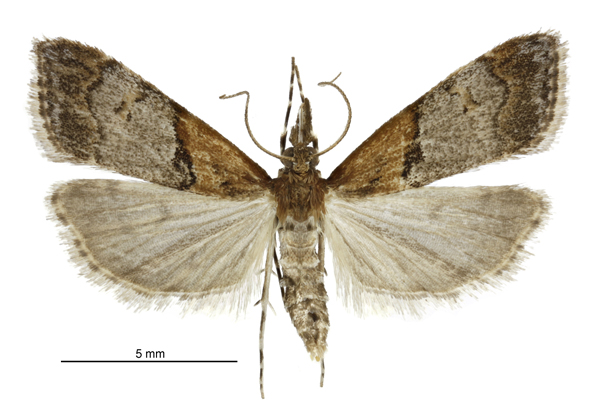
- Female
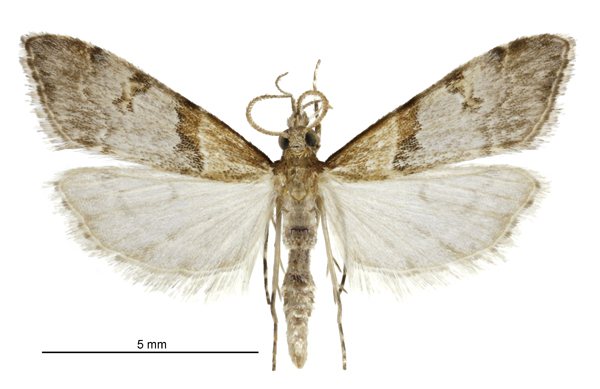
- Male

Scientific classification
- Kingdom: Animalia
- Phylum: Arthropoda
- Class: Insecta
- Order: Lepidoptera
- Family: Crambidae
- Genus: Antiscopa
- Species: A. epicomia

Binomial name
- Antiscopa epicomia (Meyrick, 1884)

Synonyms
- Scoparia epicomia Meyrick, 1884

= Antiscopa epicomia =

Species of moth endemic to New Zealand

Antiscopa epicomia is a moth in the family Crambidae. This species was first described by Edward Meyrick. It is endemic to New Zealand and can be found throughout the country including on Auckland Island, Campbell Island, and the Kermadec Islands. It inhabits native forest, preferring damp, shaded forest ravines. Adults are variable in size and colouration and are on the wing all year but most frequently from October until March.

== Taxonomy ==
It was described by Edward Meyrick in 1884 from specimens collected amongst native bush in January and obtained near Arthur's Pass and Dunedin and named Scoparia epicomia. In 1928 George Hudson discussed and illustrated this species in his book The butterflies and moths of New Zealand. In 1964 E. Munroe placed this species in the genus Antiscopa. This placement was followed by J. S. Dugdale in 1988. The male lectotype, collected in Dunedin, is held at the Natural History Museum, London.

== Description ==
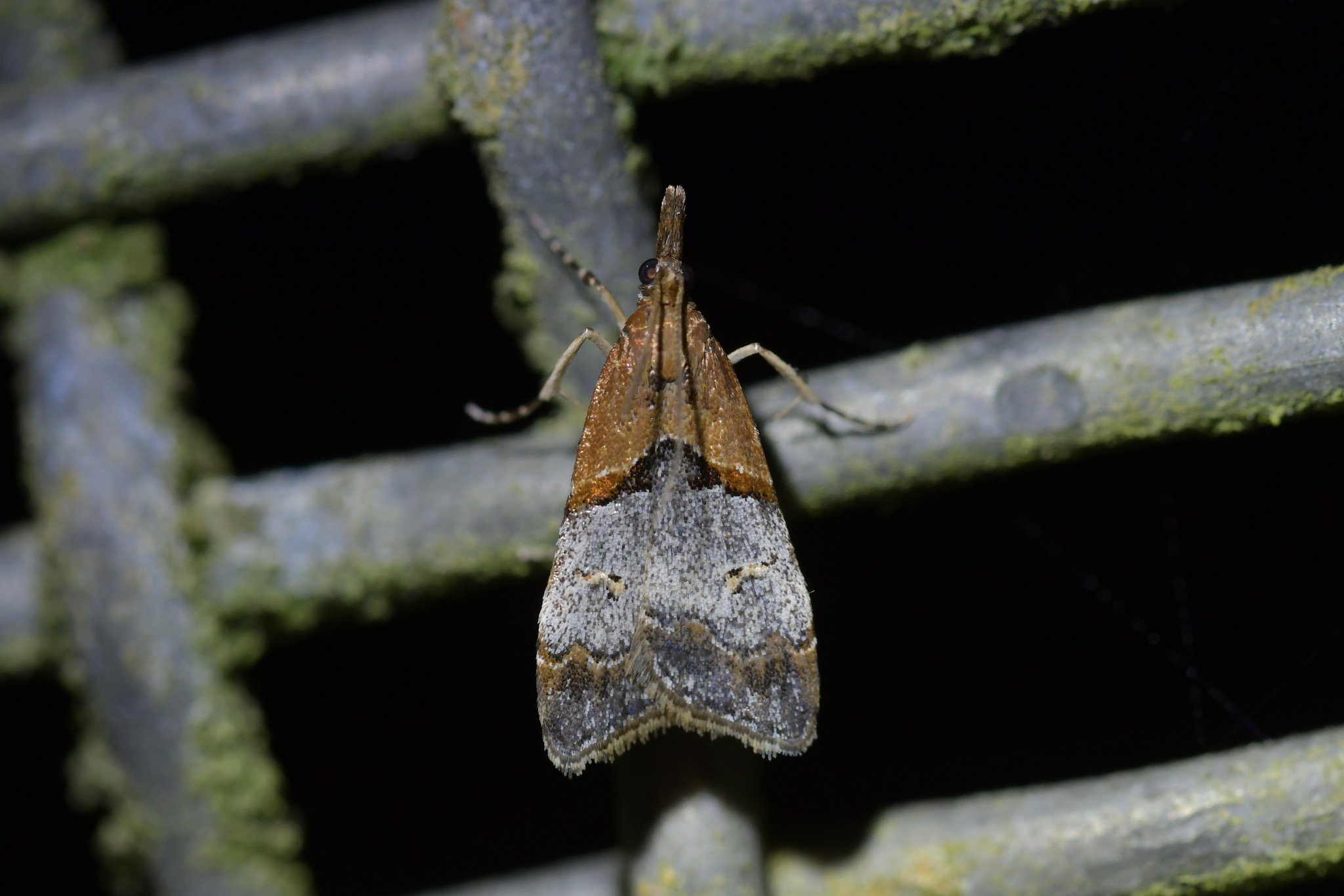
A. epicomia observed in Wellington.

The wingspan is 18–19 mm. The forewings are pale light ochreous grey, but the basal third is reddish-ochreous brown. The hindwings are pale whitish grey with a light grey lunule, postmedian line and submarginal band.

This species varies in size as well as in the colour and intensity of its markings. Specimens obtained in the north tend to be brighter marked than those collected in the south of the country. A. epicomia is superficially very similar to S. fimbriata but the latter can be distinguished as the male has antennal pectinations.

== Distribution ==
A. epicomia is endemic to New Zealand. It can be found throughout New Zealand, including on Auckland Island, Campbell Island and on the Kermadec Islands. It has been observed at altitudes ranging from sea-level to 1150m.

== Behaviour ==
Adults have been observed on wing all year but are more frequently seen from October to March. This species is attracted to light as well as UV light.

== Habitat ==
This species inhabits native forest and has been observed in damp, shaded forest ravines.
