= Microdes leptobrya =

Scientific classification
- Domain: Eukaryota
- Kingdom: Animalia
- Phylum: Arthropoda
- Class: Insecta
- Order: Lepidoptera
- Family: Geometridae
- Genus: Microdes
- Species: M. leptobrya

Binomial name
- Microdes leptobrya Turner, 1938

Synonyms
- Microdes phricocrossa Turner, 1939

Species of moth

Microdes leptobrya is a moth in the family Geometridae. It is found in Australia (including Tasmania, the type location).
