= Micraglossa convatalalis =

Scientific classification
- Domain: Eukaryota
- Kingdom: Animalia
- Phylum: Arthropoda
- Class: Insecta
- Order: Lepidoptera
- Family: Crambidae
- Genus: Micraglossa
- Species: M. convatalalis

Binomial name
- Micraglossa convatalalis Klunder van Gijen, 1913

Species of moth

Micraglossa convatalalis is a moth in the family Crambidae. It was described by Klunder van Gijen in 1913. It is found on the Kei Islands.

The wingspan is about 17 mm. The forewings are brown, but yellowish-brown at the base. The hindwings are uniform brown.
