= Cosipara tricoloralis =

Tricolored cosipara moth

Scientific classification
- Domain: Eukaryota
- Kingdom: Animalia
- Phylum: Arthropoda
- Class: Insecta
- Order: Lepidoptera
- Family: Crambidae
- Genus: Cosipara
- Species: C. tricoloralis

Binomial name
- Cosipara tricoloralis (Dyar, 1904)

Synonyms
- Scoparia tricoloralis Dyar, 1904; Scoparia rufitincalis Dyar, 1929

Species of moth

Cosipara tricoloralis, the tricolored cosipara moth, is a moth in the family Crambidae. It was described by Harrison Gray Dyar Jr. in 1904. It is found in North America, where it has been recorded from British Columbia, California, Colorado, Montana, Oregon and Washington.

Adults have been recorded on wing from May to September.
