= Dasyscopa axeli =

Scientific classification
- Kingdom: Animalia
- Phylum: Arthropoda
- Clade: Pancrustacea
- Class: Insecta
- Order: Lepidoptera
- Family: Crambidae
- Genus: Dasyscopa
- Species: D. axeli

Binomial name
- Dasyscopa axeli Nuss, 1998

Species of moth

Dasyscopa axeli is a moth in the family Crambidae. It was described by Nuss in 1998. It is found on Sumatra.
