= Micraglossa zhongguoensis =

Scientific classification
- Kingdom: Animalia
- Phylum: Arthropoda
- Clade: Pancrustacea
- Class: Insecta
- Order: Lepidoptera
- Family: Crambidae
- Genus: Micraglossa
- Species: M. zhongguoensis

Binomial name
- Micraglossa zhongguoensis W.-C. Li, H.-H. Li & Nuss, 2010

Species of moth

Micraglossa zhongguoensis is a species of moth in the family Crambidae. It was described by Wei-Chun Li, Hou-Hun Li and Matthias Nuss in 2010. It is found in China (Shaanxi, Anhui, Jiangsu, Shanghai, Sichuan, Zhejiang, Yunnan, Guizhou, Hunan, Hong Kong) and northern Vietnam.
