= Cosipara modulalis =

Scientific classification
- Kingdom: Animalia
- Phylum: Arthropoda
- Clade: Pancrustacea
- Class: Insecta
- Order: Lepidoptera
- Family: Crambidae
- Genus: Cosipara
- Species: C. modulalis

Binomial name
- Cosipara modulalis Munroe, 1972

Species of moth

Cosipara modulalis is a moth in the family Crambidae. It was described by Eugene G. Munroe in 1972. It is found in North America, where it has been recorded from Arizona and Colorado.

The wingspan is about 20 mm. Adults have been recorded on wing in July and August.
