= Anarpia iranella =

Scientific classification
- Domain: Eukaryota
- Kingdom: Animalia
- Phylum: Arthropoda
- Class: Insecta
- Order: Lepidoptera
- Family: Crambidae
- Genus: Anarpia
- Species: A. iranella

Binomial name
- Anarpia iranella (Zerny, 1939)

Synonyms
- Scoparia phaeoleuca iranella Zerny, 1939; Scoparia alvandella Amsel, 1961

Species of moth

Anarpia iranella is a moth in the family Crambidae. It was described by Zerny in 1939. It is found in Iran.
