= Microdes melanocausta =

Scientific classification
- Kingdom: Animalia
- Phylum: Arthropoda
- Clade: Pancrustacea
- Class: Insecta
- Order: Lepidoptera
- Family: Geometridae
- Genus: Microdes
- Species: M. melanocausta

Binomial name
- Microdes melanocausta Meyrick, 1891

Species of moth

Microdes melanocausta is a moth in the family Geometridae. It is found in Australia (including Tasmania, the type location).
