= Notocrambus =

Scientific classification
- Kingdom: Animalia
- Phylum: Arthropoda
- Class: Insecta
- Order: Lepidoptera
- Family: Crambidae
- Subfamily: Scopariinae
- Genus: Notocrambus; Turner, 1922

Genus of moths

Notocrambus is a genus of moths of the family Crambidae.

== Species ==
- Notocrambus cuprealis (Hampson, 1907)
- Notocrambus holomelas Turner, 1922
