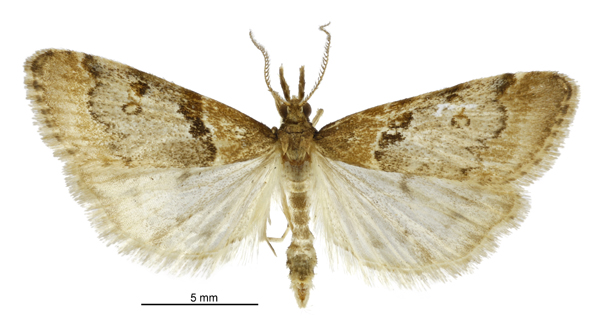
- Male

Scientific classification
- Kingdom: Animalia
- Phylum: Arthropoda
- Class: Insecta
- Order: Lepidoptera
- Family: Crambidae
- Genus: Scoparia
- Species: S. fimbriata

Binomial name
- Scoparia fimbriata Philpott, 1917

= Scoparia fimbriata =

Species of moth

Scoparia fimbriata is a species of moth in the family Crambidae. This species is endemic to New Zealand.

== Taxonomy ==
It was described by Alfred Philpott in 1917. However the placement of this species within the genus Scoparia is in doubt. As a result, this species has also been referred to as Scoparia (s.l.) fimbriata.

== Description ==
The wingspan is about 20 mm. The forewings are pale ochreous-brown, but darker basally. The first line is whitish, margined posteriorly with blackish-brown. The second line is pale, margined anteriorly with blackish-brown. The hindwings are ochreous-grey. The lunule and subterminal line are fuscous. Adults have been recorded on wing in December and January.
