= Cosipara cyclophora =

Scientific classification
- Kingdom: Animalia
- Phylum: Arthropoda
- Clade: Pancrustacea
- Class: Insecta
- Order: Lepidoptera
- Family: Crambidae
- Genus: Cosipara
- Species: C. cyclophora

Binomial name
- Cosipara cyclophora (Dyar, 1918)

Synonyms
- Scoparia cyclophora Dyar, 1918

Species of moth

Cosipara cyclophora is a moth in the family Crambidae. It was described by Harrison Gray Dyar Jr. in 1918. It is found in Zacualpan, Mexico.

The wingspan is about 17 mm. The forewings are purplish grey, irrorated with black. There is a discal mark in the form of a black ring in a red-brown cloud. The hindwings are dirty white, but darker on the edge. Adults have been recorded on wing in May.
