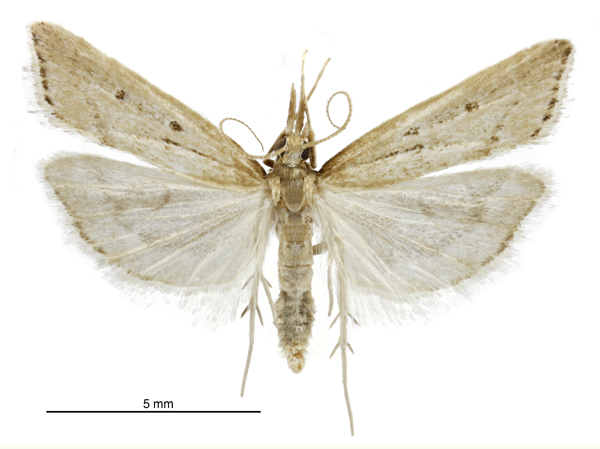
- Male
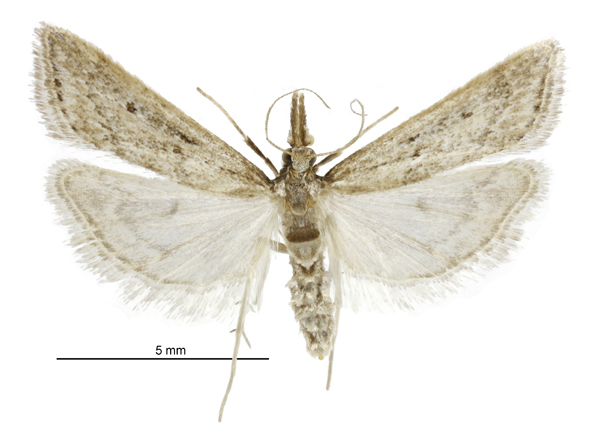
- Female

Scientific classification
- Kingdom: Animalia
- Phylum: Arthropoda
- Clade: Pancrustacea
- Class: Insecta
- Order: Lepidoptera
- Family: Crambidae
- Genus: Antiscopa
- Species: A. elaphra

Binomial name
- Antiscopa elaphra (Meyrick, 1884)

Synonyms
- Scoparia elaphra Meyrick, 1884

= Antiscopa elaphra =

Species of moth, endemic to New Zealand

Antiscopa elaphra is a moth in the family Crambidae. It is endemic to New Zealand and has been observed in both the North and South Islands. Adults of this species are on the wing from August until March and are attracted to light. In 2020 this species had its DNA barcode sequenced.

== Taxonomy ==
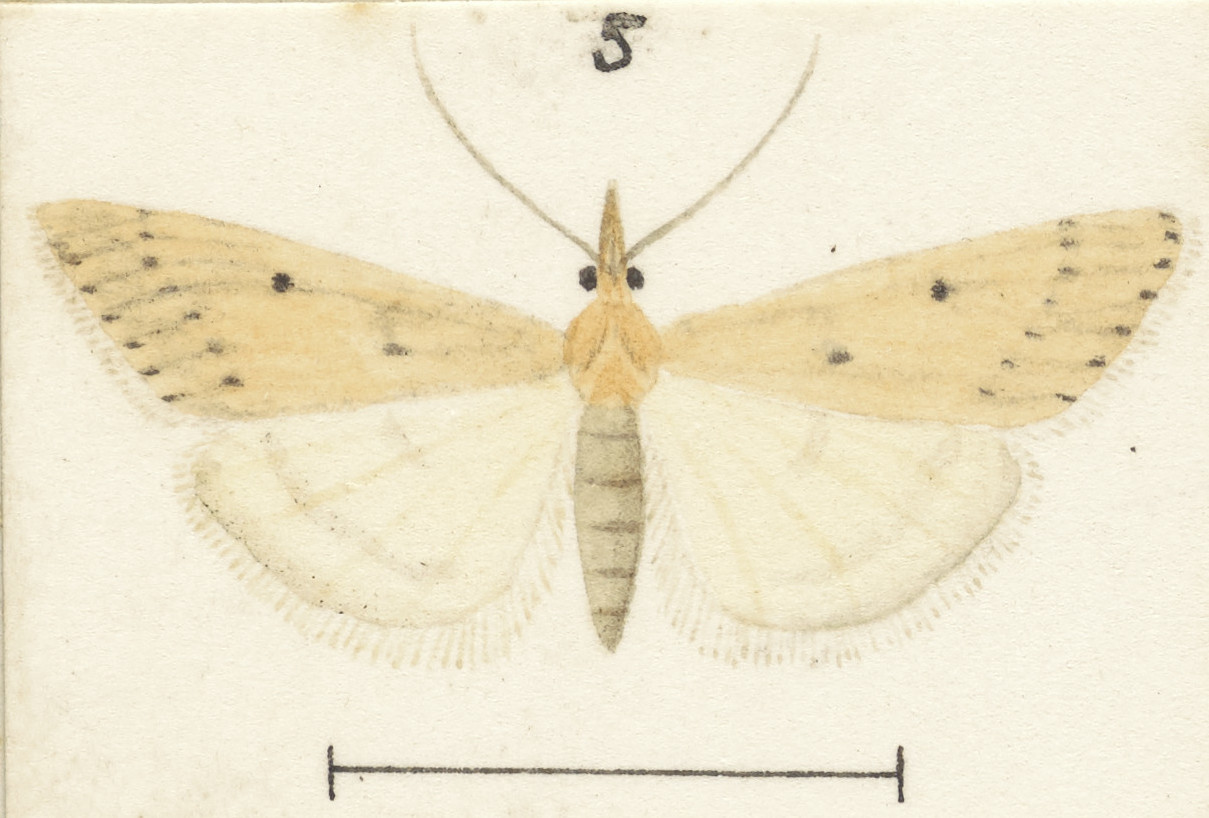
Illustration of species by George Hudson.

This species was first named Scoparia elaphra by Edward Meyrick in 1884. In 1885 Meyrick gave a detailed description of the species using specimens collected near Palmerston North and Christchurch. George Hudson discussed and illustrated this species under the name Scoparia acompa in his 1928 book The butterflies and moths of New Zealand. In 1964 Eugene Munroe placed this species in the genus Antiscopa. This placement was accepted by John S. Dugdale in 1988. The male lectotype, collected in Palmerston North, is held at the Natural History Museum, London.

== Description ==
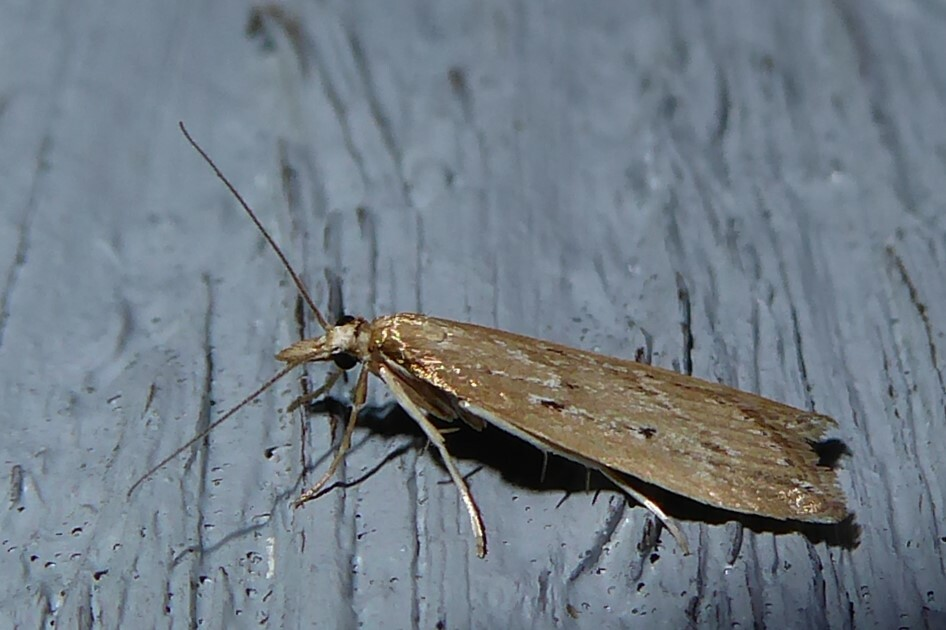
Observation of live A. elaphra.

Meyrick described the adults of this species as follows:

Male, female. — 12-14 mm. Head and thorax pale ochreous mixed with whitish, shoulders narrowly suffused with dark fuscous. Palpi 4 1/2, dark fuscous, white above and beneath. Antennae whitish-ochreous; in male joints serrate with apical teeth only, ciliations 1. Abdomen grey-whitish. Legs white, anterior pair suffused with dark fuscous. Forewings very elongate, narrow, triangular, costa straight, apex round-pointed, hindmargin slightly sinuate, very oblique; pale brownish-ochreous, irregularly irrorated with white on veins, and generally with scattered dark fuscous scales; base of costa rather suffused with dark fuscous; some blackish scales on submedian fold before first line; first line hardly whitish, posteriorly margined with dark fuscous, rather strongly curved; orbicular small, linear, black, touching first line; claviform smaller, similar, generally indistinct; reniform dot-like, blackish; second line obscurely whitish, anteriorly dark-margined, somewhat curved above middle, otherwise straight; a row of blackish dots on hindrnargin; cilia whitish, with two fuscous-grey lines. Hindwings 1 1/3, grey-whitish; lunule, postmedian line and hindrnargin grey; cilia white.

This species can be distinguished from related species in its genus by its small size, long palpi, the sharp, triangular shape of, as well as the simple markings on, its forewings and its overall fragile appearance. In 2020 A. elphra had its DNA barcode sequenced and published.

== Distribution ==
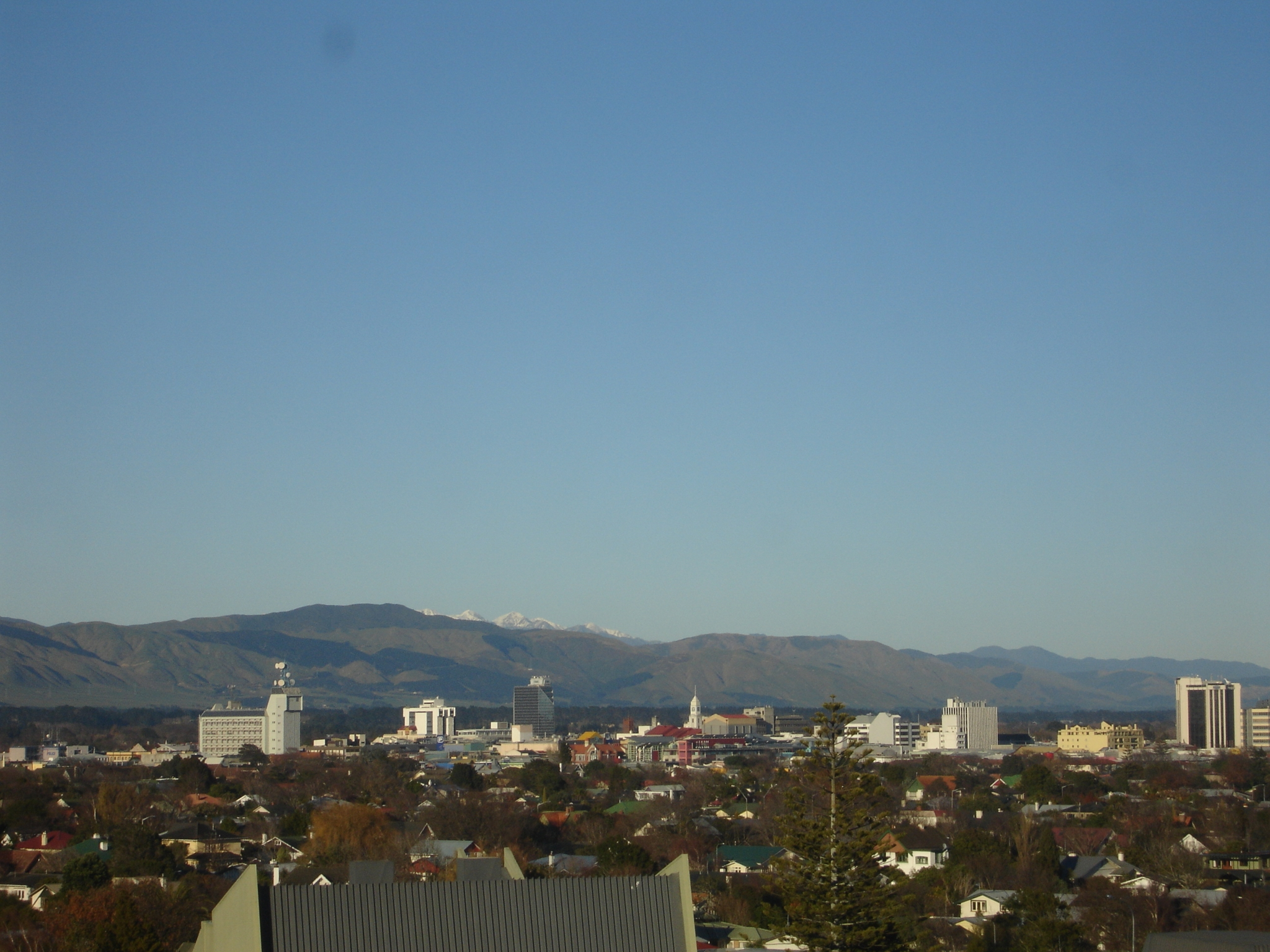
Palmerston North, type locality of A. elaphra.

It is endemic to New Zealand. The species has been observed in both the North and the South Islands.

== Behaviour ==
Hudson stated that adults of this species were on the wing from August until March. Adults have also been recorded on wing in the West Coast from March until September. They are attracted to light and have been collected via a mercury vapour light trap.
