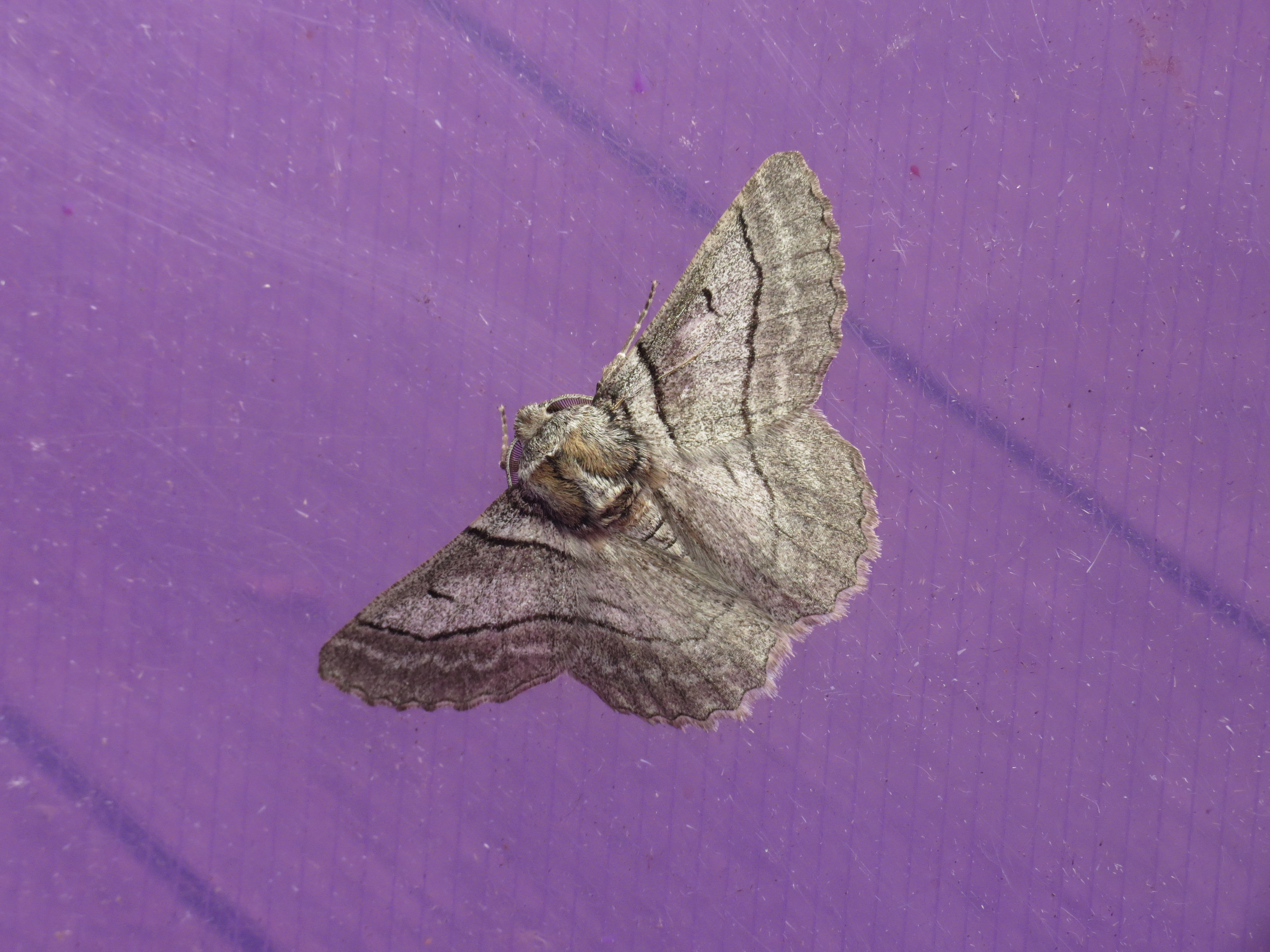
- Hypobapta tachyhalotaria

Scientific classification
- Kingdom: Animalia
- Phylum: Arthropoda
- Clade: Pancrustacea
- Class: Insecta
- Order: Lepidoptera
- Family: Geometridae
- Genus: Hypobapta
- Species: H. tachyhalotaria

Binomial name
- Hypobapta tachyhalotaria Hausmann & Sommerer, 2009

= Hypobapta tachyhalotaria =

Species of moth

Hypobapta tachyhalotaria, also known as varied grey, is a moth of the family Geometridae. This Australian endemic is found in Tasmania and possibly New South Wales and Queensland. Prior to its description, it was confused with Hypobapta percomptaria.

The wingspan is 39–42 mm for males and 44–48 mm for females.
