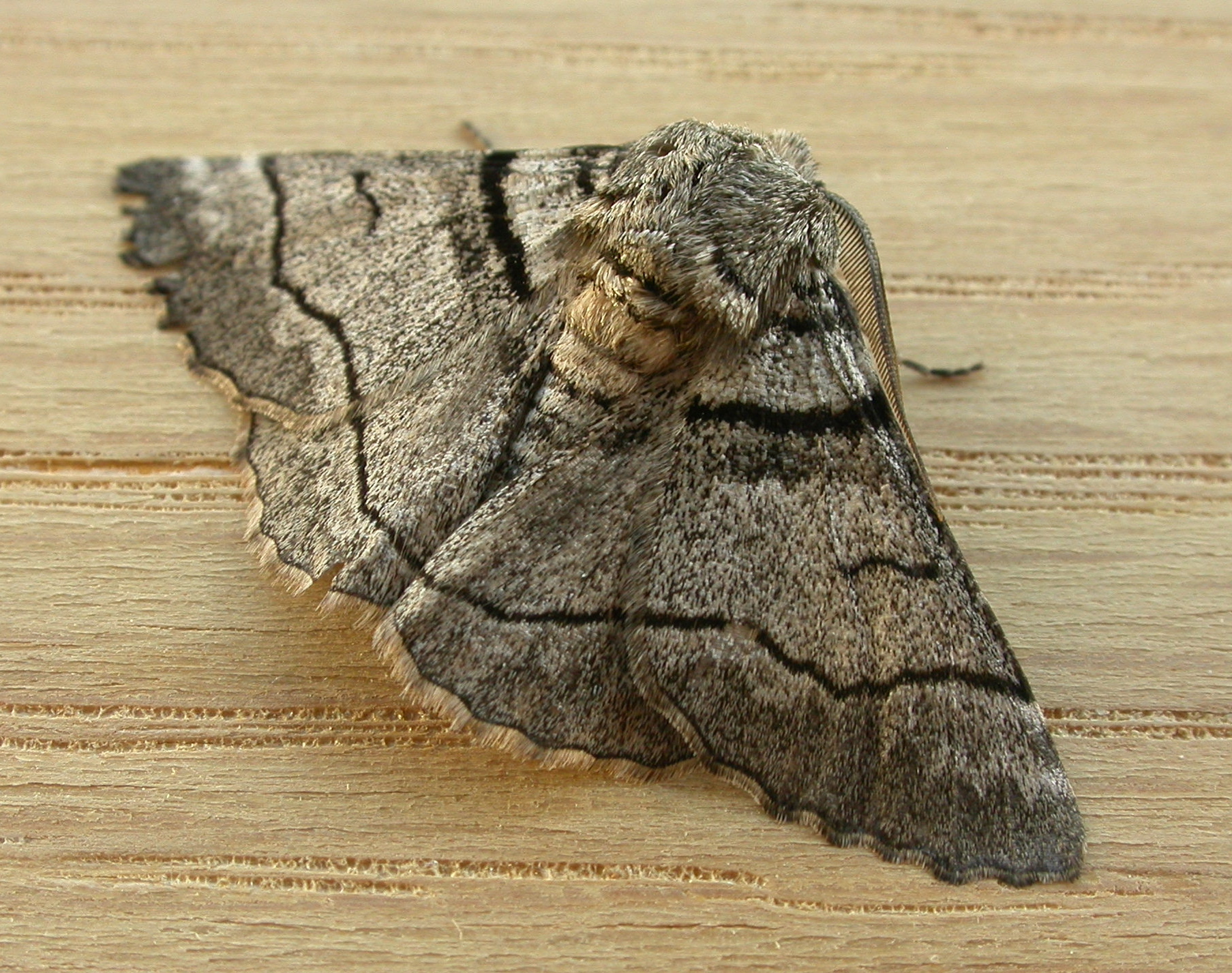

Scientific classification
- Kingdom: Animalia
- Phylum: Arthropoda
- Class: Insecta
- Order: Lepidoptera
- Family: Geometridae
- Genus: Hypobapta
- Species: H. diffundens

Binomial name
- Hypobapta diffundens (T. P. Lucas, 1891)

Synonyms
- Hypochroma diffundens Lucas, 1891; Hypochroma eugramma Lower 1892

= Hypobapta diffundens =

Species of moth

Hypobapta diffundens, the diffundens grey, is a moth of the family Geometridae first described by Thomas Pennington Lucas in 1891. It is found in the Australian state of Queensland.

The wingspan is about 20 mm.

The larvae feed on Eucalyptus species.
