= Hypobapta barnardi =

Scientific classification
- Kingdom: Animalia
- Phylum: Arthropoda
- Class: Insecta
- Order: Lepidoptera
- Family: Geometridae
- Genus: Hypobapta
- Species: H. barnardi

Binomial name
- Hypobapta barnardi Goldfinch, 1929

Species of moth

Hypobapta barnardi, or Barnard's grey, is a moth of the family Geometridae first described by Gilbert Macarthur Goldfinch in 1929. It is found in the Australian states of Queensland, New South Wales, South Australia and Western Australia.

The wingspan is about 30 mm.

The larvae feed on Eucalyptus odorata.
