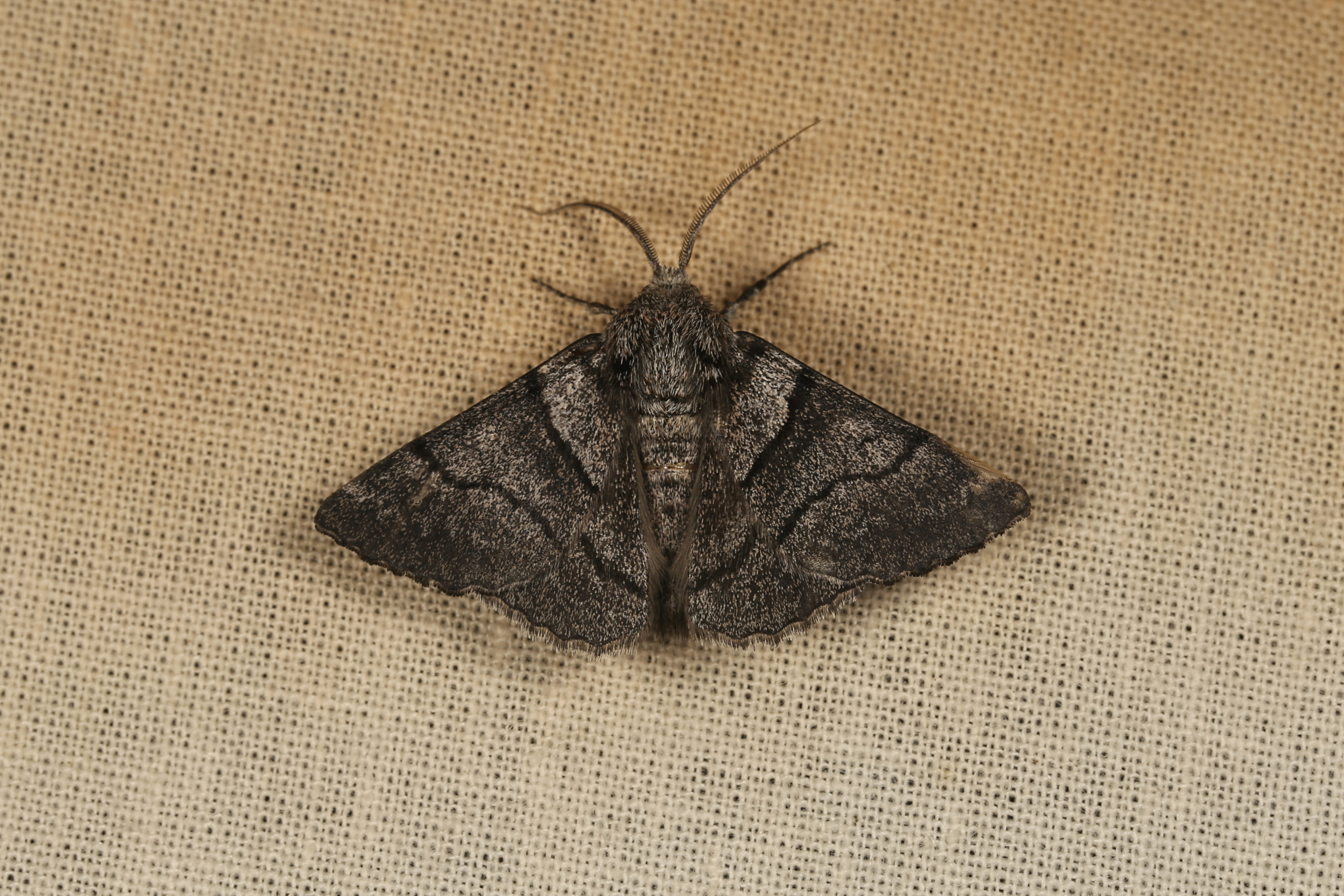

Scientific classification
- Kingdom: Animalia
- Phylum: Arthropoda
- Clade: Pancrustacea
- Class: Insecta
- Order: Lepidoptera
- Family: Geometridae
- Genus: Hypobapta
- Species: H. xenomorpha

Binomial name
- Hypobapta xenomorpha (Lower, 1915)

Synonyms
- Pseudoterpna xenomorpha Lower, 1915

= Hypobapta xenomorpha =

Species of moth

Hypobapta xenomorpha is a moth of the family Geometridae first described by Oswald Bertram Lower in 1915. It is found in Australia.
