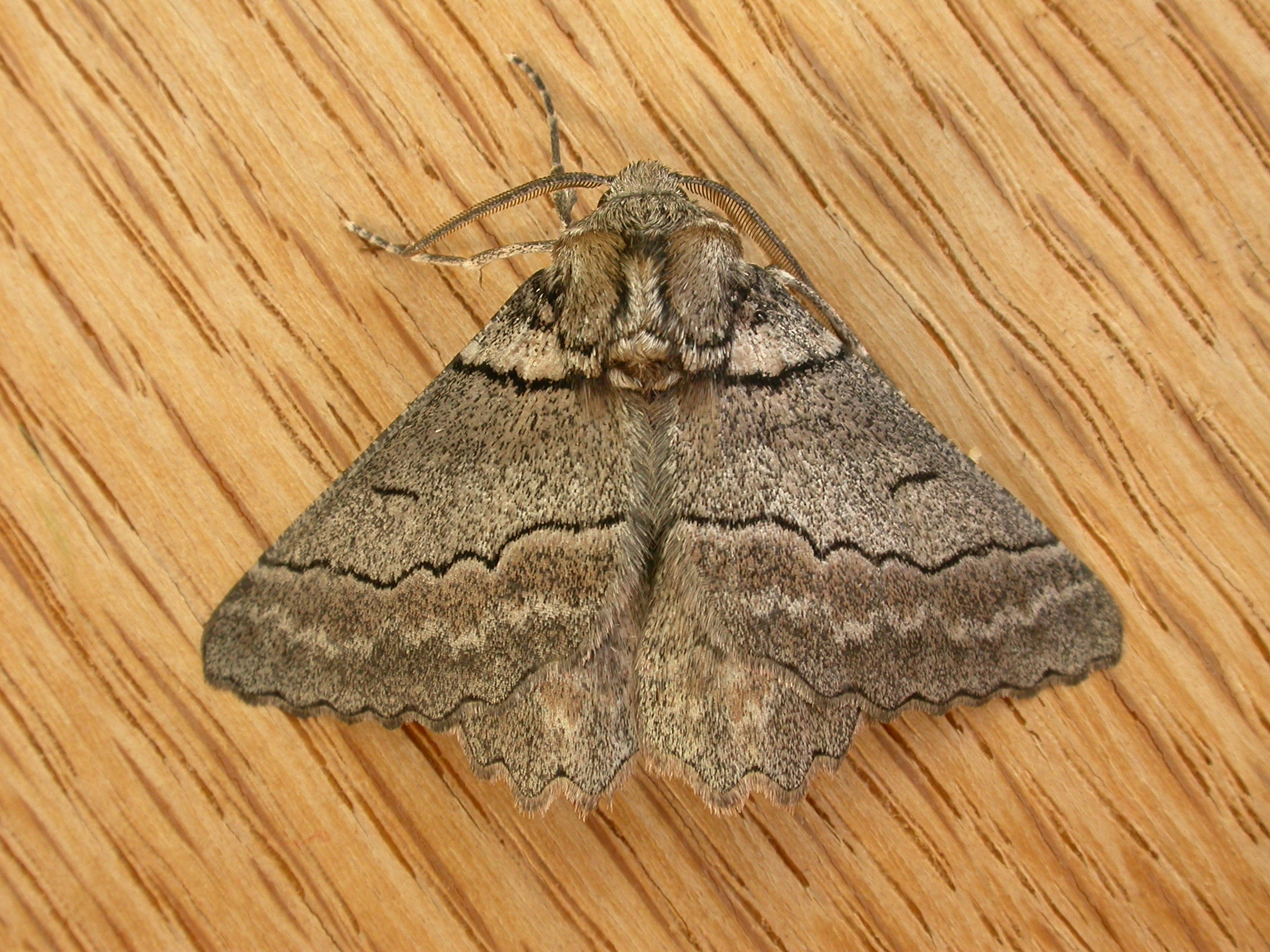

Scientific classification
- Kingdom: Animalia
- Phylum: Arthropoda
- Class: Insecta
- Order: Lepidoptera
- Family: Geometridae
- Genus: Hypobapta
- Species: H. percomptaria

Binomial name
- Hypobapta percomptaria (Guenée, 1857)

Synonyms
- Hypochroma percomptaria Guenée, 1857; Terpna percomptaria (Guenée, 1857); Pseudoterpna percomptaria (Guenée, 1857)

= Hypobapta percomptaria =

Species of moth

Hypobapta percomptaria, the southern grey, is a moth of the family Geometridae. It was first described by Achille Guenée in 1857. It is known from Australia. The study by Hausmann and colleagues (2009) restrict it to Tasmania; earlier records from the Australian mainland represent Hypobapta tachyhalotaria (sensu lato).

The wingspan for males is 32–38 mm (1.3–1.5 in) and for females 38–44 mm (1.5–1.7 in). The larvae feed on Eucalyptus.
