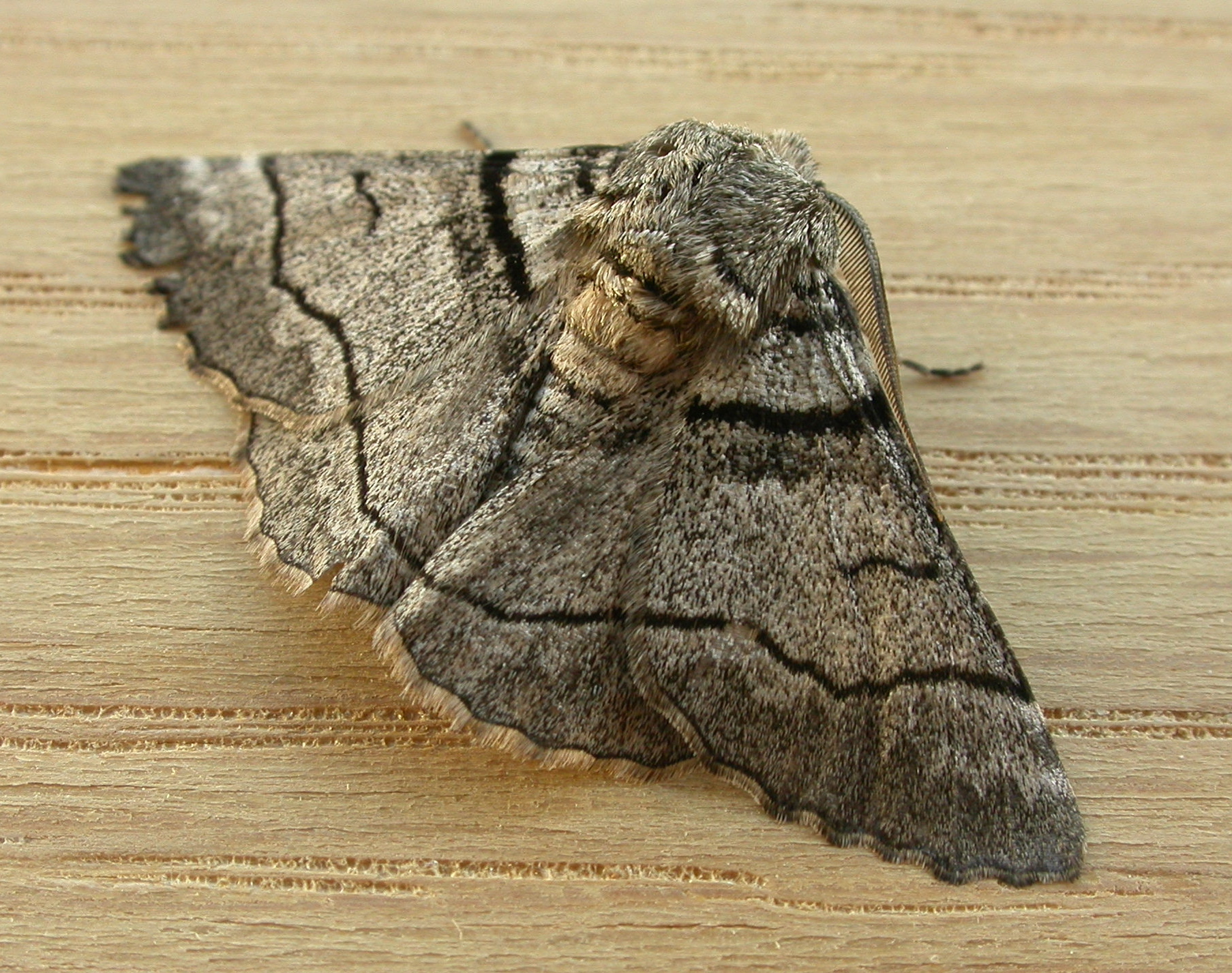
- Hypobapta diffundens

Scientific classification
- Kingdom: Animalia
- Phylum: Arthropoda
- Clade: Pancrustacea
- Class: Insecta
- Order: Lepidoptera
- Family: Geometridae
- Tribe: Pseudoterpnini
- Genus: Hypobapta; Prout, 1912

Synonyms
- Hypochroma Guenée, [1858]

= Hypobapta =

Genus of moths

Hypobapta is a genus of moths in the family Geometridae described by Prout in 1912.

== Species ==
- Hypobapta barnardi Goldfinch, 1929
- Hypobapta diffundens (Lucas, 1891) (=Hypochroma eugramma Lower 1892)
- Hypobapta percomptaria (Guenée, 1857)
- Hypobapta tachyhalotaria Hausmann & Sommerer, 2009
- Hypobapta xenomorpha (Lower, 1915)
