= Chorodna strixaria =

Scientific classification
- Kingdom: Animalia
- Phylum: Arthropoda
- Class: Insecta
- Order: Lepidoptera
- Family: Geometridae
- Genus: Chorodna
- Species: C. strixaria

Binomial name
- Chorodna strixaria (Guenée, 1858)

Synonyms
- Medasina strixaria Guenée, 1858

Species of moth

Chorodna strixaria is a moth of the family Geometridae first described by Achille Guenée in 1858. It is found in India, Vietnam, Sulawesi, the Philippines, the Moluccas, New Guinea, Australia and Sri Lanka.

Its wingspan is about 80 mm. There is a broad, pale costal zone to the forewing. The male has no forewing fovea. Antennae long and narrowly bipectinate (comb like on both sides). Abdomen has a setal comb. Body and wings of adult greyish-brown with wavy lines. Two dark spots found in the middle of the hindwings. Camellia sinensis is one of the major host plants of the caterpillar.

Two subspecies are recognized.

- Chorodna strixaria ceylonensis Prout, 1934 - Sri Lanka, India
- Chorodna strixaria telepompa Prout, 1934 - Philippines, Sulawesi, New Guinea
