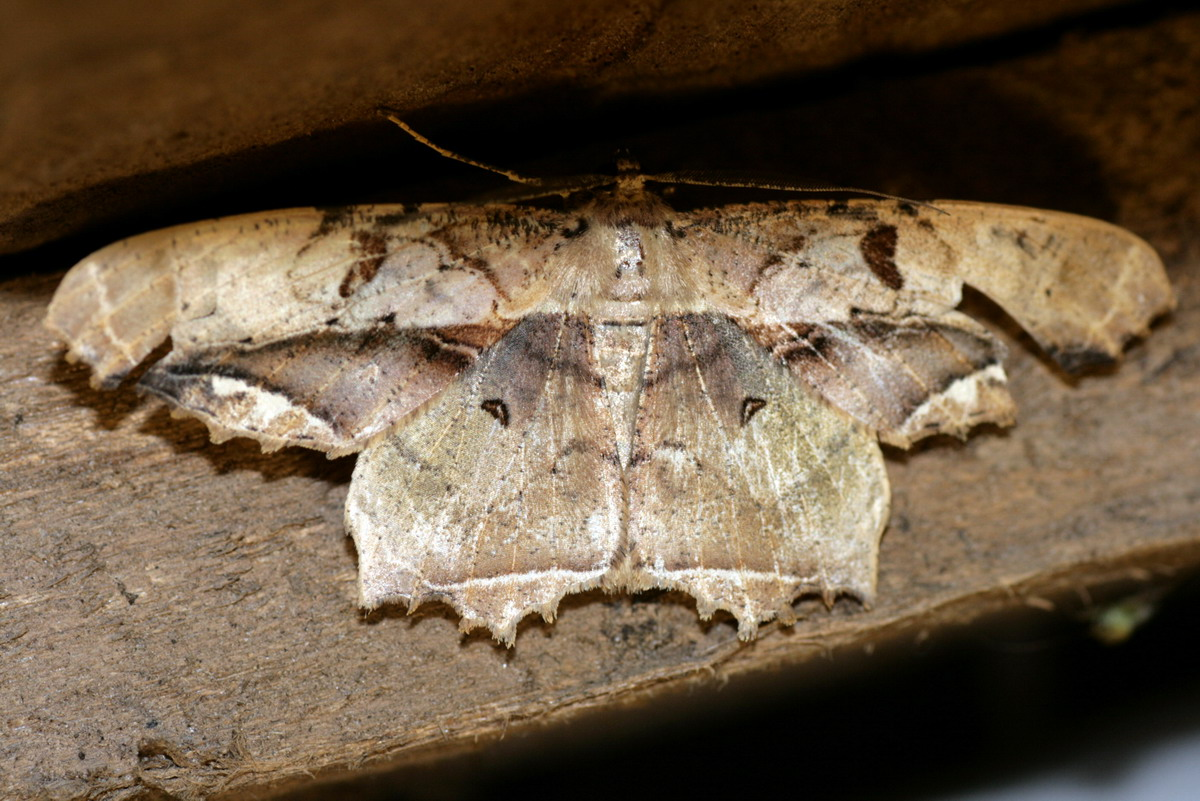

Scientific classification
- Kingdom: Animalia
- Phylum: Arthropoda
- Class: Insecta
- Order: Lepidoptera
- Family: Geometridae
- Subfamily: Ennominae
- Tribe: Boarmiini
- Genus: Chorodna
- Species: C. complicataria

Binomial name
- Chorodna complicataria Walker, 1860

= Chorodna complicataria =

Species of moth

Chorodna complicataria is a moth of the family Geometridae. It is found in Sundaland.
