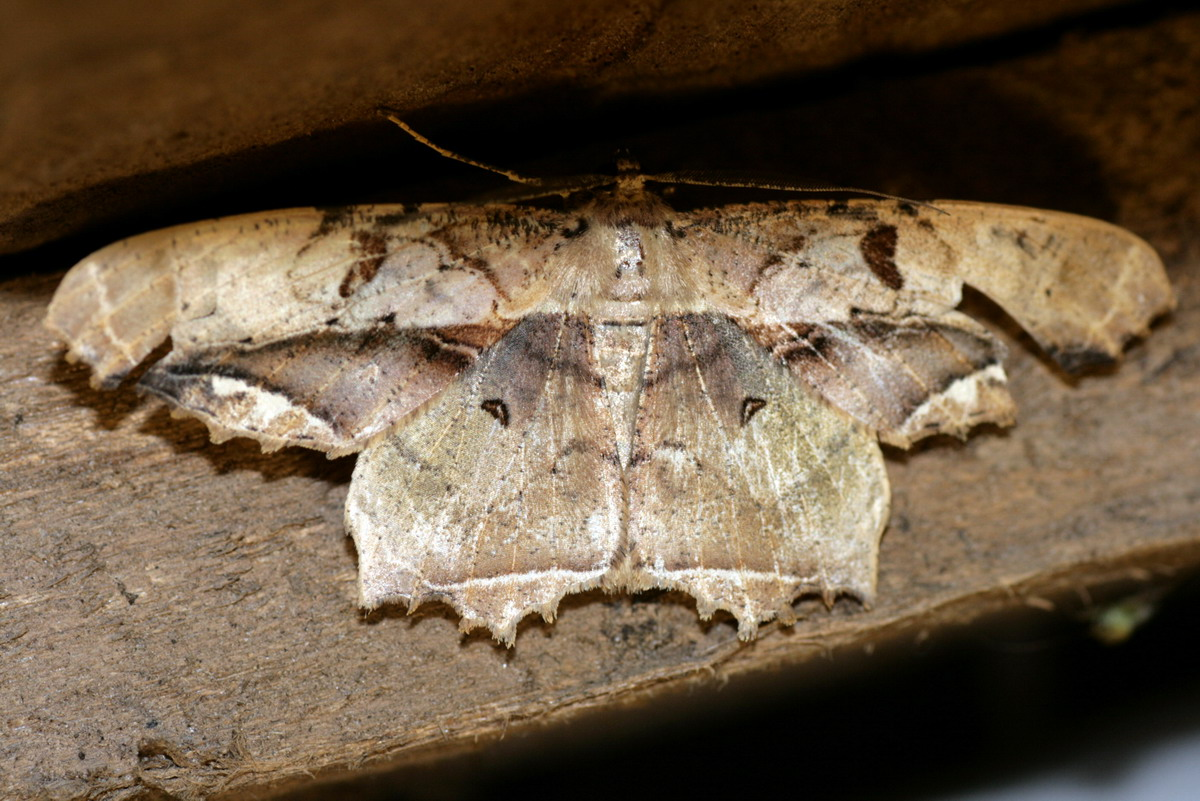
- Chorodna complicataria

Scientific classification
- Kingdom: Animalia
- Phylum: Arthropoda
- Class: Insecta
- Order: Lepidoptera
- Family: Geometridae
- Tribe: Boarmiini
- Genus: Chorodna; Walker, 1860

= Chorodna =

Genus of moths

Chorodna is a genus of moths in the family Geometridae. One of its synonyms is Medasina.

== Species ==
- Chorodna adumbrata (Moore, 1887)
- Chorodna celaenosticta (Prout, 1928)
- Chorodna complicataria (Walker, 1860)
- Chorodna creataria (Guenée, 1857)
- Chorodna erebusaria (Walker, 1860)
- Chorodna metaphaeria (Walker, 1862)
- Chorodna nigrovittata (Moore, 1868)
- Chorodna ochreimacula (Prout, 1914)
- Chorodna pallidularia Moore, 1867
- Chorodna praetextata (Felder, 1874)
- Chorodna pseudobolima Holloway, 1993
- Chorodna quadrinota Warren, 1893
- Chorodna scurobolima Holloway, 1993
- Chorodna semiclusaria Walker, 1862
- Chorodna strixaria (Guenée, 1857) (type species)
- Chorodna testaceata Moore, 1867
- Chorodna ugandaria (Swinhoe, 1904)
- Chorodna vagans (Moore, 1888)
- Chorodna vulpinaria Moore, 1867
