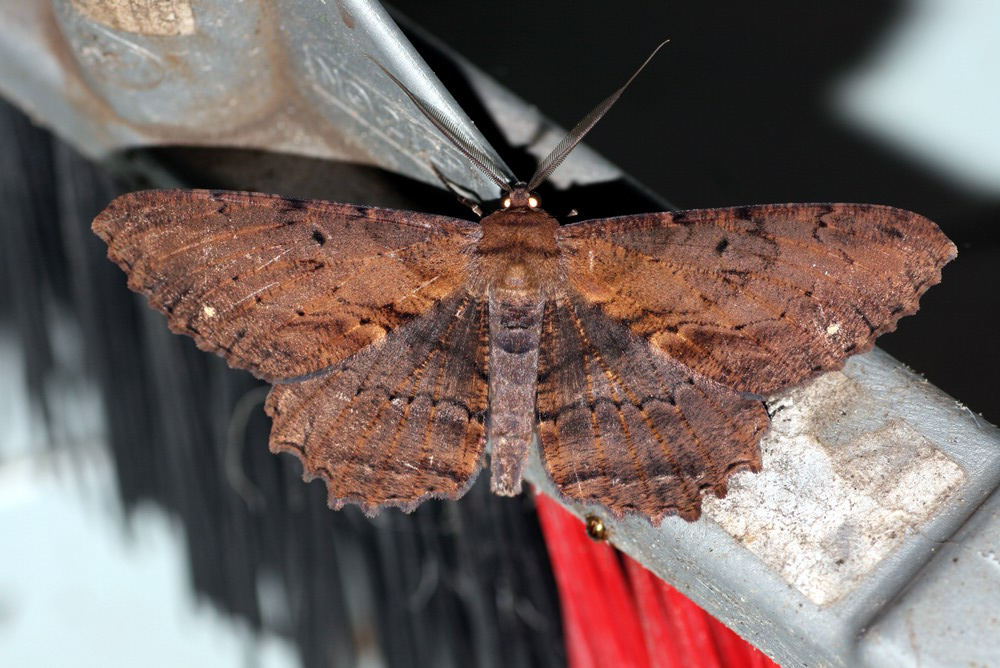

Scientific classification
- Kingdom: Animalia
- Phylum: Arthropoda
- Class: Insecta
- Order: Lepidoptera
- Family: Geometridae
- Genus: Chorodna
- Species: C. creataria

Binomial name
- Chorodna creataria (Guenée, [1858])

Synonyms
- Medasina creataria Guenée, [1858]; Medasina (Chorodna) creataria Guenée, [1858]

= Chorodna creataria =

Species of moth

Chorodna creataria is a moth of the family Geometridae first described by Achille Guenée in 1858. It is found in Taiwan, Nepal and India.
