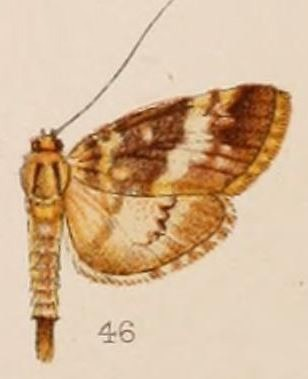
- Lygropia shevaroyalis

Scientific classification
- Kingdom: Animalia
- Phylum: Arthropoda
- Clade: Pancrustacea
- Class: Insecta
- Order: Lepidoptera
- Family: Crambidae
- Subfamily: Spilomelinae
- Tribe: Agroterini
- Genus: Lygropia; Lederer, 1863

Synonyms
- Hyperthalia Warren, 1896

= Lygropia =

Genus of moths

Lygropia is a genus of snout moths in the subfamily Spilomelinae of the family Crambidae. It currently comprises 66 species, which are mostly found in the tropical and subtropical regions of the Americas, Africa and Asia, but not in Australia.

The genus is placed in the tribe Agroterini.

== Species ==
- Lygropia acastalis (Walker, 1859)
- Lygropia acosmialis (Mabille, 1879)
- Lygropia amplificata (Warren, 1896)
- Lygropia anaemicalis Hampson, 1912
- Lygropia anthracopis Meyrick, 1934
- Lygropia antithetis Meyrick, 1937
- Lygropia arenacea Hampson, 1899
- Lygropia atrinervalis Hampson, 1910
- Lygropia aureomarginalis (Gaede, 1916)
- Lygropia bicincta Hampson, 1912
- Lygropia bilinealis (Walker, 1866)
- Lygropia cernalis (Guenée, 1854)
- Lygropia chrysozonalis Hampson, 1912
- Lygropia cosmia Dyar, 1912
- Lygropia cosmophilopis Meyrick, 1934
- Lygropia disarche Dyar, 1914
- Lygropia distorta (Moore, 1885)
- Lygropia erythrobathrum Dyar, 1914
- Lygropia euryclealis (Walker, 1859)
- Lygropia falsalis Dyar, 1918
- Lygropia flavicaput (Warren, 1896)
- Lygropia flavinotalis Hampson, 1912
- Lygropia flavivialis Hampson, 1912
- Lygropia flavofuscalis (Snellen, 1887)
- Lygropia fusalis Hampson, 1904
- Lygropia glaphyra Dyar, 1914
- Lygropia haroldi Dyar, 1914
- Lygropia holoxanthalis Holland, 1900
- Lygropia hyalostictalis Hampson, 1912
- Lygropia hypoleucalis Hampson, 1912
- Lygropia imparalis (Walker, 1866)
- Lygropia joasharia Schaus, 1940
- Lygropia joelalis Schaus, 1940
- Lygropia leucocepsalis Hampson, 1912
- Lygropia leucophanalis Mabille, 1900
- Lygropia leucostolalis Hampson, 1918
- Lygropia melanoperalis Hampson, 1912
- Lygropia memmialis (Walker, 1859)
- Lygropia murinalis Schaus, 1912
- Lygropia nigricornis Hampson, 1898
- Lygropia ochracealis (Saalmüller, 1880)
- Lygropia ochrotalis Hampson, 1912
- Lygropia orthotoma Meyrick, 1933
- Lygropia phaeocraspia Hampson, 1912
- Lygropia phaeoneuralis Hampson, 1912
- Lygropia phaeoxantha Meyrick, 1933
- Lygropia plumbicostalis (Grote, 1871)
- Lygropia pogonodes Hampson, 1912
- Lygropia poltisalis (Walker, 1859)
- Lygropia polytesalis (Walker, 1859)
- Lygropia rheumatica Meyrick, 1936
- Lygropia rivulalis Hampson, 1899
- Lygropia rotundalis (C. Felder, R. Felder & Rogenhofer, 1875)
- Lygropia schematospila Meyrick, 1937
- Lygropia shevaroyalis Hampson 1908
- Lygropia silacealis (Amsel, 1956)
- Lygropia straminea Hampson, 1912
- Lygropia sumatralis Swinhoe, 1916
- Lygropia szentivanyi (Munroe, 1968)
- Lygropia tetraspilalis Hampson, 1912
- Lygropia tripunctata (Fabricius, 1794)
- Lygropia unicoloralis (Guenée, 1854)
- Lygropia viettalis (Marion, 1956)
- Lygropia vinanyalis Viette, 1958
- Lygropia xanthozonalis (Hampson, 1895)
- Lygropia yerburii (Butler, 1886)

== Former species ==
- Lygropia egerialis (Snellen, 1899), transferred to Placosaris in Pyraustinae
- Lygropia octonalis (Zeller, 1873), transferred to Conchylodes
