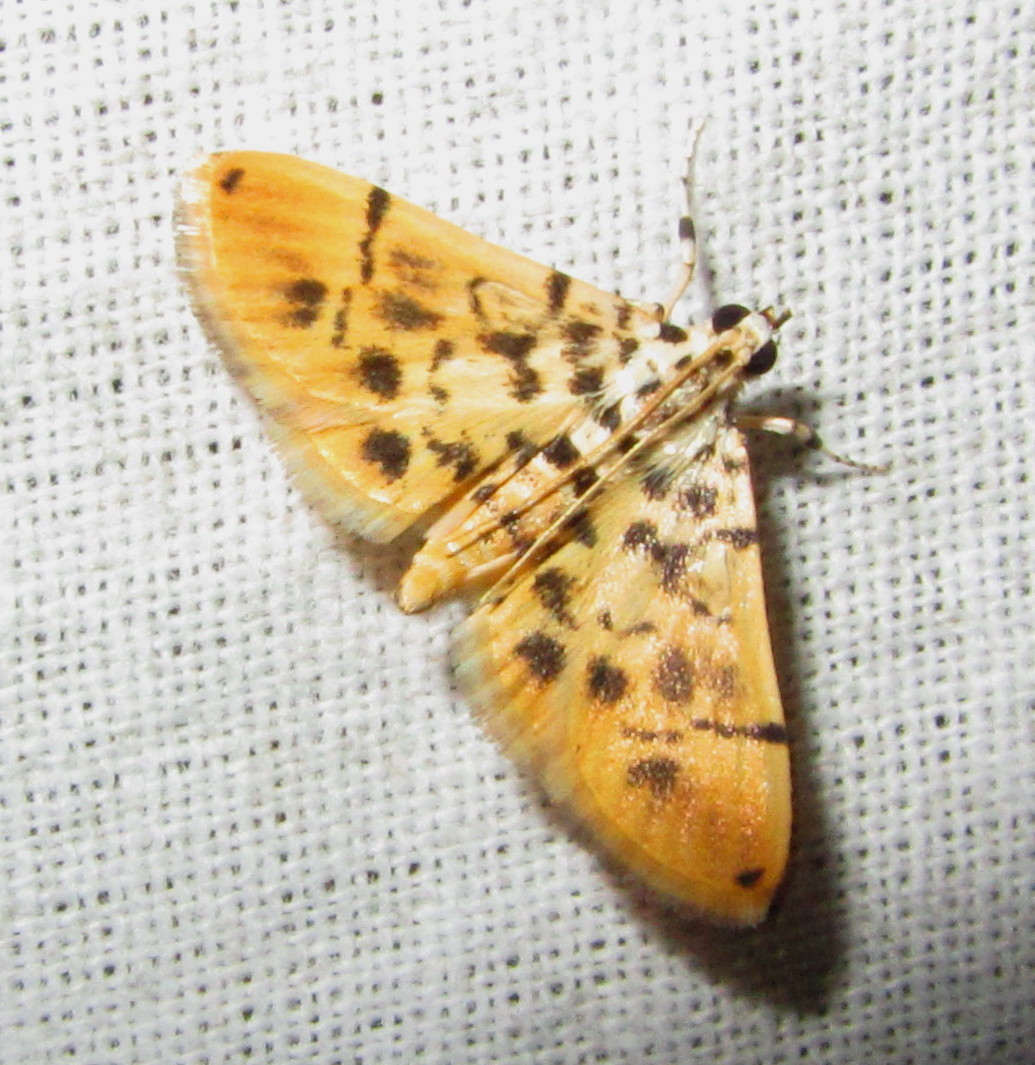
- Pycnarmon alboflavalis

Scientific classification
- Kingdom: Animalia
- Phylum: Arthropoda
- Clade: Pancrustacea
- Class: Insecta
- Order: Lepidoptera
- Family: Crambidae
- Genus: Pycnarmon; Lederer, 1863

Synonyms
- Aripana Moore, 1886; Entephria Lederer, 1863; Eutrichotis Swinhoe, 1900; Pyralocymatophora Strand, 1918; Satanastra Meyrick, 1890

= Pycnarmon =

Genus of moths

Pycnarmon is a genus of moths of the family Crambidae described by Julius Lederer in 1863.

== Species ==
- Pycnarmon abraxalis (Walker, 1866)
- Pycnarmon aeriferalis (Moore, 1877)
- Pycnarmon albivittalis (Hampson, 1912)
- Pycnarmon annulalis (Dognin, 1906)
- Pycnarmon argenticincta (Hampson, 1899)
- Pycnarmon argyria (Butler, 1879)
- Pycnarmon aripanalis (Hampson, 1899)
- Pycnarmon cecinalis (Dognin, 1897)
- Pycnarmon chinensis (South in Leech & South, 1901)
- Pycnarmon cribrata (Fabricius, 1794)
- Pycnarmon crocalis (Hampson, 1899)
- Pycnarmon decipiens Munroe, 1958
- Pycnarmon deicoonalis (Walker, 1859)
- Pycnarmon diaphana (Cramer, 1777)
- Pycnarmon dichocrocidalis (Strand, 1918)
- Pycnarmon diffusalis Hampson, 1917
- Pycnarmon eosalis Viette, 1958
- Pycnarmon fulvomarginalis (Pagenstecher, 1900)
- Pycnarmon geminipuncta (Hampson, 1912)
- Pycnarmon glaucias (Meyrick, 1894)
- Pycnarmon grisealis (Kenrick, 1912)
- Pycnarmon idalis (Walker, 1859)
- Pycnarmon jaguaralis (Guenée, 1854)
- Pycnarmon juanalis
- Pycnarmon lactiferalis (Walker, 1859)
- Pycnarmon leucinodialis
- Pycnarmon leucodoce Meyrick, 1936
- Pycnarmon levinia (Stoll in Cramer & Stoll, 1781)
- Pycnarmon macilentalis Viette, 1958
- Pycnarmon macrotis (Meyrick, 1897)
- Pycnarmon mallaleuca (Hampson, 1907)
- Pycnarmon marginalis (Snellen, 1890)
- Pycnarmon meritalis (Walker, 1859)
- Pycnarmon mioswari (Kenrick, 1912)
- Pycnarmon nebulosalis Hampson, 1896
- Pycnarmon obinusalis Walker, 1859
- Pycnarmon orophila Ghesquière, 1940
- Pycnarmon pantherata Butler, 1878
- Pycnarmon peruvialis
- Pycnarmon praeruptalis (Lederer, 1863)
- Pycnarmon pseudohesusalis Strand, 1920
- Pycnarmon pulchralis (Swinhoe, 1901)
- Pycnarmon quinquepuncta (Swinhoe, 1904)
- Pycnarmon radiata (Warren, 1896)
- Pycnarmon sarumalis (Holland, 1900)
- Pycnarmon schematospila (Meyrick, 1937)
- Pycnarmon sciophila Ghesquière, 1940
- Pycnarmon sericea Ghesquière, 1940
- Pycnarmon septemnotata (Mabille, 1900)
- Pycnarmon sexpunctalis (Hampson, 1912)
- Pycnarmon staminalis (Hampson, 1912)
- Pycnarmon subpictalis (Hampson, 1912)
- Pycnarmon syleptalis (Hampson, 1899)
- Pycnarmon tapeina Ghesquière, 1940
- Pycnarmon virgatalis Moore, 1867

== Former species ==
- Pycnarmon alboflavalis (Moore, 1888), now placed in Suhela
- Pycnarmon dialithalis Hampson, 1917
- Pycnarmon discinotalis Moore, 1877
- Pycnarmon vohilavalis (Viette, 1954)
