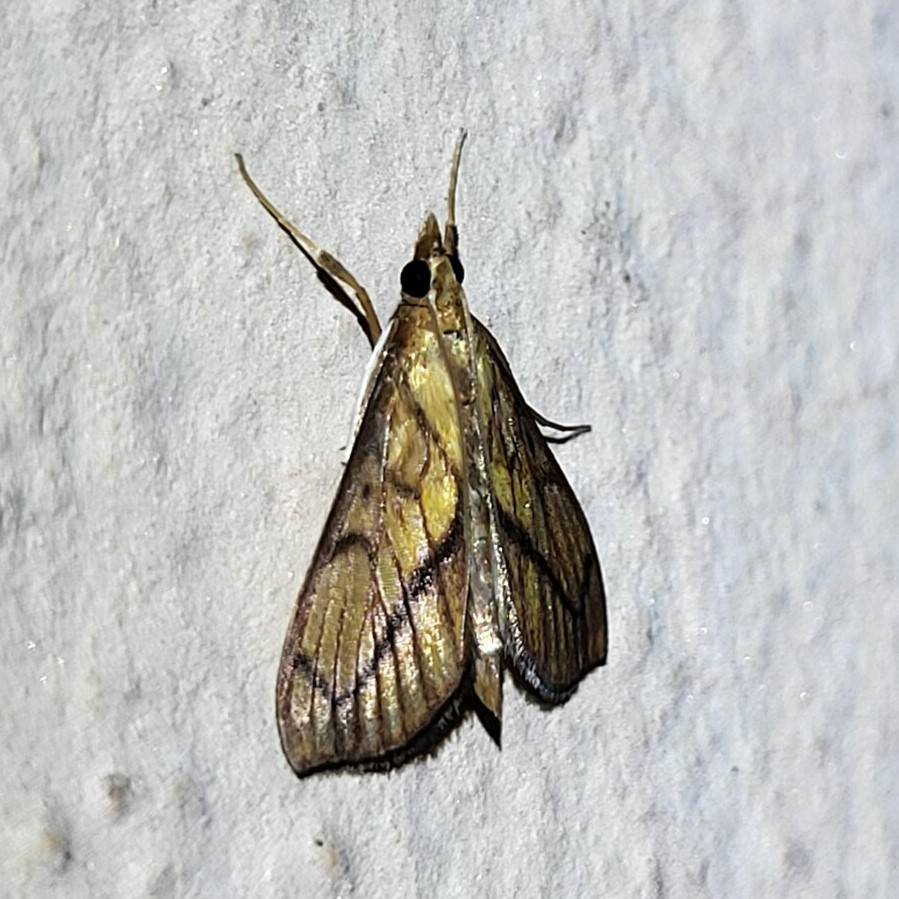

Scientific classification
- Kingdom: Animalia
- Phylum: Arthropoda
- Clade: Pancrustacea
- Class: Insecta
- Order: Lepidoptera
- Family: Crambidae
- Genus: Placosaris
- Species: P. labordalis

Binomial name
- Placosaris labordalis (Viette, 1958)

Synonyms
- Pyrausta labordalis Viette, 1958

= Placosaris labordalis =

Species of moth

Placosaris labordalis is a species of moth in the family Crambidae described by Pierre Viette in 1958. It is found in eastern Madagascar.

Its wingspan is 20–23 mm, with a length of the forewings of 9.5–11 mm. Its pattern is close to Placosaris triticalis.

The holotype had been collected near Anosibé in eastern Madagascar.
