= Pycnarmon macilentalis =

Scientific classification
- Kingdom: Animalia
- Phylum: Arthropoda
- Clade: Pancrustacea
- Class: Insecta
- Order: Lepidoptera
- Family: Crambidae
- Genus: Pycnarmon
- Species: P. macilentalis

Binomial name
- Pycnarmon macilentalis Viette, 1958

Species of moth

Pycnarmon macilentalis is a moth in the family Crambidae. It was described by Viette in 1958. It is found in Madagascar.
