= Placosaris cricophora =

Scientific classification
- Domain: Eukaryota
- Kingdom: Animalia
- Phylum: Arthropoda
- Class: Insecta
- Order: Lepidoptera
- Family: Crambidae
- Genus: Placosaris
- Species: P. cricophora

Binomial name
- Placosaris cricophora (West, 1931)

Synonyms
- Pyrausta cricophora West, 1931; Placosaris crociphora Auctt. (Missp.)

Species of moth

Placosaris cricophora is a moth in the family Crambidae. It was described by West in 1931. It is found in the Philippines (Luzon).
