= Placosaris leucula =

Scientific classification
- Kingdom: Animalia
- Phylum: Arthropoda
- Class: Insecta
- Order: Lepidoptera
- Family: Crambidae
- Genus: Placosaris
- Species: P. leucula

Binomial name
- Placosaris leucula Meyrick, 1897

Synonyms
- Pyrausta homoeides West, 1931

Species of moth

Placosaris leucula is a moth in the family Crambidae. It was described by Edward Meyrick in 1897. It is found in the Sangihe Islands of Indonesia and the island of Luzon in the Philippines.
