= Placosaris intensalis =

Scientific classification
- Domain: Eukaryota
- Kingdom: Animalia
- Phylum: Arthropoda
- Class: Insecta
- Order: Lepidoptera
- Family: Crambidae
- Genus: Placosaris
- Species: P. intensalis

Binomial name
- Placosaris intensalis (C. Swinhoe, 1894)

Synonyms
- Ebulea intensalis C. Swinhoe, 1894

Species of moth

Placosaris intensalis is a moth in the family Crambidae. It was described by Charles Swinhoe in 1894. It is found in Meghalaya, India.
