= Pycnarmon sexpunctalis =

Scientific classification
- Kingdom: Animalia
- Phylum: Arthropoda
- Class: Insecta
- Order: Lepidoptera
- Family: Crambidae
- Genus: Pycnarmon
- Species: P. sexpunctalis

Binomial name
- Pycnarmon sexpunctalis (Hampson, 1912)

Synonyms
- Entephria sexpunctalis Hampson, 1912

Species of moth

Pycnarmon sexpunctalis is a moth in the family Crambidae. It was described by George Hampson in 1912. It is found in the Democratic Republic of the Congo (Équateur), Nigeria and Sierra Leone.

The larvae feed on Strophanthus species.
