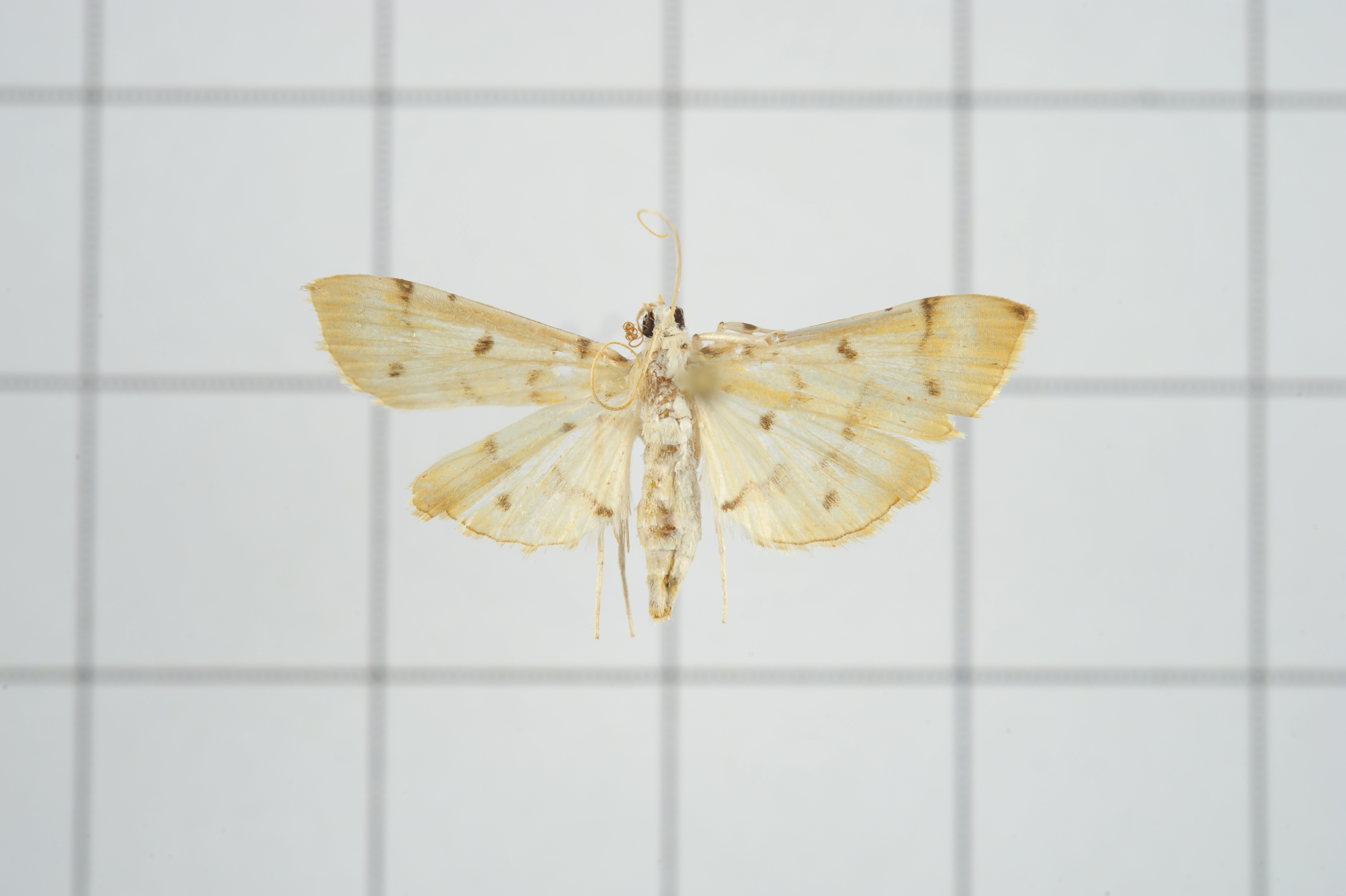

Scientific classification
- Domain: Eukaryota
- Kingdom: Animalia
- Phylum: Arthropoda
- Class: Insecta
- Order: Lepidoptera
- Family: Crambidae
- Genus: Pycnarmon
- Species: P. aeriferalis

Binomial name
- Pycnarmon aeriferalis (Moore, 1877)

Synonyms
- Conchylodes aeriferalis Moore, 1877

= Pycnarmon aeriferalis =

Species of moth

Pycnarmon aeriferalis is a moth in the family Crambidae. It was described by Frederic Moore in 1877. It is found in India (Sikkim, Andamans) and Taiwan.

The wingspan is about 22 mm. Adults are ochreous with black spots. The antemedial line on the forewings is brown and curved and the postmedial line is blackish, straight from the costa to the submarginal black spot. There is an apical black speck. The hind wings have black post-medial lines and submarginal spots.
