= Pycnarmon mallaleuca =

Scientific classification
- Kingdom: Animalia
- Phylum: Arthropoda
- Class: Insecta
- Order: Lepidoptera
- Family: Crambidae
- Genus: Pycnarmon
- Species: P. mallaleuca

Binomial name
- Pycnarmon mallaleuca (Hampson, 1907)

Synonyms
- Stenia mallaleuca Hampson, 1907

Species of moth

Pycnarmon mallaleuca is a moth in the family Crambidae. It was described by George Hampson in 1907. It is found in the Brazilian states of Paraná and São Paulo.

The wingspan is about 20 mm. Adults are pure white, the forewings with some dark points on the costa and the lines are pale yellow brown. There are traces of a discoidal spot. The hindwings have an indistinct discoidal spot and the postmedial line is excurved between veins 5 and 2, then retracted to below the end of the cell.
