= Pycnarmon radiata =

Scientific classification
- Domain: Eukaryota
- Kingdom: Animalia
- Phylum: Arthropoda
- Class: Insecta
- Order: Lepidoptera
- Family: Crambidae
- Genus: Pycnarmon
- Species: P. radiata

Binomial name
- Pycnarmon radiata (Warren, 1896)

Synonyms
- Aripana radiata Warren, 1896

Species of moth

Pycnarmon radiata is a moth in the family Crambidae. It was described by William Warren in 1896. It is found in China and India.

The wingspan is 28 mm. The forewings are white, with a faint ochreous tinge and a minute black dot at the base of the costa, a black spot on the median near the base and another on the inner margin further from the base. There is also a black spot on the costa at one third, from which the first line runs vertical to the inner margin. There is a small black dot in the cell and a large black spot at the end, a black streak runs from below the small dot to the inner margin before the anal angle, another from below the discal spot to the hind margin above the anal angle. There is a row of black marginal spots increasing in size as they approach the anal angle. There is a thick black outer line from the costa beyond two thirds. The hindwings have a large black discal spot, with a smaller one nearer the base, and a black postmedian line forming two large curves, one round the cell, the other below it, to a black spot on the inner margin.
