= Placosaris arjunoalis =

Scientific classification
- Domain: Eukaryota
- Kingdom: Animalia
- Phylum: Arthropoda
- Class: Insecta
- Order: Lepidoptera
- Family: Crambidae
- Genus: Placosaris
- Species: P. arjunoalis

Binomial name
- Placosaris arjunoalis Munroe & Mutuura, 1970

Species of moth

Placosaris arjunoalis is a moth in the family Crambidae. It was described by Eugene G. Munroe and Akira Mutuura in 1970. It is found on Java in Indonesia.
