= Pycnarmon mioswari =

Scientific classification
- Kingdom: Animalia
- Phylum: Arthropoda
- Class: Insecta
- Order: Lepidoptera
- Family: Crambidae
- Genus: Pycnarmon
- Species: P. mioswari

Binomial name
- Pycnarmon mioswari (Kenrick, 1912)

Synonyms
- Entephria mioswari Kenrick, 1912

Species of moth

Pycnarmon mioswari is a moth in the family Crambidae. It was described by George Hamilton Kenrick in 1912. It is found in Papua New Guinea, where it has been recorded from Mioswar Island.

The wingspan is about 24 mm. The forewings are white, with a small sooty black spot near the base of the cell and a larger round one at the end. There is a costal black spot before the apex, from which springs a pale transverse ochreous line reaching the inner margin. The hindwings are white, with a small dark spot near the base and a thin median line with a darker hind margin.
