= Pycnarmon syleptalis =

Scientific classification
- Kingdom: Animalia
- Phylum: Arthropoda
- Class: Insecta
- Order: Lepidoptera
- Family: Crambidae
- Genus: Pycnarmon
- Species: P. syleptalis

Binomial name
- Pycnarmon syleptalis (Hampson, 1899)

Synonyms
- Entephria syleptalis Hampson, 1899

Species of moth

Pycnarmon syleptalis is a moth in the family Crambidae. It was described by George Hampson in 1899. It is found in Loja Province, Ecuador.

The wingspan is about 40 mm. The forewings are ochreous, tinged with olive and irrorated (sprinkled) with olive-brown scales. The costal area and terminal area are suffused with brown. The antemedial line is dark and there is a point in the cell, as well as a prominent discoidal lunule. The postmedial line is marked by points and there is a terminal series of black points. The hindwings are whitish, with a black discoidal point. The postmedial line is very strongly bent outwards between veins 2 and 5. The termen is suffused with brown and there is a terminal series of black strigae.
