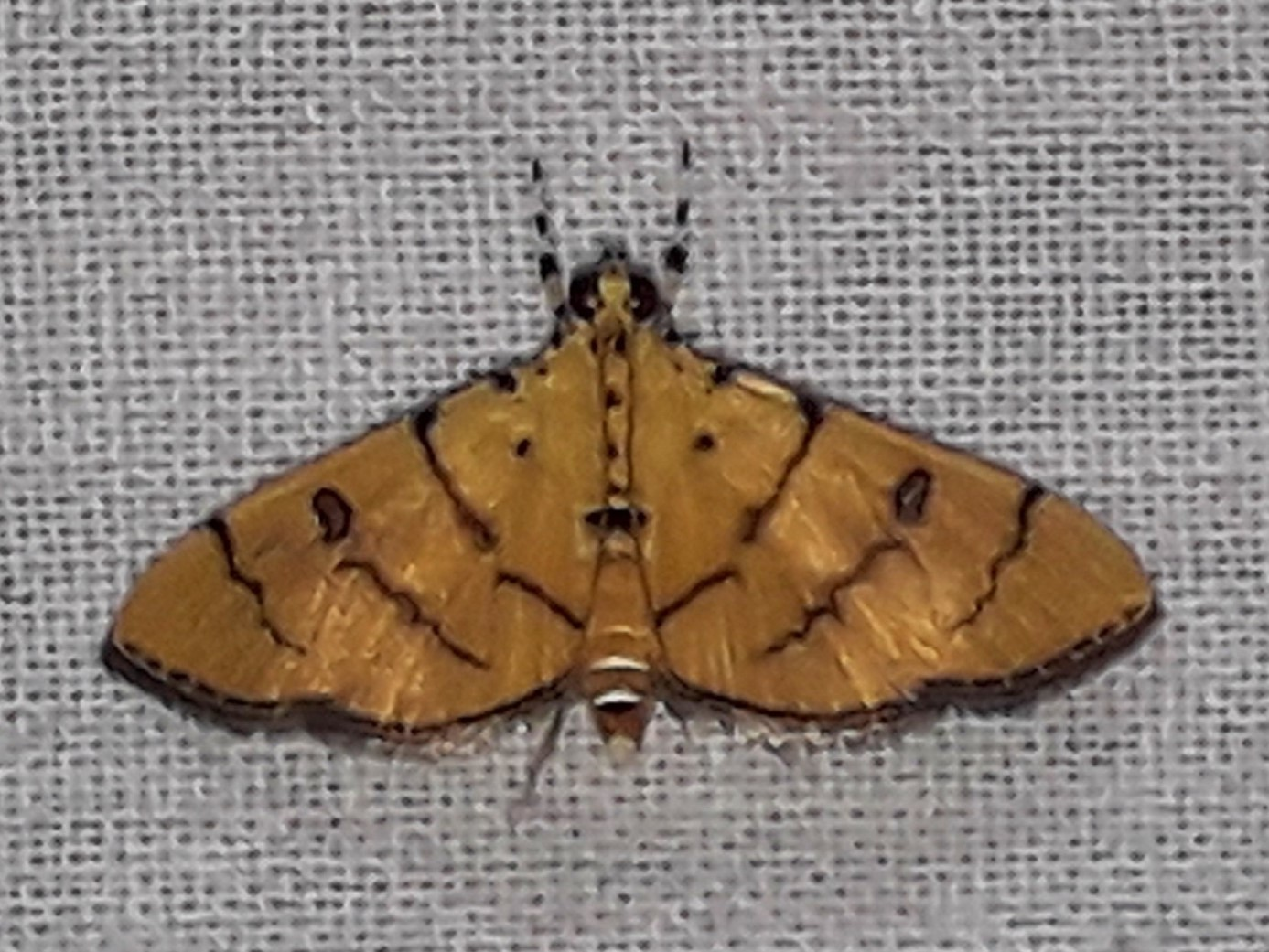

Scientific classification
- Kingdom: Animalia
- Phylum: Arthropoda
- Class: Insecta
- Order: Lepidoptera
- Family: Crambidae
- Genus: Lygropia
- Species: L. cernalis

Binomial name
- Lygropia cernalis (Guenée, 1854)

Synonyms
- Asopia cernalis Guenée, 1854

= Lygropia cernalis =

Species of moth

Lygropia cernalis is a species of moth in the family Crambidae. It was described by Achille Guenée in 1854. It is found in French Guiana.
