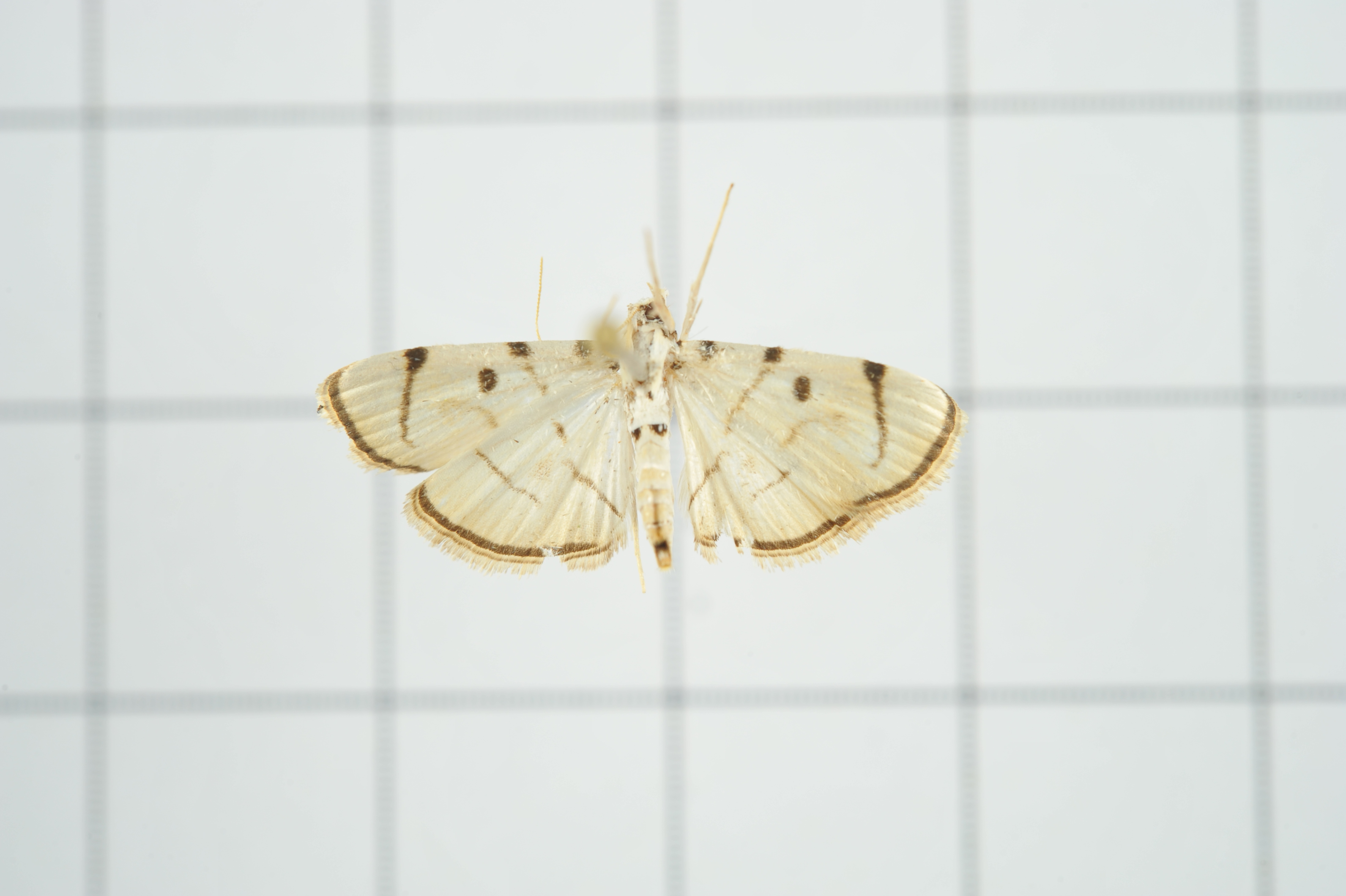

Scientific classification
- Domain: Eukaryota
- Kingdom: Animalia
- Phylum: Arthropoda
- Class: Insecta
- Order: Lepidoptera
- Family: Crambidae
- Genus: Pycnarmon
- Species: P. marginalis

Binomial name
- Pycnarmon marginalis (Snellen, 1890)

Synonyms
- Conchylodes marginalis Snellen, 1890

= Pycnarmon marginalis =

Species of moth

Pycnarmon marginalis is a moth in the family Crambidae. It was described by Samuel Constantinus Snellen van Vollenhoven in 1890. It is found in Sikkim, India and Taiwan.

The wingspan is about 20 mm. Adults are glossy white, the forewings with black spots at the base of the costa and vein 1 and with subbasal and antemedial larger spots on the costa, as well as a discocellular spot. The postmedial line is strongly marked and outwardly oblique from the costa to vein 2, then obsolescent and retracted to below the angle of the cell. The hindwings have a discocellular spot and the postmedial line is nearly straight from costa to vein 2, then retracted to below the angle of the cell. Both wings have a very prominent broad black marginal line.
