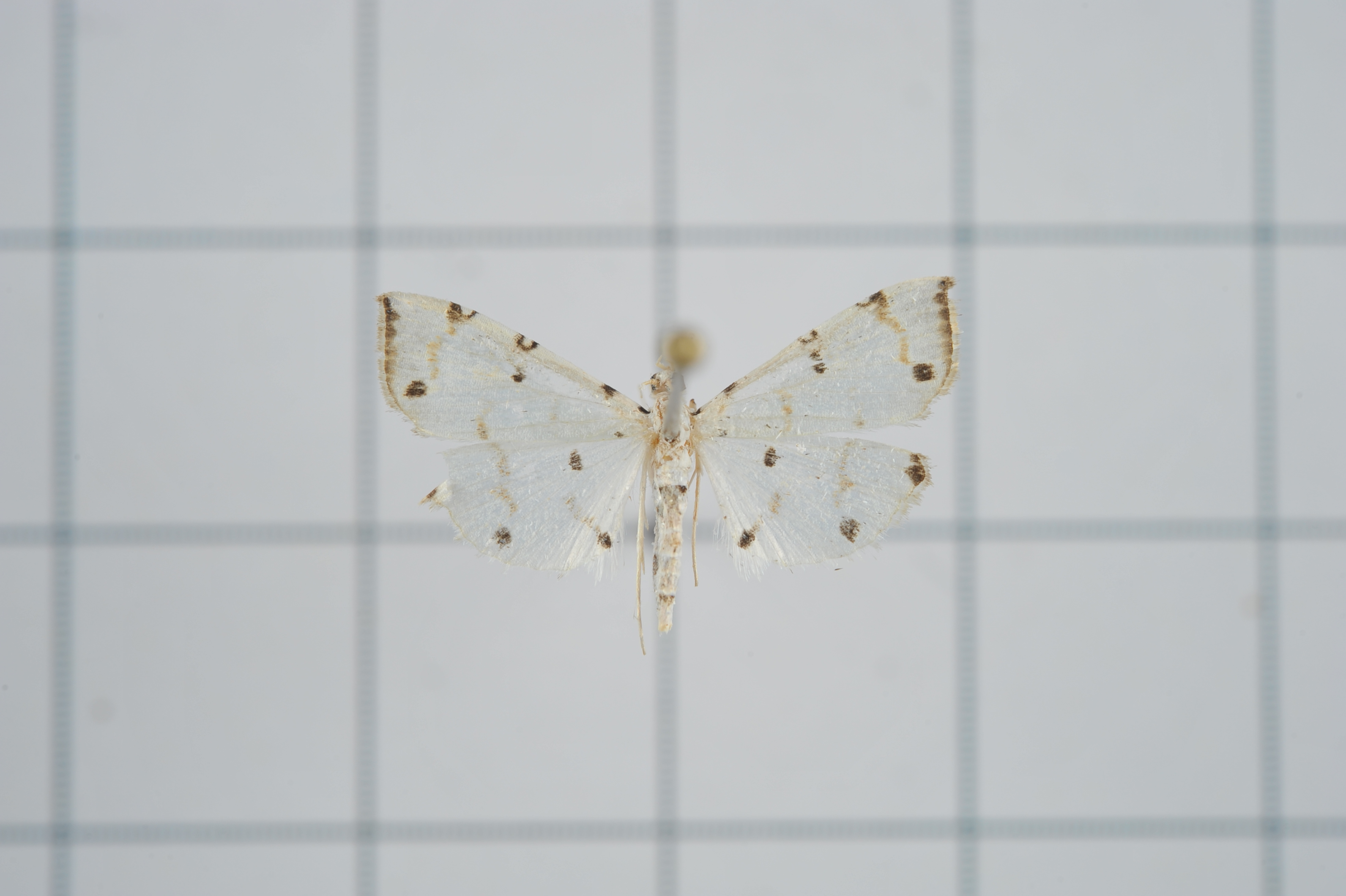

Scientific classification
- Kingdom: Animalia
- Phylum: Arthropoda
- Clade: Pancrustacea
- Class: Insecta
- Order: Lepidoptera
- Family: Crambidae
- Genus: Pycnarmon
- Species: P. meritalis

Binomial name
- Pycnarmon meritalis (Walker, 1859)

Synonyms
- Zebronia meritalis Walker, 1859; Aripana annulata Warren, 1896; Conchylodes baptalis Snellen, 1880; Zebronia plexippusalis Walker, 1859

= Pycnarmon meritalis =

Species of moth

Pycnarmon meritalis is a moth in the family Crambidae. It was described by Francis Walker in 1859. It is found in Democratic Republic of the Congo (Katanga, West Kasai), South Africa, Australia, China, Sri Lanka, India, Indonesia (Borneo, Java, Sulawesi, Sumatra), Taiwan and Japan.

The wingspan is about 15 mm. Adults are white with several brown spots, mainly at the wing margins.
