= Pycnarmon leucinodialis =

Scientific classification
- Domain: Eukaryota
- Kingdom: Animalia
- Phylum: Arthropoda
- Class: Insecta
- Order: Lepidoptera
- Family: Crambidae
- Genus: Pycnarmon
- Species: P. leucinodialis

Binomial name
- Pycnarmon leucinodialis (Schaus, 1912)

Synonyms
- Entephria leucinodialis Schaus, 1912

Species of moth

Pycnarmon leucinodialis is a moth in the family Crambidae described by William Schaus in 1912. It is found in Costa Rica.

The wingspan is about 21 mm. The wings are semihyaline iridescent white, the forewings have a more thickly scaled costal margin. There is a brownish streak on the costa towards base and two short streaks in the cell below it, as well as a white line on the discocellular, edged with pale brown. The outer line is fuscous and broad and the marginal area is shaded with light brown, except on the costa at the apex. The hindwings have a brownish shade on the discocellular, followed by some dark points. There is a subterminal fuscous line, which is more heavily marked on the costa and inner margin. The termen is more heavily scaled and silvery white.
