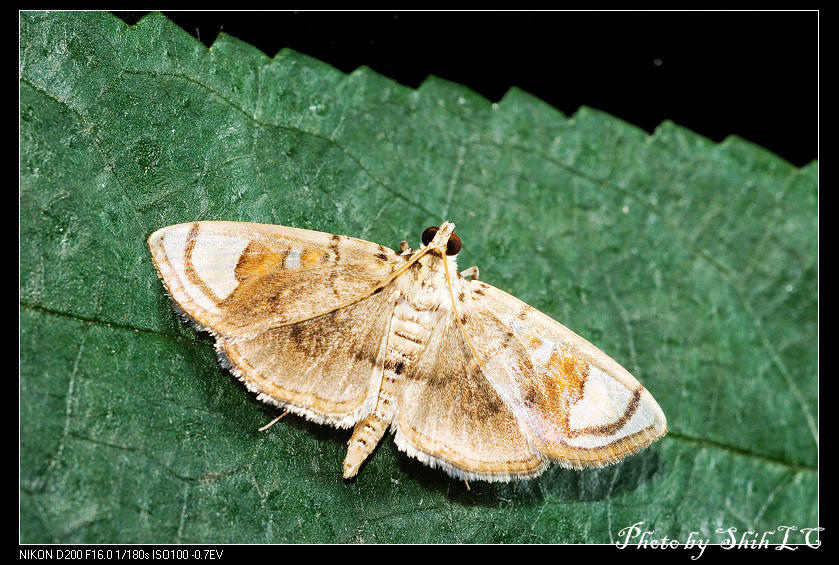

Scientific classification
- Kingdom: Animalia
- Phylum: Arthropoda
- Clade: Pancrustacea
- Class: Insecta
- Order: Lepidoptera
- Family: Crambidae
- Genus: Pycnarmon
- Species: P. pantherata

Binomial name
- Pycnarmon pantherata (Butler, 1878)

Synonyms
- Crocidophora pantherata Butler, 1878

= Pycnarmon pantherata =

Species of moth

Pycnarmon pantherata is a moth in the family Crambidae. It was described by Arthur Gardiner Butler in 1878. It is found in Russia, Japan, China and Taiwan.

The wingspan is 23–26 mm.
