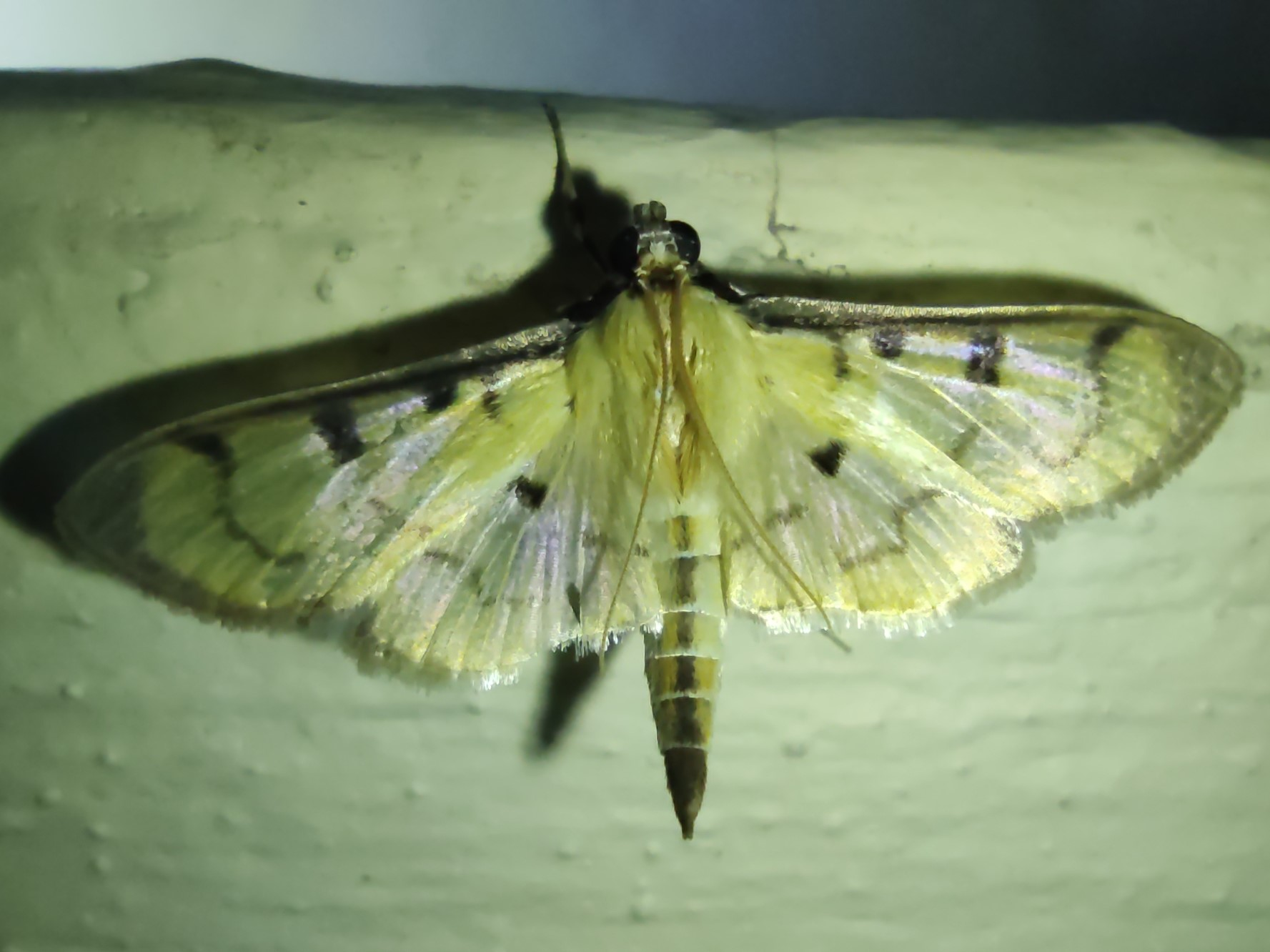

Scientific classification
- Kingdom: Animalia
- Phylum: Arthropoda
- Class: Insecta
- Order: Lepidoptera
- Family: Crambidae
- Genus: Lygropia
- Species: L. plumbicostalis

Binomial name
- Lygropia plumbicostalis (Grote, 1871)

Synonyms
- Botys plumbicostalis Grote, 1871

= Lygropia plumbicostalis =

Species of moth

Lygropia plumbicostalis is a species of moth in the family Crambidae. It was described by Augustus Radcliffe Grote in 1871. It is found in the United States, where it has been recorded from Arizona, Florida and Texas.

The wingspan is about 27 mm. Adults have been recorded on wing from May to September.
