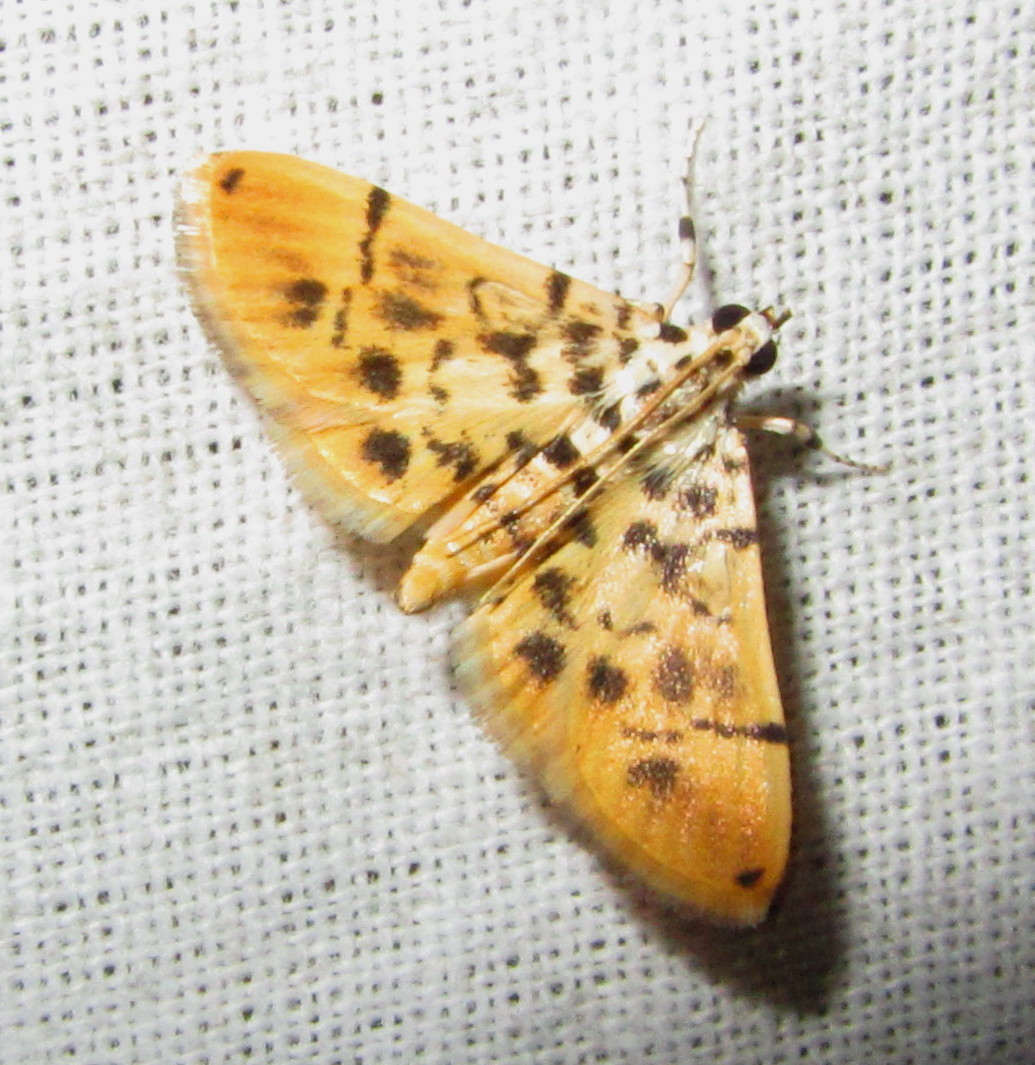
- Suhela alboflavalis, male imago

Scientific classification
- Kingdom: Animalia
- Phylum: Arthropoda
- Class: Insecta
- Order: Lepidoptera
- Family: Crambidae
- Subfamily: Spilomelinae
- Tribe: Agroterini
- Genus: Suhela; Singh, Ranjan, Kirti & Chandra, 2022

Synonyms
- Nagia Walker, 1866

= Suhela =

Genus of moths

Suhela is a genus of moths in the species-rich subfamily Spilomelinae of the family Crambidae.

== Distribution ==
The two species of Suhela were described from India, and S. alboflavalis is also reported from Nepal.

== Species ==
- Suhela alboflavalis (Moore, 1888)
- Suhela cuneus Rao, Sivaperuman & Mally, 2024

== Nomenclature and systematics ==
The type species of Suhela, S. alboflavalis, was originally described by Frederic Moore, who placed it in the genus Conogethes. Later, the species was placed in Pycnarmon, until it was eventually discovered that it fits in neither of the two genera nor in any other described genus in Spilomelinae, so that Suhela was described to harbour the species.

Suhela resembles Tylostega in several morphological characters in the adults, such as a similar wing pattern, a field of long scales on the underside of the male forewing, labial palps that are curved and upturned, and generally similar male and female genitalia.

The genus is placed in the tribe Agroterini based on the upturned labial palpi, and in the male genitalia the truncate uncus bearing simple chaetae.

Suhela is named after S. Suhel Singh Gill, an Indian social reformist and the great-grandfather of the first author of the publication establishing the genus name, Navneet Singh.
