= Pycnarmon levinia =

Scientific classification
- Domain: Eukaryota
- Kingdom: Animalia
- Phylum: Arthropoda
- Class: Insecta
- Order: Lepidoptera
- Family: Crambidae
- Genus: Pycnarmon
- Species: P. levinia

Binomial name
- Pycnarmon levinia (Stoll in Cramer & Stoll, 1781)

Synonyms
- Phalaena levinia Stoll in Cramer & Stoll, 1781; Zebronia bunusalis Walker, 1859

Species of moth

Pycnarmon levinia is a moth in the family Crambidae. It was described by Caspar Stoll in 1781. It is found in Suriname, in the Brazilian states of Rio de Janeiro and Espírito Santo and in Grenada.

The wingspan is about 28 mm. Adults are bright orange, the forewings with a black spot at the base of the costa. There is a slightly curved antemedial fuscous line which is black towards the costa, as well as a discocellular lunule. The postmedial line is sinuous. The hindwings have a discocellular spot, a slightly sinuous postmedial line.
