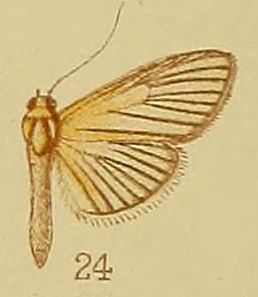
- Lygropia atrinervalis

Scientific classification
- Kingdom: Animalia
- Phylum: Arthropoda
- Class: Insecta
- Order: Lepidoptera
- Family: Crambidae
- Genus: Lygropia
- Species: L. atrinervalis

Binomial name
- Lygropia atrinervalis Hampson, 1910

= Lygropia atrinervalis =

Species of moth

Lygropia atrinervalis is a moth in the family Crambidae. It was described by George Hampson in 1910. It is found in Zambia.
