= Lygropia bilinealis =

Scientific classification
- Kingdom: Animalia
- Phylum: Arthropoda
- Class: Insecta
- Order: Lepidoptera
- Family: Crambidae
- Genus: Lygropia
- Species: L. bilinealis

Binomial name
- Lygropia bilinealis (Walker, 1866)

Synonyms
- Caprinia bilinealis Walker, 1866

Species of moth

Lygropia bilinealis is a moth in the family Crambidae. It was described by Francis Walker in 1866. It is found in Colombia.
