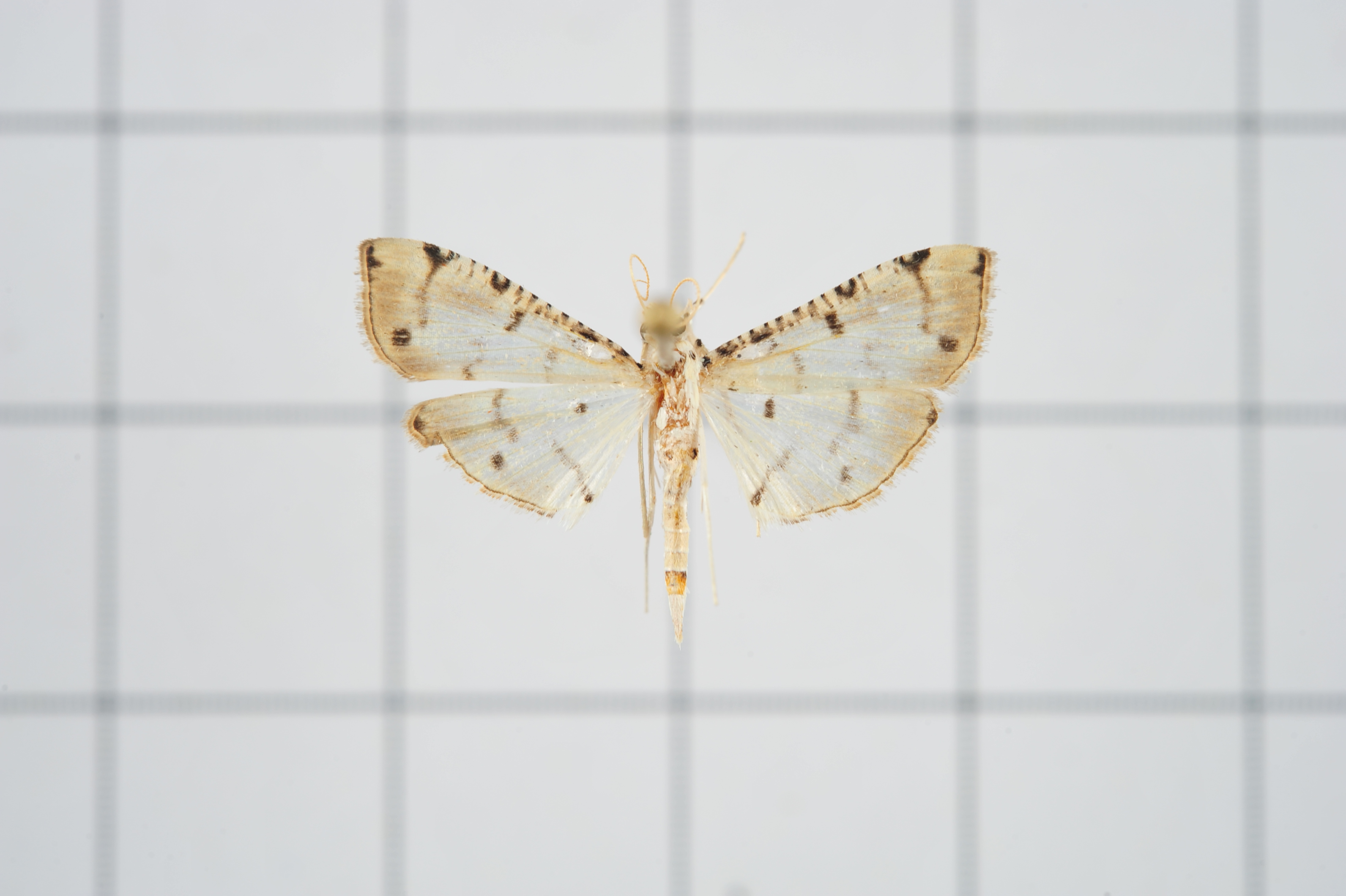

Scientific classification
- Domain: Eukaryota
- Kingdom: Animalia
- Phylum: Arthropoda
- Class: Insecta
- Order: Lepidoptera
- Family: Crambidae
- Genus: Pycnarmon
- Species: P. cribrata

Binomial name
- Pycnarmon cribrata (Fabricius, 1794)

Synonyms
- Conchylodes corycialis Snellen, 1880; Conchylodes privalis (Snellen, 1901); Entephria caberalis Guenée, 1854; Phalaena cribrata Fabricius, 1794; Pyralocymatophora frenulalis Strand, 1918; Zebronia abdicalis Walker, 1859

= Pycnarmon cribrata =

Species of moth

Pycnarmon cribrata is a moth of the family Crambidae. It is known from Kenya, Zambia, Sierra Leone, South Africa, Malawi, Mozambique, the Democratic Republic of the Congo, Zambia and Zimbabwe.

Known host plants of the larvae of this species are Embelia tsjeriam-cottam, Ocimum sanctum, Plectranthus parviflorus, Salvia coccinea, Solenstemon blumei and Vitex sp.
