= Pycnarmon argenticincta =

Scientific classification
- Kingdom: Animalia
- Phylum: Arthropoda
- Class: Insecta
- Order: Lepidoptera
- Family: Crambidae
- Genus: Pycnarmon
- Species: P. argenticincta

Binomial name
- Pycnarmon argenticincta (Hampson, 1899)

Synonyms
- Entephria argenticincta Hampson, 1899

Species of moth

Pycnarmon argenticincta is a moth in the family Crambidae. It was described by George Hampson in 1899. It is found on New Guinea.

The wingspan is about 22 mm (0.87 in). Adults are white, the forewings have an ochreous tinge and there are three basal black spots. There is an antemedial line arising from a black spot on the costa. Both wings have a prominent discocellular spot and a postmedial line from the costa to vein 5, then minutely dentate and at vein 2 retracted to below the angle of the cell. There is a marginal orange band with a black line on its inner edge, followed by a white line defined on the inner side with fuscous. There are also some marginal black specks.
