= Pycnarmon deicoonalis =

Scientific classification
- Kingdom: Animalia
- Phylum: Arthropoda
- Class: Insecta
- Order: Lepidoptera
- Family: Crambidae
- Genus: Pycnarmon
- Species: P. deicoonalis

Binomial name
- Pycnarmon deicoonalis (Walker, 1859)

Synonyms
- Zebronia deicoonalis Walker, 1859; Pycnarmon deiconalis

Species of moth

Pycnarmon deicoonalis is a moth in the family Crambidae. It is found in Brazil.
