= Pycnarmon argyria =

Scientific classification
- Domain: Eukaryota
- Kingdom: Animalia
- Phylum: Arthropoda
- Class: Insecta
- Order: Lepidoptera
- Family: Crambidae
- Genus: Pycnarmon
- Species: P. argyria

Binomial name
- Pycnarmon argyria (Butler, 1879)

Synonyms
- Zebronia argyria Butler, 1879

Species of moth

Pycnarmon argyria is a moth in the family Crambidae. It was described by Arthur Gardiner Butler in 1879. It is found in Hokkaido, Japan.
