= Lygropia yerburii =

Scientific classification
- Domain: Eukaryota
- Kingdom: Animalia
- Phylum: Arthropoda
- Class: Insecta
- Order: Lepidoptera
- Family: Crambidae
- Genus: Lygropia
- Species: L. yerburii

Binomial name
- Lygropia yerburii (Butler, 1886)

Synonyms
- Samea yerburii Butler, 1886

Species of moth

Lygropia yerburii is a moth in the family Crambidae. It was described by Arthur Gardiner Butler in 1886. It is found in Pakistan, Korea and Japan.

The wingspan is about 15 mm.

== Subspecies ==
- Lygropia yerburii yerburii
- Lygropia yerburii nipponica Inoue, 1986 (Japan)
