= Lygropia flavofuscalis =

Scientific classification
- Kingdom: Animalia
- Phylum: Arthropoda
- Class: Insecta
- Order: Lepidoptera
- Family: Crambidae
- Genus: Lygropia
- Species: L. flavofuscalis

Binomial name
- Lygropia flavofuscalis (Snellen, 1887)

Synonyms
- Isopteryx flavofuscalis Snellen, 1887

Species of moth

Lygropia flavofuscalis is a moth in the family Crambidae. It was described by Snellen in 1887. It is found in Colombia and on Curaçao.
