= Placosaris ingestalis =

Scientific classification
- Kingdom: Animalia
- Phylum: Arthropoda
- Class: Insecta
- Order: Lepidoptera
- Family: Crambidae
- Genus: Placosaris
- Species: P. ingestalis

Binomial name
- Placosaris ingestalis (Snellen, 1899)

Synonyms
- Botys ingestalis Snellen, 1899

Species of moth

Placosaris ingestalis is a moth in the family Crambidae. It was described by Snellen in 1899. It is found on Java.
