= Pycnarmon glaucias =

Scientific classification
- Kingdom: Animalia
- Phylum: Arthropoda
- Class: Insecta
- Order: Lepidoptera
- Family: Crambidae
- Genus: Pycnarmon
- Species: P. glaucias

Binomial name
- Pycnarmon glaucias (Meyrick, 1894)

Synonyms
- Aripana glaucias Meyrick, 1894

Species of moth

Pycnarmon glaucias is a moth in the family Crambidae. It was described by Edward Meyrick in 1894. It is found on the island of Borneo.

The wingspan of this species is about 28 mm (1.1 in). The forewings are white with a greyish-ochreous subcostal streak from the base to beyond the middle and black basal and subbasal dots on the costa. The lines are pale greyish ochreous, broad and fascia like. There is a round black discal spot and a black dot on the costa, and another, whitish centred, on the costal end of the second line. There is a pale greyish-ochreous hindmarginal streak, preceded by a black dot below middle. The hindwings are white with a black discal dot, the second line and posterior markings as in the forewings.
