= Pycnarmon pulchralis =

Scientific classification
- Domain: Eukaryota
- Kingdom: Animalia
- Phylum: Arthropoda
- Class: Insecta
- Order: Lepidoptera
- Family: Crambidae
- Genus: Pycnarmon
- Species: P. pulchralis

Binomial name
- Pycnarmon pulchralis (C. Swinhoe, 1901)

Synonyms
- Entephria pulchralis C. Swinhoe, 1901

Species of moth

Pycnarmon pulchralis is a moth in the family Crambidae. It was described by Charles Swinhoe in 1901. It is found in Myanmar.
