= Lygropia haroldi =

Scientific classification
- Domain: Eukaryota
- Kingdom: Animalia
- Phylum: Arthropoda
- Class: Insecta
- Order: Lepidoptera
- Family: Crambidae
- Genus: Lygropia
- Species: L. haroldi

Binomial name
- Lygropia haroldi Dyar, 1914

Species of insect

Lygropia haroldi is a moth in the family Crambidae. It is found in Guyana.

The wingspan is about 19 mm. The wings are black and slightly lustrous, the forewings with pale yellow markings, consisting of a broad, inner, slightly oblique band. There is a small speck at the tornus. The base of the hindwings are pale yellow, including a dark spot in the cell. There are some narrow yellow marginal markings.
