= Lygropia nigricornis =

Scientific classification
- Kingdom: Animalia
- Phylum: Arthropoda
- Clade: Pancrustacea
- Class: Insecta
- Order: Lepidoptera
- Family: Crambidae
- Genus: Lygropia
- Species: L. nigricornis

Binomial name
- Lygropia nigricornis Hampson, 1898

Species of moth

Lygropia nigricornis is a moth in the family Crambidae. It was described by George Hampson in 1898. It is found in Ethiopia and South Africa.
