= Lygropia cosmia =

Scientific classification
- Kingdom: Animalia
- Phylum: Arthropoda
- Class: Insecta
- Order: Lepidoptera
- Family: Crambidae
- Genus: Lygropia
- Species: L. cosmia

Binomial name
- Lygropia cosmia Dyar, 1914

Species of moth

Lygropia cosmia is a moth in the family Crambidae. It is found in Panama.

The wingspan is about 15 mm. The wings are bronzy brown-black, the forewings with a costal yellow half-bar on the outer fourth. There is a double spot in the cell, conjoined below and touching an oblique broad half-band near the base of the inner margin. The hindwings are yellow at the base.
