= Lygropia poltisalis =

Scientific classification
- Kingdom: Animalia
- Phylum: Arthropoda
- Clade: Pancrustacea
- Class: Insecta
- Order: Lepidoptera
- Family: Crambidae
- Genus: Lygropia
- Species: L. poltisalis

Binomial name
- Lygropia poltisalis (Walker, 1859)

Synonyms
- Botys poltisalis Walker, 1859

Species of moth

Lygropia poltisalis is a moth in the family Crambidae. Found on Borneo, it was described by Francis Walker in 1859.
