= Lygropia murinalis =

Scientific classification
- Domain: Eukaryota
- Kingdom: Animalia
- Phylum: Arthropoda
- Class: Insecta
- Order: Lepidoptera
- Family: Crambidae
- Genus: Lygropia
- Species: L. murinalis

Binomial name
- Lygropia murinalis Schaus, 1912

Species of moth

Lygropia murinalis is a moth in the family Crambidae. It was described by Schaus in 1912. It is found in Costa Rica.
