= Lygropia acosmialis =

Scientific classification
- Domain: Eukaryota
- Kingdom: Animalia
- Phylum: Arthropoda
- Class: Insecta
- Order: Lepidoptera
- Family: Crambidae
- Genus: Lygropia
- Species: L. acosmialis

Binomial name
- Lygropia acosmialis (Mabille, 1879)

Synonyms
- Botys acosmialis Mabille, 1879

Species of moth

Lygropia acosmialis is a moth in the family Crambidae. It was described by Paul Mabille in 1879. It is found in Madagascar and Zambia.
