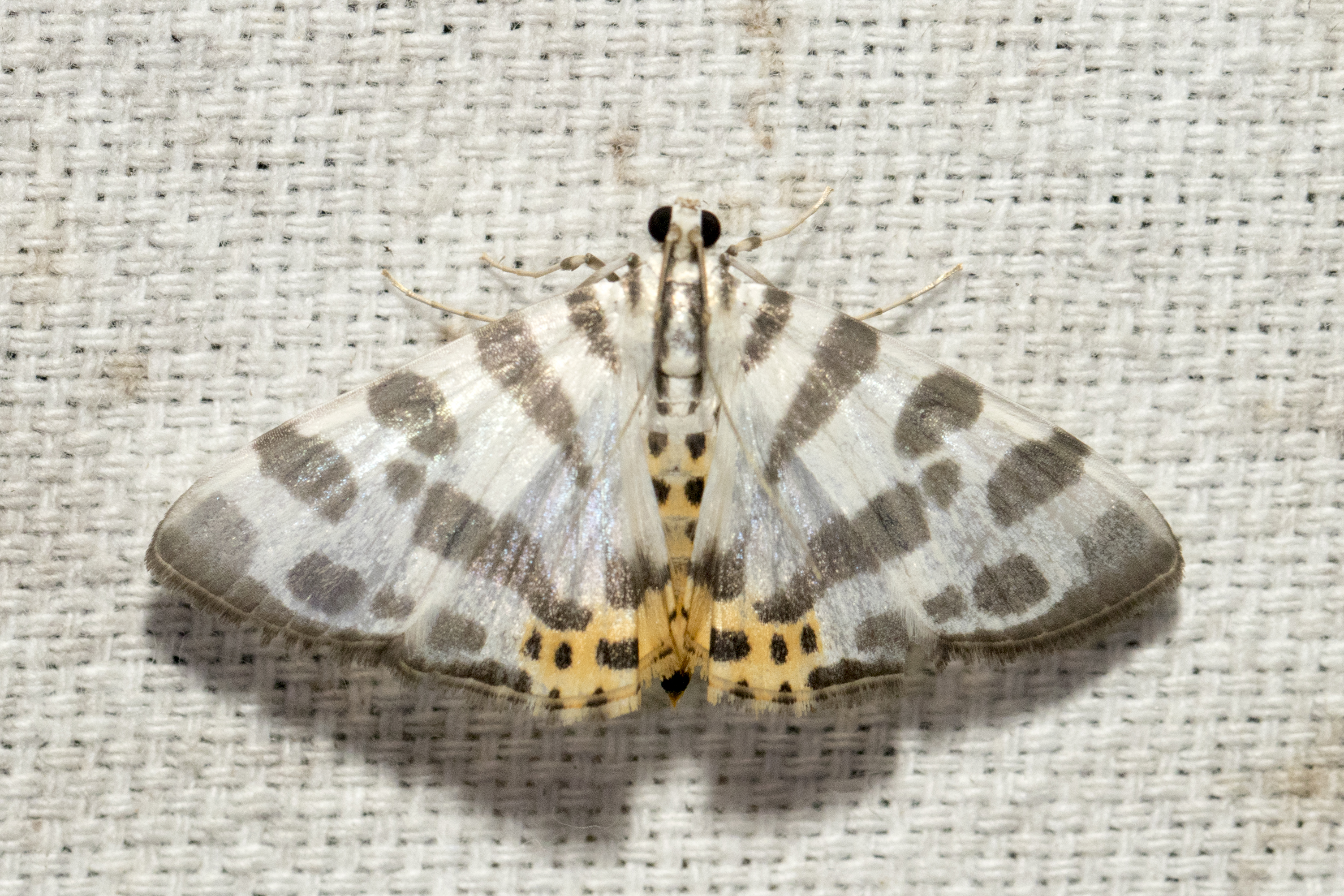

Scientific classification
- Kingdom: Animalia
- Phylum: Arthropoda
- Class: Insecta
- Order: Lepidoptera
- Family: Crambidae
- Genus: Pycnarmon
- Species: P. abraxalis

Binomial name
- Pycnarmon abraxalis (Walker, 1866)

Synonyms
- Zebronia abraxalis Walker, 1866

= Pycnarmon abraxalis =

Species of moth

Pycnarmon abraxalis is a moth in the family Crambidae. It was described by Francis Walker in 1866. It is found in Darjeeling in India and in Bhutan.
