= Pycnarmon idalis =

Scientific classification
- Kingdom: Animalia
- Phylum: Arthropoda
- Class: Insecta
- Order: Lepidoptera
- Family: Crambidae
- Genus: Pycnarmon
- Species: P. idalis

Binomial name
- Pycnarmon idalis (Walker, 1859)

Synonyms
- Zebronia idalis Walker, 1859

Species of moth

Pycnarmon idalis is a moth in the family Crambidae. It was described by Francis Walker in 1859. It is found on Borneo.
