= Pycnarmon albivittalis =

Scientific classification
- Kingdom: Animalia
- Phylum: Arthropoda
- Class: Insecta
- Order: Lepidoptera
- Family: Crambidae
- Genus: Pycnarmon
- Species: P. albivittalis

Binomial name
- Pycnarmon albivittalis (Hampson, 1912)

Synonyms
- Entephria albivittalis Hampson, 1912; Pycnarmon albivittale Vári, Kroon & Krüger, 2002

Species of moth

Pycnarmon albivittalis is a moth in the family Crambidae. It was described by George Hampson in 1912. It is found in South Africa.
