= Pycnarmon tapeina =

Scientific classification
- Domain: Eukaryota
- Kingdom: Animalia
- Phylum: Arthropoda
- Class: Insecta
- Order: Lepidoptera
- Family: Crambidae
- Genus: Pycnarmon
- Species: P. tapeina

Binomial name
- Pycnarmon tapeina Ghesquière, 1940

Species of moth

Pycnarmon tapeina is a moth in the family Crambidae. It was described by Jean Ghesquière in 1940. It is found in the area of the former province Équateur in the Democratic Republic of the Congo.
