= Pycnarmon macrotis =

Scientific classification
- Domain: Eukaryota
- Kingdom: Animalia
- Phylum: Arthropoda
- Class: Insecta
- Order: Lepidoptera
- Family: Crambidae
- Genus: Pycnarmon
- Species: P. macrotis

Binomial name
- Pycnarmon macrotis (Meyrick, 1897)

Synonyms
- Aripana macrotis Meyrick, 1897

Species of moth

Pycnarmon macrotis is a moth in the family Crambidae. It was described by Edward Meyrick in 1897. It is found in the Talaut Islands of Indonesia.

The wingspan is about 26 mm. The forewings are white, but ochreous tinged towards the base and on the costal streak. There are small black basal and subbasal dots on the costa, as well as a small black discal dot, a small transverse oval black discal spot in the middle and a small black costal dot. The second line is fuscous, indistinct and blackish on the costa. It is broken and interrupted in the disc and followed by a pale yellowish shade. There is a large black dot towards the termen below the middle and a small blackish apical dot. The hindwings are white with a dark fuscous discal dot. The second line is as in the forewings, but marked with a dark fuscous dot on the dorsum. There is also a subterminal dot.
