= Pycnarmon aripanalis =

Scientific classification
- Kingdom: Animalia
- Phylum: Arthropoda
- Class: Insecta
- Order: Lepidoptera
- Family: Crambidae
- Genus: Pycnarmon
- Species: P. aripanalis

Binomial name
- Pycnarmon aripanalis (Hampson, 1899)

Synonyms
- Metrea aripanalis Hampson, 1899

Species of moth

Pycnarmon aripanalis is a moth in the family Crambidae. It was described by George Hampson in 1899. It is found in Australia, where it has been recorded from Queensland.

The wingspan is about 22 mm. Adults are white, the forewings with a black spot at the base of the costa and a subbasal series of three spots. The antemedial line is represented by spots on the costa and the inner margin. There is a speck towards the end of the cell and a large discoidal spot. The postmedial line is sinuous and has spots on the costa and inner margin. There is a dentate subterminal line developing into a spot in the middle, as well as a terminal series of points. The hindwings have a black discoidal spot and a sinuous postmedial line, as well as a terminal series of points.
