= Pycnarmon diaphana =

Scientific classification
- Domain: Eukaryota
- Kingdom: Animalia
- Phylum: Arthropoda
- Class: Insecta
- Order: Lepidoptera
- Family: Crambidae
- Genus: Pycnarmon
- Species: P. diaphana

Binomial name
- Pycnarmon diaphana (Cramer, 1777)

Synonyms
- Phalaena Pyralis diaphana Cramer, 1777

Species of moth

Pycnarmon diaphana is a moth in the family Crambidae. It was described by Pieter Cramer in 1777. It is found in Cameroon, the Democratic Republic of the Congo (Equateur, Katanga, Bas Congo, West Kasai), Equatorial Guinea, Ethiopia, Seychelles (Mahé, North), Sierra Leone, South Africa, Zambia, Zimbabwe, India and Sri Lanka.

The larvae feed on Sideroxylon ferrugineum.
