= Pycnarmon decipiens =

Scientific classification
- Domain: Eukaryota
- Kingdom: Animalia
- Phylum: Arthropoda
- Class: Insecta
- Order: Lepidoptera
- Family: Crambidae
- Genus: Pycnarmon
- Species: P. decipiens

Binomial name
- Pycnarmon decipiens Munroe, 1958

Species of moth

Pycnarmon decipiens is a moth in the family Crambidae. It was described by Eugene G. Munroe in 1958. It is found on Mindanao in the Philippines.
