= Pycnarmon crocalis =

Scientific classification
- Kingdom: Animalia
- Phylum: Arthropoda
- Class: Insecta
- Order: Lepidoptera
- Family: Crambidae
- Genus: Pycnarmon
- Species: P. crocalis

Binomial name
- Pycnarmon crocalis (Hampson, 1899)

Synonyms
- Entephria crocalis Hampson, 1899

Species of moth

Pycnarmon crocalis is a moth in the family Crambidae. It was described by George Hampson in 1899. It is found in Papua New Guinea, where it has been recorded from the D'Entrecasteaux Islands (Fergusson Island).

The wingspan is about 22 mm. Adults are golden yellow, the forewings with a purplish-fuscous costal half and a dark point on the base of the inner margin. There is a curved antemedial black line. There is a wedge-shaped yellow mark on the costa. The hindwings have a discoidal point and a sinuous series of points that represent the postmedial line. There is also a purplish-fuscous apical patch.
