= Pycnarmon lactiferalis =

Scientific classification
- Domain: Eukaryota
- Kingdom: Animalia
- Phylum: Arthropoda
- Class: Insecta
- Order: Lepidoptera
- Family: Crambidae
- Genus: Pycnarmon
- Species: P. lactiferalis

Binomial name
- Pycnarmon lactiferalis (Walker, 1859)

Synonyms
- Zebronia lactiferalis Walker, 1859; Aripana lactiferalis ab. apicipicta Strand, 1918

Species of moth

Pycnarmon lactiferalis is a moth in the family Crambidae. It was described by Francis Walker in 1859. It is found in the Russian Far East, Japan, China, India and Taiwan.

The length of the forewings is about 10 mm.
