= Lygropia hyalostictalis =

Scientific classification
- Kingdom: Animalia
- Phylum: Arthropoda
- Class: Insecta
- Order: Lepidoptera
- Family: Crambidae
- Genus: Lygropia
- Species: L. hyalostictalis

Binomial name
- Lygropia hyalostictalis Hampson, 1912

Species of moth

Lygropia hyalostictalis is a moth in the family Crambidae. It was described by George Hampson in 1912. It is found in Nigeria.
