= Placosaris turiusalis =

Scientific classification
- Kingdom: Animalia
- Phylum: Arthropoda
- Class: Insecta
- Order: Lepidoptera
- Family: Crambidae
- Genus: Placosaris
- Species: P. turiusalis

Binomial name
- Placosaris turiusalis Walker, 1859

Synonyms
- Botys broesialis Walker, 1859; Pachyzancla miniatalis Swinhoe, 1906

Species of moth

Placosaris turiusalis is a moth in the family Crambidae. It was described by Francis Walker in 1859. It is found on Borneo and Sumatra.
