= Lygropia flavicaput =

Scientific classification
- Domain: Eukaryota
- Kingdom: Animalia
- Phylum: Arthropoda
- Class: Insecta
- Order: Lepidoptera
- Family: Crambidae
- Genus: Lygropia
- Species: L. flavicaput

Binomial name
- Lygropia flavicaput (Warren, 1896)

Synonyms
- Hyperthalia flavicaput Warren, 1896

Species of moth

Lygropia flavicaput is a moth in the family Crambidae. It was described by Warren in 1896. It is found in India (Assam).
