= Pycnarmon nebulosalis =

Scientific classification
- Kingdom: Animalia
- Phylum: Arthropoda
- Class: Insecta
- Order: Lepidoptera
- Family: Crambidae
- Genus: Pycnarmon
- Species: P. nebulosalis

Binomial name
- Pycnarmon nebulosalis Hampson, 1896

Species of moth

Pycnarmon nebulosalis is a moth in the family Crambidae. It was described by George Hampson in 1896. It is found in Sri Lanka.

The wingspan is about 18 mm. Adults are white, thickly mottled with brown. The forewings are brown, except for some white specks near the base, a patch in the cell, an apical patch and a spot at the middle of the outer margin. There are traces of a dark waved antemedial line and there is a dark-edged white discocellular spot, as well as a dark-waved postmedial line defined by white and bent outwards between veins 7 and 4. There is also a dark marginal line. The hindwings have a white basal area and a fuscous discocellular spot. There is an irregularly waved postmedial line defined by white and with some diffused fuscous on its inner edge and there is a dark marginal line with some dentate white marks on its inner edge.
