= Lygropia szentivanyi =

Scientific classification
- Domain: Eukaryota
- Kingdom: Animalia
- Phylum: Arthropoda
- Class: Insecta
- Order: Lepidoptera
- Family: Crambidae
- Genus: Lygropia
- Species: L. szentivanyi

Binomial name
- Lygropia szentivanyi (Munroe, 1968)

Synonyms
- Haritala szentivanyi Munroe, 1968

Species of moth

Lygropia szentivanyi is a moth in the family Crambidae. It was described by Eugene G. Munroe in 1968. It is found in Papua New Guinea.
