= Furcivena =

Scientific classification
- Kingdom: Animalia
- Phylum: Arthropoda
- Class: Insecta
- Order: Lepidoptera
- Family: Crambidae
- Genus: Furcivena; Hampson, 1896

Genus of moths

Furcivena is a genus of moths of the family Crambidae.

== Species ==
- Furcivena cyanoxantha Meyrick, 1933
- Furcivena dialithalis Hampson, 1917
- Furcivena euclidialis (Hampson, 1906)
- Furcivena rhodoneurialis Hampson, 1898
- Furcivena strigiferalis Hampson, 1896
