= Pycnarmon sciophila =

Scientific classification
- Domain: Eukaryota
- Kingdom: Animalia
- Phylum: Arthropoda
- Class: Insecta
- Order: Lepidoptera
- Family: Crambidae
- Genus: Pycnarmon
- Species: P. sciophila

Binomial name
- Pycnarmon sciophila Ghesquière, 1940

Species of moth

Pycnarmon sciophila is a moth in the family Crambidae. It was described by Jean Ghesquière in 1940. It is found in the area of the former province Équateur in the Democratic Republic of the Congo.
