= Lygropia silacealis =

Scientific classification
- Domain: Eukaryota
- Kingdom: Animalia
- Phylum: Arthropoda
- Class: Insecta
- Order: Lepidoptera
- Family: Crambidae
- Genus: Lygropia
- Species: L. silacealis

Binomial name
- Lygropia silacealis (Amsel, 1956)

Synonyms
- Syllepta silacealis Amsel, 1956

Species of moth

Lygropia silacealis is a moth in the family Crambidae. It was described by Hans Georg Amsel in 1956 and is found in Venezuela.
