= Pycnarmon annulalis =

Scientific classification
- Domain: Eukaryota
- Kingdom: Animalia
- Phylum: Arthropoda
- Class: Insecta
- Order: Lepidoptera
- Family: Crambidae
- Genus: Pycnarmon
- Species: P. annulalis

Binomial name
- Pycnarmon annulalis (Dognin, 1906)

Synonyms
- Stenia annulalis Dognin, 1906

Species of moth

Pycnarmon annulalis is a moth in the family Crambidae. It was described by Paul Dognin in 1906. It is found in Peru.
