= Placosaris apoalis =

Scientific classification
- Domain: Eukaryota
- Kingdom: Animalia
- Phylum: Arthropoda
- Class: Insecta
- Order: Lepidoptera
- Family: Crambidae
- Genus: Placosaris
- Species: P. apoalis

Binomial name
- Placosaris apoalis Munroe & Mutuura, 1970

Species of moth

Placosaris apoalis is a moth in the family Crambidae. It was described by Eugene G. Munroe and Akira Mutuura in 1970. It is found on Mindanao in the Philippines.
