= Furcivena cyanoxantha =

Scientific classification
- Kingdom: Animalia
- Phylum: Arthropoda
- Class: Insecta
- Order: Lepidoptera
- Family: Crambidae
- Genus: Furcivena
- Species: F. cyanoxantha

Binomial name
- Furcivena cyanoxantha (Meyrick, 1933)

Synonyms
- Hypolamprus cyanoxantha Meyrick, 1933

Species of moth

Furcivena cyanoxantha is a moth in the family Crambidae. It was described by Edward Meyrick in 1933. It is found in the Democratic Republic of the Congo.
