= Lygropia ochracealis =

Scientific classification
- Kingdom: Animalia
- Phylum: Arthropoda
- Clade: Pancrustacea
- Class: Insecta
- Order: Lepidoptera
- Family: Crambidae
- Genus: Lygropia
- Species: L. ochracealis

Binomial name
- Lygropia ochracealis (Saalmüller, 1880)

Synonyms
- Botys ochracealis Saalmüller, 1880; Lygropia seyrigalis Viette, 1953

Species of moth

Lygropia ochracealis is a moth of the family Crambidae described by Max Saalmüller in 1880. It is found on Madagascar.

This species is of yolk-yellow colour with blackish-brown markings. The wingspan of this species is about 28 mm.
