= Lygropia unicoloralis =

Scientific classification
- Kingdom: Animalia
- Phylum: Arthropoda
- Class: Insecta
- Order: Lepidoptera
- Family: Crambidae
- Genus: Lygropia
- Species: L. unicoloralis

Binomial name
- Lygropia unicoloralis (Guenée, 1854)

Synonyms
- Asopia unicoloralis Guenée, 1854

Species of moth

Lygropia unicoloralis is a moth in the family Crambidae. It was described by Achille Guenée in 1854. It is found in Brazil.
