= Lygropia rheumatica =

Scientific classification
- Kingdom: Animalia
- Phylum: Arthropoda
- Class: Insecta
- Order: Lepidoptera
- Family: Crambidae
- Genus: Lygropia
- Species: L. rheumatica

Binomial name
- Lygropia rheumatica Meyrick, 1936

Species of moth

Lygropia rheumatica is a moth in the family Crambidae. It was described by Edward Meyrick in 1936. It is found in the Democratic Republic of the Congo.
