= Lygropia glaphyra =

Scientific classification
- Domain: Eukaryota
- Kingdom: Animalia
- Phylum: Arthropoda
- Class: Insecta
- Order: Lepidoptera
- Family: Crambidae
- Genus: Lygropia
- Species: L. glaphyra

Binomial name
- Lygropia glaphyra Dyar, 1914

Species of moth

Lygropia glaphyra is a moth in the family Crambidae. It is found in French Guiana.

The wingspan is about 13 mm. The forewings are bronzy brown-black with a small yellow costal spot at the outer third. There is a narrow band at the basal third. The hindwings are yellow at the base.
