= Furcivena strigiferalis =

Scientific classification
- Kingdom: Animalia
- Phylum: Arthropoda
- Class: Insecta
- Order: Lepidoptera
- Family: Crambidae
- Genus: Furcivena
- Species: F. strigiferalis

Binomial name
- Furcivena strigiferalis Hampson, 1896

Species of moth

Furcivena strigiferalis is a moth in the family Crambidae. It was described by George Hampson in 1896. It is found in Sikkim, India.
