= Pycnarmon staminalis =

Scientific classification
- Kingdom: Animalia
- Phylum: Arthropoda
- Class: Insecta
- Order: Lepidoptera
- Family: Crambidae
- Genus: Pycnarmon
- Species: P. staminalis

Binomial name
- Pycnarmon staminalis (Hampson, 1912)

Synonyms
- Entephria staminalis Hampson, 1912

Species of moth

Pycnarmon staminalis is a moth in the family Crambidae. It was described by George Hampson in 1912. It is found in Guatemala.
