= Pycnarmon peruvialis =

Scientific classification
- Kingdom: Animalia
- Phylum: Arthropoda
- Class: Insecta
- Order: Lepidoptera
- Family: Crambidae
- Genus: Pycnarmon
- Species: P. peruvialis

Binomial name
- Pycnarmon peruvialis Hampson, 1917

Species of moth

Pycnarmon peruvialis is a moth in the family Crambidae. It was described by George Hampson in 1917 and it is found in Peru.

The wingspan is 22–26 mm. The forewings are silvery white with small black-brown spots on the costa and near the base, the latter followed by three or four minute spots on the costa. There is an antemedial black point in the cell and discoidal striga, the latter with a slight black-brown annulus above it on the costa, as well as a faint brownish-ochreous line from the origin of vein 2 to the inner margin. There is also a brownish-ochreous shade beyond the cell and an ochreous-brown postmedial line with two black-brown striae at the costa. There is a black point at the apex and an elliptical brownish-ochreous patch on the termen, as well as a black striga before the termen at vein 3. The hindwings are silvery white with a black discoidal bar, a postmedial line with a black spot at the costa, which then becomes brownish ochreous. There is also a blackish striga on vein 3 before the termen and a slight ochreous-brown terminal line.
