= Lygropia pogonodes =

Scientific classification
- Kingdom: Animalia
- Phylum: Arthropoda
- Class: Insecta
- Order: Lepidoptera
- Family: Crambidae
- Genus: Lygropia
- Species: L. pogonodes

Binomial name
- Lygropia pogonodes Hampson, 1912

Species of moth

Lygropia pogonodes is a moth in the family Crambidae. It was described by George Hampson in 1912. It is found in Burundi, Nigeria, South Africa and Tanzania.
