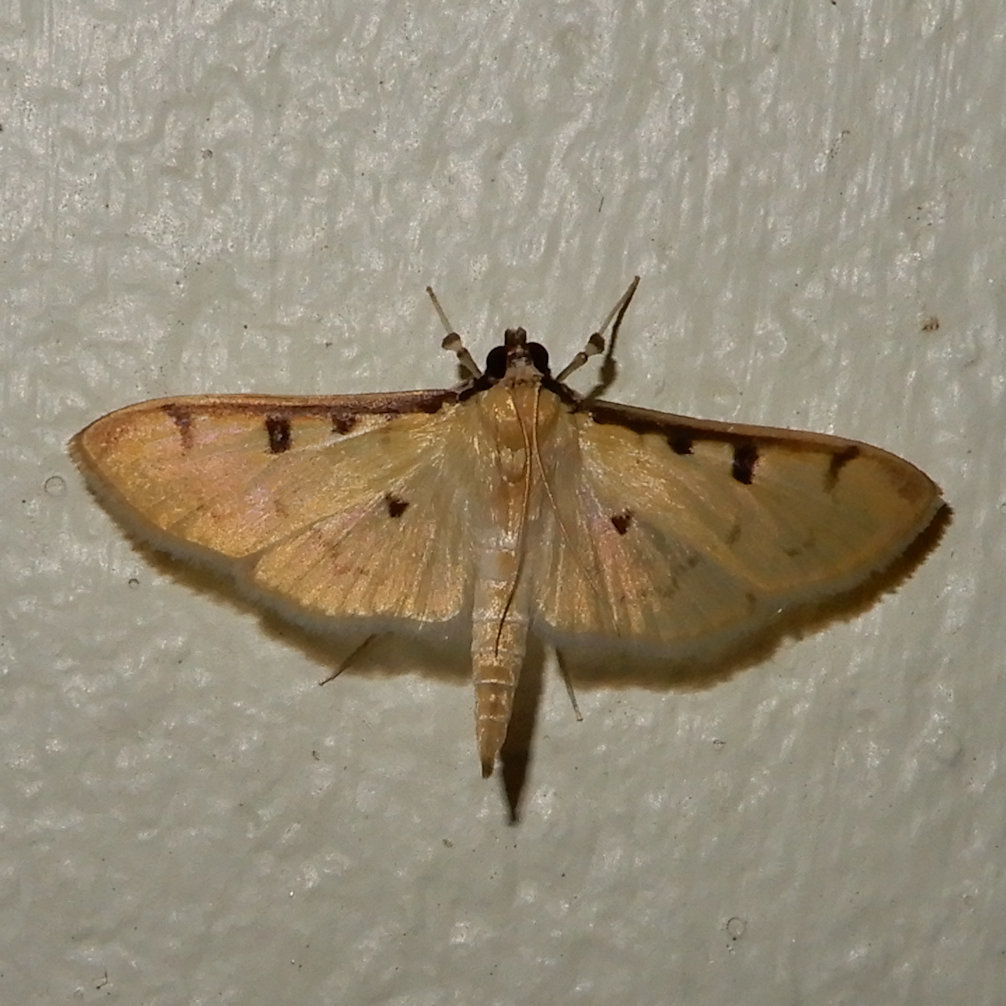

Scientific classification
- Domain: Eukaryota
- Kingdom: Animalia
- Phylum: Arthropoda
- Class: Insecta
- Order: Lepidoptera
- Family: Crambidae
- Genus: Lygropia
- Species: L. tripunctata

Binomial name
- Lygropia tripunctata (Fabricius, 1794)

Synonyms
- List: Phalaena tripunctata Fabricius, 1794; Pilocrocis tripunctata; Botys campalis Guenée, 1854; Botys cubanalis Guenée, 1854; Botys memmialis Walker, 1859

= Lygropia tripunctata =

Species of moth

Lygropia tripunctata, commonly known as the sweetpotato leafroller, is a species of moth in the family Crambidae. It was first described by Johan Christian Fabricius in 1794. It is found in the United States, where it has been recorded from Texas to South Carolina and Florida. It is also found from the West Indies and Central America to Brazil.

== Description ==
Lygropia tripunctata is primarily grayish-brown, with light yellow wings. It has a wingspan of around 26 mm and three distinct black dots along its back.

== Behaviour and ecology ==
The larvae feed on Turbina corymbosa, Merremia umbellata and Ipomoea species, and adults tend to be most active from March to October.
