= Lygropia aureomarginalis =

Scientific classification
- Domain: Eukaryota
- Kingdom: Animalia
- Phylum: Arthropoda
- Class: Insecta
- Order: Lepidoptera
- Family: Crambidae
- Genus: Lygropia
- Species: L. aureomarginalis

Binomial name
- Lygropia aureomarginalis (Gaede, 1916)

Synonyms
- Leucinodes aureomarginalis Gaede, 1916

Species of moth

Lygropia aureomarginalis is a moth in the family Crambidae found in Cameroon. It was described by Max Gaede in 1916.
