= Pycnarmon diffusalis =

Scientific classification
- Kingdom: Animalia
- Phylum: Arthropoda
- Class: Insecta
- Order: Lepidoptera
- Family: Crambidae
- Genus: Pycnarmon
- Species: P. diffusalis

Binomial name
- Pycnarmon diffusalis Hampson, 1917

Synonyms
- Pycnarmon spodosticta Ghesquière, 1940

Species of moth

Pycnarmon diffusalis is a moth in the family Crambidae. It was described by George Hampson in 1917. It is found in the Democratic Republic of the Congo (Katanga) and Malawi.
