= Pycnarmon dichocrocidalis =

Scientific classification
- Domain: Eukaryota
- Kingdom: Animalia
- Phylum: Arthropoda
- Class: Insecta
- Order: Lepidoptera
- Family: Crambidae
- Genus: Pycnarmon
- Species: P. dichocrocidalis

Binomial name
- Pycnarmon dichocrocidalis (Strand, 1918)

Synonyms
- Aripana dichocrocidalis Strand, 1918

Species of moth

Pycnarmon dichocrocidalis is a moth in the family Crambidae . It was described by Embrik Strand in 1918. It is found in Taiwan.
