= Lygropia tetraspilalis =

Scientific classification
- Kingdom: Animalia
- Phylum: Arthropoda
- Clade: Pancrustacea
- Class: Insecta
- Order: Lepidoptera
- Family: Crambidae
- Genus: Lygropia
- Species: L. tetraspilalis

Binomial name
- Lygropia tetraspilalis Hampson, 1912

Species of moth

Lygropia tetraspilalis is a moth in the family Crambidae. It was described by George Hampson in 1912. It is found in South Africa.
