= Pycnarmon juanalis =

Scientific classification
- Domain: Eukaryota
- Kingdom: Animalia
- Phylum: Arthropoda
- Class: Insecta
- Order: Lepidoptera
- Family: Crambidae
- Genus: Pycnarmon
- Species: P. juanalis

Binomial name
- Pycnarmon juanalis Schaus, 1933

Species of moth

Pycnarmon juanalis is a moth in the family Crambidae. It is found in Brazil (São Paulo).
