= Lygropia falsalis =

Scientific classification
- Kingdom: Animalia
- Phylum: Arthropoda
- Class: Insecta
- Order: Lepidoptera
- Family: Crambidae
- Genus: Lygropia
- Species: L. falsalis

Binomial name
- Lygropia falsalis Dyar, 1918

Species of moth

Lygropia falsalis is a moth in the family Crambidae. It was described by Harrison Gray Dyar Jr. in 1918. It is found in Mexico.

The wingspan is about 19 mm. The forewings are pale subhyaline yellow with a purple-brown costa. There is a spot in the base of the cell. The outer margin is purple brown at the apex. The hindwings have a purple-brown border and a round black discal dot.
