= Pycnarmon leucodoce =

Scientific classification
- Kingdom: Animalia
- Phylum: Arthropoda
- Class: Insecta
- Order: Lepidoptera
- Family: Crambidae
- Genus: Pycnarmon
- Species: P. leucodoce

Binomial name
- Pycnarmon leucodoce Meyrick, 1936

Species of moth

Pycnarmon leucodoce is a moth in the family Crambidae. It was described by Edward Meyrick in 1936. It is found in the former provinces of Équateur and Katanga in the Democratic Republic of the Congo.

The larvae feed on Stipularia africana.
