= Pycnarmon cecinalis =

Scientific classification
- Domain: Eukaryota
- Kingdom: Animalia
- Phylum: Arthropoda
- Class: Insecta
- Order: Lepidoptera
- Family: Crambidae
- Genus: Pycnarmon
- Species: P. cecinalis

Binomial name
- Pycnarmon cecinalis (Dognin, 1897)

Synonyms
- Leucochroma cecinalis Dognin, 1897

Species of moth

Pycnarmon cecinalis is a moth in the family Crambidae. It is found in Ecuador (Loja Province) and Honduras.
