= Auxolophotis ioxanthias =

Scientific classification
- Domain: Eukaryota
- Kingdom: Animalia
- Phylum: Arthropoda
- Class: Insecta
- Order: Lepidoptera
- Family: Crambidae
- Genus: Auxolophotis
- Species: A. ioxanthias

Binomial name
- Auxolophotis ioxanthias Meyrick, 1933

Species of moth

Auxolophotis ioxanthias is a moth in the family Crambidae. It was described by Edward Meyrick in 1933. It is found on Fiji.
