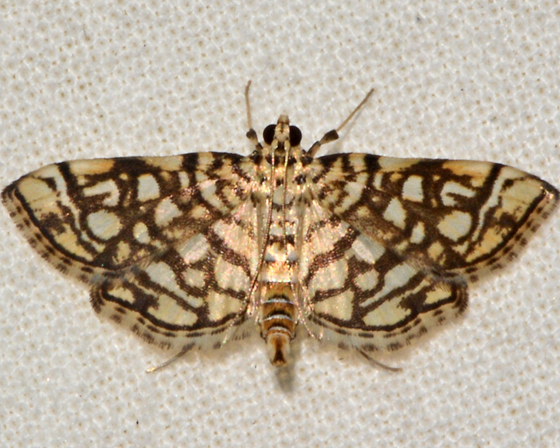

Scientific classification
- Kingdom: Animalia
- Phylum: Arthropoda
- Class: Insecta
- Order: Lepidoptera
- Family: Crambidae
- Genus: Lygropia
- Species: L. rivulalis

Binomial name
- Lygropia rivulalis Hampson, 1899

= Lygropia rivulalis =

Species of moth

Lygropia rivulalis, the bog lygropia moth, is a moth of the family Crambidae. It is found in North America, where it has been recorded from Arizona, California, Illinois, Indiana, Iowa, Kentucky, Maine, Maryland, Massachusetts, Michigan, Minnesota, New Hampshire, New Jersey, New York, North Carolina, North Dakota, Ohio, Oklahoma, Ontario, Pennsylvania, Quebec, South Carolina, Tennessee, West Virginia and Wisconsin. The habitat consists of boggy or wet areas.

This wingspan is about 17 mm. Adults are on wing from April to October.
