= Lygropia flavinotalis =

Scientific classification
- Kingdom: Animalia
- Phylum: Arthropoda
- Class: Insecta
- Order: Lepidoptera
- Family: Crambidae
- Genus: Lygropia
- Species: L. flavinotalis

Binomial name
- Lygropia flavinotalis Hampson, 1912

Species of moth

Lygropia flavinotalis is a moth in the family Crambidae. It was described by George Hampson in 1912. It is found in Nigeria.
