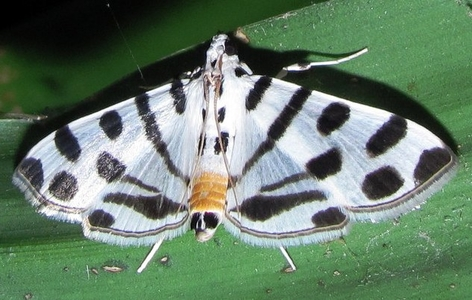

Scientific classification
- Kingdom: Animalia
- Phylum: Arthropoda
- Class: Insecta
- Order: Lepidoptera
- Family: Crambidae
- Genus: Pycnarmon
- Species: P. jaguaralis

Binomial name
- Pycnarmon jaguaralis (Guenée, 1854)

Synonyms
- Spilomela jaguaralis Guenée, 1854

= Pycnarmon jaguaralis =

Species of moth

Pycnarmon jaguaralis is a moth in the family Crambidae. It was described by Achille Guenée in 1854. It is found in Australia, Papua New Guinea, Indonesia (Seram), the Himalayas, India (Assam), Bhutan and from Malaysia to the Solomon Islands.

Adults are white with streaky black spots.

== Subspecies ==
- Pycnarmon jaguaralis jaguaralis
- Pycnarmon jaguaralis papualis Munroe, 1958 (Papua New Guinea)
