= Furcivena rhodoneurialis =

Scientific classification
- Kingdom: Animalia
- Phylum: Arthropoda
- Clade: Pancrustacea
- Class: Insecta
- Order: Lepidoptera
- Family: Crambidae
- Genus: Furcivena
- Species: F. rhodoneurialis

Binomial name
- Furcivena rhodoneurialis Hampson, 1898

Species of moth

Furcivena rhodoneurialis is a moth in the family Crambidae. It was described by George Hampson in 1898. It is found in Nigeria.
