= Pycnarmon sericea =

Scientific classification
- Domain: Eukaryota
- Kingdom: Animalia
- Phylum: Arthropoda
- Class: Insecta
- Order: Lepidoptera
- Family: Crambidae
- Genus: Pycnarmon
- Species: P. sericea

Binomial name
- Pycnarmon sericea Ghesquière, 1940

Species of moth

Pycnarmon sericea is a moth in the family Crambidae. It was described by Jean Ghesquière in 1940. It is found in South Kivu in the Democratic Republic of the Congo.
