= Lygropia xanthozonalis =

Scientific classification
- Kingdom: Animalia
- Phylum: Arthropoda
- Class: Insecta
- Order: Lepidoptera
- Family: Crambidae
- Genus: Lygropia
- Species: L. xanthozonalis

Binomial name
- Lygropia xanthozonalis (Hampson, 1895)

Synonyms
- Haritala xanthozonalis Hampson, 1895

Species of moth

Lygropia xanthozonalis is a moth in the family Crambidae. It is found in Grenada.
