= Lygropia arenacea =

Scientific classification
- Kingdom: Animalia
- Phylum: Arthropoda
- Clade: Pancrustacea
- Class: Insecta
- Order: Lepidoptera
- Family: Crambidae
- Genus: Lygropia
- Species: L. arenacea

Binomial name
- Lygropia arenacea Hampson, 1899

Species of moth

Lygropia arenacea is a moth in the family Crambidae described by George Hampson in 1899. It is found in Paraná, Brazil.
