= Pycnarmon quinquepuncta =

Scientific classification
- Domain: Eukaryota
- Kingdom: Animalia
- Phylum: Arthropoda
- Class: Insecta
- Order: Lepidoptera
- Family: Crambidae
- Genus: Pycnarmon
- Species: P. quinquepuncta

Binomial name
- Pycnarmon quinquepuncta (C. Swinhoe, 1904)

Synonyms
- Xanthomelaina quinquepuncta C. Swinhoe, 1904

Species of moth

Pycnarmon quinquepuncta is a moth in the family Crambidae. It was described by Charles Swinhoe in 1904. It is found on Borneo.

The wings are semihyaline (almost glass like) pale yellow, the forewings with three large black spots in the shape of a triangle, one below the middle of the costa and the other two above the hindmargin. The hindwings have two similar spots.
