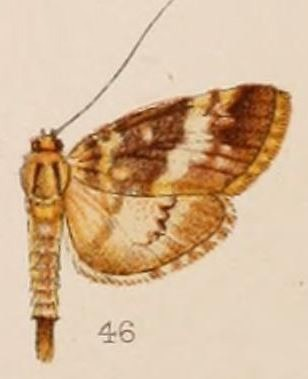
- Lygropia shevaroyalis

Scientific classification
- Kingdom: Animalia
- Phylum: Arthropoda
- Class: Insecta
- Order: Lepidoptera
- Family: Crambidae
- Genus: Lygropia
- Species: L. shevaroyalis

Binomial name
- Lygropia shevaroyalis Hampson, 1908

= Lygropia shevaroyalis =

Species of moth

Lygropia shevaroyalis is a moth of the family Crambidae. It is found in southern India.

This species has a wingspan of 34 mm.
