= Pycnarmon orophila =

Scientific classification
- Domain: Eukaryota
- Kingdom: Animalia
- Phylum: Arthropoda
- Class: Insecta
- Order: Lepidoptera
- Family: Crambidae
- Genus: Pycnarmon
- Species: P. orophila

Binomial name
- Pycnarmon orophila Ghesquière, 1940

Species of moth

Pycnarmon orophila is a moth in the family Crambidae. It was described by Jean Ghesquière in 1940. It is found in the area of the former province of Orientale in the Democratic Republic of the Congo.
