= Lygropia joelalis =

Scientific classification
- Domain: Eukaryota
- Kingdom: Animalia
- Phylum: Arthropoda
- Class: Insecta
- Order: Lepidoptera
- Family: Crambidae
- Genus: Lygropia
- Species: L. joelalis

Binomial name
- Lygropia joelalis Schaus, 1940

Species of moth

Lygropia joelalis is a moth in the family Crambidae. It was described by Schaus in 1940. It is found in Puerto Rico.

The wingspan is about 12 mm. The wings are light brownish drab, the hindwings buff yellow at the base.
