= Pycnarmon sarumalis =

Scientific classification
- Domain: Eukaryota
- Kingdom: Animalia
- Phylum: Arthropoda
- Class: Insecta
- Order: Lepidoptera
- Family: Crambidae
- Genus: Pycnarmon
- Species: P. sarumalis

Binomial name
- Pycnarmon sarumalis (Holland, 1900)

Synonyms
- Entephria sarumalis Holland, 1900

Species of moth

Pycnarmon sarumalis is a moth in the family Crambidae. It was described by William Jacob Holland in 1900. It is found in Buru, Indonesia.

The wingspan is about 21 mm. The wings are shining white, crossed by a subbasal transverse brown line. There is a pale linear brown line at the end of the cell, with below it a similar brown line, and just beyond the latter, on the inner margin about its outer third, a well-defined black point. A narrow brown line runs from the costa before the apex toward the inner angle. The hindwings are traversed by an irregularly curved narrow pale brown median transverse line.
