= Pycnarmon obinusalis =

Scientific classification
- Kingdom: Animalia
- Phylum: Arthropoda
- Class: Insecta
- Order: Lepidoptera
- Family: Crambidae
- Genus: Pycnarmon
- Species: P. obinusalis

Binomial name
- Pycnarmon obinusalis (Walker, 1859)

Synonyms
- Astura obinusalis Walker, 1859

Species of moth

Pycnarmon obinusalis is a moth in the family Crambidae. It was described by Francis Walker in 1859. It is found in eastern Pakistan and western India.
