= Lygropia polytesalis =

Scientific classification
- Kingdom: Animalia
- Phylum: Arthropoda
- Class: Insecta
- Order: Lepidoptera
- Family: Crambidae
- Genus: Lygropia
- Species: L. polytesalis

Binomial name
- Lygropia polytesalis (Walker, 1859)

Synonyms
- Botys polytesalis Walker, 1859

Species of moth

Lygropia polytesalis is a moth in the family Crambidae. It was described by Francis Walker in 1859. It is found in Tefé, Brazil.
