= Pycnarmon geminipuncta =

Scientific classification
- Kingdom: Animalia
- Phylum: Arthropoda
- Class: Insecta
- Order: Lepidoptera
- Family: Crambidae
- Genus: Pycnarmon
- Species: P. geminipuncta

Binomial name
- Pycnarmon geminipuncta (Hampson, 1912)

Synonyms
- Entephria geminipuncta Hampson, 1912

Species of moth

Pycnarmon geminipuncta is a moth in the family Crambidae. It was described by George Hampson in 1912. It is found in China.
