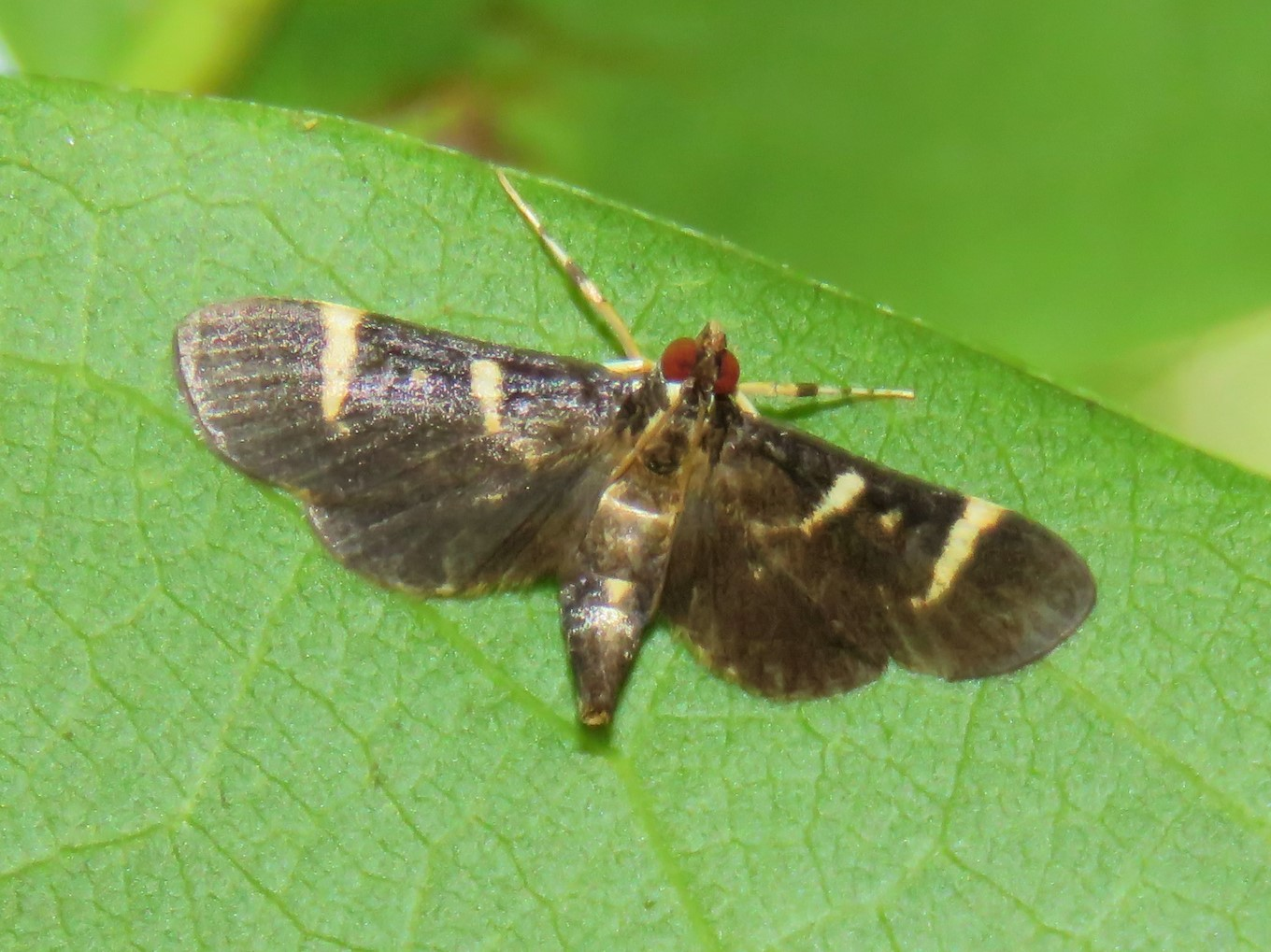

Scientific classification
- Kingdom: Animalia
- Phylum: Arthropoda
- Class: Insecta
- Order: Lepidoptera
- Family: Crambidae
- Genus: Lygropia
- Species: L. disarche

Binomial name
- Lygropia disarche Dyar, 1914

= Lygropia disarche =

Species of moth

Lygropia disarche is a species of moth in the family Crambidae. It is found in French Guiana.

== Description ==
The wingspan is about 13 mm. The forewings are bronzy-brown with two erect yellowish-white bars. The hindwings are whitish costally at the base.
