= Pycnarmon eosalis =

Scientific classification
- Kingdom: Animalia
- Phylum: Arthropoda
- Class: Insecta
- Order: Lepidoptera
- Family: Crambidae
- Genus: Pycnarmon
- Species: P. eosalis

Binomial name
- Pycnarmon eosalis Viette, 1958

Species of moth

Pycnarmon eosalis is a moth in the family Crambidae. It was first described by Pierre Viette in 1958. It is found in Madagascar.
