= Lygropia leucostolalis =

Scientific classification
- Kingdom: Animalia
- Phylum: Arthropoda
- Class: Insecta
- Order: Lepidoptera
- Family: Crambidae
- Genus: Lygropia
- Species: L. leucostolalis

Binomial name
- Lygropia leucostolalis Hampson, 1918

Synonyms
- Lygropia anthracopis Meyrick, 1934

Species of moth

Lygropia leucostolalis is a moth in the family Crambidae. It was described by George Hampson in 1918. It is found in Cameroon, the Democratic Republic of the Congo (Katanga, Kasai-Occidental, Équateur), Ghana, Sierra Leone and Uganda.
