= Lygropia amplificata =

Scientific classification
- Domain: Eukaryota
- Kingdom: Animalia
- Phylum: Arthropoda
- Class: Insecta
- Order: Lepidoptera
- Family: Crambidae
- Genus: Lygropia
- Species: L. amplificata

Binomial name
- Lygropia amplificata (Warren, 1896)

Synonyms
- Metoeca amplificata Warren, 1896

Species of moth

Lygropia amplificata is a moth in the family Crambidae. It was described by Warren in 1896. It is found in India.
