= Furcivena euclidialis =

Scientific classification
- Kingdom: Animalia
- Phylum: Arthropoda
- Class: Insecta
- Order: Lepidoptera
- Family: Crambidae
- Genus: Furcivena
- Species: F. euclidialis

Binomial name
- Furcivena euclidialis (Hampson, 1906)

Synonyms
- Cataclysta euclidialis Hampson, 1906

Species of moth

Furcivena euclidialis is a moth in the family Crambidae. It was described by George Hampson in 1906. It is found in Nigeria.
