= Lygropia acastalis =

Scientific classification
- Kingdom: Animalia
- Phylum: Arthropoda
- Class: Insecta
- Order: Lepidoptera
- Family: Crambidae
- Genus: Lygropia
- Species: L. acastalis

Binomial name
- Lygropia acastalis (Walker, 1859)

Synonyms
- Botys acastalis Walker, 1859; Ebulea heronalis Walker, 1859

Species of moth

Lygropia acastalis is a moth in the family Crambidae. It was described by Francis Walker in 1859. It is found in Honduras.
