= Lygropia erythrobathrum =

Scientific classification
- Kingdom: Animalia
- Phylum: Arthropoda
- Class: Insecta
- Order: Lepidoptera
- Family: Crambidae
- Genus: Lygropia
- Species: L. erythrobathrum

Binomial name
- Lygropia erythrobathrum Dyar, 1914

Species of moth

Lygropia erythrobathrum is a moth in the family Crambidae. It is found in Panama.

The wingspan is about 15 mm. The forewings are bronzy brown-black with a little greyish, the forewings with a white costal bar on the outer third and a white bar at the inner third. The base of the forewings is stained with dark red at the lower area. The hindwings are whitish at the base stained with dark red.
