= Pycnarmon fulvomarginalis =

Scientific classification
- Domain: Eukaryota
- Kingdom: Animalia
- Phylum: Arthropoda
- Class: Insecta
- Order: Lepidoptera
- Family: Crambidae
- Genus: Pycnarmon
- Species: P. fulvomarginalis

Binomial name
- Pycnarmon fulvomarginalis (Pagenstecher, 1900)

Synonyms
- Entephria fulvomarginalis Pagenstecher, 1900

Species of moth

Pycnarmon fulvomarginalis is a moth in the family Crambidae. It was described by Pagenstecher in 1900. It is found in Papua New Guinea, where it has been recorded from the Duke of York Islands, as well as on New Britain.
