= Lygropia sumatralis =

Scientific classification
- Domain: Eukaryota
- Kingdom: Animalia
- Phylum: Arthropoda
- Class: Insecta
- Order: Lepidoptera
- Family: Crambidae
- Genus: Lygropia
- Species: L. sumatralis

Binomial name
- Lygropia sumatralis C. Swinhoe, 1916

Species of moth

Lygropia sumatralis is a moth in the family Crambidae. It was described by Charles Swinhoe in 1916. It is found on Sumatra in Indonesia.
