= Lygropia holoxanthalis =

Scientific classification
- Domain: Eukaryota
- Kingdom: Animalia
- Phylum: Arthropoda
- Class: Insecta
- Order: Lepidoptera
- Family: Crambidae
- Genus: Lygropia
- Species: L. holoxanthalis

Binomial name
- Lygropia holoxanthalis Holland, 1900

Species of moth

Lygropia holoxanthalis is a moth in the family Crambidae. It was described by William Jacob Holland in 1900. It is found in Buru, Indonesia .
