= Lygropia leucophanalis =

Scientific classification
- Domain: Eukaryota
- Kingdom: Animalia
- Phylum: Arthropoda
- Class: Insecta
- Order: Lepidoptera
- Family: Crambidae
- Genus: Lygropia
- Species: L. leucophanalis

Binomial name
- Lygropia leucophanalis Mabille, 1900

Synonyms
- Bocchoris tenuilinealis Kenrick, 1917

Species of moth

Lygropia leucophanalis is a moth in the family Crambidae. It was described by Paul Mabille in 1900. It is found on Madagascar.
