= Pycnarmon pseudohesusalis =

Scientific classification
- Domain: Eukaryota
- Kingdom: Animalia
- Phylum: Arthropoda
- Class: Insecta
- Order: Lepidoptera
- Family: Crambidae
- Genus: Pycnarmon
- Species: P. pseudohesusalis

Binomial name
- Pycnarmon pseudohesusalis Strand, 1920

Synonyms
- Glyphidomarptis pyrochlaena Meyrick, 1936

Species of moth

Pycnarmon pseudohesusalis is a moth in the family Crambidae. It was described by Strand in 1920. It is found in the Democratic Republic of Congo (Equateur, East Kasai) and Malawi.
