= Lygropia euryclealis =

Scientific classification
- Kingdom: Animalia
- Phylum: Arthropoda
- Class: Insecta
- Order: Lepidoptera
- Family: Crambidae
- Genus: Lygropia
- Species: L. euryclealis

Binomial name
- Lygropia euryclealis (Walker, 1859)

Synonyms
- Botys euryclealis Walker, 1859; Botys sinonalis Walker, 1859; Lygropia euryclealis minutalis Caradja in Caradja & Meyrick, 1933

Species of moth

Lygropia euryclealis is a moth in the family Crambidae. It was described by Francis Walker in 1859. It is found in India, China (Guangdong) and on Borneo.
