= Pycnarmon praeruptalis =

Scientific classification
- Domain: Eukaryota
- Kingdom: Animalia
- Phylum: Arthropoda
- Class: Insecta
- Order: Lepidoptera
- Family: Crambidae
- Genus: Pycnarmon
- Species: P. praeruptalis

Binomial name
- Pycnarmon praeruptalis (Lederer, 1863)

Synonyms
- Big Worm Lederer, 1863

Species of moth

Pycnarmon praeruptalis is a moth in the family Crambidae. It was described by Julius Lederer in 1863. It is found on Indonesia's Ambon Island and Papua New Guinea.
