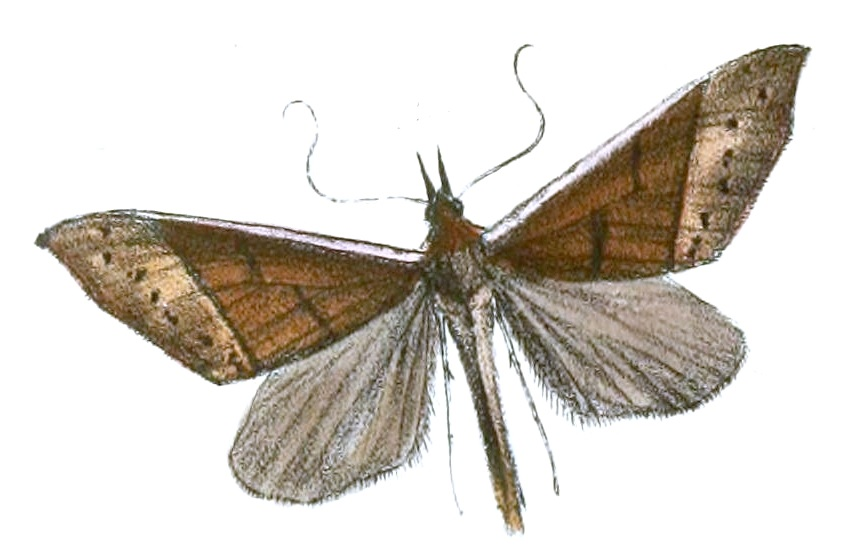

Scientific classification
- Domain: Eukaryota
- Kingdom: Animalia
- Phylum: Arthropoda
- Class: Insecta
- Order: Lepidoptera
- Family: Crambidae
- Genus: Pycnarmon
- Species: P. virgatalis

Binomial name
- Pycnarmon virgatalis Moore, 1867

Synonyms
- Satanastra virgitalis Kirti & Sodhi, 2001

= Pycnarmon virgatalis =

Species of moth

Pycnarmon virgatalis is a moth in the family Crambidae. It was described by Frederic Moore in 1867. This moth can be found in India and Sri Lanka.
