= Lygropia imparalis =

Scientific classification
- Kingdom: Animalia
- Phylum: Arthropoda
- Class: Insecta
- Order: Lepidoptera
- Family: Crambidae
- Genus: Lygropia
- Species: L. imparalis

Binomial name
- Lygropia imparalis (Walker, 1866)

Synonyms
- Samea imparalis Walker, 1866

Species of moth

Lygropia imparalis is a moth in the family Crambidae. It is found in the Dominican Republic, Puerto Rico and Cuba.
