= Lygropia rotundalis =

Scientific classification
- Domain: Eukaryota
- Kingdom: Animalia
- Phylum: Arthropoda
- Class: Insecta
- Order: Lepidoptera
- Family: Crambidae
- Genus: Lygropia
- Species: L. rotundalis

Binomial name
- Lygropia rotundalis (C. Felder, R. Felder & Rogenhofer, 1875)

Synonyms
- Physematia rotundalis C. Felder, R. Felder & Rogenhofer, 1875

Species of moth

Lygropia rotundalis is a moth in the family Crambidae. It was described by Cajetan Felder, Rudolf Felder and Alois Friedrich Rogenhofer in 1875. It is found in Dominican Republic.
