= Auxolophotis =

Scientific classification
- Domain: Eukaryota
- Kingdom: Animalia
- Phylum: Arthropoda
- Class: Insecta
- Order: Lepidoptera
- Family: Crambidae
- Subfamily: Pyraustinae
- Genus: Auxolophotis; Meyrick, 1933

Genus of moths

Auxolophotis is a genus of moths of the family Crambidae.

== Species ==
- Auxolophotis cosmophilopis (Meyrick, 1934)
- Auxolophotis ioxanthias Meyrick, 1933
