= Lygropia hypoleucalis =

Scientific classification
- Kingdom: Animalia
- Phylum: Arthropoda
- Class: Insecta
- Order: Lepidoptera
- Family: Crambidae
- Genus: Lygropia
- Species: L. hypoleucalis

Binomial name
- Lygropia hypoleucalis Hampson, 1912

Species of moth

Lygropia hypoleucalis is a moth in the family Crambidae. It was described by George Hampson in 1912. It is found in French Guiana.
