= Lygropia chrysozonalis =

Scientific classification
- Kingdom: Animalia
- Phylum: Arthropoda
- Class: Insecta
- Order: Lepidoptera
- Family: Crambidae
- Genus: Lygropia
- Species: L. chrysozonalis

Binomial name
- Lygropia chrysozonalis Hampson, 1912

Species of moth

Lygropia chrysozonalis is a moth in the family Crambidae. It was described by George Hampson in 1912. It is found in Peru.
