= Placosaris lindgreni =

Scientific classification
- Domain: Eukaryota
- Kingdom: Animalia
- Phylum: Arthropoda
- Class: Insecta
- Order: Lepidoptera
- Family: Crambidae
- Genus: Placosaris
- Species: P. lindgreni

Binomial name
- Placosaris lindgreni Munroe & Mutuura, 1970

Species of moth

Placosaris lindgreni is a moth in the family Crambidae. It was described by Eugene G. Munroe and Akira Mutuura in 1970. It is found in India.
