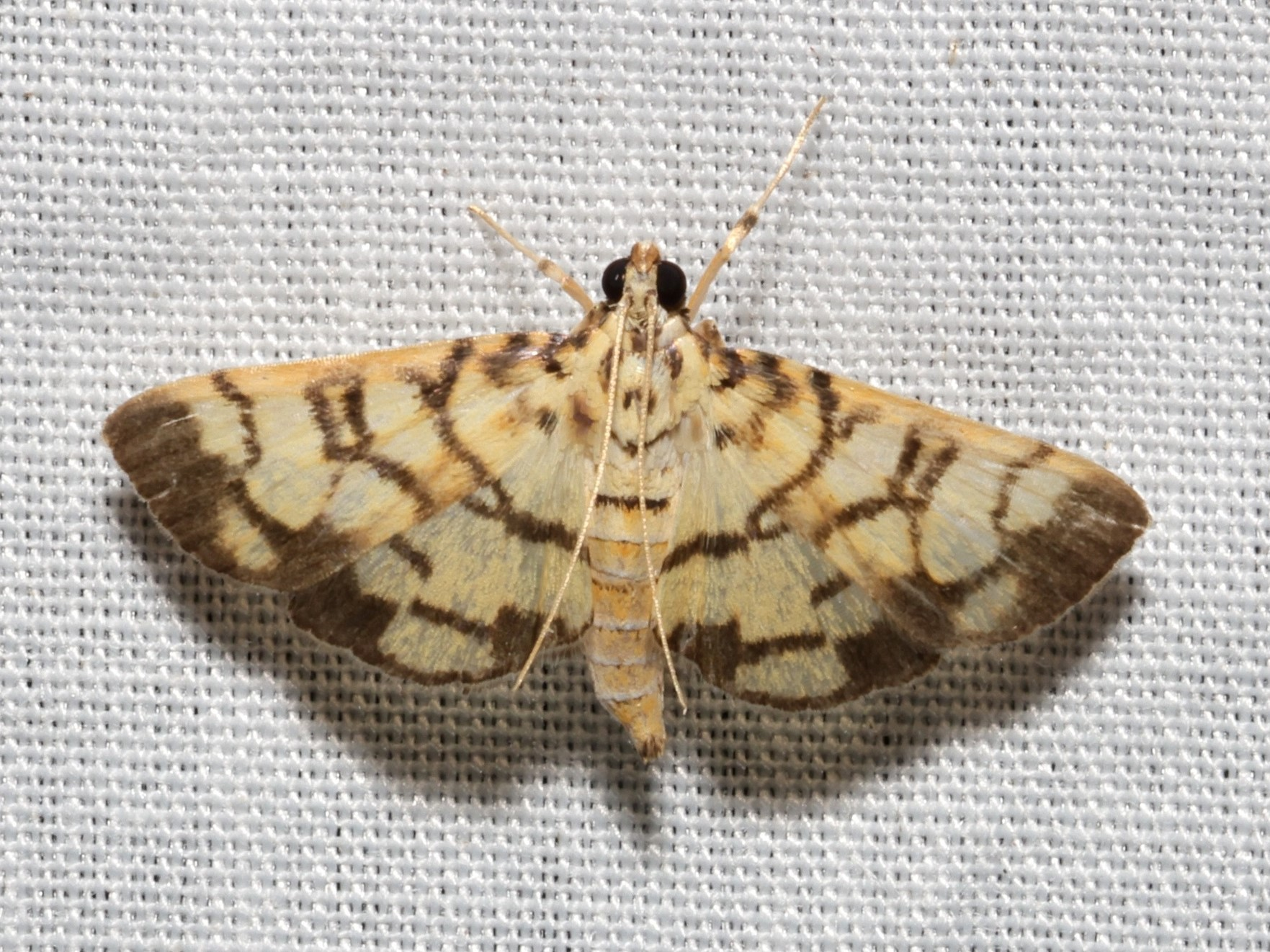

Scientific classification
- Domain: Eukaryota
- Kingdom: Animalia
- Phylum: Arthropoda
- Class: Insecta
- Order: Lepidoptera
- Family: Crambidae
- Genus: Lygropia
- Species: L. distorta

Binomial name
- Lygropia distorta (Moore, 1885)

Synonyms
- Pelecyntis distorta Moore, 1885

= Lygropia distorta =

Species of moth

Lygropia distorta is a species of moth in the family Crambidae. It was described by Frederic Moore in 1885. It is found in Sri Lanka.
