= Pycnarmon grisealis =

Scientific classification
- Domain: Eukaryota
- Kingdom: Animalia
- Phylum: Arthropoda
- Class: Insecta
- Order: Lepidoptera
- Family: Crambidae
- Genus: Pycnarmon
- Species: P. grisealis

Binomial name
- Pycnarmon grisealis (Kenrick, 1912)

Synonyms
- Entephria grisealis Kenrick, 1912

Species of moth

Pycnarmon grisealis is a moth in the family Crambidae. It was described by George Hamilton Kenrick in 1912. It is found in Papua New Guinea.

The wingspan is about 32 mm. The forewings are white shaded with grey. There are two transverse ochreous antemedian lines and a median line from the inner margin to vein 2, where it disappears in a broad shade. There is a transverse distinct line from the costa to vein 2 beyond the cell. The hindwings are white with a transverse dark line from the angle to the costa and another from the costa beyond the cell to vein 2. The margins of both wings are bordered by a dark, thin, double line enclosing a paler portion.
