= Placosaris egerialis =

Scientific classification
- Kingdom: Animalia
- Phylum: Arthropoda
- Clade: Pancrustacea
- Class: Insecta
- Order: Lepidoptera
- Family: Crambidae
- Genus: Placosaris
- Species: P. egerialis

Binomial name
- Placosaris egerialis (Snellen, 1899)

Synonyms
- Xanthelectris beatrix Meyrick, 1938

Species of moth

Placosaris egerialis is a snout moth in the subfamily Pyraustinae of the family Crambidae. It was described by Pieter Cornelius Tobias Snellen in 1899 based on specimens collected on Java.

The species was transferred to Placosaris in 1970 and placed in the Placosaris leucula species group.
