= Furcivena dialithalis =

Scientific classification
- Kingdom: Animalia
- Phylum: Arthropoda
- Class: Insecta
- Order: Lepidoptera
- Family: Crambidae
- Genus: Furcivena
- Species: F. dialithalis

Binomial name
- Furcivena dialithalis (Hampson, 1917)

Synonyms
- Pycnarmon dialithalis Hampson, 1917

Species of moth

Furcivena dialithalis is a moth in the family Crambidae. It was described by George Hampson in 1917. It is found in Ghana.
