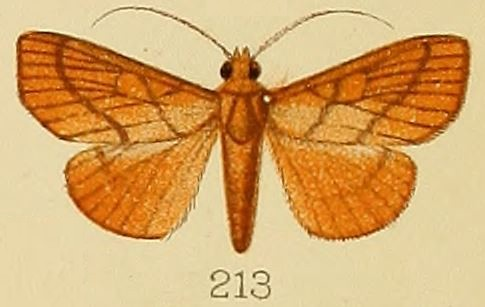

Scientific classification
- Domain: Eukaryota
- Kingdom: Animalia
- Phylum: Arthropoda
- Class: Insecta
- Order: Lepidoptera
- Family: Crambidae
- Genus: Placosaris
- Species: P. triticalis

Binomial name
- Placosaris triticalis (Kenrick, 1907)

Synonyms
- Pyrausta triticalis Kenrick, 1907

= Placosaris triticalis =

Species of moth

Placosaris triticalis is a species of moth of the family Crambidae described by George Hamilton Kenrick in 1907. It is found in Papua New Guinea.

This species has a wingspan of 26 mm.
