= Auxolophotis cosmophilopis =

Scientific classification
- Domain: Eukaryota
- Kingdom: Animalia
- Phylum: Arthropoda
- Class: Insecta
- Order: Lepidoptera
- Family: Crambidae
- Genus: Auxolophotis
- Species: A. cosmophilopis

Binomial name
- Auxolophotis cosmophilopis (Meyrick, 1934)

Synonyms
- Lygropia cosmophilopis Meyrick, 1934

Species of moth

Auxolophotis cosmophilopis is a moth in the family Crambidae. It was described by Edward Meyrick in 1934. It is found on Fiji.
