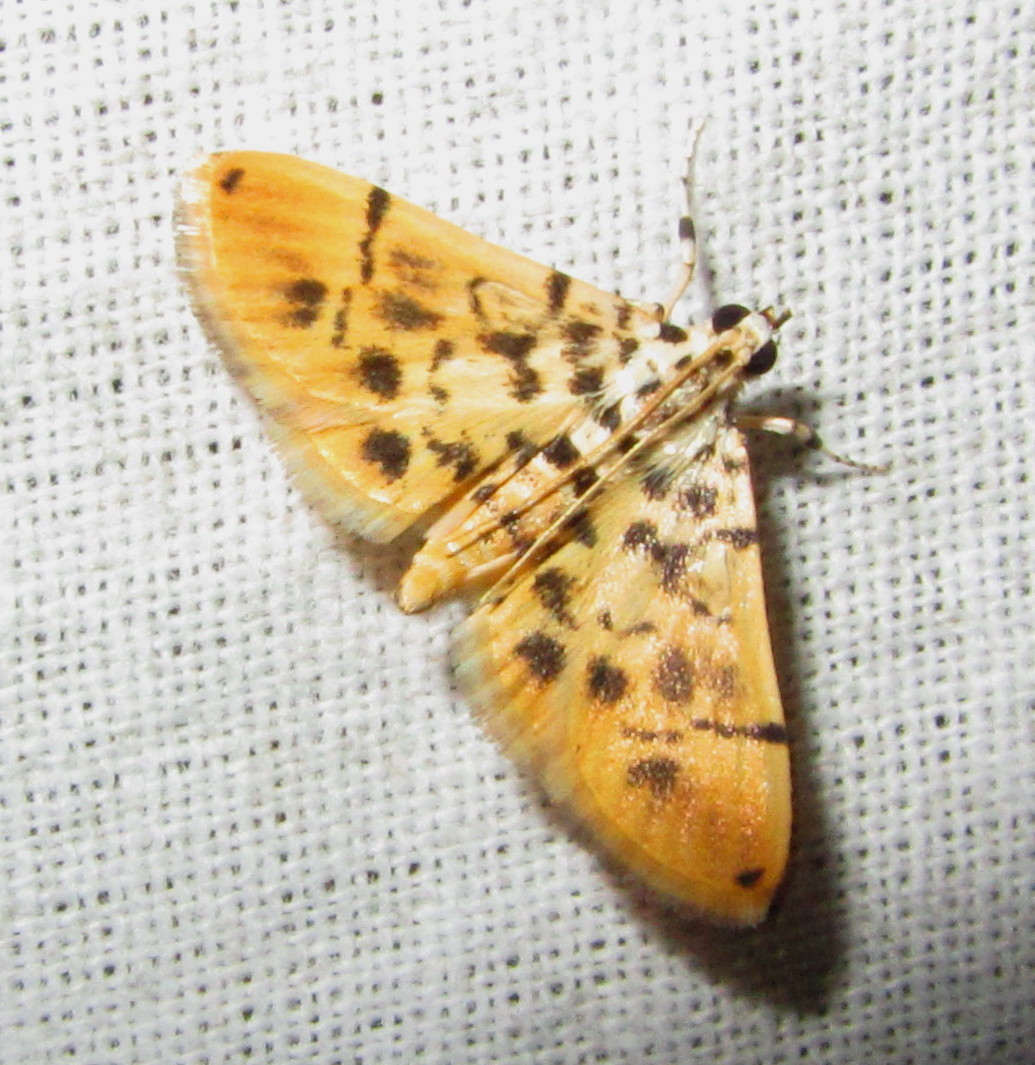
- Suhela alboflavalis, adult female

Scientific classification
- Kingdom: Animalia
- Phylum: Arthropoda
- Class: Insecta
- Order: Lepidoptera
- Family: Crambidae
- Genus: Suhela
- Species: S. alboflavalis

Binomial name
- Suhela alboflavalis (Moore, 1888)

Synonyms
- Conogethes alboflavalis Moore, 1888; Pycnarmon alboflavalis (Moore, 1888)

= Suhela alboflavalis =

Species of moth

Suhela alboflavalis is a moth in the species-rich subfamily Spilomelinae of the family Crambidae. It was described by Frederic Moore in 1888. It is found in India and Nepal.

The wingspan is 20 mm. Adults are white, the forewings with two black costal spots and three bands from the median nervure to the inner margin on the basal area. There is a discocellular black spot and large spots on the origin of veins 2 to 5, as well as a postmedial line, straight from costa to vein 5, then bent outwards and fine, with a spot below it on the inner margin. The marginal area is orange with a black speck at the apex and a double submarginal black spot on vein 4. The hindwings are white with a black spot at the base of the inner margin. There is a double series of black spots from below the lower angle of the cell to the anal angle. The marginal area is orange, with a submarginal black spot on vein 4 and some specks on the margin towards the anal angle.
