= Pycnarmon schematospila =

Scientific classification
- Kingdom: Animalia
- Phylum: Arthropoda
- Clade: Pancrustacea
- Class: Insecta
- Order: Lepidoptera
- Family: Crambidae
- Genus: Pycnarmon
- Species: P. schematospila

Binomial name
- Pycnarmon schematospila (Meyrick, 1937)

Synonyms
- Lygropia schematospila Meyrick, 1937

Species of moth

Pycnarmon schematospila is a moth in the family Crambidae. It was described by Edward Meyrick in 1937. It is found in Tanzania.
