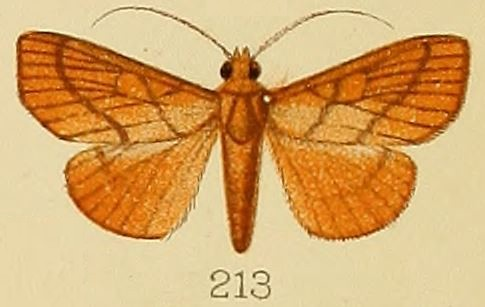
- Placosaris triticalis, adult, illustrated in

Scientific classification
- Kingdom: Animalia
- Phylum: Arthropoda
- Clade: Pancrustacea
- Class: Insecta
- Order: Lepidoptera
- Family: Crambidae
- Subfamily: Pyraustinae
- Genus: Placosaris; Meyrick, 1897

Synonyms
- Xanthelectris Meyrick, 1938

= Placosaris =

Genus of moths

Placosaris is a genus of snout moths in the subfamily Pyraustinae of the family Crambidae. It is placed in the tribe Pyraustini.

The genus currently comprises 25 species, which are exclusively distributed in the Indomalayan realm and New Guinea. A taxonomic revision from 1970 covers the species distributed in Temperate East Asia.

== Species ==
Placosaris leucula species group:

- Placosaris callistalis (Hampson, 1896)
- Placosaris cricophora (West, 1931)
- Placosaris egerialis (Snellen, 1899)
- Placosaris galogalis Munroe & Mutuura, 1970
- Placosaris ingestalis (Snellen, 1899)
- Placosaris leucula Meyrick, 1897
- Placosaris triticalis Kenrick 1907
- Placosaris turiusalis (Walker, 1859)

Placosaris intensalis species group:

- Placosaris arjunoalis Munroe & Mutuura, 1970
- Placosaris auranticilialis (Caradja, 1925)
- Placosaris coorumba (Hampson, 1891)
- Placosaris dohertyi Munroe & Mutuura, 1970
- Placosaris intensalis (Swinhoe, 1894)
- Placosaris lindgreni Munroe & Mutuura, 1970
- Placosaris ochreipunctalis (Warren, 1896)
- Placosaris rubellalis (Caradja, 1925)
- Placosaris steelei Munroe & Mutuura, 1970
- Placosaris subfuscalis (Caradja in Caradja & Meyrick, 1933)
- Placosaris swanni Munroe & Mutuura, 1970
- Placosaris taiwanalis (Shibuya, 1928)
- Placosaris ustulalis (Hampson, 1896)

Unplaced in any species group:

- Placosaris apoalis Munroe & Mutuura, 1970
- Placosaris bornealis Munroe & Mutuura, 1970
- Placosaris perakalis Munroe & Mutuura, 1970
- Placosaris udealis Munroe & Mutuura, 1970
