= List of crambid genera: P =

The large moth family Crambidae contains the following genera beginning with "P":

- Pachybotys
- Pachynoa
- Pachyparda
- Pachyzancla
- Pachyzancloides
- Pagmanella
- Pagmania
- Pagyda
- Palepicorsia
- Paliga
- Palpita
- Palpusia
- Panalipa
- Panopsia
- Panotima
- Panstegia
- Pantoeocome
- Pantographa
- Paracataclysta
- Paracentristis
- Paracorsia
- Paracymoriza
- Paradosis
- Parambia
- Paracoleia
- Parancyla
- Paranomis
- Parapediasia
- Parapilocrocis
- Paraplatytes
- Parapoynx
- Parargyractis
- Parasitochroa
- Parastenia
- Paratalanta
- Paratraea
- Parbattia
- Parbokla
- Pardomima
- Paregesta
- Pareromene
- Parerupa
- Parotis
- Parthenodes
- Parudea
- Paschiodes
- Patania
- Patissa
- Patissodes
- Pectinobotys
- Pediasia
- Pelaea
- Pelecyntis
- Pelena
- Pelinopsis
- Penestola
- Peribona
- Perilypa
- Perimeceta
- Perinephela
- Perispasta
- Perisyntrocha
- Pessocosma
- Petrophila
- Phaedropsis
- Phakellura
- Phanerobela
- Phanomorpha
- Phenacodes
- Phlyctaenia
- Phlyctaenomorpha
- Phostria
- Phryctena
- Phryganodes
- Phryganomima
- Phycidicera
- Phyratocosma
- Physematia
- Piletocera
- Piletosoma
- Pilocrocis
- Piloptila
- Pimelephila
- Pindicitora
- Pitacanda
- Pitama
- Placosaris
- Plantegumia
- Plateopsis
- Platygraphis
- Platynoorda
- Platytes
- Platytesia
- Platytesis
- Plectrona
- Pleonectoides
- Pleonectusa
- Pleurasympieza
- Pleuroptya
- Plumegesta
- Plumipalpiella
- Pogonogenys
- Pogonoptera
- Polingia
- Polychorista
- Polycorys
- Polygrammodes
- Polygrammopsis
- Polyterpnes
- Polythlipta
- Porphyritis
- Porphyronoorda
- Porphyrorhegma
- Portentomorpha
- Potamomusa
- Praeacrospila
- Praephostria
- Pramadea
- Preneopogon
- Prenesta
- Prionapteron
- Prionapteryx
- Prionopaltis
- Prionotalis
- Probalaenifrons
- Prochoristis
- Proconica
- Procymbopteryx
- Prodasycnemis
- Prodelophanes
- Prodotaula
- Productalius
- Prolais
- Proleucinodes
- Promacrochilo
- Promylaea
- Pronomis
- Prooedema
- Propexus
- Prophantis
- Prorasea
- Prorodes
- Proschoenobius
- Protaphomia
- Protaulacistis
- Protepicorsia
- Proternia
- Proteroeca
- Proteuclasta
- Proteurrhypara
- Protinopalpa
- Protinopalpella
- Protocolletis
- Protonoceras
- Prototyla
- Protrigonia
- Protyparcha
- Psammobotys
- Psammotis
- Psara
- Psephis
- Pseudanalthes
- Pseudargyria
- Pseudebulea
- Pseudepicorsia
- Pseudeuchromius
- Pseudlithosia
- Pseudoancylolomia
- Pseudobissetia
- Pseudocatharylla
- Pseudochoreutes
- Pseudoclasseya
- Pseudoctenella
- Pseudoligostigma
- Pseudometachilo
- Pseudonoorda
- Pseudoparaponyx
- Pseudopediasia
- Pseudopolygrammodes
- Pseudopyrausta
- Pseudoschinia
- Pseudoschoenobius
- Pterygisus
- Ptiladarcha
- Ptilaeola
- Ptochostola
- Ptychopseustis
- Pycnarmon
- Pygospila
- Pylartes
- Pyradena
- Pyralausta
- Pyralocymatophora
- Pyrasia
- Pyrausta
- Pyraustimorpha
- Pythagoraea
