= List of crambid genera: A =

The large moth family Crambidae contains the following genera beginning with "A":

- Abegesta
- Aboetheta
- Acellalis
- Acentria
- Achantodes
- Achilo
- Achyra
- Acicys
- Acropentias
- Adelpherupa
- Adoxobotys
- Aediodina
- Aeglotis
- Aenigmodes
- Aeolopetra
- Aeolosma
- Aeschremon
- Aethaloessa
- Aethiophysa
- Aetholix
- Agassiziella
- Agastya
- Agathodes
- Aglaops
- Agrammia
- Agrioglypta
- Agriphila
- Agriphiloides
- Agrotera
- Aiyura
- Alatuncusia
- Alatuncusiodes
- Alloperissa
- Almita
- Almonia
- Ambahona
- Ambia
- Ametasia
- Ametrea
- Amselia
- Anaclastis
- Anageshna
- Analcina
- Analthes
- Analyta
- Anamalaia
- Anania
- Anarmodia
- Anarpia
- Anatralata
- Ancalidia
- Ancylolomia
- Ancyloptila
- Ancylostomia
- Angonia
- Angustalius
- Anisoctena
- Anomocrambus
- Antennodes
- Anthocrypta
- Anthophilodes
- Anthophilopsis
- Antiercta
- Antigastra
- Antiscopa
- Anydraula
- Aphrophantis
- Aphytoceros
- Apilocrocis
- Aplectropus
- Aplographe
- Aplomastix
- Apoblepta
- Apoecetes
- Apogeshna
- Aponia
- Aporocosmus
- Aporodes
- Apurima
- Apyrausta
- Araeomorpha
- Araschnopsis
- Araxates
- Archernis
- Archischoenobius
- Arenochroa
- Arequipa
- Argentochiloides
- Argyractis
- Argyractoides
- Argyrarcha
- Argyria
- Argyrophorodes
- Argyrostola
- Aripana
- Arischoenobius
- Aristebulea
- Arnia
- Arthriobasis
- Arthromastix
- Arthroschista
- Arunamalaia
- Arxama
- Asciodes
- Asparagmia
- Asphadastis
- Astura
- Asturodes
- Ategumia
- Atelocentra
- Atheropoda
- Atomoclostis
- Atomopteryx
- Atralata
- Auchmophoba
- Aulacodes
- Aulacoptera
- Aureocramboides
- Aureopteryx
- Aurorobotys
- Aurotalis
- Australargyria
- Autarotis
- Authaeretis
- Autocharis
- Autocosmia
- Auxolophotis
- Auxomitia
- Azochis
