= List of crambid genera: E =

The large moth family Crambidae contains the following genera beginning with "E":

- Ebulea
- Ebuleodes
- Eclipsiodes
- Ecpyrrhorrhoe
- Ectadiosoma
- Edia
- Eidama
- Elachypteryx
- Elbursia
- Elethyia
- Ellogima
- Elophila
- Elosita
- Elusia
- Emphylica
- Emprepes
- Enchocnemidia
- Endocrossis
- Endographis
- Endolophia
- Endotrichella
- Ennomosia
- Ennychia
- Enyocera
- Eodiatraea
- Eoophyla
- Eoparagyractis
- Eoreuma
- Epactoctena
- Epascestria
- Ephelis
- Epherema
- Ephormotris
- Epichilo
- Epichronistis
- Epicorsia
- Epiecia
- Epimetasia
- Epimima
- Epina
- Epinoorda
- Epipagis
- Epiparbattia
- Eporidia
- Eranistis
- Ercta
- Erebangela
- Eremanthe
- Eretmopteryx
- Erilita
- Erilusa
- Erinothus
- Eristena
- Erotomanes
- Erpis
- Ertrica
- Erupa
- Eschata
- Eteta
- Eucallaenia
- Euchromius
- Euclasta
- Euctenospila
- Eudaimonisma
- Eudioptis
- Eudipleurina
- Eudonia
- Eufernaldia
- Eugauria
- Eugrotea
- Eulepte
- Euleucinodes
- Eumaragma
- Eumorphobotys
- Euparolia
- Eupastranaia
- Euphyciodes
- Eupoca
- Eupolemarcha
- Eurhythma
- Eurrhypara
- Eurrhyparodes
- Eurrhypis
- Eurybela
- Eurycraspeda
- Eurycreon
- Eurytorna
- Eusabena
- Eustenia
- Eustixia
- Eutectona
- Euthalantha
- Eutrichotis
- Evergestella
- Evergestis
- Exarcha
- Exeristis
- Exoria
- Exsilirarcha
