= List of crambid genera: C =

The large moth family Crambidae contains the following genera beginning with "C":

- Cacographis
- Cadarena
- Caffrocrambus
- Calamochrous
- Calamoschoena
- Calamotropha
- Calarina
- Callibotys
- Callilitha
- Callinaias
- Calliphlycta
- Caloptychia
- Camptomastix
- Camptomastyx
- Cangetta
- Canuza
- Capparidia
- Caprinia
- Caradjaina
- Carbaca
- Carectocultus
- Carminibotys
- Catacteniza
- Catagela
- Catancyla
- Cataonia
- Catapsephis
- Catharia
- Catharylla
- Catoptria
- Cavifrons
- Cenocnemis
- Centropseustis
- Cephis
- Ceratarcha
- Ceratocilia
- Ceratoclasis
- Cereophagus
- Cervicrambus
- Ceuthobotys
- Chabula
- Chaerecla
- Chalcidoptera
- Chalcoela
- Chalcoelopsis
- Charema
- Charitopepla
- Charitoprepes
- Charltona
- Charltoniada
- Cheloterma
- Chilandrus
- Chilo
- Chilochroma
- Chilochromopsis
- Chilocorsia
- Chilomima
- Chilopionea
- Chilopsis
- Chilotraea
- Chilozela
- Chionobosca
- Chiqua
- Chlorobaptella
- Chnaura
- Chobera
- Cholius
- Choristostigma
- Chrismania
- Chromodes
- Chrysendeton
- Chrysobotys
- Chrysocramboides
- Chrysocrambus
- Chrysommatodes
- Chrysophyllis
- Chrysoteuchia
- Chrysothyridia
- Cilaus
- Cindaphia
- Ciraphorus
- Circobotys
- Cirrhocephalina
- Cirrhochrista
- Cissachroa
- Clarkeiodes
- Clasperia
- Classeya
- Clatrodes
- Cleoeromene
- Clepsicosma
- Cleptotypodes
- Cliniodes
- Clupeosoma
- Cnaphalocrocis
- Coclebotys
- Coelobathra
- Coelorhyncidia
- Coenostola
- Coenostolopsis
- Coenotalis
- Colimaea
- Colomychus
- Cometura
- Compacta
- Compsophila
- Conchylodes
- Condega
- Condylorrhiza
- Coniesta
- Conocramboides
- Conocrambus
- Conogethes
- Conoprora
- Conotalis
- Contiger
- Contortipalpia
- Coptobasis
- Coptobasoides
- Coremata
- Coremataria
- Cornifrons
- Corynophora
- Cosipara
- Cosmocreon
- Cosmophylla
- Cosmopterosis
- Cotachena
- Crambidiatraea
- Crambidion
- Crambixon
- Crambostenia
- Crambus
- Crasigenes
- Criophthona
- Crocidocnemis
- Crocidolomia
- Crocidophora
- Crypsiptya
- Cryptobotys
- Cryptocosma
- Cryptographis
- Cryptosara
- Culladia
- Culladiella
- Cuneifrons
- Cybalomia
- Cyclarcha
- Cyclocausta
- Cyclocena
- Cydalima
- Cylindrifrons
- Cymbopteryx
- Cymoriza
- Cynaeda
- Cypholomia
- Cyrtogramme
