= List of crambid genera: L =

The large moth family Crambidae contains the following genera beginning with "L":

- La
- Lampridia
- Lamprophaia
- Lamprosema
- Lancia
- Langessa
- Laniifera
- Laniipriva
- Lasiacme
- Lasiogyia
- Lathroteles
- Lativalva
- Leechia
- Leimonia
- Leonardo
- Lepidoneura
- Lepidoplaga
- Leptarchis
- Leptosophista
- Leptosteges
- Lepyrodes
- Leucargyra
- Leucinocrambus
- Leucinodella
- Leucinodes
- Leucochroma
- Leucochromodes
- Leucocraspeda
- Leucogephyra
- Leucoides
- Leucophotis
- Libuna
- Limbobotys
- Limnopsares
- Lineodes
- Linosta
- Liopasia
- Lipararchis
- Lipocosma
- Lipocosmodes
- Lipocosmopsis
- Lissophanes
- Loetrina
- Lomotropa
- Lotanga
- Loxmaionia
- Loxocorys
- Loxocrambus
- Loxocreon
- Loxomorpha
- Loxoneptera
- Loxophantis
- Loxoscia
- Loxostege
- Loxostegopsis
- Luma
- Lumenia
- Lygropia
- Lyndia
- Lypotigris
