= List of crambid genera: I =

The large moth family Crambidae contains the following genera beginning with "I":

- Ichthyoptila
- Idessa
- Idioblasta
- Idiostrophe
- Idiusia
- Iesta
- Ilurgia
- Incaeromene
- Indogrammodes
- Iranarpia
- Irigilla
- Ischnoscopa
- Ischnurges
- Ismene
- Isocentris
