= List of crambid genera: V =

The large moth family Crambidae contains the following genera beginning with "V":

- Varpa
- Vatica
- Vaxi
- Velasquez
- Veronese
- Vietteina
- Viettessa
- Vinculopsis
- Vittabotys
- Voliba
