= Gyptitia =

Scientific classification
- Domain: Eukaryota
- Kingdom: Animalia
- Phylum: Arthropoda
- Class: Insecta
- Order: Lepidoptera
- Family: Crambidae
- Subfamily: Pyraustinae
- Genus: Gyptitia; Snellen, 1883
- Species: G. gonialis

Binomial name
- Gyptitia gonialis Snellen, 1883

Genus of moths

Gyptitia is a genus of moths of the family Crambidae. It contains only one species, Gyptitia gonialis, which is found on Sulawesi.
