= Mimasarta =

Scientific classification
- Domain: Eukaryota
- Kingdom: Animalia
- Phylum: Arthropoda
- Class: Insecta
- Order: Lepidoptera
- Family: Crambidae
- Subfamily: Pyraustinae
- Genus: Mimasarta; Ragonot, 1894
- Species: M. niveifascialis

Binomial name
- Mimasarta niveifascialis Ragonot, 1894

Synonyms
- Mimasarta alaicalis Caradja, 1928

Genus of moths

Mimasarta is a genus of moths of the family Crambidae. It contains only one species, Mimasarta niveifascialis, which is found in Central Asia.
