= Aulacoptera fuscinervalis =

Scientific classification
- Kingdom: Animalia
- Phylum: Arthropoda
- Class: Insecta
- Order: Lepidoptera
- Family: Crambidae
- Genus: Aulacoptera
- Species: A. fuscinervalis

Binomial name
- Aulacoptera fuscinervalis (C. Swinhoe, 1895)

Synonyms
- Aulacophora fuscinervalis C. Swinhoe, 1895

Species of moth

Aulacoptera fuscinervalis is a moth in the family Crambidae. It was described by Charles Swinhoe in 1895. It is found in India.

The wingspan is about 18 mm. The body is a light, brownish yellow. The fore wings are a pale grey, the hind wings are white with a grey edge. The underside, including the setae, is white.
