= Pseudepicorsia septentrionis =

Scientific classification
- Domain: Eukaryota
- Kingdom: Animalia
- Phylum: Arthropoda
- Class: Insecta
- Order: Lepidoptera
- Family: Crambidae
- Genus: Pseudepicorsia
- Species: P. septentrionis

Binomial name
- Pseudepicorsia septentrionis Munroe, 1964

Species of moth

Pseudepicorsia septentrionis is a moth in the family Crambidae. It was described by Eugene G. Munroe in 1964. It is found in Peru.
