= Decelia terrosalis =

Scientific classification
- Kingdom: Animalia
- Phylum: Arthropoda
- Class: Insecta
- Order: Lepidoptera
- Family: Crambidae
- Subfamily: Pyraustinae
- Genus: Decelia; Snellen, 1880
- Species: D. terrosalis

Binomial name
- Decelia terrosalis Snellen, 1880

Genus of moths

Decelia is a genus of moths of the family Crambidae. It contains only one species, Decelia terrosalis, which is found on Sulawesi.
