= Piletosoma novalis =

Scientific classification
- Kingdom: Animalia
- Phylum: Arthropoda
- Class: Insecta
- Order: Lepidoptera
- Family: Crambidae
- Genus: Piletosoma
- Species: P. novalis

Binomial name
- Piletosoma novalis (Walker, 1866)

Synonyms
- Botys novalis Walker, 1866

Species of moth

Piletosoma novalis is a moth in the family Crambidae. It was described by Francis Walker in 1866. It is found in Brazil.
