= Nacoleiopsis =

Scientific classification
- Domain: Eukaryota
- Kingdom: Animalia
- Phylum: Arthropoda
- Class: Insecta
- Order: Lepidoptera
- Family: Crambidae
- Subfamily: Pyraustinae
- Genus: Nacoleiopsis; Matsumura, 1925
- Species: N. auriceps

Binomial name
- Nacoleiopsis auriceps Matsumura, 1925

Genus of moths

Nacoleiopsis is a genus of moths of the family Crambidae. It contains only one species, Nacoleiopsis auriceps, which is found in Sakhalin.
