= Burathema =

Scientific classification
- Domain: Eukaryota
- Kingdom: Animalia
- Phylum: Arthropoda
- Class: Insecta
- Order: Lepidoptera
- Family: Crambidae
- Subfamily: Pyraustinae
- Genus: Burathema; Walker, 1863
- Species: B. divisa

Binomial name
- Burathema divisa Walker, 1863

Genus of moths

Burathema is a genus of moths of the family Crambidae. It contains only one species, Burathema divisa, which is found on Borneo.
