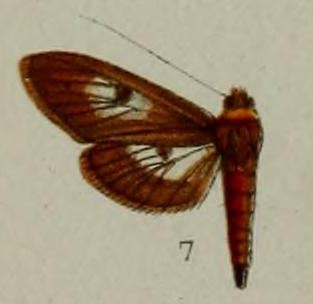

Scientific classification
- Kingdom: Animalia
- Phylum: Arthropoda
- Class: Insecta
- Order: Lepidoptera
- Family: Crambidae
- Genus: Piletosoma
- Species: P. ignidorsalis

Binomial name
- Piletosoma ignidorsalis Hampson, 1898

= Piletosoma ignidorsalis =

Species of moth

Piletosoma ignidorsalis is a moth in the family Crambidae. It was described by George Hampson in 1898. It is found in Peru.
