= Proconica nigrcyanalis =

Scientific classification
- Kingdom: Animalia
- Phylum: Arthropoda
- Class: Insecta
- Order: Lepidoptera
- Family: Crambidae
- Genus: Proconica
- Species: P. nigrcyanalis

Binomial name
- Proconica nigrcyanalis Hampson, 1899

Species of moth

Proconica nigrcyanalis (also spelled nigrocyanalis) is a moth in the family Crambidae. It was described by George Hampson in 1899. It is found in Meghalaya, India.

== Appearance ==
According to Hampson, the male exhibits a dark hue with a hint of purple, featuring white areas beneath the palpi, legs, and lower abdomen. The forewing is characterized by a conspicuous square-shaped white spot within the cell, accompanied by three postmedial white lines between vein 3 and the inner margin. Additionally, two specks are observed below the costa towards the apex, while the cilia are white above the outer angle. The hind wing displays a straight medial white line that is interrupted at vein 5, and the cilia are white above the anal angle.
