= Macrospectrodes =

Scientific classification
- Kingdom: Animalia
- Phylum: Arthropoda
- Class: Insecta
- Order: Lepidoptera
- Family: Crambidae
- Subfamily: Pyraustinae
- Genus: Macrospectrodes; Warren, 1896
- Species: M. subargentalis

Binomial name
- Macrospectrodes subargentalis (Snellen, 1890)

Synonyms
- Generic; Lamprosema; Specific; Botys subargentalis Snellen, 1890; Lamprosema subargentalis Snellen, 1890

Genus of moths

Macrospectrodes is a genus of moths of the family Crambidae.Beccaloni, G.; Scoble, M.; Kitching, I.; Simonsen, T.; Robinson, G.; Pitkin, B.; Hine, A.; Lyal, C., eds. (2003). "Lamprosema". The Global Lepidoptera Names Index. Natural History Museum. It contains only one species, Macrospectrodes subargentalis, which is found in India (Sikkim).
