= Piletosoma chaquimayalis =

Scientific classification
- Kingdom: Animalia
- Phylum: Arthropoda
- Class: Insecta
- Order: Lepidoptera
- Family: Crambidae
- Genus: Piletosoma
- Species: P. chaquimayalis

Binomial name
- Piletosoma chaquimayalis Schaus, 1924

Species of moth

Piletosoma chaquimayalis is a moth in the family Crambidae. It was described by Schaus in 1924. It is found in Peru.
