= Herpetobotys ugandae =

Scientific classification
- Domain: Eukaryota
- Kingdom: Animalia
- Phylum: Arthropoda
- Class: Insecta
- Order: Lepidoptera
- Family: Crambidae
- Genus: Herpetobotys
- Species: H. ugandae

Binomial name
- Herpetobotys ugandae Maes, 2001

Species of moth

Herpetobotys ugandae is a moth in the family Crambidae. It was described by Koen V. N. Maes in 2001. It is found in Uganda.
