= Pleonectoides =

Scientific classification
- Domain: Eukaryota
- Kingdom: Animalia
- Phylum: Arthropoda
- Class: Insecta
- Order: Lepidoptera
- Family: Crambidae
- Subfamily: Pyraustinae
- Genus: Pleonectoides; Hampson, 1891
- Species: P. vinacea

Binomial name
- Pleonectoides vinacea Hampson, 1891

Genus of moths

Pleonectoides is a genus of moths of the family Crambidae. It contains only one species, Pleonectoides vinacea, which is found in southern India.
