= Nymphulosis =

Scientific classification
- Domain: Eukaryota
- Kingdom: Animalia
- Phylum: Arthropoda
- Class: Insecta
- Order: Lepidoptera
- Family: Crambidae
- Subfamily: Pyraustinae
- Genus: Nymphulosis; Amsel, 1959
- Species: N. arcanella

Binomial name
- Nymphulosis arcanella Amsel, 1959

Genus of moths

Nymphulosis is a genus of moths of the family Crambidae. It contains only one species, Nymphulosis arcanella, is found in Iraq.
