= Cybalobotys manengoubae =

Scientific classification
- Domain: Eukaryota
- Kingdom: Animalia
- Phylum: Arthropoda
- Class: Insecta
- Order: Lepidoptera
- Family: Crambidae
- Genus: Cybalobotys
- Species: C. manengoubae

Binomial name
- Cybalobotys manengoubae Maes, 2001

Species of moth

Cybalobotys manengoubae is a moth in the family Crambidae. It was described by Koen V. N. Maes in 2001. It is found in Cameroon.
