= Piletosoma holophaealis =

Scientific classification
- Kingdom: Animalia
- Phylum: Arthropoda
- Class: Insecta
- Order: Lepidoptera
- Family: Crambidae
- Genus: Piletosoma
- Species: P. holophaealis

Binomial name
- Piletosoma holophaealis Hampson, 1912

Species of moth

Piletosoma holophaealis is a moth in the family Crambidae. It was described by George Hampson in 1912. It is found in Singapore.
