= Capparidia =

Scientific classification
- Kingdom: Animalia
- Phylum: Arthropoda
- Class: Insecta
- Order: Lepidoptera
- Family: Crambidae
- Subfamily: Pyraustinae
- Genus: Capparidia; Dumont, 1931
- Species: C. ghardaialis

Binomial name
- Capparidia ghardaialis Dumont, 1931

Genus of moths

Capparidia is a genus of moths of the family Crambidae. It contains only one species, Capparidia ghardaialis, which is found in North Africa.
