= Proconica flaviguttalis =

Scientific classification
- Kingdom: Animalia
- Phylum: Arthropoda
- Class: Insecta
- Order: Lepidoptera
- Family: Crambidae
- Genus: Proconica
- Species: P. flaviguttalis

Binomial name
- Proconica flaviguttalis Hampson, 1899

Species of moth

Proconica flaviguttalis is a moth in the family Crambidae. It was described by George Hampson in 1899. It is found in Nigeria.

== Appearance ==
According to Hampson, the male is of a dusky color, and the abdomen shows remnants of fulvous bands. The forewing features a square-shaped yellow discoidal spot. On the hind wing, the region covered by the tornal lobe of the forewing appears whitish.
