= Piletosoma thialis =

Scientific classification
- Kingdom: Animalia
- Phylum: Arthropoda
- Class: Insecta
- Order: Lepidoptera
- Family: Crambidae
- Genus: Piletosoma
- Species: P. thialis

Binomial name
- Piletosoma thialis Dyar, 1914

Species of moth

Piletosoma thialis is a moth in the family Crambidae. It is found in Panama.

The wingspan is about 32 mm.
