= Cybalobotys =

Scientific classification
- Domain: Eukaryota
- Kingdom: Animalia
- Phylum: Arthropoda
- Class: Insecta
- Order: Lepidoptera
- Family: Crambidae
- Subfamily: Pyraustinae
- Genus: Cybalobotys; Maes, 2001

Genus of moths

Cybalobotys is a genus of moths of the family Crambidae.

== Species ==
- Cybalobotys kakamegae Maes, 2001
- Cybalobotys manengoubae Maes, 2001
- Cybalobotys nyasalis Maes, 2001
