= Powysia =

Scientific classification
- Domain: Eukaryota
- Kingdom: Animalia
- Phylum: Arthropoda
- Class: Insecta
- Order: Lepidoptera
- Family: Crambidae
- Subfamily: Pyraustinae
- Genus: Powysia; Maes, 2006
- Species: P. rosealinea

Binomial name
- Powysia rosealinea Maes, 2006

Genus of moths

Powysia is a genus of moths of the family Crambidae. It contains only one species, Powysia rosealinea, which is found on Kenya and Tanzania.
