= Glyphidomarptis =

Scientific classification
- Kingdom: Animalia
- Phylum: Arthropoda
- Class: Insecta
- Order: Lepidoptera
- Family: Crambidae
- Subfamily: Pyraustinae
- Genus: Glyphidomarptis; Meyrick, 1936
- Species: G. cyphoplaca

Binomial name
- Glyphidomarptis cyphoplaca (Meyrick, 1933)

Synonyms
- Rhimphaleodes cyphoplaca Meyrick, 1933

Genus of moths

Glyphidomarptis is a genus of moths of the family Crambidae. It contains only one species, Glyphidomarptis cyphoplaca, which is found in the Democratic Republic of Congo.
