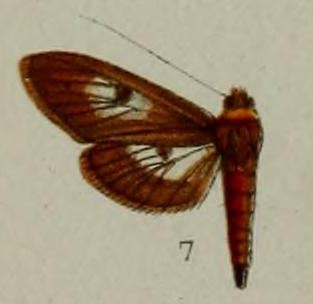
- Piletosoma ignidorsalis

Scientific classification
- Kingdom: Animalia
- Phylum: Arthropoda
- Class: Insecta
- Order: Lepidoptera
- Family: Crambidae
- Subfamily: Pyraustinae
- Genus: Piletosoma; Hampson, 1899

= Piletosoma =

Genus of moths

Piletosoma is a genus of moths of the family Crambidae.

== Species ==
- Piletosoma argoponalis
- Piletosoma caeruleonigra (Schaus, 1912)
- Piletosoma chaquimayalis Schaus, 1924
- Piletosoma guianalis Schaus, 1924
- Piletosoma holophaealis Hampson, 1912
- Piletosoma ignidorsalis Hampson, 1898 (from Peru)
- Piletosoma novalis Walker, 1866
- Piletosoma tacticalis Schaus, 1924
- Piletosoma thialis
