= Tirsa =

Scientific classification
- Domain: Eukaryota
- Kingdom: Animalia
- Phylum: Arthropoda
- Class: Insecta
- Order: Lepidoptera
- Family: Crambidae
- Subfamily: Pyraustinae
- Genus: Tirsa; J. F. G. Clarke, 1971
- Species: T. fiona

Binomial name
- Tirsa fiona J. F. G. Clarke, 1971

Genus of moths

Tirsa is a genus of moths of the family Crambidae, containing only one species Tirsa fiona. It is found in French Polynesia (Rapa Iti).

The wingspan is 24–28 mm. It is a dark brown moth with dark camouflaging speckles throughout its body. It is also known for its long, narrow antennae, which often extend back over its head, rather than ahead.
