= Cyclarcha flavinervis =

Scientific classification
- Domain: Eukaryota
- Kingdom: Animalia
- Phylum: Arthropoda
- Class: Insecta
- Order: Lepidoptera
- Family: Crambidae
- Genus: Cyclarcha
- Species: C. flavinervis

Binomial name
- Cyclarcha flavinervis C. Swinhoe, 1894

Species of moth

Cyclarcha flavinervis is a moth in the family Crambidae. It was described by Charles Swinhoe in 1894. It is found in Meghalaya, India.
