= Pseudepicorsia flavidensalis =

Scientific classification
- Domain: Eukaryota
- Kingdom: Animalia
- Phylum: Arthropoda
- Class: Insecta
- Order: Lepidoptera
- Family: Crambidae
- Genus: Pseudepicorsia
- Species: P. flavidensalis

Binomial name
- Pseudepicorsia flavidensalis (Warren, 1889)

Synonyms
- Hapalia flavidensalis Warren, 1889; Pyrausta thermicruralis Hampson, 1913

Species of moth

Pseudepicorsia flavidensalis is a moth in the family Crambidae. It was described by Warren in 1889. It is found in Brazil and Paraguay.
