= Hyphercyna =

Scientific classification
- Domain: Eukaryota
- Kingdom: Animalia
- Phylum: Arthropoda
- Class: Insecta
- Order: Lepidoptera
- Family: Crambidae
- Subfamily: Pyraustinae
- Genus: Hyphercyna; Sauber, 1899
- Species: H. luedersi

Binomial name
- Hyphercyna luedersi Sauber, 1899

Genus of moths

Hyphercyna is a genus of moths of the family Crambidae. It contains only one species, Hyphercyna luedersi, is found in Central Asia.
