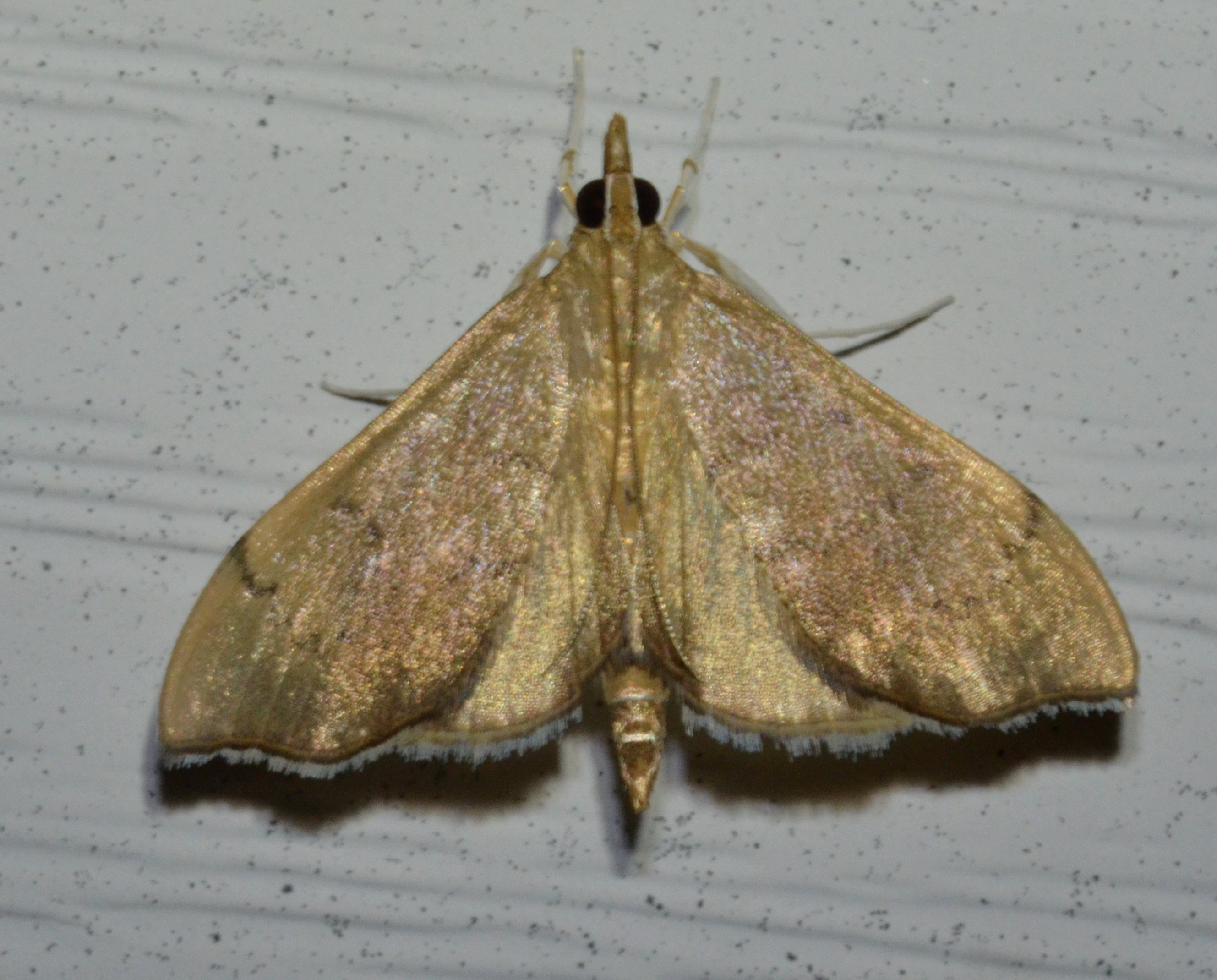

Scientific classification
- Domain: Eukaryota
- Kingdom: Animalia
- Phylum: Arthropoda
- Class: Insecta
- Order: Lepidoptera
- Family: Crambidae
- Subfamily: Pyraustinae
- Genus: Sericoplaga; Warren, 1892
- Species: S. externalis

Binomial name
- Sericoplaga externalis Warren, 1892

Synonyms
- Loxostege maclurae Riley, 1893

= Sericoplaga =

Genus of moths

Sericoplaga is a monotypic moth genus of the family Crambidae described by William Warren in 1892. Its one species, Sericoplaga externalis, described by the same author in the same year, is found in North America, where it has been recorded from Maryland to Illinois, south to Florida and west to Texas.

== Overview ==
Adults have been recorded on wing in February, from April to October and in December.

The larvae feed on Maclura pomifera.
