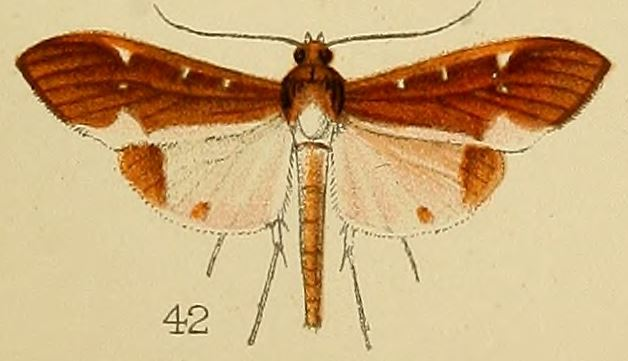

Scientific classification
- Domain: Eukaryota
- Kingdom: Animalia
- Phylum: Arthropoda
- Class: Insecta
- Order: Lepidoptera
- Family: Crambidae
- Subfamily: Pyraustinae
- Genus: Tipuliforma; Kenrick, 1907
- Species: T. triangulalis

Binomial name
- Tipuliforma triangulalis Kenrick, 1907

= Tipuliforma =

Genus of moths

Tipuliforma is a genus of moths of the family Crambidae. It contains only one species, Tipuliforma triangulalis, which is found in New Guinea.
