= Monocoptopera =

Scientific classification
- Kingdom: Animalia
- Phylum: Arthropoda
- Class: Insecta
- Order: Lepidoptera
- Family: Crambidae
- Subfamily: Pyraustinae
- Genus: Monocoptopera; Hampson, 1899
- Species: M. ecmetallescens

Binomial name
- Monocoptopera ecmetallescens Hampson, 1898

Genus of moths

Monocoptopera is a genus of moths of the family Crambidae. It contains only one species, Monocoptopera ecmetallescens, which is found on Ambon Island.
