= Piletosoma tacticalis =

Scientific classification
- Kingdom: Animalia
- Phylum: Arthropoda
- Class: Insecta
- Order: Lepidoptera
- Family: Crambidae
- Genus: Piletosoma
- Species: P. tacticalis

Binomial name
- Piletosoma tacticalis Schaus, 1924

Species of moth

Piletosoma tacticalis is a moth in the family Crambidae. It was described by Schaus in 1924. It is found in Guatemala.
