= Neadeloides =

Scientific classification
- Domain: Eukaryota
- Kingdom: Animalia
- Phylum: Arthropoda
- Class: Insecta
- Order: Lepidoptera
- Family: Crambidae
- Subfamily: Pyraustinae
- Genus: Neadeloides; Klima, 1939
- Species: N. cinerealis

Binomial name
- Neadeloides cinerealis (Moore, 1867)

Synonyms
- Hoterodes cinerealis Moore, 1867; Adeloides Warren, 1892

Genus of insects

Neadeloides is a genus of moth of the family Crambidae. It contains only one species, Neadeloides cinerealis, is found in India (Darjeeling).
