= Aulacoptera philippinensis =

Scientific classification
- Kingdom: Animalia
- Phylum: Arthropoda
- Class: Insecta
- Order: Lepidoptera
- Family: Crambidae
- Genus: Aulacoptera
- Species: A. philippinensis

Binomial name
- Aulacoptera philippinensis Hampson, 1912

Species of moth

Aulacoptera philippinensis is a moth in the family Crambidae. It was described by George Hampson in 1912. It is found on Negros Island in the Philippines.
