= Nephelobotys =

Scientific classification
- Domain: Eukaryota
- Kingdom: Animalia
- Phylum: Arthropoda
- Class: Insecta
- Order: Lepidoptera
- Family: Crambidae
- Subfamily: Pyraustinae
- Genus: Nephelobotys; Munroe & Mutuura, 1970
- Species: N. nephelistalis

Binomial name
- Nephelobotys nephelistalis (Hampson, 1913)

Synonyms
- Pionea nephelistalis Hampson, 1913

Genus of moths

Nephelobotys is a genus of moths of the family Crambidae. It contains only one species, Nephelobotys nephelistalis, which is found in Hubei, China.
