= Torulisquama =

Scientific classification
- Kingdom: Animalia
- Phylum: Arthropoda
- Clade: Pancrustacea
- Class: Insecta
- Order: Lepidoptera
- Family: Crambidae
- Subfamily: Pyraustinae
- Genus: Torulisquama; Zhang & Li, 2010

Genus of moths

Torulisquama is a genus of moths in the family Crambidae. It was described by Zhang and Li in 2010.

== Species ==
- Torulisquama ceratophora Zhang and Li, 2010
- Torulisquama lini Zhang and Li, 2019
- Torulisquama obliquilinealis Zhang and Li, 2010
- Torulisquama ovata Zhang and Li, 2010
- Torulisquama evenoralis
