= Betousa =

Scientific classification
- Kingdom: Animalia
- Phylum: Arthropoda
- Class: Insecta
- Order: Lepidoptera
- Family: Crambidae
- Subfamily: Pyraustinae
- Genus: Betousa; Walker, 1865
- Species: B. dilecta

Binomial name
- Betousa dilecta Walker, 1865

Synonyms
- Generic; Neothyris Warren, 1899; Specific; Siculodes gigantea Pagenstecher, 1896; Neothyris aspirans Warren, 1899; Hypolamprus cossoides Warren, 1899; Omphisa ingens Hampson, 1899

Genus of moths

Betousa is a monotypic moth genus of the family Crambidae described by Francis Walker in 1865. Its only species, Betousa dilecta, was described by the same author in the same year. It is found on the Moluccas, Woodlark Island, St. Aignan, Ternate and Fergusson Island.
