= Piletosoma argoponalis =

Scientific classification
- Kingdom: Animalia
- Phylum: Arthropoda
- Class: Insecta
- Order: Lepidoptera
- Family: Crambidae
- Genus: Piletosoma
- Species: P. argoponalis

Binomial name
- Piletosoma argoponalis Dyar, 1914

Species of moth

Piletosoma argoponalis is a moth in the family Crambidae. It is found in Panama.

The wingspan is about 27 mm. The forewings are brown-black with a bronzy reflection.
