= Daunabotys =

Scientific classification
- Domain: Eukaryota
- Kingdom: Animalia
- Phylum: Arthropoda
- Class: Insecta
- Order: Lepidoptera
- Family: Crambidae
- Subfamily: Pyraustinae
- Genus: Daunabotys; Maes, 2004
- Species: D. bipunctalis

Binomial name
- Daunabotys bipunctalis Maes, 2004

Genus of moths

Daunabotys is a genus of moths of the family Crambidae. It contains only one species, Daunabotys bipunctalis, which is found in Namibia.
