= Leucophotis =

Scientific classification
- Domain: Eukaryota
- Kingdom: Animalia
- Phylum: Arthropoda
- Class: Insecta
- Order: Lepidoptera
- Family: Crambidae
- Subfamily: Pyraustinae
- Genus: Leucophotis; Butler, 1886
- Species: L. pulchra

Binomial name
- Leucophotis pulchra Butler, 1886

Genus of moths

Leucophotis is a genus of moths of the family Crambidae. It contains only one species, Leucophotis pulchra, which is found on Fiji.
