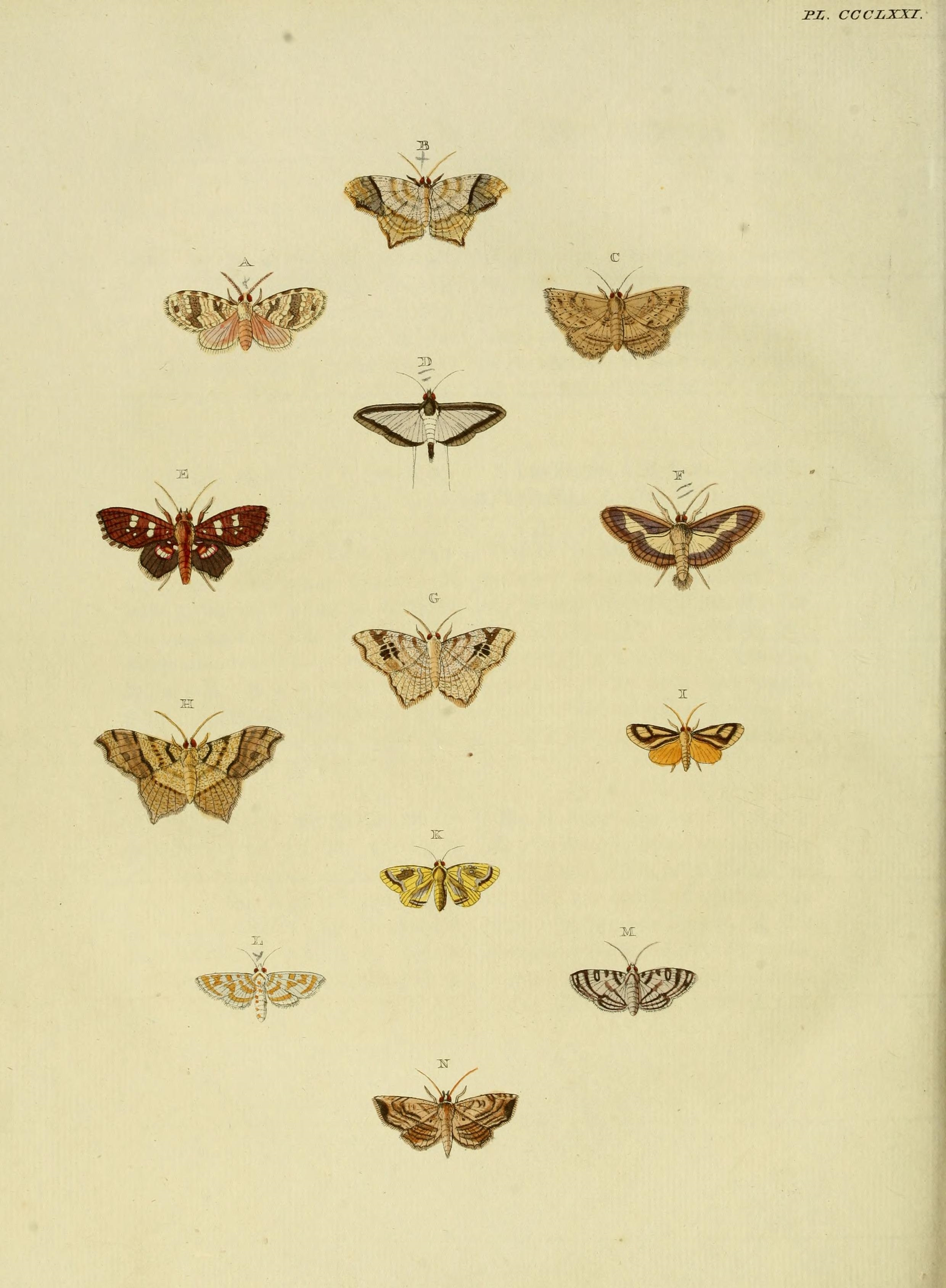
- D: (Phalaena) Marginalis = Cryptographis hyalinata (Linnaeus, 1767)

Scientific classification
- Kingdom: Animalia
- Phylum: Arthropoda
- Clade: Pancrustacea
- Class: Insecta
- Order: Lepidoptera
- Family: Crambidae
- Subfamily: Pyraustinae
- Genus: Cryptographis; Lederer, 1863

= Cryptographis =

Genus of moths

Cryptographis is a genus of moths of the family Crambidae.

== Species ==
- Cryptographis abruptalis
- Cryptographis aclista
- Cryptographis advenalis
- Cryptographis albianalis
- Cryptographis albicincta
- Cryptographis albifascialis
- Cryptographis albifuscalis
- Cryptographis andringitralis
- Cryptographis angustimarga
- Cryptographis antillia
- Cryptographis argealis
- Cryptographis arguta
- Cryptographis aroalis
- Cryptographis attigua
- Cryptographis auricollis
- Cryptographis auricostalis
- Cryptographis aurogrisealis
- Cryptographis beckeri
- Cryptographis brevilinealis
- Cryptographis brunneacollis
- Cryptographis buscki
- Cryptographis capensis
- Cryptographis celestinalis
- Cryptographis clavata
- Cryptographis columbiana
- Cryptographis contactalis
- Cryptographis costaricalis
- Cryptographis cucurbitalis
- Cryptographis culminalis
- Cryptographis cumalis
- Cryptographis curcubitalis
- Cryptographis damalis
- Cryptographis decapitalis
- Cryptographis deosalis
- Cryptographis dohrni
- Cryptographis eburnealis
- Cryptographis elealis
- Cryptographis elegans
- Cryptographis equicincta
- Cryptographis eumeusalis
- Cryptographis eurytornalis
- Cryptographis euryzonalis
- Cryptographis exclusalis
- Cryptographis fimalis
- Cryptographis fuligalis
- Cryptographis fumosalis
- Cryptographis fuscicaudalis
- Cryptographis fuscicollis
- Cryptographis gazorialis
- Cryptographis gigantalis
- Cryptographis gilvidorsis
- Cryptographis glauculalis
- Cryptographis grisealis
- Cryptographis guatemalalis
- Cryptographis guenealis
- Cryptographis hemicitralis
- Cryptographis holophaealis
- Cryptographis holophoenica
- Cryptographis horocrates
- Cryptographis hyalinalis
- Cryptographis hyalinata
- Cryptographis immaculalis
- Cryptographis indica
- Cryptographis infernalis
- Cryptographis infimalis
- Cryptographis intermedialis
- Cryptographis interpositalis
- Cryptographis jacobsalis
- Cryptographis lacustralis
- Cryptographis latilimbalis
- Cryptographis limitalis
- Cryptographis lucernalis
- Cryptographis lucidalis
- Cryptographis lustralis
- Cryptographis magdalenae
- Cryptographis marginalis
- Cryptographis marginepuncta
- Cryptographis marianalis
- Cryptographis mirabilis
- Cryptographis modialis
- Cryptographis monothyralis
- Cryptographis morosalis
- Cryptographis nigricilialis
- Cryptographis nitidalis
- Cryptographis niveocilia
- Cryptographis novicialis
- Cryptographis ochrivitralis
- Cryptographis oeditornalis
- Cryptographis olealis
- Cryptographis oleosalis
- Cryptographis orthozonalis
- Cryptographis peridromella
- Cryptographis perspectalis
- Cryptographis plumbidorsalis
- Cryptographis polypaetalis
- Cryptographis praxialis
- Cryptographis punctilinealis
- Cryptographis purpurea
- Cryptographis sahlkei
- Cryptographis salmenalis
- Cryptographis satanalis
- Cryptographis schroederi
- Cryptographis semaphoralis
- Cryptographis semibrunnea
- Cryptographis stenocraspis
- Cryptographis subauralis
- Cryptographis subtilalis
- Cryptographis superalis
- Cryptographis taenialis
- Cryptographis terminalis
- Cryptographis translucidalis
- Cryptographis venatalis
- Cryptographis vitralis
- Cryptographis zygaenalis

Names brought to synonymy

- Cryptographis semirufalis, a synonym for Desmia semirufalis
- Cryptographis rogenhoferi, a synonym for Palpita elealis
