= Piletosoma caeruleonigra =

Scientific classification
- Kingdom: Animalia
- Phylum: Arthropoda
- Class: Insecta
- Order: Lepidoptera
- Family: Crambidae
- Genus: Piletosoma
- Species: P. caeruleonigra

Binomial name
- Piletosoma caeruleonigra (Schaus, 1912)

Synonyms
- Nacoleia caeruleonigra Schaus, 1912

Species of moth

Piletosoma caeruleonigra is a moth in the family Crambidae. It was described by Schaus in 1912. It is found in Costa Rica.
