= Piletosoma guianalis =

Scientific classification
- Kingdom: Animalia
- Phylum: Arthropoda
- Class: Insecta
- Order: Lepidoptera
- Family: Crambidae
- Genus: Piletosoma
- Species: P. guianalis

Binomial name
- Piletosoma guianalis Schaus, 1924

Species of moth

Piletosoma guianalis is a moth in the family Crambidae. It was described by Schaus in 1924. It is found in Guyana.
