= Megatarsodes =

Scientific classification
- Kingdom: Animalia
- Phylum: Arthropoda
- Clade: Pancrustacea
- Class: Insecta
- Order: Lepidoptera
- Family: Crambidae
- Subfamily: Pyraustinae
- Genus: Megatarsodes; Marion, 1954
- Species: M. baltealis

Binomial name
- Megatarsodes baltealis (Mabille, 1881)

Synonyms
- Stenia baltealis Mabille, 1881

Genus of moths

Megatarsodes is a genus of moths of the family Crambidae. It contains only one species, Megatarsodes baltealis, which is found in Madagascar.
