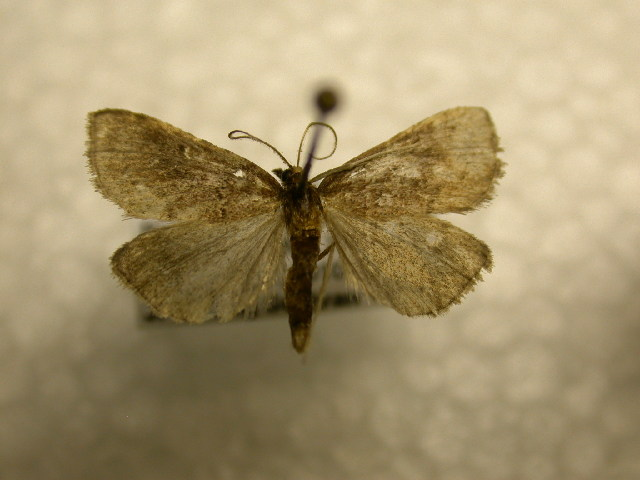

Scientific classification
- Kingdom: Animalia
- Phylum: Arthropoda
- Clade: Pancrustacea
- Class: Insecta
- Order: Lepidoptera
- Family: Crambidae
- Subfamily: Pyraustinae
- Genus: Fumibotys; Munroe, 1976
- Species: F. fumalis

Binomial name
- Fumibotys fumalis (Guenée, 1854)

Synonyms
- Ebulea fumalis Guenée, 1854; Botis badipennis Grote, 1873; Scopula orasusalis Walker, 1859

= Fumibotys =

Genus of moths

Fumibotys is a monotypic genus of moths in the family Crambidae which was described by Eugene G. Munroe in 1976. Its single species, Fumibotys fumalis, the mint root borer moth, described by Achille Guenée in 1854, is found in most of North America.
