= Oronomis =

Scientific classification
- Domain: Eukaryota
- Kingdom: Animalia
- Phylum: Arthropoda
- Class: Insecta
- Order: Lepidoptera
- Family: Crambidae
- Subfamily: Pyraustinae
- Genus: Oronomis; Munroe & Mutuura, 1968
- Species: O. xanthothysana

Binomial name
- Oronomis xanthothysana (Hampson, 1899)

Synonyms
- Pyrausta xanthothysana Hampson, 1899

Genus of moths

Oronomis is a genus of moths of the family Crambidae. It contains only one species, Oronomis xanthothysana, which is found in India (Sikkim).
