= Trigamozeucta =

Scientific classification
- Domain: Eukaryota
- Kingdom: Animalia
- Phylum: Arthropoda
- Class: Insecta
- Order: Lepidoptera
- Family: Crambidae
- Subfamily: Pyraustinae
- Genus: Trigamozeucta; Meyrick, 1937
- Species: T. radiciformis

Binomial name
- Trigamozeucta radiciformis Meyrick, 1937

Genus of moths

Trigamozeucta is a genus of moths of the family Crambidae. It contains only one species, Trigamozeucta radiciformis, which is found on Fiji.
