= Drachma proctocomys =

Scientific classification
- Kingdom: Animalia
- Phylum: Arthropoda
- Class: Insecta
- Order: Lepidoptera
- Family: Crambidae
- Subfamily: Pyraustinae
- Genus: Drachma; Bryk, 1913
- Species: D. proctocomys

Binomial name
- Drachma proctocomys Bryk, 1913

Genus of moths

Drachma is a genus of moths of the family Crambidae. It contains only one species, Drachma proctocomys, which is found in Cameroon.
