= Eustenia =

Scientific classification
- Kingdom: Animalia
- Phylum: Arthropoda
- Class: Insecta
- Order: Lepidoptera
- Family: Crambidae
- Subfamily: Pyraustinae
- Genus: Eustenia; Snellen, 1899
- Species: E. acuminatalis

Binomial name
- Eustenia acuminatalis Snellen, 1899

Genus of moths

Eustenia is a genus of moths of the family Crambidae. It contains only one species, Eustenia acuminatalis, which is found on Java.
