= Anamalaia =

Scientific classification
- Domain: Eukaryota
- Kingdom: Animalia
- Phylum: Arthropoda
- Class: Insecta
- Order: Lepidoptera
- Family: Crambidae
- Subfamily: Pyraustinae
- Genus: Anamalaia; Munroe & Mutuura, 1969
- Species: A. nathani

Binomial name
- Anamalaia nathani Munroe & Mutuura, 1969

Genus of moths

Anamalaia is a genus of moths of the family Crambidae. It contains only one species, Anamalaia nathani, which is found in India.
