= Prodelophanes =

Scientific classification
- Domain: Eukaryota
- Kingdom: Animalia
- Phylum: Arthropoda
- Class: Insecta
- Order: Lepidoptera
- Family: Crambidae
- Subfamily: Pyraustinae
- Genus: Prodelophanes; Meyrick, 1937
- Species: P. eucharis

Binomial name
- Prodelophanes eucharis Meyrick, 1937

Genus of moths

Prodelophanes is a genus of moths of the family Crambidae. It contains only one species, Prodelophanes eucharis, which is found on Fiji.
