= Atelocentra =

Scientific classification
- Kingdom: Animalia
- Phylum: Arthropoda
- Class: Insecta
- Order: Lepidoptera
- Family: Crambidae
- Subfamily: Spilomelinae
- Genus: Atelocentra; Meyrick, 1884
- Species: A. chloraspis

Binomial name
- Atelocentra chloraspis Meyrick, 1884

Synonyms
- Atelocentra chlorapsis

Genus of moths

Atelocentra is a genus of moths of the family Crambidae. It contains only one species, Atelocentra chloraspis, which is found in Australia, where it has been recorded from Queensland, New South Wales and Victoria.

The wingspan is about 20 mm. The forewings are fawn with a greenish-golden patch and a gold mark near the tip.

The larvae feed on Callistemon species. They bore into the stem of the host plant.
