= Aporocosmus =

Scientific classification
- Kingdom: Animalia
- Phylum: Arthropoda
- Class: Insecta
- Order: Lepidoptera
- Family: Crambidae
- Subfamily: Odontiinae
- Genus: Aporocosmus; Butler, 1886
- Species: A. lamprodeta

Binomial name
- Aporocosmus lamprodeta (Meyrick, 1886)

Synonyms
- Aporocosmus bracteatus Butler, 1886; Exeristis argyresthalis Hampson, 1913

Genus of moths

Aporocosmus is a genus of moths in the subfamily Odontiinae of the family Crambidae. It contains only one species, Aporocosmus lamprodeta, which is found in New Guinea and Australia, where it has been recorded from Western Australia, the Northern Territory, Queensland and New South Wales.
