= Paracentristis =

Scientific classification
- Kingdom: Animalia
- Phylum: Arthropoda
- Class: Insecta
- Order: Lepidoptera
- Family: Crambidae
- Subfamily: Pyraustinae
- Genus: Paracentristis; Meyrick, 1934
- Species: P. incommoda

Binomial name
- Paracentristis incommoda Meyrick, 1934

Genus of moths

Paracentristis is a genus of moths of the family Crambidae. It contains only one species, Paracentristis incommoda, which is found in Fiji.
