= Erinothus =

Scientific classification
- Domain: Eukaryota
- Kingdom: Animalia
- Phylum: Arthropoda
- Class: Insecta
- Order: Lepidoptera
- Family: Crambidae
- Subfamily: Pyraustinae
- Genus: Erinothus; Hampson, 1899
- Species: E. lollialis

Binomial name
- Erinothus lollialis Walker, 1859

Genus of moths

Erinothus is a genus of moths of the family Crambidae. It contains only one species, Erinothus lollialis, which is found on Borneo.
