= Ebuleodes =

Scientific classification
- Domain: Eukaryota
- Kingdom: Animalia
- Phylum: Arthropoda
- Class: Insecta
- Order: Lepidoptera
- Family: Crambidae
- Subfamily: Spilomelinae
- Genus: Ebuleodes; Warren, 1896
- Species: E. simplex

Binomial name
- Ebuleodes simplex Warren, 1896

Genus of moths

Ebuleodes is a genus of moths of the family Crambidae. It contains only one species, Ebuleodes simplex, which is found in India (Khasia Hills).
