= Chilopionea =

Scientific classification
- Domain: Eukaryota
- Kingdom: Animalia
- Phylum: Arthropoda
- Class: Insecta
- Order: Lepidoptera
- Family: Crambidae
- Subfamily: Pyraustinae
- Genus: Chilopionea; Munroe, 1964
- Species: C. postcuneifera

Binomial name
- Chilopionea postcuneifera Munroe, 1964

Genus of moths

Chilopionea is a genus of moths of the family Crambidae. It contains only one species, Chilopionea postcuneifera, which is found in Peru.
