= Aplectropus =

Scientific classification
- Kingdom: Animalia
- Phylum: Arthropoda
- Clade: Pancrustacea
- Class: Insecta
- Order: Lepidoptera
- Family: Crambidae
- Subfamily: Pyraustinae
- Genus: Aplectropus; Hampson in Walsingham & Hampson, 1896
- Species: A. leucopis

Binomial name
- Aplectropus leucopis Hampson in Walsingham & Hampson, 1896

Genus of moths

Aplectropus is a genus of moths of the family Crambidae. It contains only one species, Aplectropus leucopis, which is found in Yemen.
