= Endographis =

Scientific classification
- Kingdom: Animalia
- Phylum: Arthropoda
- Class: Insecta
- Order: Lepidoptera
- Family: Crambidae
- Subfamily: Pyraustinae
- Genus: Endographis; Meyrick, 1894
- Species: E. acrochlora

Binomial name
- Endographis acrochlora Meyrick, 1894

Genus of moths

Endographis is a genus of moths of the family Crambidae. It contains only one species, Endographis acrochlora, which is found on Borneo.
