= Acellalis =

Scientific classification
- Kingdom: Animalia
- Phylum: Arthropoda
- Clade: Pancrustacea
- Class: Insecta
- Order: Lepidoptera
- Family: Crambidae
- Subfamily: Pyraustinae
- Genus: Acellalis; Pagenstecher, 1884
- Species: A. iridialis

Binomial name
- Acellalis iridialis Pagenstecher, 1884

Genus of moths

Acellalis is a genus of moths of the family Crambidae. It contains only one species, Acellalis iridialis, which is found in Indonesia (Ambon Island).
