= Endotrichella =

Scientific classification
- Domain: Eukaryota
- Kingdom: Animalia
- Phylum: Arthropoda
- Class: Insecta
- Order: Lepidoptera
- Family: Crambidae
- Subfamily: Pyraustinae
- Genus: Endotrichella; Collins, 1962
- Species: E. margaritifera

Binomial name
- Endotrichella margaritifera (Hampson, 1919)

Synonyms
- Endotrichodes Hampson, 1919; Endotrichodes margaritifera Hampson, 1919

Genus of moths

Endotrichella is a genus of moths of the family Crambidae. It contains only one species, Endotrichella margaritifera, which is found in Papua New Guinea.
