= Arunamalaia =

Scientific classification
- Domain: Eukaryota
- Kingdom: Animalia
- Phylum: Arthropoda
- Class: Insecta
- Order: Lepidoptera
- Family: Crambidae
- Subfamily: Pyraustinae
- Genus: Arunamalaia; Rose & Kirti, 1987
- Species: A. banderdewaensis

Binomial name
- Arunamalaia banderdewaensis Rose & Kirti, 1987

Genus of moths

Arunamalaia is a genus of moths of the family Crambidae. It contains only one species, Arunamalaia banderdewaensis, which is found in India (Arunachal Pradesh).
