= Ectadiosoma =

Scientific classification
- Domain: Eukaryota
- Kingdom: Animalia
- Phylum: Arthropoda
- Class: Insecta
- Order: Lepidoptera
- Family: Crambidae
- Subfamily: Spilomelinae
- Genus: Ectadiosoma; Turner, 1937
- Species: E. straminea

Binomial name
- Ectadiosoma straminea (T. P. Lucas, 1892)

Synonyms
- Pyrausta straminea T. P. Lucas, 1892; Ectadiosoma pleurocapna Turner, 1937; Pachyzancla geminalis Hampson, 1913

Genus of moths

Ectadiosoma is a genus of moths of the family Crambidae. It contains only one species, Ectadiosoma straminea, which is found in Australia, where it has been recorded from Queensland.
