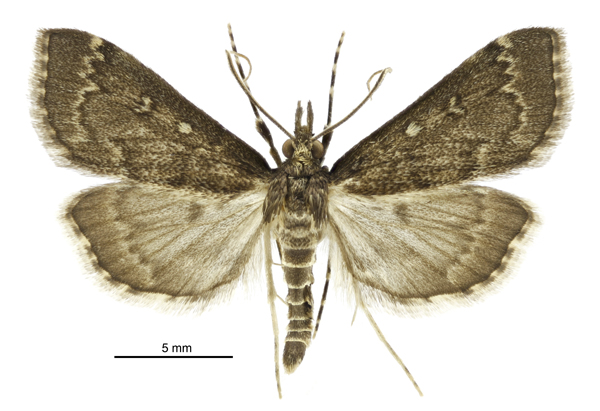
- Male
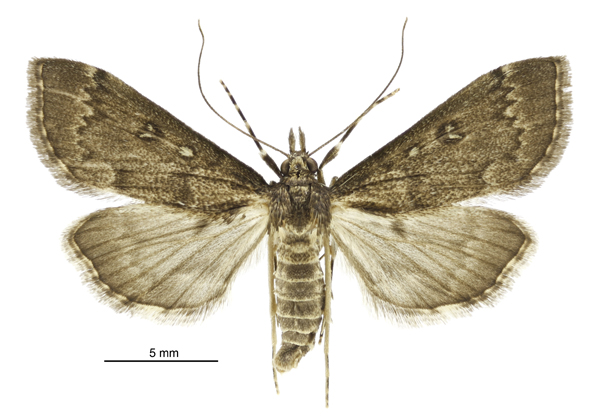
- Female

Scientific classification
- Domain: Eukaryota
- Kingdom: Animalia
- Phylum: Arthropoda
- Class: Insecta
- Order: Lepidoptera
- Family: Crambidae
- Subfamily: Spilomelinae
- Genus: Proternia; Meyrick, 1884
- Species: P. philocapna

Binomial name
- Proternia philocapna Meyrick, 1884

= Proternia =

Genus of moths

Proternia is a monotypic moth genus of the family Crambidae described by Edward Meyrick in 1884. Its only species, Proternia philocapna, described by the same author in the same year, is endemic to New Zealand.

The wingspan is 21–26 mm. The forewings dark fuscous, somewhat mixed with paler markings and with obscurely darker fuscous lines. The first line is irregular and runs from one-third of the costa to before the middle of the inner margin. There is a small round pale-centred spot in the disc before the middle and an 8-shaped pale-centred discal spot. The second line runs from three-fourths of the costa to two-thirds of the inner margin and is followed by an obscure whitish ochreous line. There is an interrupted dark fuscous hind marginal line. The hindwings are fuscous, but darker on the hindmargin and obscurely mixed with whitish ochreous towards the base. There is also a cloudy dark fuscous discal spot and a faint irregular dentate pale posterior line.
