= Pimelephila =

Scientific classification
- Domain: Eukaryota
- Kingdom: Animalia
- Phylum: Arthropoda
- Class: Insecta
- Order: Lepidoptera
- Family: Crambidae
- Subfamily: Pyraustinae
- Genus: Pimelephila; Tams, 1930
- Species: P. ghesquierei

Binomial name
- Pimelephila ghesquierei Tams, 1930

Genus of moths

Pimelephila is a genus of moths of the family Crambidae. It contains only one species, Pimelephila ghesquierei, is found in Benin, the Democratic Republic of Congo (Katanga, East Kasai, Equateur) and Ghana.

The larvae feed on Elaeis guineensis and Ancistrophyllum secundiflorum.
