= Lampridia =

Scientific classification
- Kingdom: Animalia
- Phylum: Arthropoda
- Class: Insecta
- Order: Lepidoptera
- Family: Crambidae
- Subfamily: Pyraustinae
- Genus: Lampridia; Snellen, 1880
- Species: L. fuliginalis

Binomial name
- Lampridia fuliginalis Snellen, (1879)

Genus of moths

Lampridia is a genus of moths of the family Crambidae. It contains only one species, Lampridia fuliginalis, which is found on Sulawesi.
