= Platytesis =

Scientific classification
- Domain: Eukaryota
- Kingdom: Animalia
- Phylum: Arthropoda
- Class: Insecta
- Order: Lepidoptera
- Family: Crambidae
- Subfamily: Pyraustinae
- Genus: Platytesis; Hampson, 1919
- Species: P. semifurva

Binomial name
- Platytesis semifurva Hampson, 1919

Genus of moths

Platytesis is a genus of moths of the family Crambidae. It contains only one species, Platytesis semifurva, which is found in Thailand.
