= Atomoclostis =

Scientific classification
- Kingdom: Animalia
- Phylum: Arthropoda
- Class: Insecta
- Order: Lepidoptera
- Family: Crambidae
- Subfamily: Pyraustinae
- Genus: Atomoclostis; Meyrick, 1934
- Species: A. deltosema

Binomial name
- Atomoclostis deltosema Meyrick, 1934

Genus of moths

Atomoclostis is a genus of moths of the family Crambidae. It contains only one species, Atomoclostis deltosema, which is found on Fiji.
