= Enyocera =

Scientific classification
- Kingdom: Animalia
- Phylum: Arthropoda
- Class: Insecta
- Order: Lepidoptera
- Family: Crambidae
- Subfamily: Pyraustinae
- Genus: Enyocera; Snellen, 1880
- Species: E. latilimbalis

Binomial name
- Enyocera latilimbalis Snellen, [1880]

Genus of moths

Enyocera is a genus of moths of the family Crambidae. It contains only one species, Enyocera latilimbalis, which is found on Sumatra.
