= Eumaragma =

Scientific classification
- Kingdom: Animalia
- Phylum: Arthropoda
- Class: Insecta
- Order: Lepidoptera
- Family: Crambidae
- Subfamily: Pyraustinae
- Genus: Eumaragma; Meyrick, 1933
- Species: E. orthiopis

Binomial name
- Eumaragma orthiopis Meyrick, 1933

Genus of moths

Eumaragma is a genus of moths of the family Crambidae. It contains only one species, Eumaragma orthiopis, which is found in Fiji.
