= Idiusia =

Scientific classification
- Domain: Eukaryota
- Kingdom: Animalia
- Phylum: Arthropoda
- Class: Insecta
- Order: Lepidoptera
- Family: Crambidae
- Subfamily: Pyraustinae
- Genus: Idiusia; Warren, 1896
- Species: I. benepictalis

Binomial name
- Idiusia benepictalis Warren, 1896

Genus of moths

Idiusia is a genus of moths of the family Crambidae. It contains only one species, Idiusia benepictalis, which is found in India (Khasia Hills).
