= Ptiladarcha =

Scientific classification
- Domain: Eukaryota
- Kingdom: Animalia
- Phylum: Arthropoda
- Class: Insecta
- Order: Lepidoptera
- Family: Crambidae
- Subfamily: Pyraustinae
- Genus: Ptiladarcha; Meyrick, 1933
- Species: P. consularis

Binomial name
- Ptiladarcha consularis Meyrick, 1933

Genus of moths

Ptiladarcha is a genus of moths of the family Crambidae. It contains only one species, Ptiladarcha consularis, which is found in Fiji.
