= Aediodina =

Scientific classification
- Kingdom: Animalia
- Phylum: Arthropoda
- Clade: Pancrustacea
- Class: Insecta
- Order: Lepidoptera
- Family: Crambidae
- Subfamily: Spilomelinae
- Genus: Aediodina; Strand, 1919
- Species: A. quaternalis

Binomial name
- Aediodina quaternalis (Lederer, 1863)

Synonyms
- Aediodes quaternalis Lederer, 1863

Genus of moths

Aediodina is a genus of moths of the family Crambidae. It contains only one species, Aediodina quaternalis, which is found on Ambon Island and Taiwan.
