= Asphadastis =

Scientific classification
- Kingdom: Animalia
- Phylum: Arthropoda
- Class: Insecta
- Order: Lepidoptera
- Family: Crambidae
- Subfamily: Pyraustinae
- Genus: Asphadastis; Meyrick, 1934
- Species: A. cryphomycha

Binomial name
- Asphadastis cryphomycha Meyrick, 1934

Genus of moths

Asphadastis is a genus of moths of the family Crambidae. It contains only one species, Asphadastis cryphomycha, which is found on Java.
