= Arenochroa =

Scientific classification
- Domain: Eukaryota
- Kingdom: Animalia
- Phylum: Arthropoda
- Class: Insecta
- Order: Lepidoptera
- Family: Crambidae
- Subfamily: Pyraustinae
- Genus: Arenochroa; Munroe, 1976
- Species: A. flavalis

Binomial name
- Arenochroa flavalis (Fernald, 1894)

Synonyms
- Loxostege flavalis Fernald, 1894; Loxostege unipunctalis Walter, 1928

Genus of moths

Arenochroa is a genus of moths of the family Crambidae. It contains only one species, Arenochroa flavalis, which is found in Mexico and the United States, where it has been recorded from Arizona, Nevada and California.
