= Pectinobotys =

Scientific classification
- Domain: Eukaryota
- Kingdom: Animalia
- Phylum: Arthropoda
- Class: Insecta
- Order: Lepidoptera
- Family: Crambidae
- Subfamily: Spilomelinae
- Genus: Pectinobotys; Munroe, 1959
- Species: P. woytkowskii

Binomial name
- Pectinobotys woytkowskii Munroe, 1959

Genus of moths

Pectinobotys is a monotypic moth genus of the family Crambidae described by Eugene G. Munroe in 1959. Its only species, Pectinobotys woytkowskii, described in the same article, is found in Peru.
