= Cryptocosma =

Scientific classification
- Kingdom: Animalia
- Phylum: Arthropoda
- Clade: Pancrustacea
- Class: Insecta
- Order: Lepidoptera
- Family: Crambidae
- Subfamily: Acentropinae
- Genus: Cryptocosma; Lederer, 1863
- Species: C. perlalis

Binomial name
- Cryptocosma perlalis Lederer, 1863

Synonyms
- Chalcoelopsis Dyar, 1914; Cataclysta trilinealis Warren, 1889; Chalcoelopsis pigrissima Dyar, 1914; Parapoynx obscuralis Möschler, 1881

Genus of moths

Cryptocosma is a genus of moths of the family Crambidae. It contains only one species, Cryptocosma perlalis, which is found in Brazil, Suriname and Panama.
