= Elbursia =

Scientific classification
- Domain: Eukaryota
- Kingdom: Animalia
- Phylum: Arthropoda
- Class: Insecta
- Order: Lepidoptera
- Family: Crambidae
- Subfamily: Spilomelinae
- Genus: Elbursia; Amsel, 1950
- Species: E. stocki

Binomial name
- Elbursia stocki Amsel, 1950

Genus of moths

Elbursia is a genus of moths of the family Crambidae. It contains only one species, Elbursia stocki, which is found in the Alborz Mountains in Iran.
