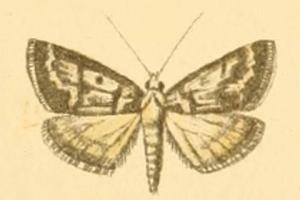

Scientific classification
- Kingdom: Animalia
- Phylum: Arthropoda
- Clade: Pancrustacea
- Class: Insecta
- Order: Lepidoptera
- Family: Crambidae
- Subfamily: Pyraustinae
- Genus: Palepicorsia; Maes, 1995
- Species: P. ustrinalis

Binomial name
- Palepicorsia ustrinalis (Christoph, 1877)

Synonyms
- Botys ustrinalis Christoph, 1877; Metasia emiralis Oberthür, 1888; Metasia excavatalis Ragonot in Staudinger, 1892; Scopula palmalis Swinhoe, 1884

= Palepicorsia =

Genus of moths

Palepicorsia is a genus of moths of the family Crambidae. It contains only one species, Palepicorsia ustrinalis, which is found on Sardinia and in France, Spain and Portugal, as well as in Saudi Arabia, the United Arab Emirates, Yemen, Turkmenistan, Iran, Pakistan and North Africa, including Tunisia.
