= Vittabotys =

Scientific classification
- Domain: Eukaryota
- Kingdom: Animalia
- Phylum: Arthropoda
- Class: Insecta
- Order: Lepidoptera
- Family: Crambidae
- Subfamily: Pyraustinae
- Genus: Vittabotys; Munroe & Mutuura, 1970
- Species: V. mediomaculalis

Binomial name
- Vittabotys mediomaculalis Munroe & Mutuura, 1970

Genus of moths

Vittabotys is a genus of moths of the family Crambidae. It contains only one species, Vittabotys mediomaculalis, which is found in China (Guangdong).
