= Cheloterma =

Scientific classification
- Kingdom: Animalia
- Phylum: Arthropoda
- Class: Insecta
- Order: Lepidoptera
- Family: Crambidae
- Subfamily: Pyraustinae
- Genus: Cheloterma; Meyrick, 1933
- Species: C. invidiosa

Binomial name
- Cheloterma invidiosa Meyrick, 1933

Genus of moths

Cheloterma is a genus of moths of the family Crambidae. It contains only one species, Cheloterma invidiosa, which is found in India (Assam).
