= Plateopsis =

Scientific classification
- Domain: Eukaryota
- Kingdom: Animalia
- Phylum: Arthropoda
- Class: Insecta
- Order: Lepidoptera
- Family: Crambidae
- Subfamily: Spilomelinae
- Genus: Plateopsis; Warren, 1896
- Species: P. vespertilio

Binomial name
- Plateopsis vespertilio Warren, 1896

Genus of moths

Plateopsis is a monotypic moth genus of the family Crambidae described by William Warren in 1896. Its only species, Plateopsis vespertilio, described in the same article, is found in Meghalaya, India.
