= Aeolosma =

Scientific classification
- Kingdom: Animalia
- Phylum: Arthropoda
- Clade: Pancrustacea
- Class: Insecta
- Order: Lepidoptera
- Family: Crambidae
- Subfamily: Pyraustinae
- Genus: Aeolosma; Meyrick, 1938
- Species: A. celata

Binomial name
- Aeolosma celata Meyrick, 1938

Genus of moths

Aeolosma is a genus of moths of the family Crambidae. It contains only one species, Aeolosma celata, which is found on Java.
