= Pyradena =

Scientific classification
- Domain: Eukaryota
- Kingdom: Animalia
- Phylum: Arthropoda
- Class: Insecta
- Order: Lepidoptera
- Family: Crambidae
- Subfamily: Spilomelinae
- Genus: Pyradena; Munroe, 1958
- Species: P. mirifica

Binomial name
- Pyradena mirifica (Caradja, 1931)

Synonyms
- Adena mirifica Caradja, 1931

Genus of moths

Pyradena is a monotypic moth genus of the family Crambidae described by Eugene G. Munroe in 1958. Its only species, Pyradena mirifica, described by Aristide Caradja in 1931, is found in China.
