= Proconica =

Scientific classification
- Domain: Eukaryota
- Kingdom: Animalia
- Phylum: Arthropoda
- Class: Insecta
- Order: Lepidoptera
- Family: Crambidae
- Subfamily: Pyraustinae
- Genus: Proconica; Hampson, 1899

Genus of moths

Proconica is a genus of moths of the family Crambidae.

== Species ==
- Proconica flaviguttalis Hampson, 1899
- Proconica nigrcyanalis Hampson, 1899
