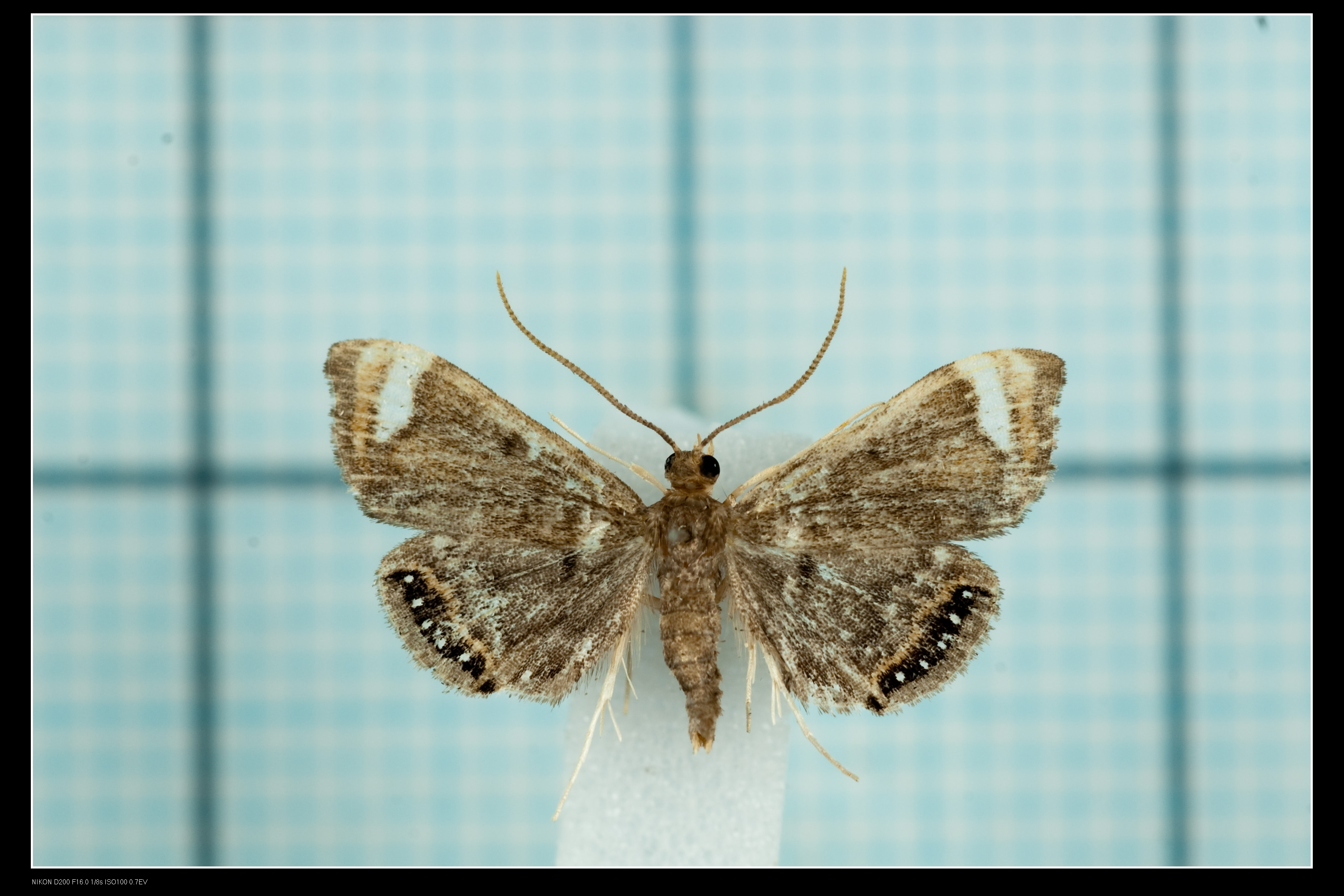
- Eugauria albidentata

Scientific classification
- Kingdom: Animalia
- Phylum: Arthropoda
- Class: Insecta
- Order: Lepidoptera
- Family: Crambidae
- Subfamily: Midilinae
- Genus: Eugauria; Meyrick, 1884
- Species: E. albidentata

Binomial name
- Eugauria albidentata Snellen, 1901

Synonyms
- Generic; Cataclysta Hübner, [1825]; Specific; Cataclysta albidentata Hampson, 1897

= Eugauria =

Genus of moths

Eugauria is a genus of moths of the family Crambidae. It contains only one species, Eugauria albidentata, which is found on Java.
