= Aulacoptera =

Scientific classification
- Domain: Eukaryota
- Kingdom: Animalia
- Phylum: Arthropoda
- Class: Insecta
- Order: Lepidoptera
- Family: Crambidae
- Subfamily: Pyraustinae
- Genus: Aulacoptera; Hampson, 1896

Synonyms
- Aulacophora Swinhoe, 1895

Genus of moths

Aulacoptera is a genus of moths of the family Crambidae. The original name Aulacophora is a junior homonym of the name Aulacophora Dejean, 1835, and was replaced by George Hampson in 1896.

== Species ==
- Aulacoptera fuscinervalis (Swinhoe, 1895)
- Aulacoptera philippinensis Hampson, 1912
