= Ischnoscopa =

Scientific classification
- Domain: Eukaryota
- Kingdom: Animalia
- Phylum: Arthropoda
- Class: Insecta
- Order: Lepidoptera
- Family: Crambidae
- Subfamily: Pyraustinae
- Genus: Ischnoscopa; Meyrick, 1894
- Species: I. chalcozona

Binomial name
- Ischnoscopa chalcozona Meyrick, 1894

Genus of moths

Ischnoscopa is a genus of moths of the family Crambidae. It contains only one species, Ischnoscopa chalcozona, which is found on Sumbawa.
