= Acicys =

Scientific classification
- Kingdom: Animalia
- Phylum: Arthropoda
- Clade: Pancrustacea
- Class: Insecta
- Order: Lepidoptera
- Family: Crambidae
- Subfamily: Spilomelinae
- Genus: Acicys; Turner, 1911
- Species: A. cladaropa

Binomial name
- Acicys cladaropa Turner, 1911

Genus of moths

Acicys is a genus of moths of the family Crambidae. It contains only one species, Acicys cladaropa, which is found in Australia.
