= Ceuthobotys =

Scientific classification
- Domain: Eukaryota
- Kingdom: Animalia
- Phylum: Arthropoda
- Class: Insecta
- Order: Lepidoptera
- Family: Crambidae
- Subfamily: Pyraustinae
- Genus: Ceuthobotys; Munroe, 1978
- Species: C. penai

Binomial name
- Ceuthobotys penai Munroe, 1978

Genus of moths

Ceuthobotys is a genus of moths of the family Crambidae. It contains only one species, Ceuthobotys penai, which is found in Peru.
