= Pyralausta =

Scientific classification
- Domain: Eukaryota
- Kingdom: Animalia
- Phylum: Arthropoda
- Class: Insecta
- Order: Lepidoptera
- Family: Crambidae
- Subfamily: Pyraustinae
- Genus: Pyralausta; Hampson, 1913
- Species: P. bivialis

Binomial name
- Pyralausta bivialis Hampson, 1913

Genus of moths

Pyralausta is a genus of moths of the family Crambidae. It contains only one species, Pyralausta bivialis, which is found on Borneo.
