= Prodasycnemis =

Scientific classification
- Domain: Eukaryota
- Kingdom: Animalia
- Phylum: Arthropoda
- Class: Insecta
- Order: Lepidoptera
- Family: Crambidae
- Subfamily: Pyraustinae
- Genus: Prodasycnemis; Warren, 1892
- Species: P. inornata

Binomial name
- Prodasycnemis inornata (Butler, 1879)

Synonyms
- Botys inornata Butler, 1879

Genus of moths

Prodasycnemis is a genus of moths of the family Crambidae. It contains only one species, Prodasycnemis inornata, which is found in Japan and Russia.
