= Pyraustimorpha =

Scientific classification
- Domain: Eukaryota
- Kingdom: Animalia
- Phylum: Arthropoda
- Class: Insecta
- Order: Lepidoptera
- Family: Crambidae
- Subfamily: Pyraustinae
- Genus: Pyraustimorpha; Koçak & Seven, 1995
- Species: P. inexpectata

Binomial name
- Pyraustimorpha inexpectata Koçak & Seven, 1995

Genus of moths

Pyraustimorpha is a monotypic moth genus of the family Crambidae described by Ahmet Ömer Koçak and Selma Seven in 1995. It contains only one species, Pyraustimorpha inexpectata, which is found in Turkey.
