= Aboetheta =

Scientific classification
- Kingdom: Animalia
- Phylum: Arthropoda
- Clade: Pancrustacea
- Class: Insecta
- Order: Lepidoptera
- Family: Crambidae
- Subfamily: Spilomelinae
- Genus: Aboetheta; Turner, 1914
- Species: A. pteridonoma

Binomial name
- Aboetheta pteridonoma Turner, 1914

Genus of moths

Aboetheta is a monotypic moth genus of the Spilomelinae subfamily of the Crambidae described by Alfred Jefferis Turner in 1914. The sole species in the genus, Aboetheta pteridonoma, was described by the same author in the same year, and is found in Australia.
