= Cyclarcha =

Scientific classification
- Domain: Eukaryota
- Kingdom: Animalia
- Phylum: Arthropoda
- Class: Insecta
- Order: Lepidoptera
- Family: Crambidae
- Subfamily: Pyraustinae
- Genus: Cyclarcha; C. Swinhoe, 1894

Genus of moths

Cyclarcha is a genus of moths of the family Crambidae. The genus was erected by Charles Swinhoe in 1894.

== Species ==
- Cyclarcha atristrigalis C. Swinhoe, 1894
- Cyclarcha flavinervis C. Swinhoe, 1894
