= Indogrammodes =

Scientific classification
- Kingdom: Animalia
- Phylum: Arthropoda
- Class: Insecta
- Order: Lepidoptera
- Family: Crambidae
- Subfamily: Spilomelinae
- Genus: Indogrammodes; Kirti & Rose, 1989
- Species: I. pectinicornalis

Binomial name
- Indogrammodes pectinicornalis (Guenée, 1854)

Synonyms
- Botys pectinicornalis Guenée, 1854; Pachynoa pectinicornis Munroe, 1958

Genus of moths

Indogrammodes is a genus of moths of the family Crambidae. It contains only one species, Indogrammodes pectinicornalis, which is found in India.
