= Eretmopteryx =

Scientific classification
- Kingdom: Animalia
- Phylum: Arthropoda
- Clade: Pancrustacea
- Class: Insecta
- Order: Lepidoptera
- Family: Crambidae
- Subfamily: Pyraustinae
- Genus: Eretmopteryx; Saalmüller, 1884
- Species: E. flabelligera

Binomial name
- Eretmopteryx flabelligera (Saalmüller, 1884)

Synonyms
- Barsine flabelligera Saalmüller, 1884

Genus of moths

Eretmopteryx is a genus of moths of the family Crambidae. It contains only one species, Eretmopteryx flabelligera, which is found in Madagascar.
