= Carminibotys =

Scientific classification
- Domain: Eukaryota
- Kingdom: Animalia
- Phylum: Arthropoda
- Class: Insecta
- Order: Lepidoptera
- Family: Crambidae
- Subfamily: Pyraustinae
- Genus: Carminibotys; Munroe & Mutuura, 1971
- Species: C. carminalis

Binomial name
- Carminibotys carminalis (Caradja, 1925)

Synonyms
- Pyrausta carminalis Caradja, 1925

Genus of moths

Carminibotys is a genus of moths of the family Crambidae. It contains only one species, Carminibotys carminalis, which is found in Russia, China and Japan.

== Species ==
- Carminibotys carminalis carminalis (China)
- Carminibotys carminalis iwawakisana Munroe & Mutuura, 1971 (Japan)
