= Clatrodes =

Scientific classification
- Kingdom: Animalia
- Phylum: Arthropoda
- Class: Insecta
- Order: Lepidoptera
- Family: Crambidae
- Subfamily: Pyraustinae
- Genus: Clatrodes; Marion & Viette, 1953
- Species: C. squaleralis

Binomial name
- Clatrodes squaleralis Marion & Viette, 1953

Genus of moths

Clatrodes is a genus of moths of the family Crambidae. It contains only one species, Clatrodes squaleralis, which is found in Madagascar.
