= Pyrasia =

Scientific classification
- Domain: Eukaryota
- Kingdom: Animalia
- Phylum: Arthropoda
- Class: Insecta
- Order: Lepidoptera
- Family: Crambidae
- Subfamily: Pyraustinae
- Genus: Pyrasia; M. O. Martin, 1986
- Species: P. gutturalis

Binomial name
- Pyrasia gutturalis (Staudinger, 1879)

Synonyms
- Botys gutturalis Staudinger, 1879

Genus of moths

Pyrasia is a genus of moths of the family Crambidae. It contains only one species, Pyrasia gutturalis, which is found in Turkey.
