= Lotanga =

Scientific classification
- Domain: Eukaryota
- Kingdom: Animalia
- Phylum: Arthropoda
- Class: Insecta
- Order: Lepidoptera
- Family: Crambidae
- Subfamily: Pyraustinae
- Genus: Lotanga; Moore, 1886
- Species: L. milvinalis

Binomial name
- Lotanga milvinalis Moore, 1886

Genus of moths

Lotanga is a genus of moths of the family Crambidae. It contains only one species, Lotanga milvinalis, which is found in Sri Lanka.
