= Ametrea =

Scientific classification
- Domain: Eukaryota
- Kingdom: Animalia
- Phylum: Arthropoda
- Class: Insecta
- Order: Lepidoptera
- Family: Crambidae
- Subfamily: Spilomelinae
- Genus: Ametrea; Munroe, 1964
- Species: A. nebulalis

Binomial name
- Ametrea nebulalis (Walker, 1866)

Synonyms
- Leucochroma nebulalis Walker, 1866

Genus of moths

Ametrea is a genus of moths of the family Crambidae. It contains only one species, Ametrea nebulalis, which is found on the Sula Islands.
