= Elosita =

Scientific classification
- Domain: Eukaryota
- Kingdom: Animalia
- Phylum: Arthropoda
- Class: Insecta
- Order: Lepidoptera
- Family: Crambidae
- Subfamily: Pyraustinae
- Genus: Elosita; Snellen, 1899
- Species: E. fuscocilialis

Binomial name
- Elosita fuscocilialis Snellen, 1899

Synonyms
- Crocidophora fuscocilialis

Genus of moths

Elosita is a genus of moths of the family Crambidae. It contains only one species, Elosita fuscocilialis, which is found on Java.
