= Emphylica =

Scientific classification
- Domain: Eukaryota
- Kingdom: Animalia
- Phylum: Arthropoda
- Class: Insecta
- Order: Lepidoptera
- Family: Crambidae
- Subfamily: Pyraustinae
- Genus: Emphylica; Turner, 1913
- Species: E. xanthocrossa

Binomial name
- Emphylica xanthocrossa Turner, 1913

Genus of moths

Emphylica is a monotypic moth genus of the family Crambidae described by Alfred Jefferis Turner in 1913. It contains only one species, Emphylica xanthocrossa, described in the same article, which is found in Australia, where it has been recorded from the Northern Territory.

The wingspan is 14 mm. The forewings are purple reddish with a large triangular orange spot on the costa beyond the middle. The hindwings are whitish ochreous with a broad pale-fuscous terminal band and the terminal edge is orange, except towards the tornus.
