= Phryganomima =

Scientific classification
- Domain: Eukaryota
- Kingdom: Animalia
- Phylum: Arthropoda
- Class: Insecta
- Order: Lepidoptera
- Family: Crambidae
- Genus: Phryganomima; Hampson, 1917
- Species: P. noctifer

Binomial name
- Phryganomima noctifer (Dognin, 1911)

Synonyms
- Phryganodes noctifer Dognin, 1911

Genus of moths

Phryganomima is a genus of moths of the family Crambidae. It contains only one species, Phryganomima noctifer, which is found in Colombia.
