= Leptosophista =

Scientific classification
- Kingdom: Animalia
- Phylum: Arthropoda
- Class: Insecta
- Order: Lepidoptera
- Family: Crambidae
- Subfamily: Pyraustinae
- Genus: Leptosophista; Meyrick, 1938
- Species: L. aleatrix

Binomial name
- Leptosophista aleatrix Meyrick, 1938

Genus of moths

Leptosophista is a genus of moths of the family Crambidae. It contains only one species, Leptosophista aleatrix, which is found on Java.
