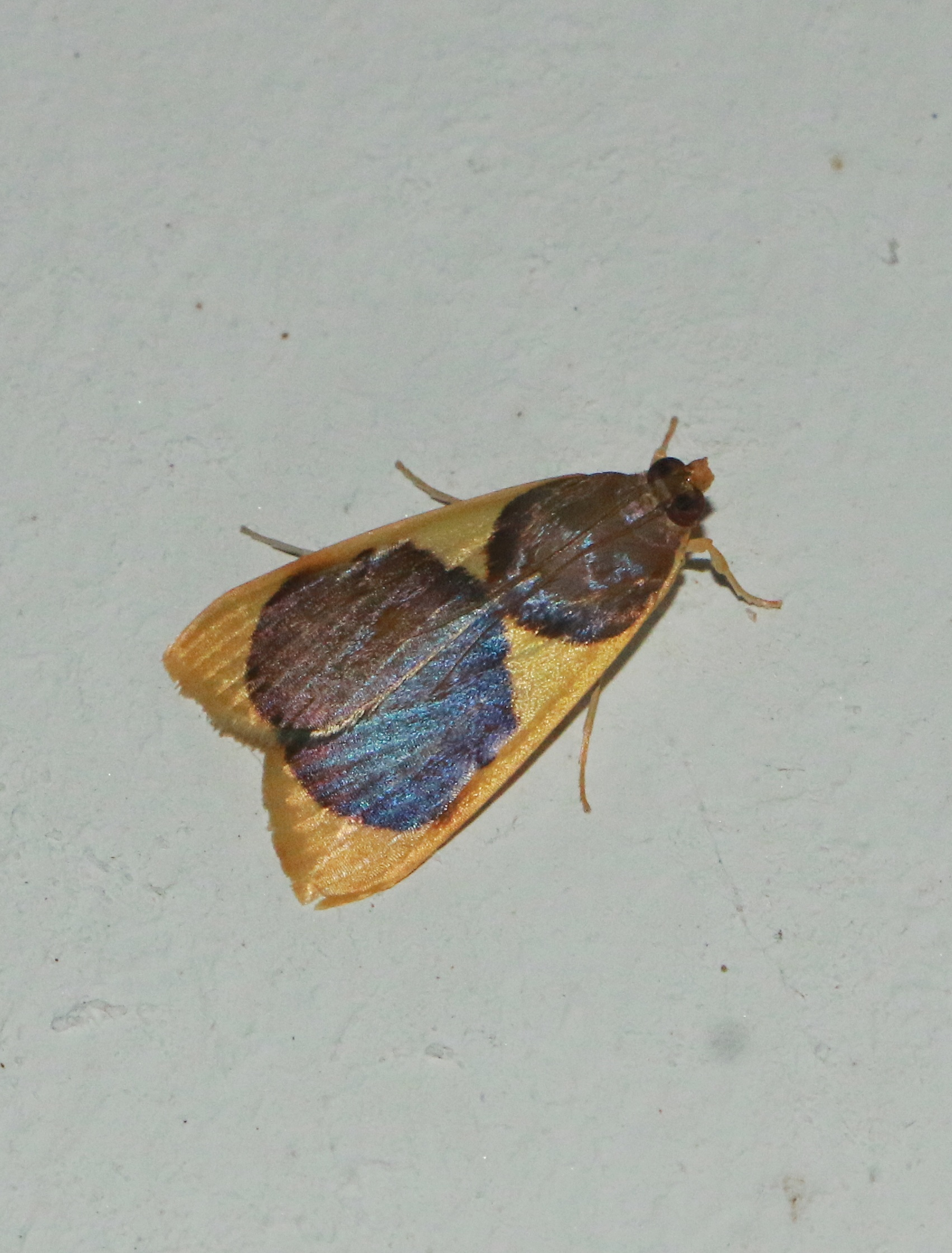
- Prooedema inscisalis

Scientific classification
- Domain: Eukaryota
- Kingdom: Animalia
- Phylum: Arthropoda
- Class: Insecta
- Order: Lepidoptera
- Family: Crambidae
- Subfamily: Pyraustinae
- Genus: Prooedema; Hampson, 1896
- Species: P. inscisalis

Binomial name
- Prooedema inscisalis (Walker, 1865)

Synonyms
- Botys inscisale Hampson, 1896

= Prooedema =

Genus of moths

Prooedema is a monotypic moth genus of the family Crambidae described by George Hampson. Its only species, Prooedema inscisalis, described by Francis Walker in 1865, is found in India, China, Indonesia, the Philippines, Papua New Guinea and Australia, where it has been recorded from the Northern Territory and Queensland.
