= Pseudopolygrammodes =

Scientific classification
- Kingdom: Animalia
- Phylum: Arthropoda
- Class: Insecta
- Order: Lepidoptera
- Family: Crambidae
- Subfamily: Pyraustinae
- Genus: Pseudopolygrammodes; Munroe & Mutuura, 1969
- Species: P. priscalis

Binomial name
- Pseudopolygrammodes priscalis (Caradja in Caradja & Meyrick, 1937)

Synonyms
- Polygrammodes priscalis Caradja in Caradja & Meyrick, 1937

Genus of moths

Pseudopolygrammodes is a genus of moths of the family Crambidae. It contains only one species, Pseudopolygrammodes priscalis, which is found in China (Yunnan).
