= Patissodes =

Scientific classification
- Domain: Eukaryota
- Kingdom: Animalia
- Phylum: Arthropoda
- Class: Insecta
- Order: Lepidoptera
- Family: Crambidae
- Subfamily: Pyraustinae
- Genus: Patissodes; Hampson, 1919
- Species: P. fulvinotata

Binomial name
- Patissodes fulvinotata Hampson, 1919

Genus of moths

Patissodes is a monotypic moth genus of the family Crambidae described by George Hampson in 1919. Its only species, Patissodes fulvinotata, described by the same author in the same year, is found in Singapore.
