= Lumenia =

Scientific classification
- Domain: Eukaryota
- Kingdom: Animalia
- Phylum: Arthropoda
- Class: Insecta
- Order: Lepidoptera
- Family: Crambidae
- Subfamily: Pyraustinae
- Genus: Lumenia de Joannis, 1929
- Species: L. colocasiae

Binomial name
- Lumenia colocasiae de Joannis, 1930

Genus of moths

Lumenia is a genus of moths of the family Crambidae. It contains only one species, Lumenia colocasiae, which is found in Vietnam.
