= Peribona =

Scientific classification
- Domain: Eukaryota
- Kingdom: Animalia
- Phylum: Arthropoda
- Class: Insecta
- Order: Lepidoptera
- Family: Crambidae
- Subfamily: Pyraustinae
- Genus: Peribona; Snellen, 1895
- Species: P. venosa

Binomial name
- Peribona venosa (Butler, 1889)

Synonyms
- Generic; Radiorista Warren, 1896; Tyspanodes Hampson, 1898; Specific; Heterocnephes venosa Butler, 1889; Radiorista venosa

Genus of moths

Peribona is a monotypic moth genus of the family Crambidae described by Pieter Cornelius Tobias Snellen in 1895. It contains only one species, Peribona venosa, described by Arthur Gardiner Butler in 1889, which is found in the Himalayas and on Java.
