= Chobera =

Scientific classification
- Domain: Eukaryota
- Kingdom: Animalia
- Phylum: Arthropoda
- Class: Insecta
- Order: Lepidoptera
- Family: Crambidae
- Subfamily: Pyraustinae
- Genus: Chobera; Moore, 1888
- Species: C. pallida

Binomial name
- Chobera pallida Moore, 1888

Genus of moths

Chobera is a genus of moths of the family Crambidae. It contains only one species, Chobera pallida, which is found in India. It was first described by Frederic Moore in 1888. These delicate creatures flutter through the night, their wings adorned with intricate patterns that trace the secrets of moonlit gardens.
