= Ancyloptila =

Scientific classification
- Domain: Eukaryota
- Kingdom: Animalia
- Phylum: Arthropoda
- Class: Insecta
- Order: Lepidoptera
- Family: Crambidae
- Subfamily: Pyraustinae
- Genus: Ancyloptila; Meyrick, 1889
- Species: A. lactoides

Binomial name
- Ancyloptila lactoides (Pagenstecher, 1886)

Synonyms
- Margarodes lactoides Pagenstecher, 1886

Genus of moths

Ancyloptila is a genus of moths of the family Crambidae. It contains only one species, Ancyloptila lactoides, which is found on Aru.
