= Pelinopsis =

Scientific classification
- Kingdom: Animalia
- Phylum: Arthropoda
- Class: Insecta
- Order: Lepidoptera
- Family: Crambidae
- Subfamily: Spilomelinae
- Genus: Pelinopsis; Dognin, 1905
- Species: P. pachyzanclodes

Binomial name
- Pelinopsis pachyzanclodes Dognin, 1905

Synonyms
- Pelinopsis pachyzancloides Munroe, 1995

Genus of moths

Pelinopsis is a monotypic moth genus of the family Crambidae described by Paul Dognin in 1905. Its only species, Pelinopsis pachyzanclodes, described at the same time, is found in Loja Province, Ecuador.
