= Chilocorsia =

Scientific classification
- Domain: Eukaryota
- Kingdom: Animalia
- Phylum: Arthropoda
- Class: Insecta
- Order: Lepidoptera
- Family: Crambidae
- Subfamily: Pyraustinae
- Genus: Chilocorsia; Munroe, 1964
- Species: C. punctinotalis

Binomial name
- Chilocorsia punctinotalis (Dognin, 1905)

Synonyms
- Phlyctaenodes punctinotalis Dognin, 1905

Genus of moths

Chilocorsia is a genus of moths of the family Crambidae. It contains only one species, Chilocorsia punctinotalis, which is found in Ecuador (Loja Province).
