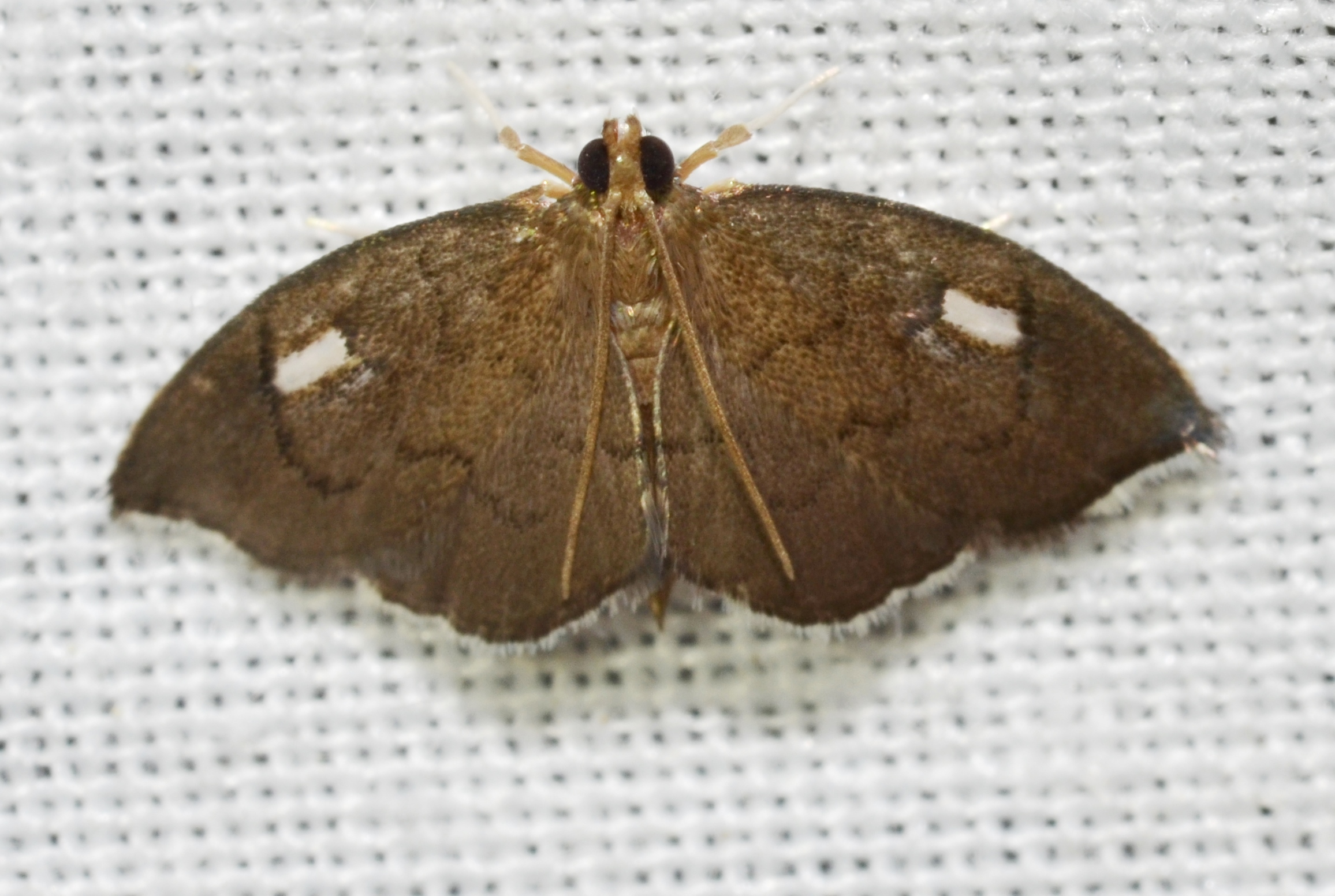
- Perispasta caeculalis

Scientific classification
- Kingdom: Animalia
- Phylum: Arthropoda
- Class: Insecta
- Order: Lepidoptera
- Family: Crambidae
- Subfamily: Pyraustinae
- Genus: Perispasta; Zeller, 1875
- Species: P. caeculalis

Binomial name
- Perispasta caeculalis Zeller, 1875

Synonyms
- Perispasta immixtalis Grote, 1881

= Perispasta =

Genus of moths

Perispasta is a genus of moths of the family Crambidae. It contains only one species, Perispasta caeculalis, or Titian Peale's pyralid moth, which is found in North America, where it has been recorded from Quebec west to British Columbia, south to Florida, Texas and Colorado. The habitat consists of fields and meadows. Both the genus and species were first described by Philipp Christoph Zeller in 1875.

The wingspan is 16–18 mm. The forewings are dark brown with a white discal bar. The hindwings are white. Adults have been recorded on wing from January to November, depending on the location.
