= Polygrammopsis =

Scientific classification
- Kingdom: Animalia
- Phylum: Arthropoda
- Class: Insecta
- Order: Lepidoptera
- Family: Crambidae
- Subfamily: Spilomelinae
- Genus: Polygrammopsis; Munroe, 1960
- Species: P. forsteri

Binomial name
- Polygrammopsis forsteri Munroe, 1960

Genus of moths

Polygrammopsis is a monotypic moth genus of the family Crambidae described by Eugene G. Munroe in 1960. Its only species, Polygrammopsis forsteri, described in the same paper, is found in Ecuador.
