= Herpetobotys =

Scientific classification
- Domain: Eukaryota
- Kingdom: Animalia
- Phylum: Arthropoda
- Class: Insecta
- Order: Lepidoptera
- Family: Crambidae
- Subfamily: Spilomelinae
- Genus: Herpetobotys; Maes, 2001

Genus of moths

Herpetobotys is a genus of moths of the family Crambidae.

== Species ==
- Herpetobotys camerounensis Maes, 2001
- Herpetobotys kenyensis Maes, 2001
- Herpetobotys ugandae Maes, 2001
