= Epiecia =

Scientific classification
- Domain: Eukaryota
- Kingdom: Animalia
- Phylum: Arthropoda
- Class: Insecta
- Order: Lepidoptera
- Family: Crambidae
- Subfamily: Pyraustinae
- Genus: Epiecia; Walker, 1866
- Species: E. externella

Binomial name
- Epiecia externella Walker, 1866

Genus of moths

Epiecia is a genus of moths of the family Crambidae. It contains only one species, Epiecia externella, which is found in Australia, where it has been recorded from Queensland.
