= Coelobathra =

Scientific classification
- Domain: Eukaryota
- Kingdom: Animalia
- Phylum: Arthropoda
- Class: Insecta
- Order: Lepidoptera
- Family: Crambidae
- Subfamily: Pyraustinae
- Genus: Coelobathra; Turner, 1908
- Species: C. ochromorpha

Binomial name
- Coelobathra ochromorpha (Lower, 1902)

Synonyms
- Phlyctenodes ochromorpha Lower, 1902; Coelobathra eucrines Turner, 1908; Metasia thelcteria Turner, 1913

Genus of moths

Coelobathra is a genus of moths of the family Crambidae. It contains only one species, Coelobathra ochromorpha, which is found in Australia.
