= Pseudepicorsia =

Scientific classification
- Domain: Eukaryota
- Kingdom: Animalia
- Phylum: Arthropoda
- Class: Insecta
- Order: Lepidoptera
- Family: Crambidae
- Subfamily: Pyraustinae
- Genus: Pseudepicorsia; Munroe, 1964

Genus of moths

Pseudepicorsia is a genus of moths of the family Crambidae.

== Species ==
- Pseudepicorsia boliviensis Munroe, 1964
- Pseudepicorsia flavidensalis (Warren, 1889)
- Pseudepicorsia septentrionis Munroe, 1964
- Pseudepicorsia trispinalis (Amsel, 1956)
