= Atralata =

Scientific classification
- Domain: Eukaryota
- Kingdom: Animalia
- Phylum: Arthropoda
- Class: Insecta
- Order: Lepidoptera
- Family: Crambidae
- Subfamily: Odontiinae
- Tribe: Odontiini
- Genus: Atralata; Sylvén, 1947
- Species: A. albofascialis

Binomial name
- Atralata albofascialis (Treitschke, 1829)

Synonyms
- Genus: Ennychia Lederer, 1863; Species: Ennychia albofascialis Treitschke, 1829; Ennychia minutalis A. Speyer, 1868

Genus of moths

Atralata is a genus of moths of the family Crambidae. It contains only one species, Atralata albofascialis, which is found in most of Europe, except Ireland, Great Britain, Norway, Finland, Lithuania and Greece.

The wingspan is 10–14 mm. There are two generations per year.

The larvae feed on Inula conyzae. They mine the leaves of their host plant. Larvae can be found from May to August.
