= Achilo =

Scientific classification
- Kingdom: Animalia
- Phylum: Arthropoda
- Clade: Pancrustacea
- Class: Insecta
- Order: Lepidoptera
- Family: Crambidae
- Subfamily: Crambinae
- Tribe: Haimbachiini
- Genus: Achilo; Amsel, 1957
- Species: A. lignella

Binomial name
- Achilo lignella (Amsel, 1956)

Synonyms
- Chilopsis Amsel, 1956; Chilopsis lignella Amsel, 1956

Genus of moths

Achilo is a genus of moths of the family Crambidae. It contains only one species, Achilo lignella, which is found in Venezuela.
