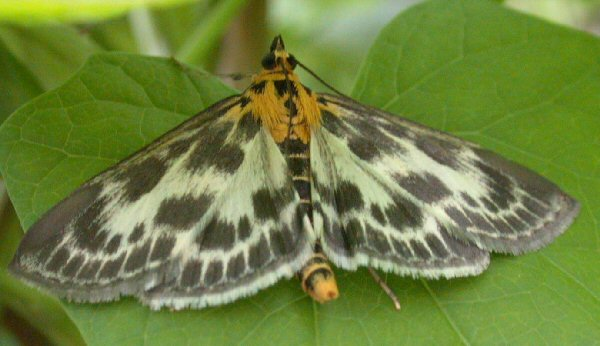
- Small magpie, Anania hortulata

Scientific classification
- Kingdom: Animalia
- Phylum: Arthropoda
- Class: Insecta
- Order: Lepidoptera
- Family: Crambidae
- Subfamily: Pyraustinae; Meyrick, 1890

Genera
- See text

= Pyraustinae =

Subfamily of moths

Pyraustinae is a large subfamily of the lepidopteran family Crambidae, the crambid snout moths. It currently includes about 1,280 species Most of them tropical but some found in temperate regions including both North America and Europe.

The subfamily Pyraustinae originally included the taxa now in Spilomelinae as tribe Spilomelini, with the taxa in the subfamily as now circumscribed treated as tribe Pyraustini. It has not been fully established yet which taxa of the Pyraustinae sensu lato belong to Pyraustinae as currently understood; thus the number of species in this subfamily is set to increase (although the Spilomelinae are the larger group of the old Pyraustinae).

Taxonomists' opinions differ as to the correct placement of the Crambidae, some authorities treating them as a subfamily (Crambinae) of the family Pyralidae. If this is done, Pyraustinae is usually treated as a separate subfamily within Pyralidae.

Pyraustinae are currently subdivided into three tribes: Euclastini, Portentomorphini and Pyraustini.

The Pyraustinae are characterised by atrophied spinula and venulae in the tympanal organs; a narrow fornix tympani; a longitudinal groove with androconial scales on the male mesothoracic tibiae; an often spinose antrum; and a sella (a medially directed clasper on the inside of the valvae), and an editum with modified setae on the male valvae.

Many species have larvae that bore into stems and fruit of plants, and several, notably from the genus Ostrinia, are serious agricultural pests.

== Life cycle ==
Life cycle of Saucrobotys futilalis

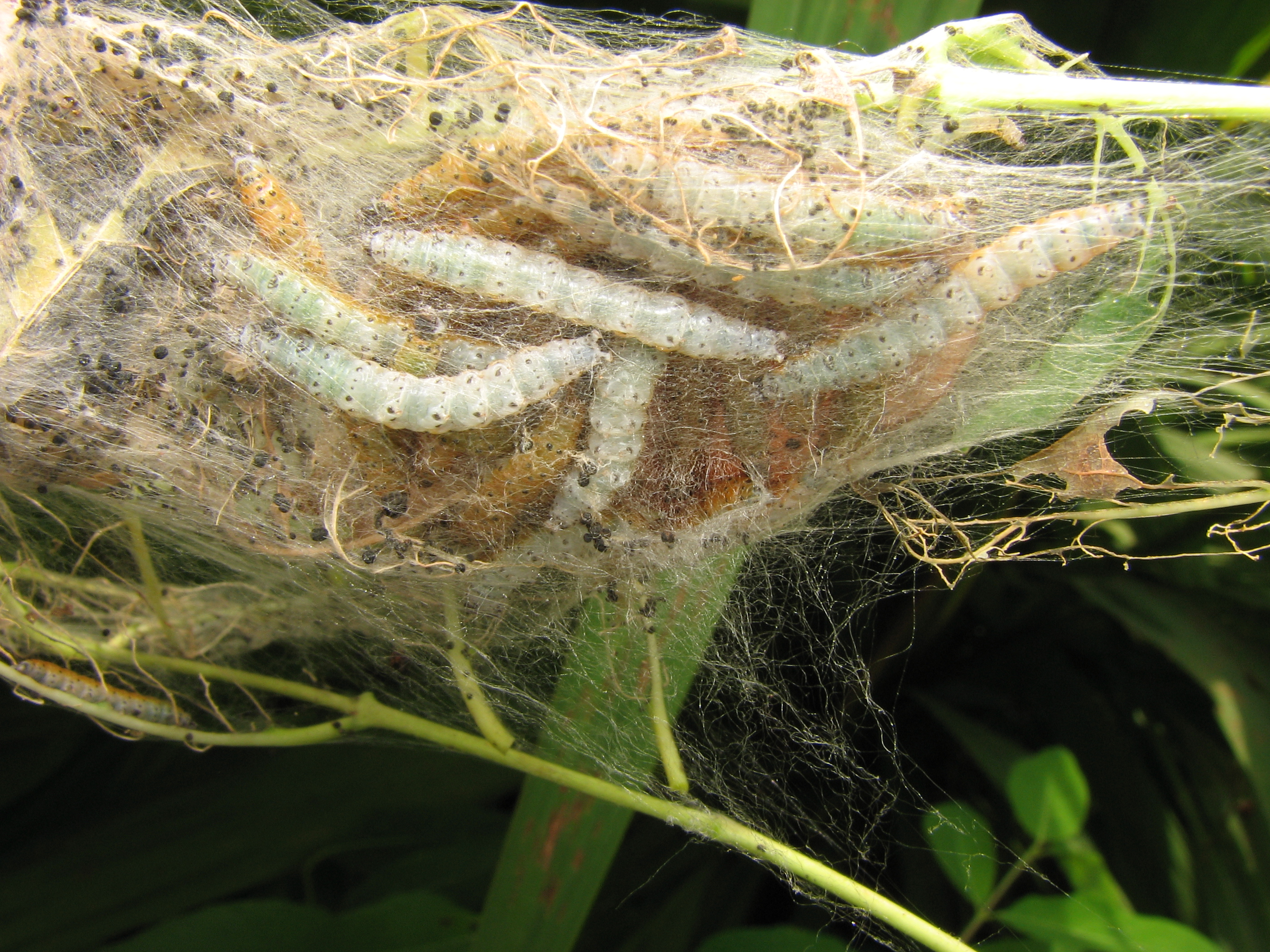
Larvae in web

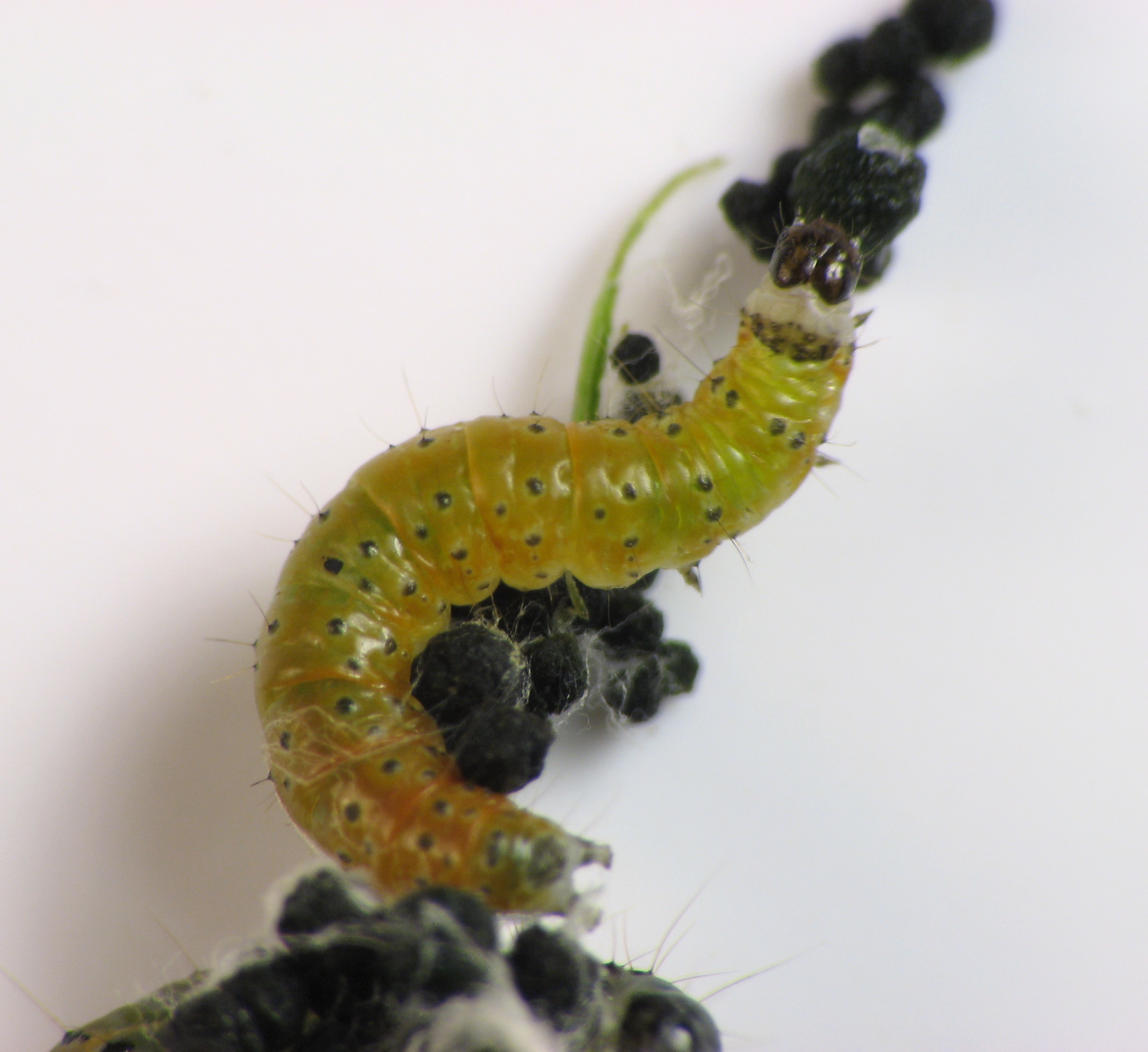
Larva

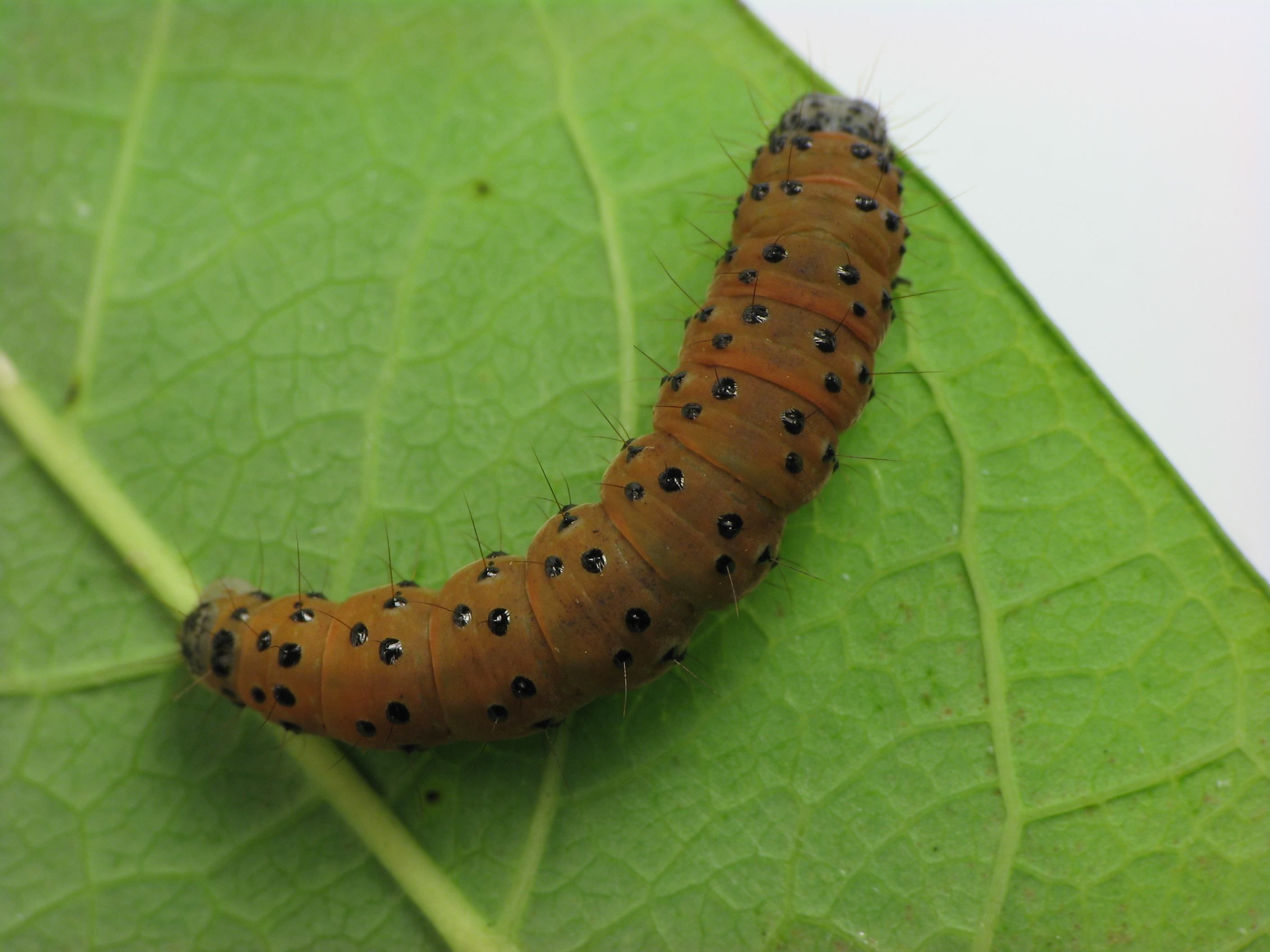
Larva, final instar

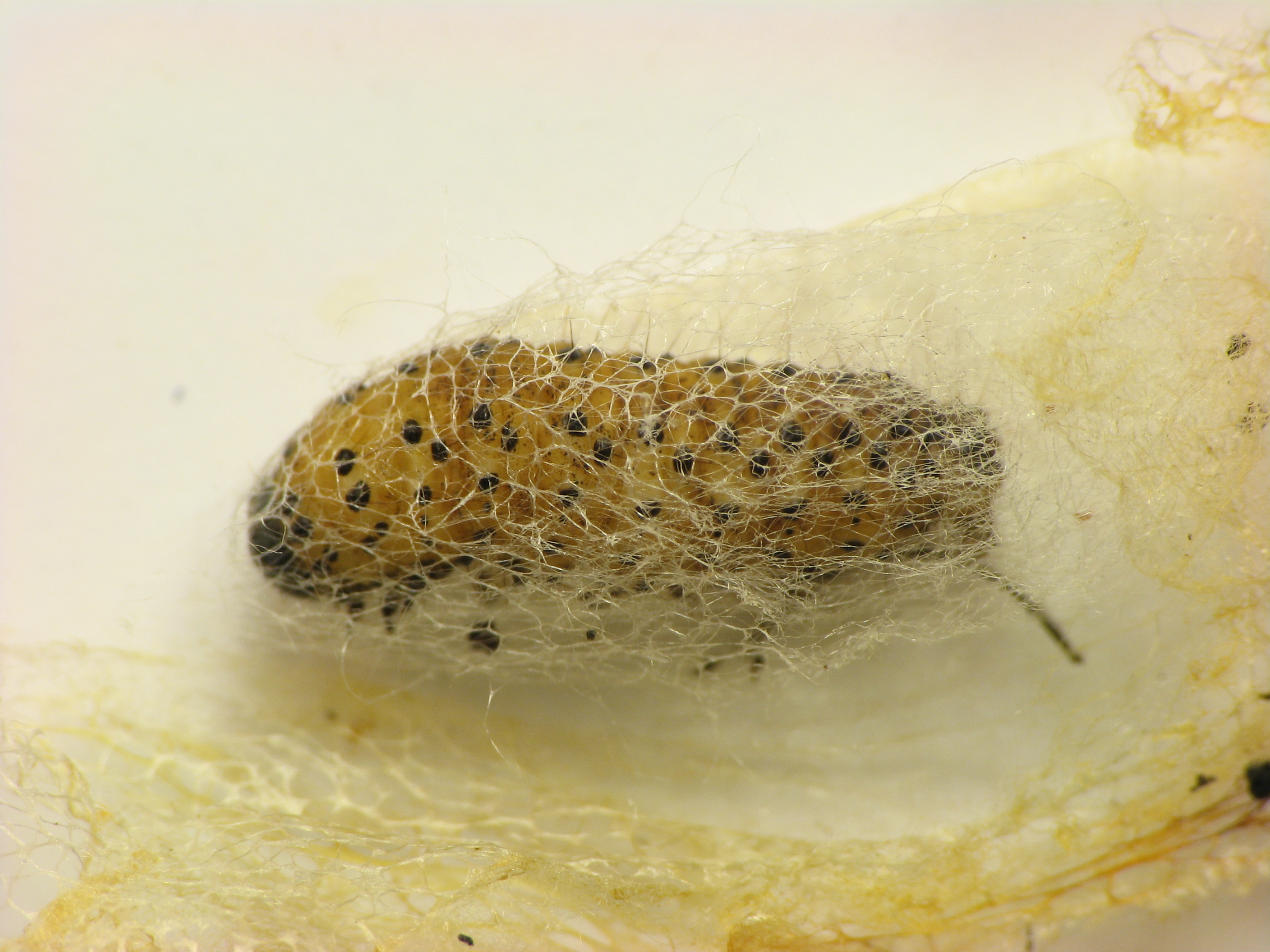
Prepupa building cocoon

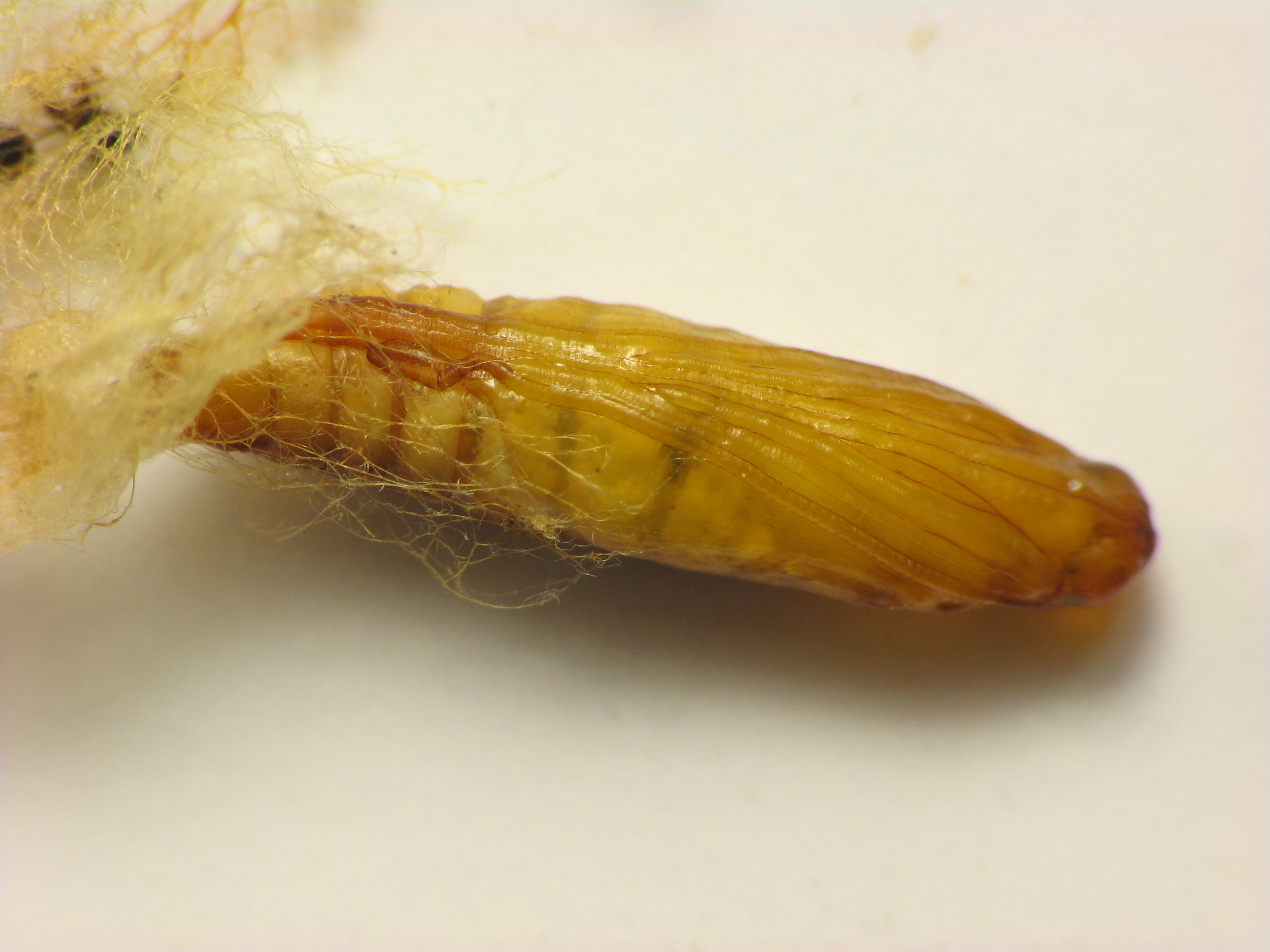
Pupa

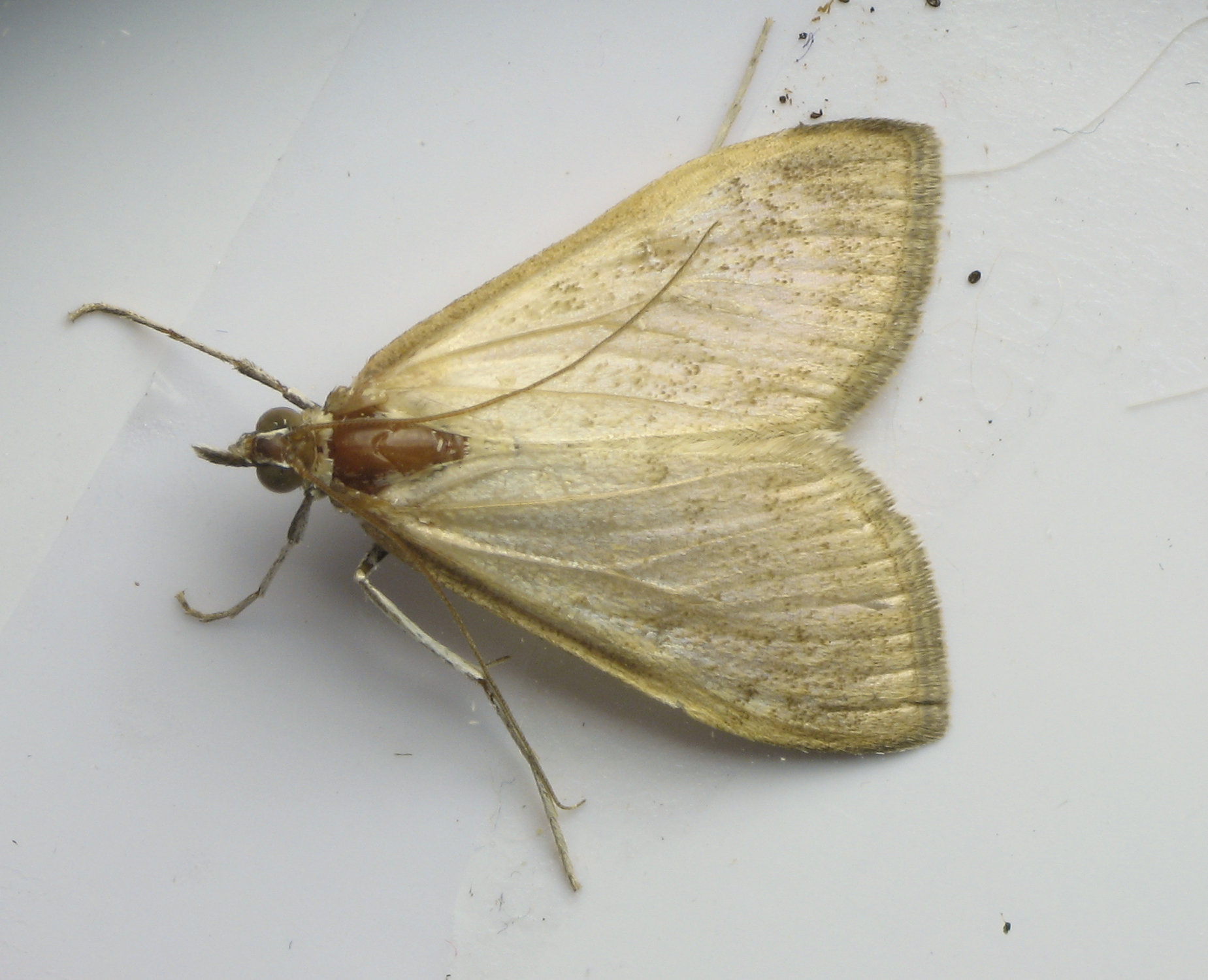
Adult

== Pyraustinae taxonomy ==
Pyraustinae currently comprise 171 genera:

- Acellalis Pagenstecher, 1884
- Achyra Guenée, 1849 (= Achiria Sherborn, 1932, Achyria Sherborn, 1932, Dosara Walker, 1859, Eurycreon Lederer, 1863, Tritaea Meyrick, 1884)
- Adoxobotys Munroe, 1978
- Aeolosma Meyrick, 1938
- Aglaops Warren, 1892 (= Xanthopsamma Munroe & Mutuura, 1968)
- Anamalaia Munroe & Mutuura, 1969
- Anania Hübner, 1823 (= Algedonia Lederer, 1863, Mutuuraia Munroe, 1976, Nealgedonia Munroe, 1976, Ametasia M. O. Martin, 1986, Ebulea Doubleday, 1849, Ennychia Treitschke, 1828, Ennichia Duponchel, 1833, Ethiobotys Maes, 1997, Eurrhypara Hübner, 1825, Palpita Hübner, 1806, Proteurrhypara Munroe & Mutuura, 1969, Opsibotys Warren, 1890, Perinephela Hübner, 1825, Perinephele Hübner, 1826, Perinephila Hampson, 1897, Phlyctaenia Hübner, 1825, Polyctaenia Hübner, 1826, Pronomis Munroe & Mutuura, 1968, Tenerobotys Munroe & Mutuura, 1971, Trichovalva Amsel, 1956, Udonomeiga Mutuura, 1954)
- Ancyloptila Meyrick, 1889
- Aplectropus Hampson in Walsingham & Hampson, 1896
- Aponia Munroe, 1964
- Arenochroa Munroe, 1976
- Arunamalaia Rose & Kirti, 1987
- Asphadastis Meyrick, 1934
- Atomoclostis Meyrick, 1934
- Aulacoptera Hampson, 1896 (= Aulacophora Swinhoe, 1895; preoccupied by Aulacophora Dejean, 1835)
- Aurorobotys Munroe & Mutuura, 1971
- Authaeretis Meyrick, 1886 (= Anthaeretis Carus, 1887)
- Auxolophotis Meyrick, 1933
- Betousa Walker, 1865 (= Neothyris Warren, 1899)
- Burathema Walker, 1863
- Calamochrous Lederer, 1863 (= Calamochrosta Lederer, 1863)
- Callibotys Munroe & Mutuura, 1969
- Carminibotys Munroe & Mutuura, 1971
- Catapsephis Hampson, 1899
- Ceuthobotys Munroe, 1978
- Cheloterma Meyrick, 1933
- Chilochroma Amsel, 1956
- Chilocorsia Munroe, 1964
- Chilopionea Munroe, 1964
- Chobera Moore, 1888 (= Thliptoceras Warren in Swinhoe, 1890, Mimocomma Warren, 1895, Parudea Swinhoe, 1900, Polychorista Warren, 1896)
- Circobotys Butler, 1879
- Clatrodes Marion & Viette, 1953
- Coelobathra Turner, 1908
- Coptobasoides Janse, 1935
- Crocidophora Lederer, 1863 (= Crocidosema Lederer, 1863, Monocrocis Warren, 1895)
- Crypsiptya Meyrick, 1894 (= Coclebotys Munroe & Mutuura, 1969)
- Cryptosara E. L. Martin, 1956
- Cybalobotys Maes, 2001
- Cyclarcha Swinhoe, 1894
- Daunabotys Maes, 2004
- Decelia Snellen, 1880
- Deltobotys Munroe, 1964
- Demobotys Munroe & Mutuura, 1969
- Drachma Bryk, 1913
- Duzulla Amsel, 1952
- Ecpyrrhorrhoe Hübner, 1825 (= Ecpyrrhorrhoa J. L. R. Agassiz, 1846, Ecpyrrhorrhoea Hübner, 1826, Harpadispar Agenjo, 1952, Pyraustegia Marion, 1963, Yezobotys Munroe & Mutuura, 1969)
- Elosita Snellen, 1899
- Emphylica Turner, 1913
- Endographis Meyrick, 1894
- Endotrichella Collins, 1962 (= Endotrichodes Hampson, 1919)
- Enyocera Snellen, 1880
- Epicorsia Hübner, 1818 (= Episcorsia Hübner, 1826)
- Epiecia Walker, 1866
- Epiparbattia Caradja, 1925
- Eretmopteryx Saalmüller, 1884
- Erinothus Hampson, 1899
- Euclasta Lederer, 1855 (= Ilurgia Walker, 1859, Proteuclasta Munroe, 1958)
- Eumaragma Meyrick, 1933
- Eumorphobotys Munroe & Mutuura, 1969
- Euphyciodes Marion, 1954
- Exeristis Meyrick, 1886
- Fumibotys Munroe, 1976
- Glyphidomarptis Meyrick, 1936
- Gnamptorhiza Warren, 1896
- Gynenomis Munroe & Mutuura, 1968
- Gyptitia Snellen, 1883
- Hahncappsia Munroe, 1976
- Haplochytis Meyrick, 1933
- Helvibotys Munroe, 1976
- Herpetobotys Maes, 2001
- Hutuna Whalley, 1962
- Hyalobathra Meyrick, 1885 (= Leucocraspeda Warren, 1890)
- Hyalorista Warren, 1892 (= Pyraustopsis Amsel, 1956)
- Hyphercyna Sauber, 1899
- Idiusia Warren, 1896
- Ischnoscopa Meyrick, 1894
- Isocentris Meyrick, 1887
- Lampridia Snellen, 1880
- Lamprophaia Caradja, 1925
- Lepidoplaga Warren, 1895
- Leptosophista Meyrick, 1938
- Limbobotys Munroe & Mutuura, 1970
- Lirabotys J. C. Shaffer & Munroe, 2007
- Lotanga Moore, 1886
- Loxoneptera Hampson, 1896
- Loxostege Hübner, 1825 (= Boreophila Duponchel, 1845, Cosmocreon Warren, 1892, Leimonia Hübner, 1825, Limonia J. L. R. Agassiz, 1847, Margaritia Stephens, 1827, Parasitochroa Hannemann, 1964, Maroa Barnes & McDunnough, 1914, Meridiophila Marion, 1963, Polingia Barnes & McDunnough, 1914)
- Lumenia de Joannis, 1929
- Mabra Moore, 1885 (= Neurophruda Warren, 1896, Neophruda Hampson, 1897, Streptobela Turner, 1937)
- Macrospectrodes Warren, 1896
- Megatarsodes Marion, 1954
- Metaprotus Hampson, 1899
- Metasiodes Meyrick, 1894
- Mimasarta Ragonot, 1894
- Monocoptopera Hampson, 1899
- Monodonta Kenrick, 1907
- Munroeodes Amsel, 1957 (= Munroeia Amsel, 1954)
- Nacoleiopsis Matsumura, 1925
- Nascia J. Curtis, 1835
- Neadeloides Klima, 1939 (= Adeloides Warren, 1892)
- Neoepicorsia Munroe, 1964
- Neohelvibotys Munroe, 1976
- Nephelobotys Munroe & Mutuura, 1970
- Nephelolychnis Meyrick, 1933
- Niphostola Hampson, 1896
- Nomis Motschulsky, 1861
- Nymphulosis Amsel, 1959
- Oenobotys Munroe, 1976
- Oligocentris Hampson, 1896
- Oronomis Munroe & Mutuura, 1968
- Ostrinia Hübner, 1825 (= Eupolemarcha Meyrick, 1937, Micractis Warren, 1892, Zeaphagus Agenjo, 1952)
- Pagyda Walker, 1859
- Palepicorsia Maes, 1995
- Paliga Moore, 1886 (= Eutectona Wang & Sung, 1980)
- Paracentristis Meyrick, 1934
- Paracorsia Marion, 1959
- Paranomis Munroe & Mutuura, 1968
- Paratalanta Meyrick, 1890 (= Microstega Meyrick, 1890)
- Parbattia Moore, 1888
- Paschiodes Hampson, 1913
- Patissodes Hampson, 1919
- Peribona Snellen, 1895 (= Radiorista Warren, 1896)
- Perispasta Zeller, 1875
- Pimelephila Tams, 1930
- Pioneabathra J. C. Shaffer & Munroe, 2007
- Placosaris Meyrick, 1897 (= Xanthelectris Meyrick, 1938)
- Platytesis Hampson, 1919
- Portentomorpha Amsel, 1956 (= Apoecetes Munroe, 1956)
- Powysia Maes, 2006
- Preneopogon Warren, 1896
- Proconica Hampson, 1899
- Prodasycnemis Warren, 1892
- Prodelophanes Meyrick, 1937
- Prooedema Hampson, 1896
- Protepicorsia Munroe, 1964
- Protinopalpa Strand, 1911
- Protinopalpella Strand, 1911
- Prototyla Meyrick, 1933
- Psammotis Hübner, 1825 (= Lemia Duponchel, 1845, Lemiodes Guenée, 1854, Psamotis Hübner, 1825)
- Pseudepicorsia Munroe, 1964
- Pseudognathobotys Maes, 2001
- Pseudopagyda Slamka, 2013
- Pseudopolygrammodes Munroe & Mutuura, 1969
- Pseudopyrausta Amsel, 1956
- Ptiladarcha Meyrick, 1933
- Pyralausta Hampson, 1913
- Pyrasia M. O. Martin, 1986
- Pyrausta Schrank, 1802 (= Aplographe Warren, 1892, Autocosmia Warren, 1892, Botys Latreille, 1802, Botis Swainson, [1821], Ostreophena Sodoffsky, 1837, Ostreophana Sodoffsky, 1837, Botis J. L. R. Agassiz, 1847, Heliaca Hübner, 1806, Cindaphia Lederer, 1863, Haematia Hübner, 1818, Heliaca Hübner, 1822, Heliaca Hübner, 1818, Heliaca Hübner, 1808, Herbula Guenée, 1854, Hyaloscia Dognin, 1908, Mardinia Amsel, 1952, Panstegia Hübner, 1825, Perilypa Hübner, 1825, Porphyritis Hübner, 1825, Proteroeca Meyrick, 1884, Pyrausta Hübner, 1825, Anthocrypta Warren, 1892, Pyraustes Billberg, 1820, Sciorista Warren, 1890, Rattana Rose & Pajni, 1979, Syllythria Hübner, 1825, Rhodaria Guenée, 1845, Synchromia Guenée, 1854, Tholeria Hübner, 1823, Trigonuncus Amsel, 1952)
- Pyraustimorpha Kocak & Seven, 1995
- Pyraustomorpha Maes, 2014
- Rodaba Moore, 1888
- Sarabotys Munroe, 1964
- Saucrobotys Munroe, 1976
- Scirpobotys Seizmair, 2021
- Sclerocona Meyrick, 1890
- Semniomima Warren, 1892
- Sericoplaga Warren, 1892
- Sinibotys Munroe & Mutuura, 1969
- Sitochroa Hübner, 1825 (= Spilodes Guenée, 1849)
- Spinoscuncus Chen, Zhang & Li, 2018
- Stenochora Warren, 1892
- Tetridia Warren, 1890
- Thivolleo Maes, 2006
- Thysanodesma Butler, 1889
- Tipuliforma Kenrick, 1907
- Tirsa J. F. G. Clarke, 1971
- Togabotys Yamanaka, 1978
- Torulisquama Zhang & Li, 2010
- Toxobotys Munroe & Mutuura, 1968
- Trigamozeucta Meyrick, 1937
- Triuncidia Munroe, 1976
- Uresiphita Hübner, 1825 (= Mecyna Guenée, 1854, Uresiphoeta J. L. R. Agassiz, 1847)
- Vittabotys Munroe & Mutuura, 1970
- Xanthostege Munroe, 1976
- Yezobotys Munroe & Mutuura, 1969

== See also ==
- List of crambid genera
