= Niphadoses dengcaolites =

Scientific classification
- Kingdom: Animalia
- Phylum: Arthropoda
- Clade: Pancrustacea
- Class: Insecta
- Order: Lepidoptera
- Family: Crambidae
- Genus: Niphadoses
- Species: N. dengcaolites

Binomial name
- Niphadoses dengcaolites Wang & Sung, 1978

Species of moth

Niphadoses dengcaolites is a moth in the family Crambidae. It was described by Wang and Sung in 1978. It is found in China (Jiangsu, Hubei, Jiangxi, Hunan, Sichuan).
