= Patissa burmanalis =

Scientific classification
- Domain: Eukaryota
- Kingdom: Animalia
- Phylum: Arthropoda
- Class: Insecta
- Order: Lepidoptera
- Family: Crambidae
- Genus: Patissa
- Species: P. burmanalis

Binomial name
- Patissa burmanalis (C. Swinhoe, 1890)

Synonyms
- Eurycraspeda burmanalis C. Swinhoe, 1890

Species of moth

Patissa burmanalis is a moth in the family Crambidae. It was described by Charles Swinhoe in 1890. It is found in Myanmar.
