= Niphadoses =

Scientific classification
- Kingdom: Animalia
- Phylum: Arthropoda
- Class: Insecta
- Order: Lepidoptera
- Family: Crambidae
- Subfamily: Schoenobiinae
- Genus: Niphadoses; Common, 1960

Genus of moths

Niphadoses is a genus of moths of the family Crambidae.

== Species ==
- Niphadoses chionotus (Meyrick, 1889)
- Niphadoses dengcaolites Wang & Sung, 1978
- Niphadoses elachia Common, 1960
- Niphadoses hoplites Common, 1960
- Niphadoses palleucus Common, 1960
