= Helonastes acentrus =

Scientific classification
- Domain: Eukaryota
- Kingdom: Animalia
- Phylum: Arthropoda
- Class: Insecta
- Order: Lepidoptera
- Family: Crambidae
- Genus: Helonastes
- Species: H. acentrus

Binomial name
- Helonastes acentrus Common, 1960

Species of moth

Helonastes acentrus is a moth in the family Crambidae. It was described by Ian Francis Bell Common in 1960. It is found in Australia, where it has been recorded from Queensland.

The larvae possibly feed on Eleocharis species.
