= Ramila acciusalis =

Scientific classification
- Kingdom: Animalia
- Phylum: Arthropoda
- Class: Insecta
- Order: Lepidoptera
- Family: Crambidae
- Genus: Ramila
- Species: R. acciusalis

Binomial name
- Ramila acciusalis (Walker, 1859)

Synonyms
- Margaronia acciusalis Walker, 1859

Species of moth

Ramila acciusalis is a moth in the family Crambidae. It was described by Francis Walker in 1859. It is found in China (Jiangxi, Fujian, Hainan, Yunnan, Xizang), India, Sri Lanka and on Borneo.

== Description ==
The wingspan is 26 mm. Membrane of the forewings non-crenulate, where the costal fascia more orange. Line are also orange. The medial line arising from the spot at middle of cell. A single discocellular lunule can be seen. Postmedial line excurved to outer angle. The marginal line more maculate (spotted).
