= Brihaspa chrysostomus =

Scientific classification
- Kingdom: Animalia
- Phylum: Arthropoda
- Clade: Pancrustacea
- Class: Insecta
- Order: Lepidoptera
- Family: Crambidae
- Genus: Brihaspa
- Species: B. chrysostomus

Binomial name
- Brihaspa chrysostomus (Zeller, 1852)

Synonyms
- Schoenobius chrysostomus Zeller, 1852

Species of moth

Brihaspa chrysostomus is a moth in the family Crambidae. It was described by Zeller in 1852. It is found in Kenya, South Africa and Zambia.
