= Patissa coenicosta =

Scientific classification
- Domain: Eukaryota
- Kingdom: Animalia
- Phylum: Arthropoda
- Class: Insecta
- Order: Lepidoptera
- Family: Crambidae
- Genus: Patissa
- Species: P. coenicosta

Binomial name
- Patissa coenicosta de Joannis, 1930

Synonyms
- Brihaspa atrostigmella sinensis Caradja in Caradja & Meyrick, 1933

Species of moth

Patissa coenicosta is a moth in the family Crambidae. It was described by Joseph de Joannis in 1930. It is found in China (Guangdong) and Vietnam.

== Subspecies ==
- Patissa coenicosta coenicosta (Vietnam)
- Patissa coenicosta sinensis (Caradja in Caradja & Meyrick, 1933) (China)
