= Niphadoses palleucus =

Scientific classification
- Kingdom: Animalia
- Phylum: Arthropoda
- Class: Insecta
- Order: Lepidoptera
- Family: Crambidae
- Genus: Niphadoses
- Species: N. palleucus

Binomial name
- Niphadoses palleucus Common, 1960

Species of moth

Niphadoses palleucus is a moth in the family Crambidae. It was described by Ian Francis Bell Common in 1960. It is found in north-western Australia.

Larvae have been recorded on cultivated rice.
