= Patissa erythrozonalis =

Scientific classification
- Kingdom: Animalia
- Phylum: Arthropoda
- Class: Insecta
- Order: Lepidoptera
- Family: Crambidae
- Genus: Patissa
- Species: P. erythrozonalis

Binomial name
- Patissa erythrozonalis Hampson, 1896

Species of moth

Patissa erythrozonalis is a moth in the family Crambidae. It was described by George Hampson in 1896. It is found in India (Punjab, Nilgiris) and Sri Lanka.

The wingspan is about 14 mm. The forewings are pure white with a ferruginous band from the upper angle of the cell to the inner margin. There are three ferruginous specks below the costa and a marginal series of specks.
