= Proschoenobius forsteri =

Scientific classification
- Kingdom: Animalia
- Phylum: Arthropoda
- Class: Insecta
- Order: Lepidoptera
- Family: Crambidae
- Genus: Proschoenobius
- Species: P. forsteri

Binomial name
- Proschoenobius forsteri Munroe, 1974

Species of moth

Proschoenobius forsteri is a moth in the family Crambidae. It was described by Eugene G. Munroe in 1974. It is found in Bolivia.
