= Leucargyra puralis =

Scientific classification
- Kingdom: Animalia
- Phylum: Arthropoda
- Class: Insecta
- Order: Lepidoptera
- Family: Crambidae
- Genus: Leucargyra
- Species: L. puralis

Binomial name
- Leucargyra puralis Hampson, 1896

Species of moth

Leucargyra puralis is a moth in the family Crambidae. It was described by George Hampson in 1896. It is found in Brazil.

The wingspan is about 60 mm. The forewings are silvery white.

The larvae have been recorded feeding inside grasses.
