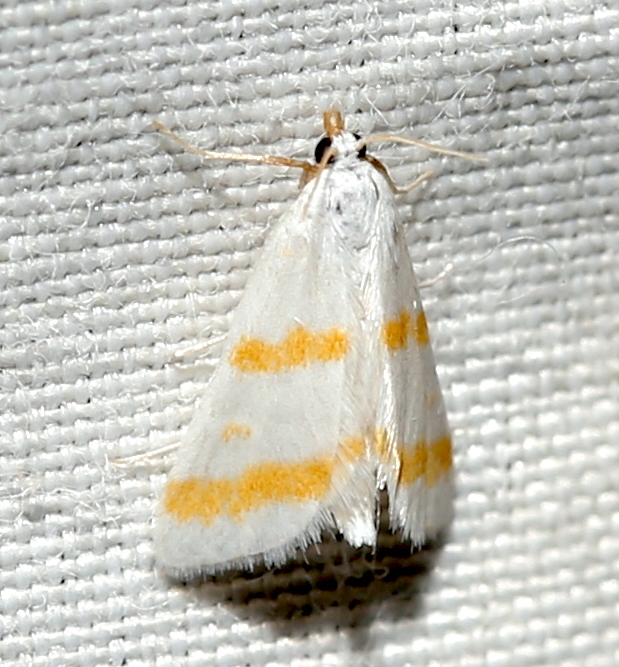

Scientific classification
- Kingdom: Animalia
- Phylum: Arthropoda
- Class: Insecta
- Order: Lepidoptera
- Family: Crambidae
- Genus: Leptosteges
- Species: L. xantholeucalis

Binomial name
- Leptosteges xantholeucalis (Guenée, 1854)

Synonyms
- Parthenodes xantholeucalis Guenée, 1854; Patissa xantholeucalis; Scirpophaga fasciella Fernald, 1887

= Leptosteges xantholeucalis =

Species of moth

Leptosteges xantholeucalis is a moth in the family Crambidae. It was described by Achille Guenée in 1854. It is found in North America, where it has been recorded from Florida, Mississippi and North Carolina. It is also found in Cuba.

The wingspan is about 13 mm. Adults have been recorded on wing in March, from May to September and in November.
