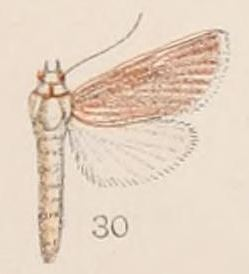
- Patissa intersticalis

Scientific classification
- Domain: Eukaryota
- Kingdom: Animalia
- Phylum: Arthropoda
- Class: Insecta
- Order: Lepidoptera
- Family: Crambidae
- Subfamily: Schoenobiinae
- Genus: Patissa; Moore, 1886

Synonyms
- Eurycraspeda Warren in Swinhoe, 1890

= Patissa =

Genus of moths

Patissa is a genus of moths of the family Crambidae erected by Frederic Moore in 1886.

== Species ==
- Patissa aenealis Hampson, 1899
- Patissa atricostalis Hampson, 1919
- Patissa atrilinealis Hampson, 1919
- Patissa burmanalis (C. Swinhoe, 1890)
- Patissa coenicosta de Joannis, 1930
- Patissa curvilinealis Hampson, 1896
- Patissa erythrozonalis Hampson, 1896
- Patissa fractilinealis Hampson, 1919
- Patissa fulvicepsalis Hampson, 1919
- Patissa fulvidorsalis Hampson, 1903
- Patissa fulvipunctalis Hampson, 1919
- Patissa fulvosparsa Butler, 1881
- Patissa geminalis Hampson, 1919
- Patissa heldi E. Hering, 1903
- Patissa interfuscalis Hampson, 1899
- Patissa intersticalis Hampson, 1908
- Patissa lactealis (C. Felder, R. Felder & Rogenhofer, 1875)
- Patissa latifuscalis Hampson, 1896
- Patissa melitopis (Meyrick, 1933)
- Patissa minima Inoue, 1995
- Patissa monostidzalis Hampson, 1919
- Patissa nigropunctata (Wileman & South, 1918)
- Patissa ochreipalpalis Hampson, 1919
- Patissa ochroalis Hampson, 1919
- Patissa pentamita (Turner, 1911)
- Patissa percnopis (Meyrick, 1933)
- Patissa pulverea (Hampson, 1919)
- Patissa punctum de Joannis, 1930
- Patissa rubrilinealis Hampson, 1919
- Patissa rufitinctalis Hampson, 1919
- Patissa stenopteralis Hampson, 1919
- Patissa taiwanalis (Shibuya, 1928)
- Patissa tenuousa Chen, Song & Wu, 2007
- Patissa termipunctalis (Hampson, 1919)
- Patissa tinctalis (Hampson, 1919)
- Patissa tonkinialis Caradja, 1926
- Patissa vagilinealis Hampson, 1908
- Patissa virginea Zeller, 1863
- Patissa xanthoperas (Hampson, 1896)
