= Leptosteges decetialis =

Scientific classification
- Domain: Eukaryota
- Kingdom: Animalia
- Phylum: Arthropoda
- Class: Insecta
- Order: Lepidoptera
- Family: Crambidae
- Genus: Leptosteges
- Species: L. decetialis

Binomial name
- Leptosteges decetialis (H. Druce, 1896)

Synonyms
- Hydrocampa decetialis H. Druce, 1896

Species of moth

Leptosteges decetialis is a moth in the family Crambidae. It was described by Herbert Druce in 1896. It is found in Tabasco, Mexico.
