= Patissa taiwanalis =

Scientific classification
- Domain: Eukaryota
- Kingdom: Animalia
- Phylum: Arthropoda
- Class: Insecta
- Order: Lepidoptera
- Family: Crambidae
- Genus: Patissa
- Species: P. taiwanalis

Binomial name
- Patissa taiwanalis (Shibuya, 1928)

Synonyms
- Eurycraspeda taiwanalis Shibuya, 1928

Species of moth

Patissa taiwanalis is a moth in the family Crambidae. It was described by Shibuya in 1928. It is found in Taiwan.
