= Catagela adjurella =

Scientific classification
- Kingdom: Animalia
- Phylum: Arthropoda
- Class: Insecta
- Order: Lepidoptera
- Family: Crambidae
- Genus: Catagela
- Species: C. adjurella

Binomial name
- Catagela adjurella Walker, 1863

Species of moth

Catagela adjurella is a moth in the family Crambidae. It was described by Francis Walker in 1863. It is found in Sri Lanka, India and China (Shandong, Henan, Jiangsu, Anhui, Zhejiang, Hubei, Hunan, Guangdong, Hainan, Yunnan).
