= Archischoenobius pallidalis =

Scientific classification
- Kingdom: Animalia
- Phylum: Arthropoda
- Class: Insecta
- Order: Lepidoptera
- Family: Crambidae
- Genus: Archischoenobius
- Species: A. pallidalis

Binomial name
- Archischoenobius pallidalis (South in Leech & South, 1901)

Synonyms
- Parthenodes pallidalis South in Leech & South, 1901

Species of moth

Archischoenobius pallidalis is a moth in the family Crambidae. It was described by South in 1901. It is found in China (Hubei, Fujian, Guangxi, Sichuan, Yunnan).
