= Cyclocausta =

Scientific classification
- Kingdom: Animalia
- Phylum: Arthropoda
- Class: Insecta
- Order: Lepidoptera
- Family: Crambidae
- Subfamily: Schoenobiinae
- Genus: Cyclocausta; Warren, 1889
- Species: C. trilineata

Binomial name
- Cyclocausta trilineata Warren, 1889

Genus of moths

Cyclocausta is a genus of moths of the family Crambidae. It contains only one species, Cyclocausta trilineata, which is found in Brazil, where it has been recorded from the Amazons.

The wingspan is about 18 mm. The forewings are white with a dark brown costal streak. The hind margin and two parallel lines are brown. The hindwings are also white.
