= Ramila angustifimbrialis =

Scientific classification
- Domain: Eukaryota
- Kingdom: Animalia
- Phylum: Arthropoda
- Class: Insecta
- Order: Lepidoptera
- Family: Crambidae
- Genus: Ramila
- Species: R. angustifimbrialis

Binomial name
- Ramila angustifimbrialis (Warren in Swinhoe, 1890)

Synonyms
- Crambostenia angustifimbrialis Warren in Swinhoe, 1890; Ramila angustifimbrialis Warren, 1892

Species of moth

Ramila angustifimbrialis is a moth in the family Crambidae. It was described by William Warren in 1890. It is found in Taiwan, India, Nepal, Bhutan, Myanmar and Thailand.

Adults are silvery white with a fulvous costa of the forewings.
