= Leptosteges flavifascialis =

Scientific classification
- Domain: Eukaryota
- Kingdom: Animalia
- Phylum: Arthropoda
- Class: Insecta
- Order: Lepidoptera
- Family: Crambidae
- Genus: Leptosteges
- Species: L. flavifascialis

Binomial name
- Leptosteges flavifascialis (Barnes & McDunnough, 1913)

Synonyms
- Patissa flavifascialis Barnes & McDunnough, 1913

Species of moth

Leptosteges flavifascialis is a moth in the family Crambidae. It was described by William Barnes and James Halliday McDunnough in 1913. It is found in North America, where it has been recorded from South Carolina to Georgia south into Florida.

Adults are on wing nearly year round.
