= Proschoenobius subcervinellus =

Scientific classification
- Kingdom: Animalia
- Phylum: Arthropoda
- Class: Insecta
- Order: Lepidoptera
- Family: Crambidae
- Genus: Proschoenobius
- Species: P. subcervinellus

Binomial name
- Proschoenobius subcervinellus (Walker, 1863)

Synonyms
- Chilo subcervinellus Walker, 1863

Species of moth

Proschoenobius subcervinellus is a moth in the family Crambidae. It was described by Francis Walker in 1863. It is found in Honduras.
