= Ramila minima =

Scientific classification
- Kingdom: Animalia
- Phylum: Arthropoda
- Clade: Pancrustacea
- Class: Insecta
- Order: Lepidoptera
- Family: Crambidae
- Genus: Ramila
- Species: R. minima

Binomial name
- Ramila minima Chen & Wu, 2014

Species of moth

Ramila minima is a moth in the family Crambidae. It was described by Fu-Qiang Chen and Chun-Sheng Wu in 2014. It is found in China (Shandong) and Vietnam.

The wingspan is 15–16 mm.
