= Patissa aenealis =

Scientific classification
- Domain: Eukaryota
- Kingdom: Animalia
- Phylum: Arthropoda
- Class: Insecta
- Order: Lepidoptera
- Family: Crambidae
- Genus: Patissa
- Species: P. aenealis

Binomial name
- Patissa aenealis Hampson, 1899

Species of moth

Patissa aenealis is a moth in the family Crambidae. It was described by George Hampson in 1899. It is found in Sri Lanka.
