= Leptosteges nigricostella =

Scientific classification
- Kingdom: Animalia
- Phylum: Arthropoda
- Class: Insecta
- Order: Lepidoptera
- Family: Crambidae
- Genus: Leptosteges
- Species: L. nigricostella

Binomial name
- Leptosteges nigricostella (Hampson, 1895)

Synonyms
- Brihaspa nigricostella Hampson, 1895

Species of moth

Leptosteges nigricostella is a moth in the family Crambidae. It was described by George Hampson in 1895. It is found in Paraná, Brazil.
