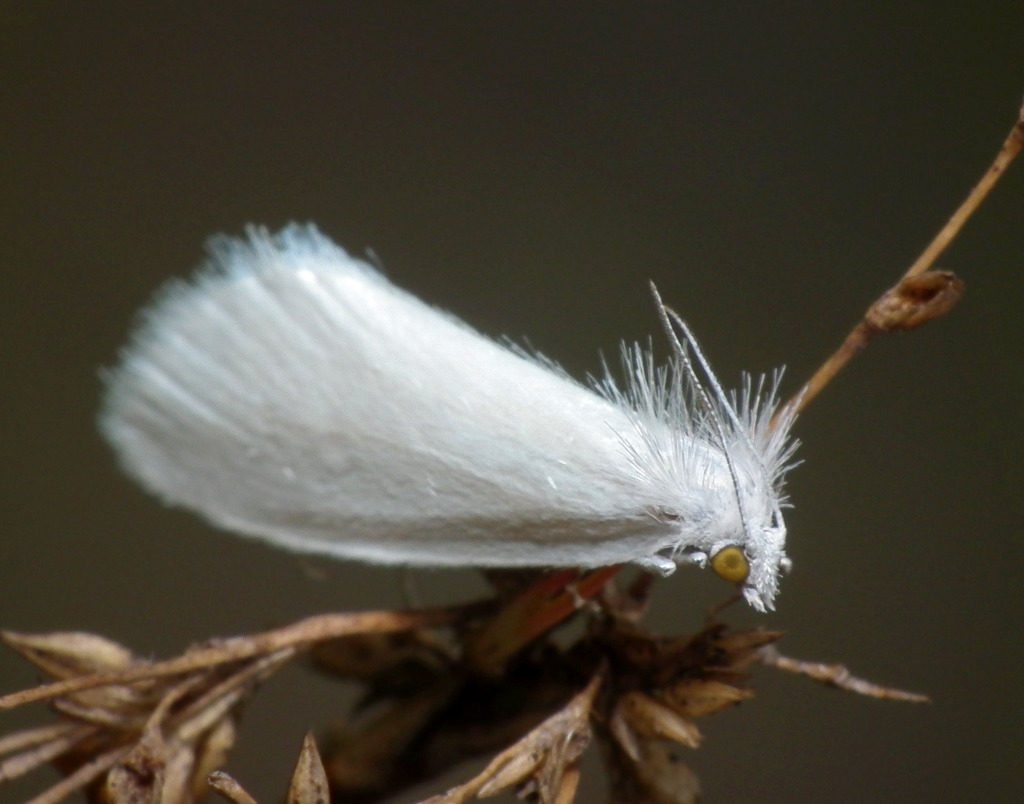
- Tipanaea patulella

Scientific classification
- Kingdom: Animalia
- Phylum: Arthropoda
- Class: Insecta
- Order: Lepidoptera
- Family: Crambidae
- Subfamily: Schoenobiinae
- Genus: Tipanaea; Walker, 1863

= Tipanaea =

Genus of moths

Tipanaea is a genus of moths of the family Crambidae.

== Species ==
- Tipanaea intactella Walker, 1863
- Tipanaea patulella Walker, 1863
