= Stenocalama =

Scientific classification
- Kingdom: Animalia
- Phylum: Arthropoda
- Clade: Pancrustacea
- Class: Insecta
- Order: Lepidoptera
- Family: Crambidae
- Subfamily: Schoenobiinae
- Genus: Stenocalama; Hampson, 1919
- Species: S. ochrotis

Binomial name
- Stenocalama ochrotis Hampson, 1919

Genus of moths

Stenocalama is a monotypic moth genus of the family Crambidae described by George Hampson in 1919. Its only species, Stenocalama ochrotis, described by the same author in the same year, is found in Uganda.

The wingspan is about 16 mm. The forewings are whitish, suffused with rufous. The hindwings are white, the costal area tinged with rufous.
