= Leucargyra =

Scientific classification
- Kingdom: Animalia
- Phylum: Arthropoda
- Class: Insecta
- Order: Lepidoptera
- Family: Crambidae
- Subfamily: Schoenobiinae
- Genus: Leucargyra; Hampson, 1896

Genus of moths

Leucargyra is a genus of moths of the family Crambidae.

== Species ==
- Leucargyra puralis Hampson, 1896
- Leucargyra xanthoceps Hampson, 1919
