= Adelpherupa aethiopicalis =

Scientific classification
- Kingdom: Animalia
- Phylum: Arthropoda
- Clade: Pancrustacea
- Class: Insecta
- Order: Lepidoptera
- Family: Crambidae
- Genus: Adelpherupa
- Species: A. aethiopicalis

Binomial name
- Adelpherupa aethiopicalis Maes, 2002

Species of moth

Adelpherupa aethiopicalis is a moth in the family Crambidae. It was described by Koen V. N. Maes in 2002. It is found in Ethiopia.
