= Panalipa bisignatus =

Scientific classification
- Kingdom: Animalia
- Phylum: Arthropoda
- Class: Insecta
- Order: Lepidoptera
- Family: Crambidae
- Genus: Panalipa
- Species: P. bisignatus

Binomial name
- Panalipa bisignatus (C. Swinhoe, 1886)

Synonyms
- Schoenobius bisignatus C. Swinhoe, 1886

Species of moth

Panalipa bisignatus is a moth in the family Crambidae. It was described by Charles Swinhoe in 1886. It is found in India.
