= Calamoschoena stictalis =

Scientific classification
- Kingdom: Animalia
- Phylum: Arthropoda
- Class: Insecta
- Order: Lepidoptera
- Family: Crambidae
- Genus: Calamoschoena
- Species: C. stictalis

Binomial name
- Calamoschoena stictalis Hampson, 1919

Species of moth

Calamoschoena stictalis is a moth in the family Crambidae. It was described by George Hampson in 1919. It is found in Malawi, Mozambique, South Africa and Zimbabwe.
