= Patissa pentamita =

Scientific classification
- Domain: Eukaryota
- Kingdom: Animalia
- Phylum: Arthropoda
- Class: Insecta
- Order: Lepidoptera
- Family: Crambidae
- Genus: Patissa
- Species: P. pentamita

Binomial name
- Patissa pentamita (Turner, 1911)

Synonyms
- Donacaula pentamita Turner, 1911

Species of moth

Patissa pentamita is a moth in the family Crambidae. It was described by Turner in 1911. It is found in Australia, where it has been recorded from the Northern Territory.
