= Adelpherupa pontica =

Scientific classification
- Kingdom: Animalia
- Phylum: Arthropoda
- Clade: Pancrustacea
- Class: Insecta
- Order: Lepidoptera
- Family: Crambidae
- Genus: Adelpherupa
- Species: A. pontica

Binomial name
- Adelpherupa pontica Maes, 2002

Species of moth

Adelpherupa pontica is a moth in the family Crambidae. It was described by Koen V. N. Maes in 2002. It is found in Cameroon, the Democratic Republic of the Congo (Katanga), South Africa and Uganda.
