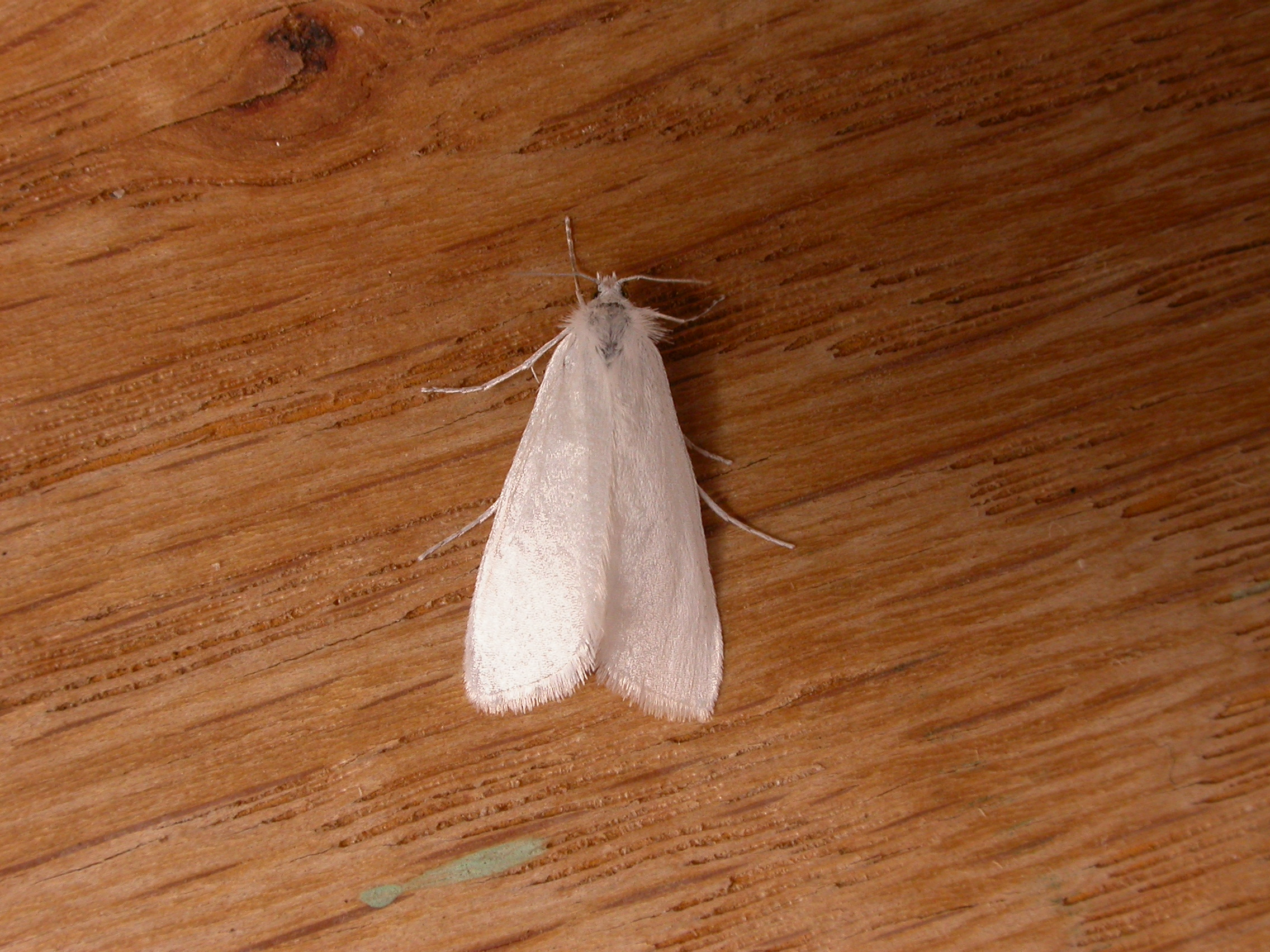

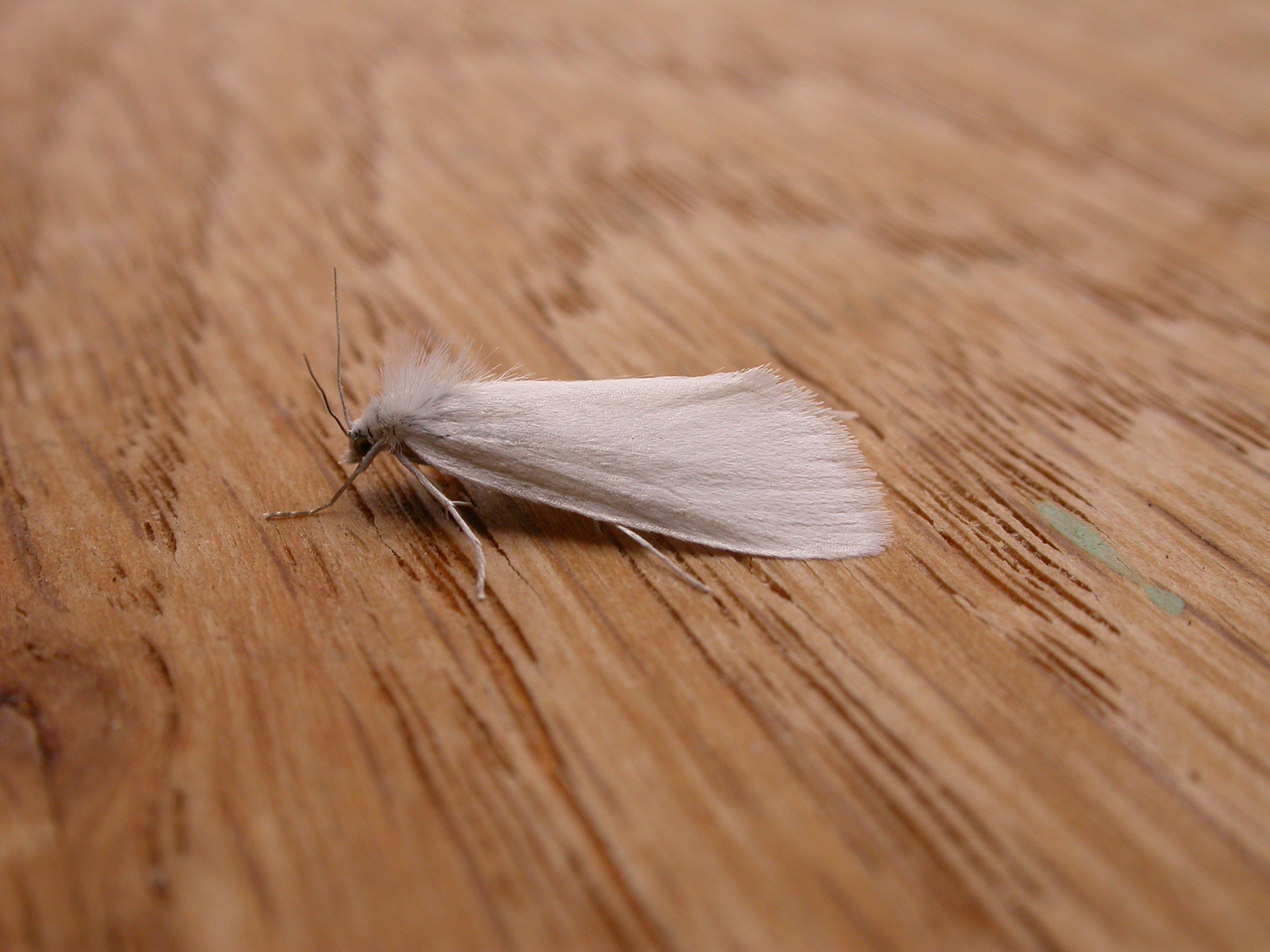

Scientific classification
- Kingdom: Animalia
- Phylum: Arthropoda
- Class: Insecta
- Order: Lepidoptera
- Family: Crambidae
- Genus: Tipanaea
- Species: T. patulella

Binomial name
- Tipanaea patulella Walker, 1863

Synonyms
- Scirpophaga exsanguis Meyrick, 1882

= Tipanaea patulella =

Species of moth

Tipanaea patulella is a moth of the family Crambidae described by Francis Walker in 1863. It is known from Australia, where it is found from Queensland to Tasmania.

The wingspan is about 30 mm. Adults are white.

The larvae are thought to bore into the stems of Juncus species.
