= Leptosteges parthenialis =

Scientific classification
- Kingdom: Animalia
- Phylum: Arthropoda
- Class: Insecta
- Order: Lepidoptera
- Family: Crambidae
- Genus: Leptosteges
- Species: L. parthenialis

Binomial name
- Leptosteges parthenialis (Dyar, 1917)

Synonyms
- Patissa parthenialis Dyar, 1917

Species of moth

Leptosteges parthenialis is a moth in the family Crambidae. It was described by Harrison Gray Dyar Jr. in 1917. It has been recorded from the US states of Florida, Louisiana and Oklahoma.

The wingspan is about 13 mm. Adults have been recorded on wing from May to August.
