= Patissa stenopteralis =

Scientific classification
- Kingdom: Animalia
- Phylum: Arthropoda
- Class: Insecta
- Order: Lepidoptera
- Family: Crambidae
- Genus: Patissa
- Species: P. stenopteralis

Binomial name
- Patissa stenopteralis Hampson, 1919

Synonyms
- Scirpophaga haplosticha Turner, 1937

Species of moth

Patissa stenopteralis is a moth in the family Crambidae. It was described by George Hampson in 1919. It is found in Australia, where it has been recorded from Queensland.

The wingspan is about 16 mm. The forewings are pure white with a pale cupreous-brown point below the costa and a patch below the cell. There is also a straight antemedial band and a dentate subterminal line.
