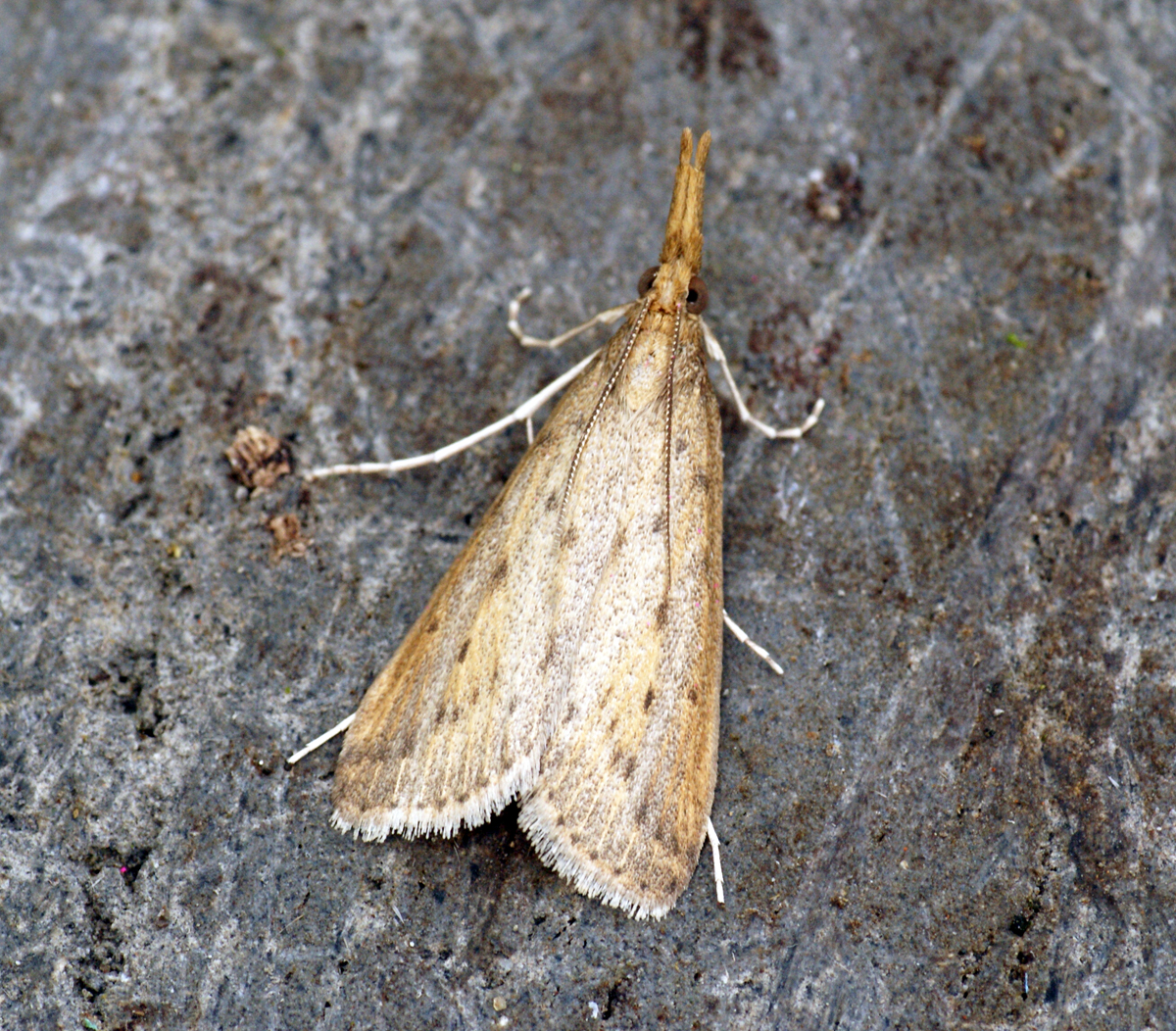
- Schoenobius gigantella male

Scientific classification
- Domain: Eukaryota
- Kingdom: Animalia
- Phylum: Arthropoda
- Class: Insecta
- Order: Lepidoptera
- Family: Crambidae
- Subfamily: Schoenobiinae; Duponchel, 1846

= Schoenobiinae =

Subfamily of moths

Schoenobiinae is a subfamily of the lepidopteran family Crambidae. The subfamily was described by Philogène Auguste Joseph Duponchel in 1846.

== Genera ==
- Adelpherupa Hampson, 1919 (= Limnopsares Meyrick, 1934, Schoenoploca Meyrick, 1933)
- Alloperissa Meyrick, 1934
- Archischoenobius Speidel, 1984
- Argyrostola Hampson, 1896
- Brihaspa Moore, 1868
- Calamoschoena Poulton, 1916 (= Eurycerota Janse, 1917)
- Carectocultus A. Blanchard, 1975
- Catagela Walker, 1863
- Chionobosca Turner, 1911
- Cyclocausta Warren, 1889
- Dejoannisia Vári, 2002 (= Schoenobiodes de Joannis, 1927)
- Donacaula Meyrick, 1890
- Helonastes Common, 1960
- Leechia South in Leech & South, 1901
- Leptosteges Warren, 1889
- Leucargyra Hampson, 1896
- Leucoides Hampson, 1893
- Niphadoses Common, 1960
- Panalipa Moore, 1866 (= Microschoenis Meyrick, 1887)
- Patissa Moore, 1886 (= Eurycraspeda Warren in Swinhoe, 1890)
- Promacrochilo Błeszyński, 1962 (= Macrochilo Hampson, 1896)
- Proschoenobius Munroe, 1974
- Ramila Moore, 1868 (= Crambostenia Warren in Swinhoe, 1890, Ramilla West, 1931)
- Rupela Walker, 1863 (= Storteria Barnes & McDunnough, 1913)
- Schoenobius Duponchel, 1836 (= Erioproctus Zeller, 1839)
- Scirpophaga Treitschke, 1832 (= Apurima Walker, 1863, Schoenophaga Duponchel, 1836, Schoinophaga Sodoffsky, 1837, Schoenophaga J. L. R. Agassiz, 1847, Spartophaga Duponchel, 1836, Tryporyza Common, 1960)
- Stenocalama Hampson, 1919
- Tipanaea Walker, 1863

== Former genera ==
- Varpa Aurivillius, 1925
