= Carectocultus =

Scientific classification
- Kingdom: Animalia
- Phylum: Arthropoda
- Class: Insecta
- Order: Lepidoptera
- Family: Crambidae
- Subfamily: Schoenobiinae
- Genus: Carectocultus; A. Blanchard, 1975

Genus of moths

Carectocultus is a genus of moths of the family Crambidae.

== Species ==
- Carectocultus bivitta Möschler, 1882
- Carectocultus dominicki A. Blanchard, 1975
- Carectocultus perstrialis (Hübner, 1831)

== Former species ==
- Carectocultus repugnatalis (Walker, 1863)
