= Patissa percnopis =

Scientific classification
- Kingdom: Animalia
- Phylum: Arthropoda
- Class: Insecta
- Order: Lepidoptera
- Family: Crambidae
- Genus: Patissa
- Species: P. percnopis

Binomial name
- Patissa percnopis (Meyrick, 1933)

Synonyms
- Scirpophaga percnopis Meyrick, 1933

Species of moth

Patissa percnopis is a moth in the family Crambidae. It was described by Edward Meyrick in 1933. It is found in the Democratic Republic of the Congo, where it has been recorded from Katanga.
