= Adelpherupa =

Scientific classification
- Kingdom: Animalia
- Phylum: Arthropoda
- Clade: Pancrustacea
- Class: Insecta
- Order: Lepidoptera
- Family: Crambidae
- Subfamily: Schoenobiinae
- Genus: Adelpherupa; Hampson, 1919

Synonyms
- Limnopsares Meyrick, 1934; Schoenoploca Meyrick, 1933; Schoenoplaca Maes, 2002

Genus of moths

Adelpherupa is a genus of moths of the family Crambidae.

== Species ==
- Adelpherupa aethiopicalis Maes, 2002
- Adelpherupa albescens Hampson, 1919
- Adelpherupa costipunctalis Maes, 2002
- Adelpherupa elongalis Maes, 2002
- Adelpherupa flavescens Hampson, 1919
- Adelpherupa lialuiensis Maes, 2002
- Adelpherupa pontica Maes, 2002
- Adelpherupa terreus (Zeller, 1877)
- Adelpherupa typicota (Meyrick, 1933)
