= Promacrochilo =

Scientific classification
- Kingdom: Animalia
- Phylum: Arthropoda
- Class: Insecta
- Order: Lepidoptera
- Family: Crambidae
- Subfamily: Schoenobiinae
- Genus: Promacrochilo; Błeszyński, 1962
- Species: P. ambiguellus

Binomial name
- Promacrochilo ambiguellus (Snellen, 1890)

Synonyms
- Macrochilo Snellen, 1890; Chilo ambiguellus Snellen, 1890; Pydna notata

Genus of moths

Promacrochilo is a genus of moths of the family Crambidae described by Stanisław Błeszyński in 1962. It contains only one species, Promacrochilo ambiguellus, described by Snellen in 1890, which is found in China (Hainan), India, Nepal, Myanmar, Thailand and Malaysia.
