= Carectocultus dominicki =

Scientific classification
- Kingdom: Animalia
- Phylum: Arthropoda
- Class: Insecta
- Order: Lepidoptera
- Family: Crambidae
- Genus: Carectocultus
- Species: C. dominicki

Binomial name
- Carectocultus dominicki A. Blanchard, 1975

Species of moth

Carectocultus dominicki is a moth in the family Crambidae. It was described by André Blanchard in 1975. It is found in North America, where it has been recorded from Florida, Maryland, Mississippi, North Carolina, South Carolina and Texas.

The wingspan is 27–32 mm. Adults are on wing from May to August.
