= Patissa ochreipalpalis =

Scientific classification
- Kingdom: Animalia
- Phylum: Arthropoda
- Class: Insecta
- Order: Lepidoptera
- Family: Crambidae
- Genus: Patissa
- Species: P. ochreipalpalis

Binomial name
- Patissa ochreipalpalis Hampson, 1919

Species of moth

Patissa ochreipalpalis is a moth in the family Crambidae. It was described by George Hampson in 1919. It is found on Mayotte off the coast of Southeast Africa.

The wingspan is about 14 mm (0.55 in). The forewings and hindwings are uniform silvery white.
