= Leptosteges fuscipunctalis =

Scientific classification
- Domain: Eukaryota
- Kingdom: Animalia
- Phylum: Arthropoda
- Class: Insecta
- Order: Lepidoptera
- Family: Crambidae
- Genus: Leptosteges
- Species: L. fuscipunctalis

Binomial name
- Leptosteges fuscipunctalis (Hampson, 1896)

Synonyms
- Patissa fuscipunctalis Hampson, 1896

Species of moth

Leptosteges fuscipunctalis is a moth in the family Crambidae described by George Hampson in 1896. It is found in Espírito Santo, Brazil.

The wingspan is about 24 mm. The forewings are pure shining white, but the costa is dusky fulvous with a dusky spot at the lower angle of the cell.
