= Patissa monostidzalis =

Scientific classification
- Kingdom: Animalia
- Phylum: Arthropoda
- Class: Insecta
- Order: Lepidoptera
- Family: Crambidae
- Genus: Patissa
- Species: P. monostidzalis

Binomial name
- Patissa monostidzalis Hampson, 1919

Species of moth

Patissa monostidzalis is a moth in the family Crambidae. It was described by George Hampson in 1919. It is found in Nigeria.

The wingspan is about 20 mm. The forewings are silvery white with a small black spot at the lower angle of the cell. The hindwings are silvery white.
