= Patissa xanthoperas =

Scientific classification
- Kingdom: Animalia
- Phylum: Arthropoda
- Class: Insecta
- Order: Lepidoptera
- Family: Crambidae
- Genus: Patissa
- Species: P. xanthoperas

Binomial name
- Patissa xanthoperas (Hampson, 1896)

Synonyms
- Scirpophaga xanthoperas Hampson, 1896; Patissa melanostigma Strand, 1910

Species of moth

Patissa xanthoperas is a moth in the family Crambidae. It was described by George Hampson in 1896. It is found on Sumatra.

The wingspan is about 30 mm. The forewings are pure white with a black spot at the upper angle of the cell, as well as an orange-yellow apex.
