= Leucargyra xanthoceps =

Scientific classification
- Kingdom: Animalia
- Phylum: Arthropoda
- Class: Insecta
- Order: Lepidoptera
- Family: Crambidae
- Genus: Leucargyra
- Species: L. xanthoceps

Binomial name
- Leucargyra xanthoceps Hampson, 1919

Species of moth

Leucargyra xanthoceps is a moth in the family Crambidae. It was described by George Hampson in 1919. It is found in Peru.

The wingspan is about 50 mm for males and 74 mm for females. The wings are uniform silvery white.
