= Leptosteges parvipunctella =

Scientific classification
- Domain: Eukaryota
- Kingdom: Animalia
- Phylum: Arthropoda
- Class: Insecta
- Order: Lepidoptera
- Family: Crambidae
- Genus: Leptosteges
- Species: L. parvipunctella

Binomial name
- Leptosteges parvipunctella (Schaus, 1913)

Synonyms
- Patissa parvipunctella Schaus, 1913

Species of moth

Leptosteges parvipunctella is a moth in the family Crambidae. It was described by Schaus in 1913. It is found in Costa Rica.
