= Argyrostola =

Scientific classification
- Kingdom: Animalia
- Phylum: Arthropoda
- Class: Insecta
- Order: Lepidoptera
- Family: Crambidae
- Subfamily: Schoenobiinae
- Genus: Argyrostola; Hampson, 1896
- Species: A. ruficostalis

Binomial name
- Argyrostola ruficostalis Hampson, 1896

Genus of moths

Argyrostola is a genus of moths of the family Crambidae described by George Hampson in 1896. It contains only one species, Argyrostola ruficostalis, which is found in Rio de Janeiro in Brazil and in Panama.

The wingspan is 32–44 mm. The forewings are silvery white, with reddish-brown costal and submarginal scales. Both wings have a prominent curved submarginal series of specks.
