= Patissa interfuscalis =

Scientific classification
- Kingdom: Animalia
- Phylum: Arthropoda
- Class: Insecta
- Order: Lepidoptera
- Family: Crambidae
- Genus: Patissa
- Species: P. interfuscalis

Binomial name
- Patissa interfuscalis Hampson, 1899

Species of moth

Patissa interfuscalis is a moth in the family Crambidae. It was described by George Hampson in 1899. It is found in Assam, India.
