= Catagela =

Scientific classification
- Domain: Eukaryota
- Kingdom: Animalia
- Phylum: Arthropoda
- Class: Insecta
- Order: Lepidoptera
- Family: Crambidae
- Subfamily: Schoenobiinae
- Genus: Catagela; Walker, 1863

Genus of moths

Catagela is a genus of moths of the family Crambidae.

== Species ==
- Catagela adjurella Walker, 1863
- Catagela adoceta Common, 1960
- Catagela subdotatella Inoue, 1982
