= Leptosteges chrysozona =

Scientific classification
- Kingdom: Animalia
- Phylum: Arthropoda
- Class: Insecta
- Order: Lepidoptera
- Family: Crambidae
- Genus: Leptosteges
- Species: L. chrysozona

Binomial name
- Leptosteges chrysozona (Dyar, 1917)

Synonyms
- Patissa chrysozona Dyar, 1917

Species of moth

Leptosteges chrysozona is a moth in the family Crambidae. It was described by Harrison Gray Dyar Jr. in 1917. It has been recorded in the United States from Oklahoma and Texas.
