= Leptosteges =

Scientific classification
- Kingdom: Animalia
- Phylum: Arthropoda
- Class: Insecta
- Order: Lepidoptera
- Family: Crambidae
- Subfamily: Schoenobiinae
- Genus: Leptosteges; Warren, 1889

Genus of moths

Leptosteges is a genus of moths of the family Crambidae.

== Species ==
- Leptosteges chrysozona (Dyar, 1917)
- Leptosteges decetialis (Druce, 1896)
- Leptosteges flavicostella (Fernald, 1887)
- Leptosteges flavifascialis (Barnes & McDunnough, 1913)
- Leptosteges fuscipunctalis
- Leptosteges nigricostella (Hampson, 1895)
- Leptosteges onirophanta
- Leptosteges parthenialis (Dyar, 1917)
- Leptosteges parvipunctella (Schaus, 1913)
- Leptosteges pulverulenta Warren, 1889
- Leptosteges semicostalis
- Leptosteges sordidalis (Barnes & McDunnough, 1913)
- Leptosteges vestaliella (Zeller, 1872)
- Leptosteges xantholeucalis (Guenée, 1854)
