= Brihaspa frontalis =

Scientific classification
- Kingdom: Animalia
- Phylum: Arthropoda
- Class: Insecta
- Order: Lepidoptera
- Family: Crambidae
- Genus: Brihaspa
- Species: B. frontalis

Binomial name
- Brihaspa frontalis (Walker, 1866)

Synonyms
- Margaronia frontalis Walker, 1866

Species of moth

Brihaspa frontalis is a moth in the family Crambidae. It was described by Francis Walker in 1866. It is found in South Africa.
