= Calamoschoena sexpunctata =

Scientific classification
- Kingdom: Animalia
- Phylum: Arthropoda
- Class: Insecta
- Order: Lepidoptera
- Family: Crambidae
- Genus: Calamoschoena
- Species: C. sexpunctata

Binomial name
- Calamoschoena sexpunctata (Aurivillius, 1925)

Synonyms
- Varpa sexpunctata Aurivillius, 1925

Species of moth

Calamoschoena sexpunctata is a moth in the family Crambidae. It was described by Per Olof Christopher Aurivillius in 1925. It is found in the Democratic Republic of the Congo.
