= Archischoenobius nigrolepis =

Scientific classification
- Kingdom: Animalia
- Phylum: Arthropoda
- Clade: Pancrustacea
- Class: Insecta
- Order: Lepidoptera
- Family: Crambidae
- Genus: Archischoenobius
- Species: A. nigrolepis

Binomial name
- Archischoenobius nigrolepis Chen, Song & Wu, 2007

Species of moth

Archischoenobius nigrolepis is a moth in the family Crambidae. It was described by Fu-Qiang Chen, Shi-Mei Song and Chun-Sheng Wu in 2007. It is found in the Chinese provinces of Hunan and Fujian.
