= Alloperissa =

Scientific classification
- Kingdom: Animalia
- Phylum: Arthropoda
- Class: Insecta
- Order: Lepidoptera
- Family: Crambidae
- Subfamily: Schoenobiinae
- Genus: Alloperissa; Meyrick, 1934
- Species: A. creagraula

Binomial name
- Alloperissa creagraula Meyrick, 1934

Genus of moths

Alloperissa is a genus of moths of the family Crambidae. It contains only one species, Alloperissa creagraula, which is found on Fiji.
