= Leechia exquisitalis =

Scientific classification
- Kingdom: Animalia
- Phylum: Arthropoda
- Class: Insecta
- Order: Lepidoptera
- Family: Crambidae
- Genus: Leechia
- Species: L. exquisitalis

Binomial name
- Leechia exquisitalis (Caradja, 1927)

Synonyms
- Trichophysetis exquisitalis Caradja, 1927

Species of moth

Leechia exquisitalis is a moth in the family Crambidae. It was described by Aristide Caradja in 1927. It is found in China.
