= Adelpherupa flavescens =

Scientific classification
- Kingdom: Animalia
- Phylum: Arthropoda
- Clade: Pancrustacea
- Class: Insecta
- Order: Lepidoptera
- Family: Crambidae
- Genus: Adelpherupa
- Species: A. flavescens

Binomial name
- Adelpherupa flavescens Hampson, 1919

Synonyms
- Schoenobius aurantiacus Rothschild in Sjöstedt, 1926

Species of moth

Adelpherupa flavescens is a species of moth of the family Crambidae. It is found in Benin, Kenya, Malawi, Mozambique, Niger, Nigeria, Senegal, Sudan, Tanzania and Uganda.

The larvae feed on Oryza species.
