= Ramila ruficostalis =

Scientific classification
- Kingdom: Animalia
- Phylum: Arthropoda
- Class: Insecta
- Order: Lepidoptera
- Family: Crambidae
- Genus: Ramila
- Species: R. ruficostalis

Binomial name
- Ramila ruficostalis Hampson, 1893

Species of moth

Ramila ruficostalis is a moth in the family Crambidae. It was described by George Hampson in 1893. It is found in Sri Lanka.

== Description ==
Its wingspan is about 30 mm. The male has brilliant rusty red costa of forewings. The lines rusty and interrupted. The medial line of forewings arising from the speck at middle of cell. The cilia without a black line through them, and the marginal line more maculate (spotted) on the forewings.
