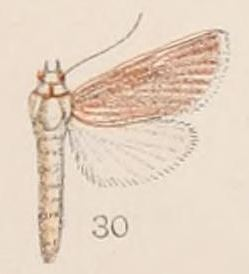

Scientific classification
- Kingdom: Animalia
- Phylum: Arthropoda
- Class: Insecta
- Order: Lepidoptera
- Family: Crambidae
- Genus: Patissa
- Species: P. intersticalis

Binomial name
- Patissa intersticalis Hampson, 1908

= Patissa intersticalis =

Species of moth

Patissa intersticalis is a moth of the family Crambidae. It is found in Sri Lanka.
