= Patissa fulvipunctalis =

Scientific classification
- Kingdom: Animalia
- Phylum: Arthropoda
- Class: Insecta
- Order: Lepidoptera
- Family: Crambidae
- Genus: Patissa
- Species: P. fulvipunctalis

Binomial name
- Patissa fulvipunctalis Hampson, 1919

Species of moth

Patissa fulvipunctalis is a moth in the family Crambidae. It was described by George Hampson in 1919. It is found in Uganda.

The wingspan is about 16 mm. The forewings are silvery white with a slight orange-fulvous discoidal spot and a subterminal spot. The hindwings are white.
