= Proschoenobius =

Scientific classification
- Kingdom: Animalia
- Phylum: Arthropoda
- Class: Insecta
- Order: Lepidoptera
- Family: Crambidae
- Subfamily: Schoenobiinae
- Genus: Proschoenobius; Munroe, 1974

Genus of moths

Proschoenobius is a genus of moths of the family Crambidae.

== Species ==
- Proschoenobius forsteri Munroe, 1974
- Proschoenobius subcervinellus (Walker, 1863)
