= Adelpherupa elongalis =

Scientific classification
- Kingdom: Animalia
- Phylum: Arthropoda
- Clade: Pancrustacea
- Class: Insecta
- Order: Lepidoptera
- Family: Crambidae
- Genus: Adelpherupa
- Species: A. elongalis

Binomial name
- Adelpherupa elongalis Maes, 2002

Species of moth

Adelpherupa elongalis is a moth in the family of Crambidae. It was described by Koen V. N. Maes in 2002. It is found in Angola, the Democratic Republic of the Congo (West Kasai, Katanga), Ethiopia, Kenya, Malawi, Nigeria, Sudan and Uganda.
