= Tipanaea intactella =

Scientific classification
- Kingdom: Animalia
- Phylum: Arthropoda
- Class: Insecta
- Order: Lepidoptera
- Family: Crambidae
- Genus: Tipanaea
- Species: T. intactella

Binomial name
- Tipanaea intactella (Walker, 1863)

Synonyms
- Scirpophaga intactella Walker, 1863

Species of moth

Tipanaea intactella is a moth in the family Crambidae. It was described by Francis Walker in 1863. It is found on Borneo.
