= Leechia bilinealis =

Scientific classification
- Kingdom: Animalia
- Phylum: Arthropoda
- Class: Insecta
- Order: Lepidoptera
- Family: Crambidae
- Genus: Leechia
- Species: L. bilinealis

Binomial name
- Leechia bilinealis South in Leech & South, 1901

Species of moth

Leechia bilinealis is a moth in the family Crambidae. It was described by South in 1901. It is found in Hubei in China and in Japan.
