= Patissa atricostalis =

Scientific classification
- Domain: Eukaryota
- Kingdom: Animalia
- Phylum: Arthropoda
- Class: Insecta
- Order: Lepidoptera
- Family: Crambidae
- Genus: Patissa
- Species: P. atricostalis

Binomial name
- Patissa atricostalis Hampson, 1919

Species of moth

Patissa atricostalis is a moth in the family Crambidae. It was described by George Hampson in 1919. It is found in Australia, where it has been recorded from Western Australia and Queensland.

The wingspan is 18–22 mm. Adults are pure whitish, with a blackish costa of the forewings.
