= Patissa fulvicepsalis =

Scientific classification
- Kingdom: Animalia
- Phylum: Arthropoda
- Class: Insecta
- Order: Lepidoptera
- Family: Crambidae
- Genus: Patissa
- Species: P. fulvicepsalis

Binomial name
- Patissa fulvicepsalis Hampson, 1919

Species of moth

Patissa fulvicepsalis is a moth in the family Crambidae. It was described by George Hampson in 1919. It is found in Malawi, Nigeria and Uganda.

The wingspan is 16–22 mm. The forewings and hindwings are uniform silvery white.
