= Patissa virginea =

Scientific classification
- Kingdom: Animalia
- Phylum: Arthropoda
- Clade: Pancrustacea
- Class: Insecta
- Order: Lepidoptera
- Family: Crambidae
- Genus: Patissa
- Species: P. virginea

Binomial name
- Patissa virginea (Zeller, 1863)

Synonyms
- Scirpophaga virginea Zeller, 1852; Crambus multivagellus Swinhoe, 1886

Species of moth

Patissa virginea is a moth in the family Crambidae. It was described by Philipp Christoph Zeller in 1863. It is found in the Democratic Republic of the Congo, Mozambique, South Africa, Taiwan, India and Sri Lanka.

== Description ==
The wingspan is 22 mm. The forewings are pure white. Palpi and legs slightly tinged with fulvous color. Forewings sometimes with a black speck at the upper angle of the cell.
