= Patissa tenuousa =

Scientific classification
- Kingdom: Animalia
- Phylum: Arthropoda
- Clade: Pancrustacea
- Class: Insecta
- Order: Lepidoptera
- Family: Crambidae
- Genus: Patissa
- Species: P. tenuousa

Binomial name
- Patissa tenuousa Chen, Song & Wu, 2007

Species of moth

Patissa tenuousa is a moth in the family Crambidae. It was described by Fu-Qiang Chen, Shi-Mei Song and Chun-Sheng Wu in 2007. It is found in Sichuan, China.

The forewings are white with thin fuscous fasciae.
