= Adelpherupa albescens =

Scientific classification
- Kingdom: Animalia
- Phylum: Arthropoda
- Clade: Pancrustacea
- Class: Insecta
- Order: Lepidoptera
- Family: Crambidae
- Genus: Adelpherupa
- Species: A. albescens

Binomial name
- Adelpherupa albescens Hampson, 1919

Species of moth

Adelpherupa albescens is a species of moth of the family Crambidae. It is found in the Democratic Republic of Congo, Kenya and Malawi.
