= Catagela adoceta =

Scientific classification
- Domain: Eukaryota
- Kingdom: Animalia
- Phylum: Arthropoda
- Class: Insecta
- Order: Lepidoptera
- Family: Crambidae
- Genus: Catagela
- Species: C. adoceta

Binomial name
- Catagela adoceta Common, 1960

Species of moth

Catagela adoceta is a moth in the family Crambidae. It was described by Ian Francis Bell Common in 1960. It is found in Australia, where it has been recorded from Queensland.
