= Adelpherupa terreus =

Scientific classification
- Kingdom: Animalia
- Phylum: Arthropoda
- Clade: Pancrustacea
- Class: Insecta
- Order: Lepidoptera
- Family: Crambidae
- Genus: Adelpherupa
- Species: A. terreus

Binomial name
- Adelpherupa terreus (Zeller, 1877)

Synonyms
- Schoenobius terreus Zeller, 1877

Species of moth

Adelpherupa terreus is a species of moth of the family Crambidae. It is found in Madagascar.
