= Patissa rufitinctalis =

Scientific classification
- Kingdom: Animalia
- Phylum: Arthropoda
- Class: Insecta
- Order: Lepidoptera
- Family: Crambidae
- Genus: Patissa
- Species: P. rufitinctalis

Binomial name
- Patissa rufitinctalis Hampson, 1919

Species of moth

Patissa rufitinctalis is a moth in the family Crambidae. It was described by George Hampson in 1919. It is found in Sierra Leone.

The wingspan is about 20 mm. The forewings are white, suffused with pale rufous. The hindwings of the males are white. The hindwings of the females are also white, but the inner area suffused with pale rufous.
