= Brihaspa nigropunctella =

Scientific classification
- Kingdom: Animalia
- Phylum: Arthropoda
- Class: Insecta
- Order: Lepidoptera
- Family: Crambidae
- Genus: Brihaspa
- Species: B. nigropunctella

Binomial name
- Brihaspa nigropunctella Pagenstecher, 1893

Species of moth

Brihaspa nigropunctella is a moth in the family Crambidae. It was described by Pagenstecher in 1893. It is found in Mozambique.
