= Leptosteges pulverulenta =

Scientific classification
- Domain: Eukaryota
- Kingdom: Animalia
- Phylum: Arthropoda
- Class: Insecta
- Order: Lepidoptera
- Family: Crambidae
- Genus: Leptosteges
- Species: L. pulverulenta

Binomial name
- Leptosteges pulverulenta Warren, 1889

Species of moth

Leptosteges pulverulenta is a moth in the family Crambidae. It was described by William Warren in 1889. It is found in the Brazilian state of Amazonas.

The wingspan is about 16 mm. The forewings are whitish, dusted with brownish and with two transverse brown lines. The hindwings are white, with the same markings as found on the forewings, but the first line is only represented as a small brown dash.
