= Calamoschoena ascriptalis =

Scientific classification
- Kingdom: Animalia
- Phylum: Arthropoda
- Class: Insecta
- Order: Lepidoptera
- Family: Crambidae
- Genus: Calamoschoena
- Species: C. ascriptalis

Binomial name
- Calamoschoena ascriptalis Hampson in Poulton, 1916

Species of moth

Calamoschoena ascriptalis is a moth in the family Crambidae. It was described by George Hampson in 1916. It is found in Kenya.
