= Patissa curvilinealis =

Scientific classification
- Kingdom: Animalia
- Phylum: Arthropoda
- Class: Insecta
- Order: Lepidoptera
- Family: Crambidae
- Genus: Patissa
- Species: P. curvilinealis

Binomial name
- Patissa curvilinealis Hampson, 1896

Species of moth

Patissa curvilinealis is a moth in the family Crambidae. It was described by George Hampson in 1896. It is found in Sri Lanka.

== Description ==
The wingspan is about 12 mm for males and 18 mm for females. The forewings are yellowish white, but the basal two-thirds of the costa are reddish brown. There is a brown line from the costa to the base of the inner margin. The hindwings are white, with faint traces of a medial brown line and a fine marginal line.
