= Helonastes =

Scientific classification
- Domain: Eukaryota
- Kingdom: Animalia
- Phylum: Arthropoda
- Class: Insecta
- Order: Lepidoptera
- Family: Crambidae
- Subfamily: Schoenobiinae
- Genus: Helonastes; Common, 1960

Genus of moths

Helonastes is a genus of moths of the family Crambidae.

== Species ==
- Helonastes acentrus Common, 1960
- Helonastes rubelineola (Wang & Sung, 1981)
