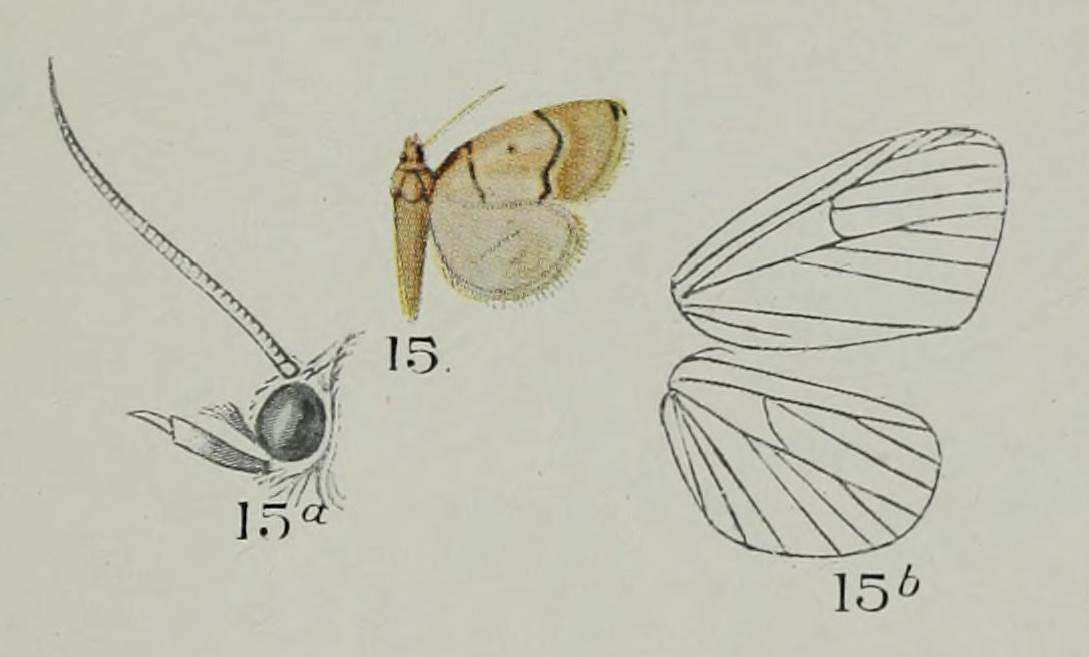
- L. sinuosalis.

Scientific classification
- Kingdom: Animalia
- Phylum: Arthropoda
- Class: Insecta
- Order: Lepidoptera
- Family: Crambidae
- Subfamily: Schoenobiinae
- Genus: Leechia; South in Leech & South, 1901

Type species
- Leechia sinuosalis South in Leech & South, 1901

= Leechia =

Genus of moths

Leechia is a genus of moths of the family Crambidae.

== Species ==
- Leechia bilinealis South in Leech & South, 1901
- Leechia exquisitalis (Caradja, 1927)
- Leechia sinuosalis South in Leech & South, 1901
