= Panalipa immeritalis =

Scientific classification
- Kingdom: Animalia
- Phylum: Arthropoda
- Class: Insecta
- Order: Lepidoptera
- Family: Crambidae
- Genus: Panalipa
- Species: P. immeritalis

Binomial name
- Panalipa immeritalis (Walker, 1859)

Synonyms
- Dosara immeritalis Walker, 1859

Species of moth

Panalipa immeritalis is a moth in the family Crambidae. It was described by Francis Walker in 1859. It is found in Sri Lanka.
