= Brihaspa atrostigmella =

Scientific classification
- Kingdom: Animalia
- Phylum: Arthropoda
- Class: Insecta
- Order: Lepidoptera
- Family: Crambidae
- Genus: Brihaspa
- Species: B. atrostigmella

Binomial name
- Brihaspa atrostigmella Moore, 1867

Species of moth

Brihaspa atrostigmella is a moth in the family Crambidae. It was described by Frederic Moore in 1867. It is found in India (Sikkim), Myanmar, China (Guangdong, Guangxi, Yunnan), Bhutan, Bangladesh, Vietnam and Thailand.

== Subspecies ==
- Brihaspa atrostigmella atrostigmella
- Brihaspa atrostigmella sinensis Caradja, 1933
