= Patissa fulvosparsa =

Scientific classification
- Domain: Eukaryota
- Kingdom: Animalia
- Phylum: Arthropoda
- Class: Insecta
- Order: Lepidoptera
- Family: Crambidae
- Genus: Patissa
- Species: P. fulvosparsa

Binomial name
- Patissa fulvosparsa (Butler, 1881)

Synonyms
- Apurima fulvosparsa Butler, 1881; Metasia candidulalis Swinhoe, 1885; Patissa candidulalis Swinhoe & Cotes, 1889; Patissa tortualis Snellen, 1893; Donacaula chlorosema Meyrick, 1894

Species of moth

Patissa fulvosparsa is a moth in the family Crambidae. It was described by Arthur Gardiner Butler in 1881. It is found in China (Shandong, Jiangxi, Guangdong, Hainan, Yunnan), Taiwan, Japan, Korea, India and Indonesia.

The wingspan is about 25 mm.
