= Catagela subdotatella =

Scientific classification
- Kingdom: Animalia
- Phylum: Arthropoda
- Class: Insecta
- Order: Lepidoptera
- Family: Crambidae
- Genus: Catagela
- Species: C. subdotatella

Binomial name
- Catagela subdotatella Inoue, 1982

Species of moth

Catagela subdotatella is a moth in the family Crambidae. It was described by Hiroshi Inoue in 1982. It is found in Japan.
