= Patissa lactealis =

Scientific classification
- Domain: Eukaryota
- Kingdom: Animalia
- Phylum: Arthropoda
- Class: Insecta
- Order: Lepidoptera
- Family: Crambidae
- Genus: Patissa
- Species: P. lactealis

Binomial name
- Patissa lactealis (C. Felder, R. Felder & Rogenhofer, 1875)

Synonyms
- Metasia lactealis C. Felder, R. Felder & Rogenhofer, 1875

Species of moth

Patissa lactealis is a moth in the family Crambidae. It was described by Cajetan Felder, Rudolf Felder and Alois Friedrich Rogenhofer in 1875. It is found in Sri Lanka.

== Description ==
The wingspan of the male is 20 mm. The male is white, with fuscous-brown irrorations (speckles). Forewings with obscure subbasal brown line. There are prominent curved antemedial line. The postmedial line nearly straight from costa to vein 3, then recurved to costa and enclosing two black spots on discocellulars in a figure-of-8 shaped mark, angled outwards on vein 2, and oblique to inner margin. A minutely dentate submarginal brown line and series of specks found on cilia. Hindwings pure white, with a brown lunule on inner margin above angle, and brown line from vein 2 to inner margin near anal angle.

The wingspan of the female is 22 mm. It is much irrorated with brown. Forewings with retracted figure-of-8 shaped portion of the postmedial line and discocellular specks obsolescent. The submarginal line whitish. Hindwings pure white.
