= Patissa heldi =

Scientific classification
- Domain: Eukaryota
- Kingdom: Animalia
- Phylum: Arthropoda
- Class: Insecta
- Order: Lepidoptera
- Family: Crambidae
- Genus: Patissa
- Species: P. heldi

Binomial name
- Patissa heldi E. Hering, 1903

Species of moth

Patissa heldi is a moth in the family Crambidae. It was described by E. Hering in 1903. It is found on Sumatra.
