= Leptosteges semicostalis =

Scientific classification
- Kingdom: Animalia
- Phylum: Arthropoda
- Class: Insecta
- Order: Lepidoptera
- Family: Crambidae
- Genus: Leptosteges
- Species: L. semicostalis

Binomial name
- Leptosteges semicostalis (Snellen, 1893)

Synonyms
- Patissa semicostalis Snellen, 1893

Species of moth

Leptosteges semicostalis is a moth in the family Crambidae. It is found in Colombia.
