= Patissa termipunctalis =

Scientific classification
- Kingdom: Animalia
- Phylum: Arthropoda
- Clade: Pancrustacea
- Class: Insecta
- Order: Lepidoptera
- Family: Crambidae
- Genus: Patissa
- Species: P. termipunctalis

Binomial name
- Patissa termipunctalis (Hampson, 1919)

Synonyms
- Topeutis termipunctalis Hampson, 1919

Species of moth

Patissa termipunctalis is a moth in the family Crambidae. It was described by George Hampson in 1919. It is found in Malawi.

The wingspan is about 16 mm. The forewings are pale pink, irrorated (sprinkled) with a few dark brown scales, as well as a slight dark brown spot at the lower angle of the cell and a terminal series of black points. The hindwings are silvery white.
