= Leptosteges flavicostella =

Scientific classification
- Domain: Eukaryota
- Kingdom: Animalia
- Phylum: Arthropoda
- Class: Insecta
- Order: Lepidoptera
- Family: Crambidae
- Genus: Leptosteges
- Species: L. flavicostella

Binomial name
- Leptosteges flavicostella (Fernald, 1887)

Synonyms
- Scirpophaga flavicostella Fernald, 1887; Patissa flavicostella

Species of moth

Leptosteges flavicostella is a moth in the family Crambidae. It was described by Charles H. Fernald in 1887. It is found in North America, where it has been recorded from Florida, South Carolina and Georgia.

The wingspan is 11–13 mm. Adults are on wing from April to November in Florida.
