= Brihaspa =

Scientific classification
- Kingdom: Animalia
- Phylum: Arthropoda
- Class: Insecta
- Order: Lepidoptera
- Family: Crambidae
- Subfamily: Schoenobiinae
- Genus: Brihaspa; Moore, 1868

Genus of moths

Brihaspa is a genus of moths of the family Crambidae.

== Species ==
- Brihaspa abacodes Meyrick, 1933
- Brihaspa atrostigmella Moore, 1867
- Brihaspa autocratica Meyrick, 1933
- Brihaspa chrysostomus Zeller, 1852
- Brihaspa frontalis (Walker, 1866)
- Brihaspa nigropunctella Pagenstecher, 1893
