= Carectocultus bivitta =

Scientific classification
- Kingdom: Animalia
- Phylum: Arthropoda
- Class: Insecta
- Order: Lepidoptera
- Family: Crambidae
- Genus: Carectocultus
- Species: C. bivitta

Binomial name
- Carectocultus bivitta Möschler, 1882

Synonyms
- Phalaena Tinea argentella Stoll in Cramer & Stoll, 1781

Species of moth

Carectocultus bivitta is a moth in the family Crambidae. It was described by Heinrich Benno Möschler in 1882. It is found in Suriname.
