= Leptosteges vestaliella =

Scientific classification
- Kingdom: Animalia
- Phylum: Arthropoda
- Clade: Pancrustacea
- Class: Insecta
- Order: Lepidoptera
- Family: Crambidae
- Genus: Leptosteges
- Species: L. vestaliella

Binomial name
- Leptosteges vestaliella (Zeller, 1872)

Synonyms
- Scirpophaga vestaliella Zeller, 1872

Species of moth

Leptosteges vestaliella is a moth in the family Crambidae. It was described by Zeller in 1872. It is found in North America, where it has been recorded from Florida, Mississippi, Oklahoma, South Carolina and Texas.

The wingspan is about 12–13 mm. Adults have been recorded on wing from May to October.
