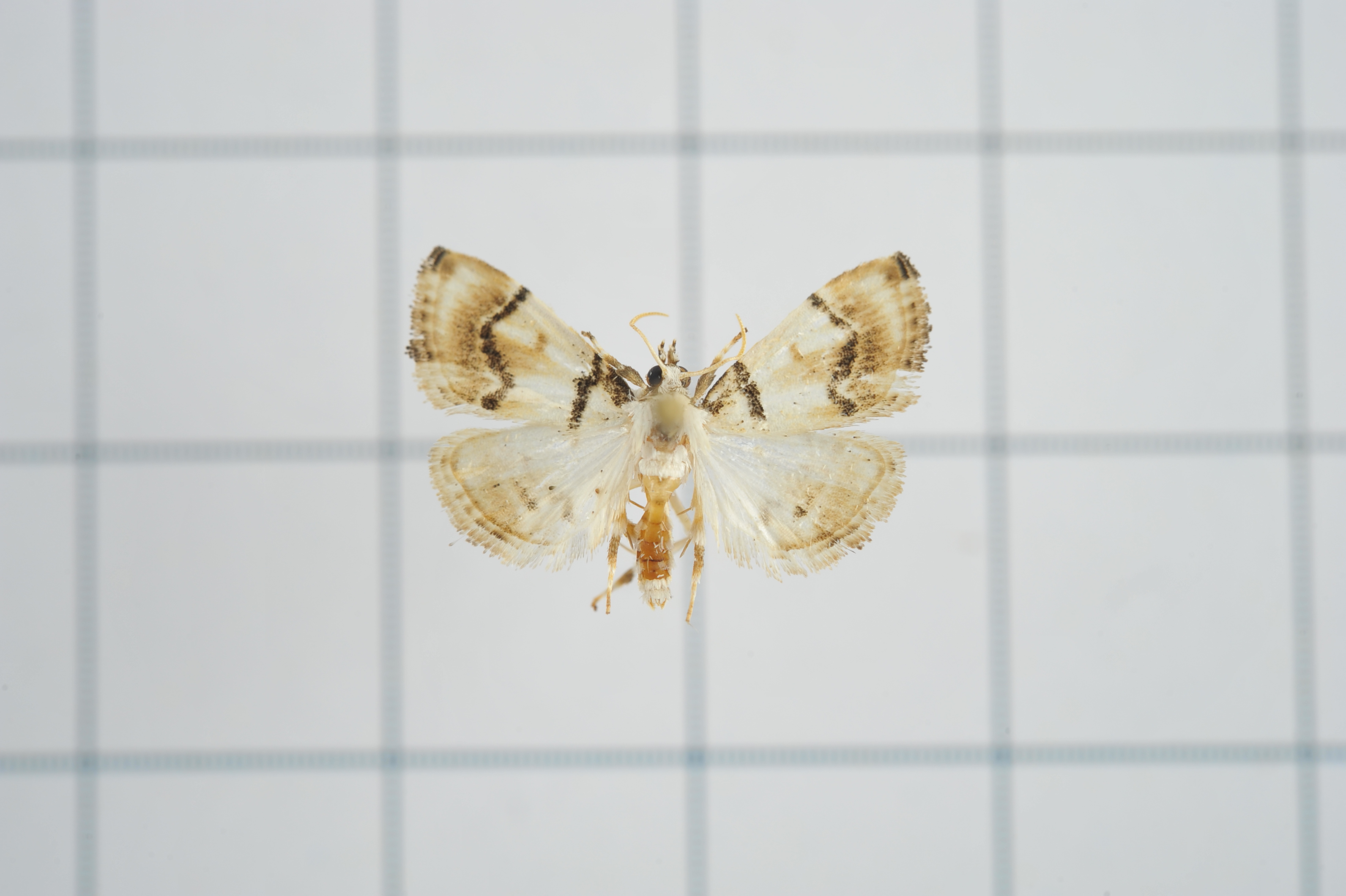

Scientific classification
- Kingdom: Animalia
- Phylum: Arthropoda
- Class: Insecta
- Order: Lepidoptera
- Family: Crambidae
- Genus: Leechia
- Species: L. sinuosalis

Binomial name
- Leechia sinuosalis South in Leech & South, 1901

Synonyms
- Leechia formosensis Wileman & South, 1918

= Leechia sinuosalis =

Species of moth

Leechia sinuosalis is a moth in the family Crambidae. It was described by South in 1901. It is found in China (Shaanxi, Gansu, Anhui, Hubei, Jiangxi, Hunan, Fujian, Guangdong, Sichuan), Japan and Taiwan.
