= Archischoenobius =

Scientific classification
- Kingdom: Animalia
- Phylum: Arthropoda
- Clade: Pancrustacea
- Class: Insecta
- Order: Lepidoptera
- Family: Crambidae
- Subfamily: Schoenobiinae
- Genus: Archischoenobius; Speidel, 1984

Genus of moths

Archischoenobius is a genus of moths of the family Crambidae described by Speidel in 1984. Currently described species are endemic to China.

== Species ==
- Archischoenobius minumus Chen, Song & Wu, 2007
- Archischoenobius nanlingensis Chen, Song & Wu, 2007
- Archischoenobius nigrolepis Chen, Song & Wu, 2007
- Archischoenobius pallidalis (South in Leech & South, 1901)
