= Adelpherupa typicota =

Scientific classification
- Kingdom: Animalia
- Phylum: Arthropoda
- Clade: Pancrustacea
- Class: Insecta
- Order: Lepidoptera
- Family: Crambidae
- Genus: Adelpherupa
- Species: A. typicota

Binomial name
- Adelpherupa typicota (Meyrick, 1933)

Synonyms
- Schoenoploca typicota Meyrick, 1933; Limnopsares gymnastica Meyrick, 1934

Species of moth

Adelpherupa typicota is a species of moth of the family Crambidae. It is found in the Democratic Republic of Congo (Orientale, Equateur, Kinshasa and Katanga) and Tanzania.
