= Dejoannisia =

Scientific classification
- Kingdom: Animalia
- Phylum: Arthropoda
- Class: Insecta
- Order: Lepidoptera
- Family: Crambidae
- Subfamily: Schoenobiinae
- Genus: Dejoannisia; Vári, 2002
- Species: D. pallidella

Binomial name
- Dejoannisia pallidella (de Joannis, 1927)

Synonyms
- Schoenobiodes pallidella de Joannis, 1927

Genus of moths

Dejoannisia is a genus of moths of the family Crambidae. It contains only one species, Dejoannisia pallidella, which is found in Mozambique.
