= Patissa pulverea =

Scientific classification
- Kingdom: Animalia
- Phylum: Arthropoda
- Class: Insecta
- Order: Lepidoptera
- Family: Crambidae
- Genus: Patissa
- Species: P. pulverea

Binomial name
- Patissa pulverea (Hampson, 1919)

Synonyms
- Donacaula pulverea Hampson, 1919

Species of moth

Patissa pulverea is a moth in the family Crambidae. It was described by George Hampson in 1919. It is found in South Africa.

The wingspan is about 24 mm for males and 26 mm for females. The forewings are white, irrorated (sprinkled) with fuscous and with a black point at the lower angle of the cell. There is a curved fuscous line from the apex to the middle of the inner margin, as well as a terminal series of black points. There are traces of a line on the hindwings, from the apex to the tornus formed by slight fuscous irroration. There is also a terminal series of black points.
