= Niphadoses chionotus =

Scientific classification
- Kingdom: Animalia
- Phylum: Arthropoda
- Class: Insecta
- Order: Lepidoptera
- Family: Crambidae
- Genus: Niphadoses
- Species: N. chionotus

Binomial name
- Niphadoses chionotus (Meyrick, 1889)

Synonyms
- Schoenobius chionotus Meyrick, 1889

Species of moth

Niphadoses chionotus is a moth in the family Crambidae. It was described by Edward Meyrick in 1889. It is found on New Guinea.
