= Leptosteges onirophanta =

Scientific classification
- Kingdom: Animalia
- Phylum: Arthropoda
- Class: Insecta
- Order: Lepidoptera
- Family: Crambidae
- Genus: Leptosteges
- Species: L. onirophanta

Binomial name
- Leptosteges onirophanta (Dyar, 1914)

Synonyms
- Patissa onirophanta Dyar, 1914

Species of moth

Leptosteges onirophanta is a moth in the family Crambidae. It was described by Harrison Gray Dyar Jr. in 1914 and is found in Panama.

The wingspan is about 9 mm. The wings are white, with a dark brown costa to near the middle. The lines are pale brown. Adults have been recorded on wing from April to May and from August to November.
