= Patissa vagilinealis =

Scientific classification
- Kingdom: Animalia
- Phylum: Arthropoda
- Class: Insecta
- Order: Lepidoptera
- Family: Crambidae
- Genus: Patissa
- Species: P. vagilinealis

Binomial name
- Patissa vagilinealis Hampson, 1908

Species of moth

Patissa vagilinealis is a moth in the family Crambidae. It was described by George Hampson in 1908. It is found on Madagascar.
