= Patissa melitopis =

Scientific classification
- Kingdom: Animalia
- Phylum: Arthropoda
- Class: Insecta
- Order: Lepidoptera
- Family: Crambidae
- Genus: Patissa
- Species: P. melitopis

Binomial name
- Patissa melitopis (Meyrick, 1933)

Synonyms
- Scirpophaga melitopis Meyrick, 1933

Species of moth

Patissa melitopis is a moth in the family Crambidae. It was described by Edward Meyrick in 1933. It is found in the Democratic Republic of the Congo, where it has been recorded from Katanga, West Kasai and Orientale.
