= Patissa punctum =

Scientific classification
- Domain: Eukaryota
- Kingdom: Animalia
- Phylum: Arthropoda
- Class: Insecta
- Order: Lepidoptera
- Family: Crambidae
- Genus: Patissa
- Species: P. punctum

Binomial name
- Patissa punctum de Joannis, 1930

Species of moth

Patissa punctum is a moth in the family Crambidae. It was described by Joseph de Joannis in 1930. It is found in Vietnam.
