= Ramila marginella =

Scientific classification
- Domain: Eukaryota
- Kingdom: Animalia
- Phylum: Arthropoda
- Class: Insecta
- Order: Lepidoptera
- Family: Crambidae
- Genus: Ramila
- Species: R. marginella

Binomial name
- Ramila marginella Moore, [1868]

Species of moth

Ramila marginella is a moth in the family Crambidae. It was described by Frederic Moore in 1868. It can be found in China (Guangxi, Yunnan) and India.

Adults are silvery white, with a fuscous costa of the forewings.
