= Leucoides =

Scientific classification
- Kingdom: Animalia
- Phylum: Arthropoda
- Class: Insecta
- Order: Lepidoptera
- Family: Crambidae
- Subfamily: Schoenobiinae
- Genus: Leucoides; Hampson, 1893
- Species: L. fuscicostalis

Binomial name
- Leucoides fuscicostalis Hampson, 1893

Genus of moths

Leucoides is a monotypic moth genus of the family Crambidae. It contains only one species, Leucoides fuscicostalis, which is found in Sri Lanka.

== Description ==
The palpi are porrect (extended forward), slightly scaled and extending about twice the length of the head. Maxillary palpi long and somewhat dilated at extremity. Frons produced and acute. Antennae of male minutely serrate and ciliated. Legs long and slender, the outer spurs about two-thirds length of inner. Abdomen long. Wings long and narrow. Forewings with produced and acute apex. The outer margin oblique. Vein 3 from angle of cell and veins 4 and 5 stalked. Vein 6 from upper angle and veins 7, 8 and 9 stalked. Vein 10 free and vein 11 becoming coincident with vein 12. Hindwings with vein 3 from near angle of cell. Veins 4 and 5 and veins 6 and 7 are stalked. Male pure white. Palpi, sides of frons, and forelegs rufous. Forewings with the costal area fuscous brown. Traces of antemedial and postmedial series of rufous specks found on the veins.
