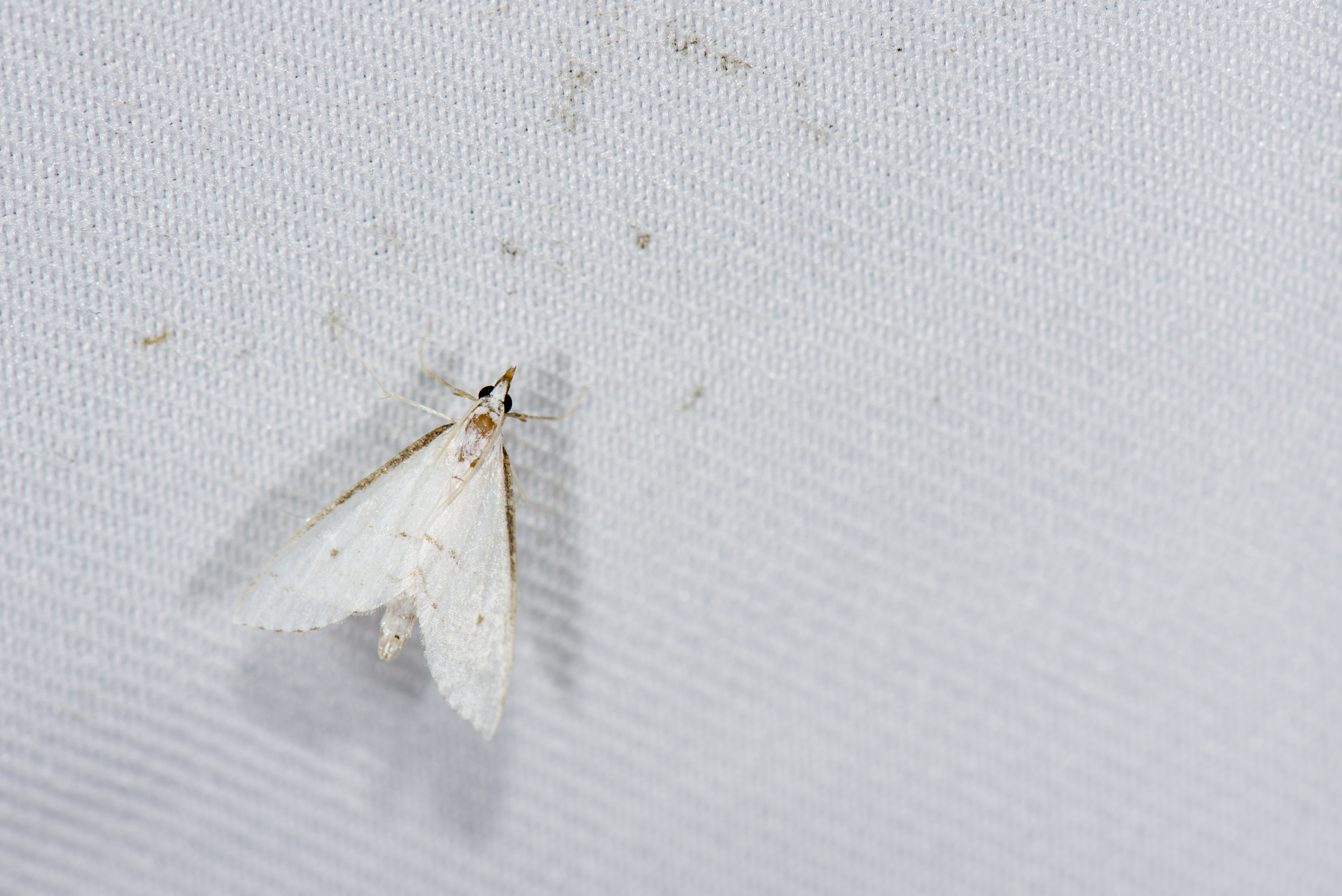

Scientific classification
- Kingdom: Animalia
- Phylum: Arthropoda
- Class: Insecta
- Order: Lepidoptera
- Family: Crambidae
- Subfamily: Schoenobiinae
- Genus: Ramila; Moore, 1868

Synonyms
- Crambostenia Warren in Swinhoe, 1890; Ramilla West, 1931

= Ramila =

Genus of moths

Ramila is a genus of moths of the family Crambidae.

== Description ==
The palpi are porrect (extending forward) and slightly scaled, where the third joint is downcurved. Maxillary palpi dilated with scales and nearly as long as the labial palps. Frons produced to a rounded projection nearly as long as the palpi. Antennae ciliated (hairy). Tibia slightly hairy, with short spurs. Forewings with produced apex to a point. Vein 3 from before angle of cell. Veins 4 and 5 from angle and vein 6 from near upper angle. Veins 7, 8 and 9 stalked and vein 11 becoming coincident with vein 12. Hindwings with vein 3 from before angle of cell. Veins 4 and 5 from angle and veins 6 and 7 stalked.

== Species ==
- Ramila acciusalis (Walker, 1859)
- Ramila angustifimbrialis (Warren in Swinhoe, 1890)
- Ramila marginella Moore, [1868]
- Ramila minima Chen & Wu, 2014
- Ramila ruficostalis Hampson, 1893
- Ramila thectopetina (West, 1931)
