= Chionobosca =

Scientific classification
- Kingdom: Animalia
- Phylum: Arthropoda
- Class: Insecta
- Order: Lepidoptera
- Family: Crambidae
- Subfamily: Schoenobiinae
- Genus: Chionobosca; Turner, 1911
- Species: C. actinopis

Binomial name
- Chionobosca actinopis Turner, 1911

Genus of moths

Chionobosca is a genus of moths of the family Crambidae. It contains only one species, Chionobosca actinopis, which is found in Australia, where it has been recorded from the Northern Territory.
