= Brihaspa autocratica =

Scientific classification
- Kingdom: Animalia
- Phylum: Arthropoda
- Class: Insecta
- Order: Lepidoptera
- Family: Crambidae
- Genus: Brihaspa
- Species: B. autocratica

Binomial name
- Brihaspa autocratica Meyrick, 1933

Species of moth

Brihaspa autocratica is a moth in the family Crambidae. It was described by Edward Meyrick in 1933. It is found in the former Katanga Province of the Democratic Republic of the Congo.
