= Patissa fulvidorsalis =

Scientific classification
- Kingdom: Animalia
- Phylum: Arthropoda
- Class: Insecta
- Order: Lepidoptera
- Family: Crambidae
- Genus: Patissa
- Species: P. fulvidorsalis

Binomial name
- Patissa fulvidorsalis Hampson, 1903

Species of moth

Patissa fulvidorsalis is a moth in the family Crambidae. It was described by George Hampson in 1903. It is found in Sikkim, India.
