= Patissa minima =

Scientific classification
- Kingdom: Animalia
- Phylum: Arthropoda
- Class: Insecta
- Order: Lepidoptera
- Family: Crambidae
- Genus: Patissa
- Species: P. minima

Binomial name
- Patissa minima Inoue, 1995

Species of moth

Patissa minima is a moth in the family Crambidae. It was described by Hiroshi Inoue in 1995. It is found in China (Anhui, Jiangxi, Fujian, Guangxi) and Japan.

The forewings are white with pale yellow fasciae.
