= Patissa fractilinealis =

Scientific classification
- Kingdom: Animalia
- Phylum: Arthropoda
- Class: Insecta
- Order: Lepidoptera
- Family: Crambidae
- Genus: Patissa
- Species: P. fractilinealis

Binomial name
- Patissa fractilinealis Hampson, 1919

Species of moth

Patissa fractilinealis is a moth in the family Crambidae. It was described by George Hampson in 1919. It is found in Kenya and Uganda.

The wingspan is about 22 mm. The forewings are white irrorated (sprinkled) with chocolate brown. The costal edge is chocolate brown on the basal half, a small chocolate-brown spot at the upper angle of the cell and a chocolate-brown line from the costa to the inner margin. The hindwings are white, irrorated with some chocolate-brown scales on the terminal half.
