= Patissa tinctalis =

Scientific classification
- Kingdom: Animalia
- Phylum: Arthropoda
- Class: Insecta
- Order: Lepidoptera
- Family: Crambidae
- Genus: Patissa
- Species: P. tinctalis

Binomial name
- Patissa tinctalis (Hampson, 1919)

Synonyms
- Brihaspa tinctalis Hampson, 1919; Donacaula catoxodes Turner, 1911

Species of moth

Patissa tinctalis is a moth in the family Crambidae. It was described by George Hampson in 1919. It is found in Australia, where it has been recorded from Queensland.

The wingspan is about 20 mm. The forewings are white tinged with fulvous brown and with a double fulvous-brown subterminal line. The hindwings are white with a very slight fulvous brown tinge.
