= Patissa rubrilinealis =

Scientific classification
- Kingdom: Animalia
- Phylum: Arthropoda
- Class: Insecta
- Order: Lepidoptera
- Family: Crambidae
- Genus: Patissa
- Species: P. rubrilinealis

Binomial name
- Patissa rubrilinealis Hampson, 1919

Species of moth

Patissa rubrilinealis is a moth in the family Crambidae. It was described by George Hampson in 1919. It is found in Malawi.

The wingspan is about 12 mm (0.47 in). The forewings are silvery white with a scarlet medial line from below the costa to the inner margin. The hindwings are silvery white.
