= Patissa latifuscalis =

Scientific classification
- Kingdom: Animalia
- Phylum: Arthropoda
- Class: Insecta
- Order: Lepidoptera
- Family: Crambidae
- Genus: Patissa
- Species: P. latifuscalis

Binomial name
- Patissa latifuscalis Hampson, 1896

Species of moth

Patissa latifuscalis is a moth in the family Crambidae. It was described by George Hampson in 1896. It is found in Assam, India.

The wingspan is about 26 mm. The forewings are white with a fuscous black costal area and a black basal patch, as well as a black medial band. There is a fuscous postmedial line on the hindwings.
