= Carectocultus perstrialis =

Scientific classification
- Kingdom: Animalia
- Phylum: Arthropoda
- Clade: Pancrustacea
- Class: Insecta
- Order: Lepidoptera
- Family: Crambidae
- Genus: Carectocultus
- Species: C. perstrialis

Binomial name
- Carectocultus perstrialis (Hübner, 1831)

Synonyms
- Crambus serriradiellus Walker, 1863; Schoenobius macrinellus Zeller, 1866; Chilo repugnatalis Walker, 1863; Carectocultus repugnatalis; Argyria consortalis Dyar, 1909; Chilo funerellus Hampson, 1901

Species of moth

Carectocultus perstrialis, the reed-boring crambid moth, is a species of a moth in the family Crambidae. It was described by Jacob Hübner in 1831. It is found in North America, where it has been recorded from Florida, Georgia, Maryland, Massachusetts, Mississippi, Nova Scotia, Ohio, South Carolina and Texas. Outside of the United States, it has also been recorded from the West Indies (including the Bahamas, Cuba and the Dominican Republic) and South America (including Venezuela).

Adults are on wing year round in Florida and from June to August in the rest of the United States.
