= Panalipa =

Scientific classification
- Kingdom: Animalia
- Phylum: Arthropoda
- Class: Insecta
- Order: Lepidoptera
- Family: Crambidae
- Subfamily: Schoenobiinae
- Genus: Panalipa; Moore, 1866

Synonyms
- Microschoenis Meyrick, 1887

Genus of moths

Panalipa is a genus of moths of the family Crambidae.

== Species ==
- Panalipa bisignatus (Swinhoe, 1886)
- Panalipa immeritalis (Walker, 1859)
