= Patissa tonkinialis =

Scientific classification
- Domain: Eukaryota
- Kingdom: Animalia
- Phylum: Arthropoda
- Class: Insecta
- Order: Lepidoptera
- Family: Crambidae
- Genus: Patissa
- Species: P. tonkinialis

Binomial name
- Patissa tonkinialis Caradja, 1926

Species of moth

Patissa tonkinialis is a moth in the family Crambidae. It was described by Aristide Caradja in 1926. It is found in Vietnam.
