= Niphadoses hoplites =

Scientific classification
- Kingdom: Animalia
- Phylum: Arthropoda
- Class: Insecta
- Order: Lepidoptera
- Family: Crambidae
- Genus: Niphadoses
- Species: N. hoplites

Binomial name
- Niphadoses hoplites Common, 1960

Species of moth

Niphadoses hoplites is a moth in the family Crambidae. It was described by Ian Francis Bell Common in 1960. It is found in Australia.
