= Leptosteges sordidalis =

Scientific classification
- Domain: Eukaryota
- Kingdom: Animalia
- Phylum: Arthropoda
- Class: Insecta
- Order: Lepidoptera
- Family: Crambidae
- Genus: Leptosteges
- Species: L. sordidalis

Binomial name
- Leptosteges sordidalis (Barnes & McDunnough, 1913)

Synonyms
- Patissa sordidalis Barnes & McDunnough, 1913

Species of moth

Leptosteges sordidalis is a moth in the family Crambidae. It was described by William Barnes and James Halliday McDunnough in 1913. It is found in North America, where it has been recorded from Florida, Ohio, South Carolina and Ontario.
