= Helonastes rubelineola =

Scientific classification
- Domain: Eukaryota
- Kingdom: Animalia
- Phylum: Arthropoda
- Class: Insecta
- Order: Lepidoptera
- Family: Crambidae
- Genus: Helonastes
- Species: H. rubelineola

Binomial name
- Helonastes rubelineola (Wang & Sung, 1981)

Synonyms
- Catagela rubelineola Wang & Sung, 1981

Species of moth

Helonastes rubelineola is a moth in the family Crambidae. It was described by Wang and Sung in 1981. It is found in China (Anhui, Jiangxi, Guangdong).
