= Patissa nigropunctata =

Scientific classification
- Domain: Eukaryota
- Kingdom: Animalia
- Phylum: Arthropoda
- Class: Insecta
- Order: Lepidoptera
- Family: Crambidae
- Genus: Patissa
- Species: P. nigropunctata

Binomial name
- Patissa nigropunctata (Wileman & South, 1918)

Synonyms
- Scirpophaga nigropunctata Wileman & South, 1918

Species of moth

Patissa nigropunctata is a moth in the family Crambidae. It was described by Wileman and South in 1918. It is found in Taiwan.
