= Patissa geminalis =

Scientific classification
- Kingdom: Animalia
- Phylum: Arthropoda
- Class: Insecta
- Order: Lepidoptera
- Family: Crambidae
- Genus: Patissa
- Species: P. geminalis

Binomial name
- Patissa geminalis Hampson, 1919

Species of moth

Patissa geminalis is a moth in the family Crambidae. It was described by George Hampson in 1919. It is found in Kenya, Malawi, Tanzania, Uganda and Zimbabwe.

The moth's wingspan is 20–30 mm. The forewings are silvery white with black points at the upper and lower angles of the cell. The hindwings are silvery white.
