= Calamoschoena =

Scientific classification
- Kingdom: Animalia
- Phylum: Arthropoda
- Class: Insecta
- Order: Lepidoptera
- Family: Crambidae
- Subfamily: Schoenobiinae
- Genus: Calamoschoena; Poulton, 1916

Synonyms
- Eurycerota Janse, 1917; Varpa Aurivillius, 1925

Genus of moths

Calamoschoena is a genus of moths of the family Crambidae.

== Species ==
- Calamoschoena ascriptalis Hampson in Poulton, 1916
- Calamoschoena nigripunctalis Hampson, 1919
- Calamoschoena sexpunctata (Aurivillius, 1925)
- Calamoschoena stictalis Hampson, 1919
