= Patissa ochroalis =

Scientific classification
- Kingdom: Animalia
- Phylum: Arthropoda
- Clade: Pancrustacea
- Class: Insecta
- Order: Lepidoptera
- Family: Crambidae
- Genus: Patissa
- Species: P. ochroalis

Binomial name
- Patissa ochroalis Hampson, 1919

Species of moth

Patissa ochroalis is a moth in the family Crambidae. It was described by George Hampson in 1919. It is found in Suriname and Amazonas, Brazil.

The wingspan is about 14 mm. The forewings are ochreous yellow with a red-brown costa. The hindwings are of the males are ochreous yellow, while those of the females are ochreous white.
