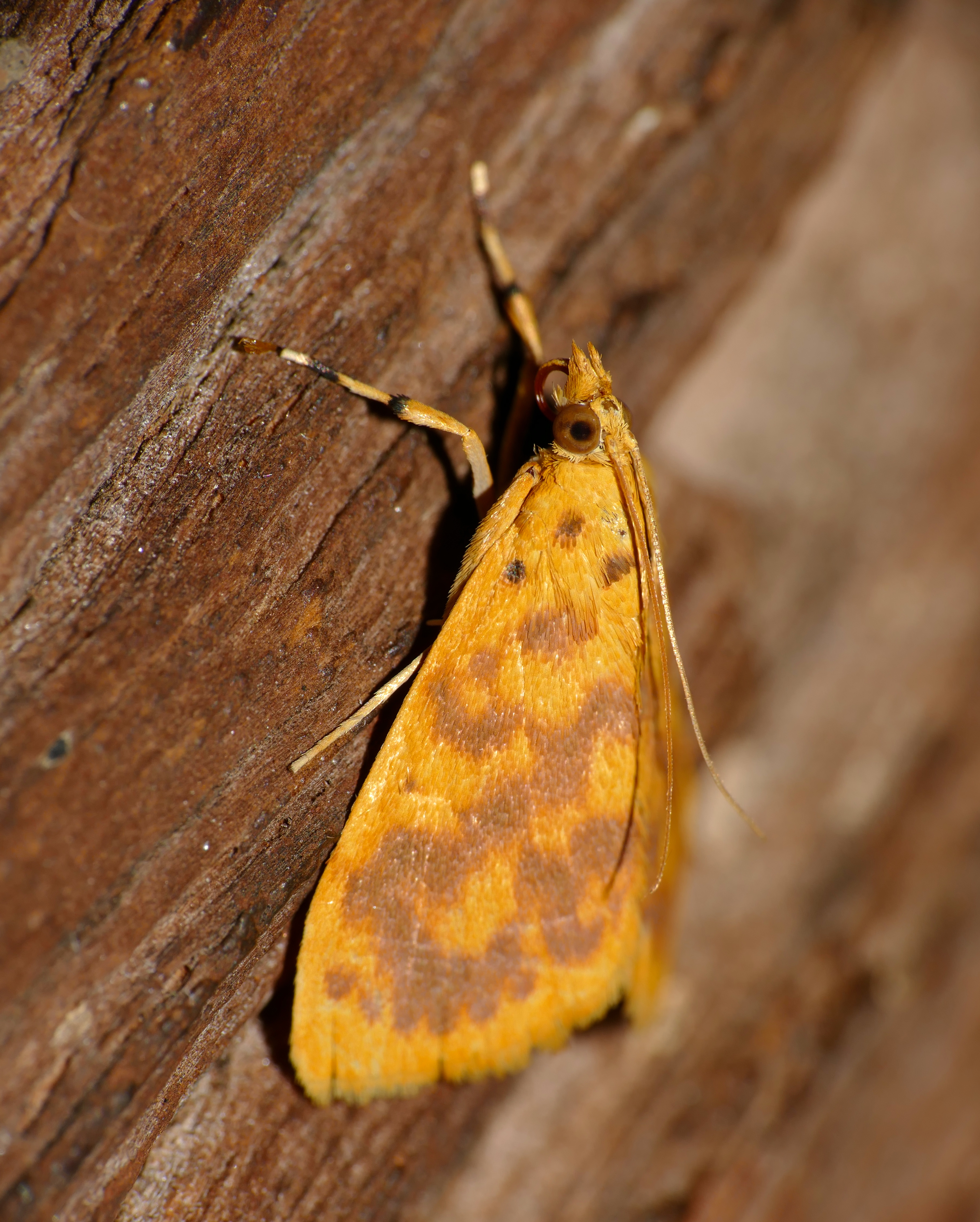
- Adult of Pioneabathra olesialis

Scientific classification
- Kingdom: Animalia
- Phylum: Arthropoda
- Clade: Pancrustacea
- Class: Insecta
- Order: Lepidoptera
- Family: Crambidae
- Subfamily: Pyraustinae
- Tribe: Portentomorphini; Amsel, 1956

= Portentomorphini =

Tribe of moths

Portentomorphini is a tribe of the subfamily Pyraustinae in the pyraloid moth family Crambidae. The tribe was initially erected by Hans Georg Amsel in 1956.

== Description ==
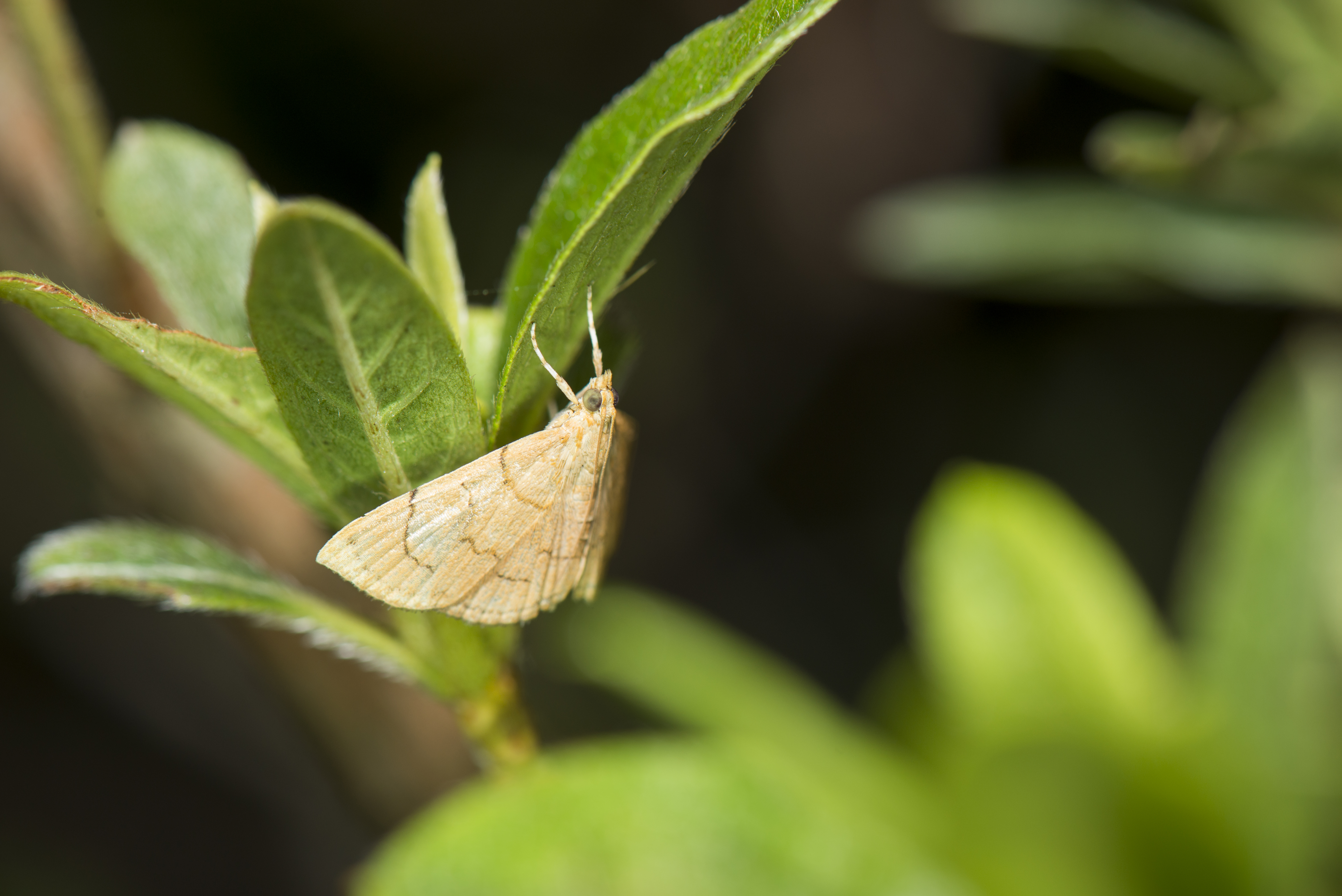
an unidentified Hyalobathra species

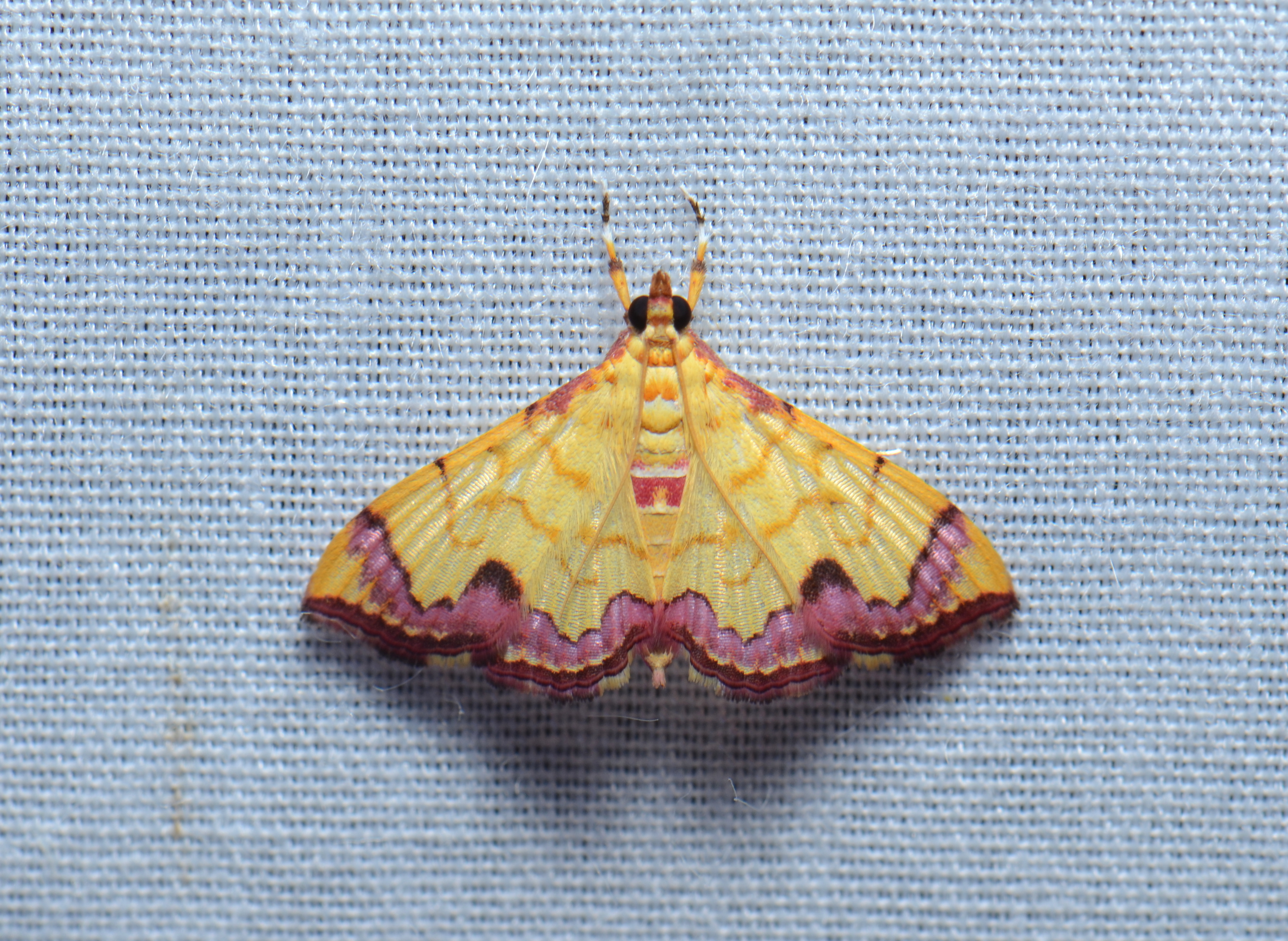
Hyalobathra phoenicozona

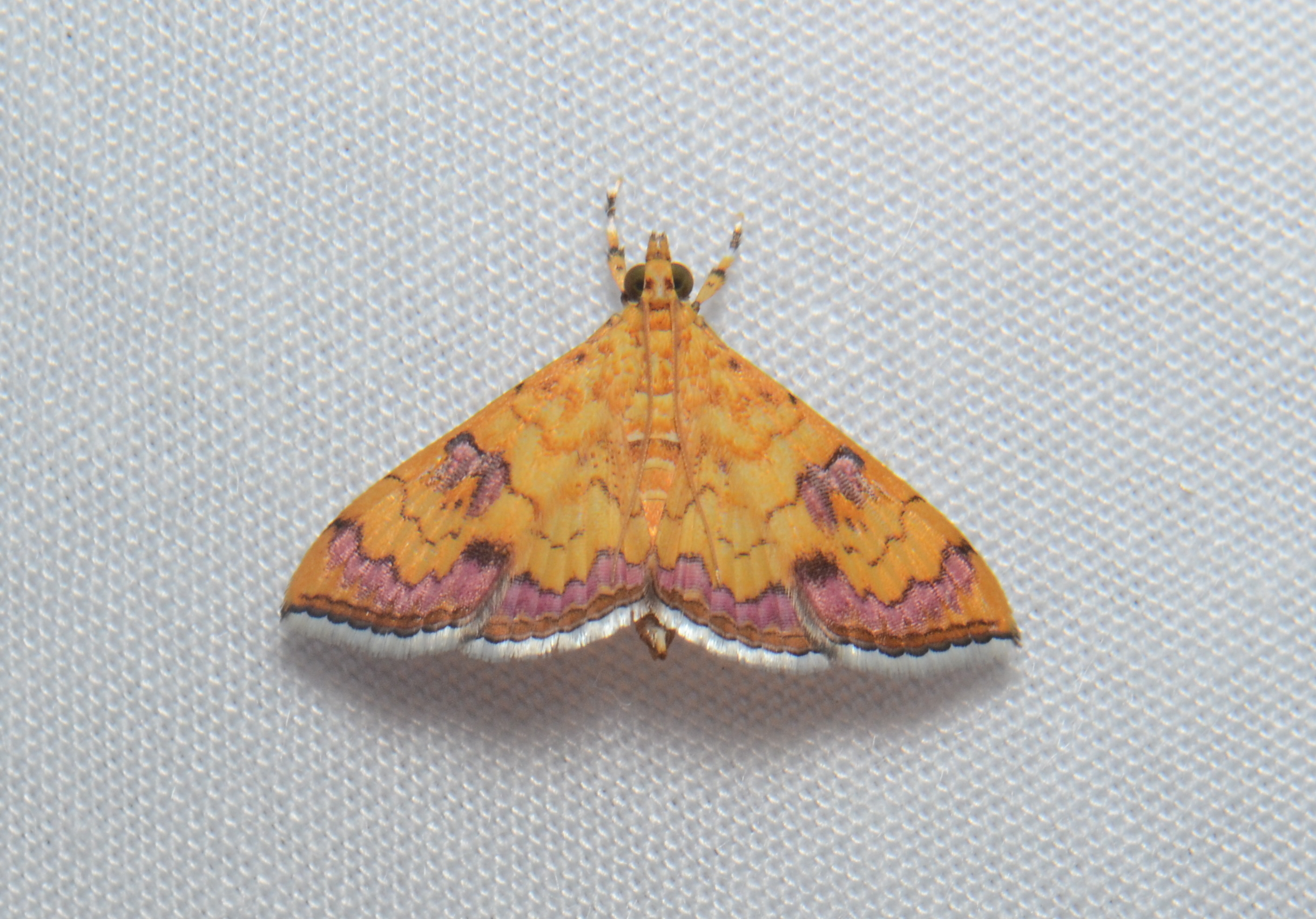
Isocentris filalis

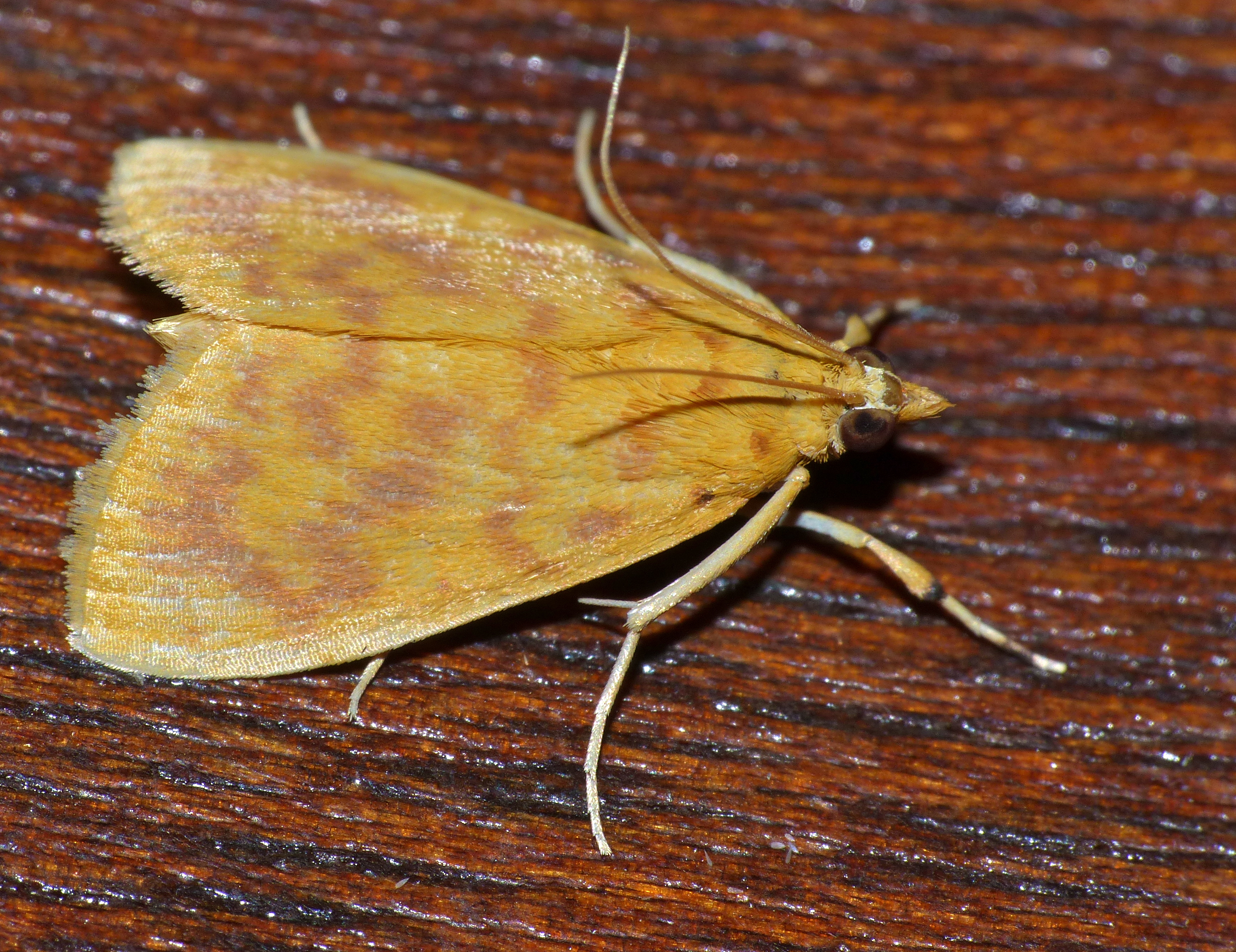
Pioneabathra olesialis

Adult Portentomorphini are relatively small moths with a forewing length of 7.5–9.5 mm (0.30–0.37 in), or a wingspan of 20–29 mm (0.79–1.14 in). The forewing maculation is usually of a yellow colour, but often exhibits a distinctively red or orange postmedial (outer) area. The tribe is characterised by a number of synapomorphies, particularly in the morphology of the genitalia. The male genitalia are rather unique among Pyraustinae and Crambidae in general in having the costa detached from the valva and projecting freely in a dorsal direction, with the apex bearing a field of setae. The valva mostly is reduced to the large, membranous sacculus, which reaches far out and ends in a setose field. A thin and elongate, often articulated fibula of curved shape emerges from the centre of the dorsal valva edge, reaching in a dorsal direction. The narrow uncus without setae is often forked at its tip. In the female genitalia, the appendix bursae, a membranous pouch, emerges at the anterior end of the ductus bursae, close to where it transitions into the corpus bursae; in Pioneabathra, however, it is laterally attached to the corpus bursae. The signum, a sclerotised structure in the corpus bursae, varies in shape among the members of Portentomorphini: a four-armed star in Hyalobathra and Cryptosara, an elongate ovoid sclerite in Portentomorpha, or two large, opposing granulose areas in Pioneabathra and Isocentris filalis.

== Food plants ==
The caterpillars of Portentomorphini primarily feed on plants of the Phyllanthaceae family: Portentomorpha xanthialis feeds on Margaritaria nobilis, species of Hyalobathra are reported from Glochidion and Phyllanthus, Pioneabathra olesialis and Isocentris filalis from Flueggea, and Mabra eryxalis from Phyllanthus urinaria. Several non-Phyllanthaceae hosts are known, such as Euphorbia virosa (Euphorbiaceae) and Sphaeranthus indicus (Asteraceae) for Isocentris, and Abrus precatorius (Fabaceae) and Helianthus annuus (Asteraceae) for Hyalobathra; furthermore, P. olesialis was reported from Solanum (Solanaceae), and Mabra eryxalis from rice (Poaceae).

== Distribution ==
The species of Portentomorphini are distributed in the tropics and subtropics of Australia, Africa and Asia as well as South and Central America; an exception is Hyalobathra intermedialis, which was described from material collected in the Qin Mountains in the Central Chinese Shaanxi province at an elevation of 1,700 m (5,600 ft).

== Systematics ==
The tribe Portentomorphini was described by Hans Georg Amsel in 1956 based on the newly described genus Portentomorpha Amsel, 1956 with its single species P. incalis (Snellen, 1875), which is currently considered a junior synonym of P. xanthialis (Gueneé, 1854).

The tribe was long considered a synonym of Pyraustinae, as the phylogenetic relationships in this group had not been studied. A 2019 study eventually investigated the relationships among Pyraustinae and the related Spilomelinae and found Portentomorpha together with Cryptosara and Hyalobathra to form a monophyletic group, consequently reinstating the name Portentomorphini on the level of a tribe. However, a study from 2022 found Portentomorphini nested within the tribe Pyraustini, rendering the latter tribe paraphyletic.

Portentomorphini currently comprises 44 species in the following six genera:

- Cryptosara E. L. Martin in Marion, 1957 (3 species)
- Hyalobathra Meyrick, 1885 (synonym Leucocraspeda Warren, 1890; 21 species)
- Isocentris Meyrick, 1887 (8 species)
- Mabra Moore, 1885 (synonyms Neurophruda Warren, 1896, Streptobela Turner, 1937; 9 species)
- Pioneabathra J. C. Shaffer & Munroe, 2007 (2 species)
- Portentomorpha Amsel, 1956 (synonym Apoecetes Munroe, 1956; 1 species)
