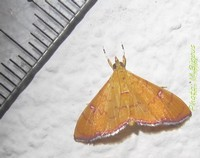

Scientific classification
- Kingdom: Animalia
- Phylum: Arthropoda
- Class: Insecta
- Order: Lepidoptera
- Family: Crambidae
- Subfamily: Pyraustinae
- Genus: Hyalobathra; Meyrick, 1885

Synonyms
- Leucocraspeda Warren, 1890; Isocentris Meyrick, 1887

= Hyalobathra =

Genus of moths

Hyalobathra is a genus of moths of the family Crambidae. The genus was erected by Edward Meyrick in 1885.

== Species ==
- Hyalobathra aequalis (Lederer, 1863)
- Hyalobathra archeleuca Meyrick, 1885
- Hyalobathra barnsalis (Viette, 1957)
- Hyalobathra coenostolalis (Snellen, 1890)
- Hyalobathra crenulata Sutrisno & Horak, 2003
- Hyalobathra dialychna Meyrick, 1894
- Hyalobathra dictatrix Meyrick, 1934
- Hyalobathra illectalis (Walker, 1859)
- Hyalobathra inflammata Hampson, 1913
- Hyalobathra intermedialis Caradja, 1939
- Hyalobathra micralis Caradja, 1932
- Hyalobathra minialis (Warren, 1895)
- Hyalobathra miniosalis (Guenée, 1854)
- Hyalobathra opheltesalis (Walker, 1859)
- Hyalobathra paupellalis (Lederer, 1863)
- Hyalobathra phoenicozona (Hampson, 1896)
- Hyalobathra porphyroxantha (Meyrick, 1936)
- Hyalobathra undulinea (Hampson, 1891)
- Hyalobathra unicolor (Warren, 1895)
- Hyalobathra variabilis J. F. G. Clarke, 1971
- Hyalobathra wilderi Tams, 1935

== Former species ==
- Hyalobathra charopalis Swinhoe, 1907
- Hyalobathra filalis (Guenée, 1854)
- Hyalobathra metallogramma Meyrick, 1934
- Hyalobathra retinalis (Saalmüller, 1880)
- Hyalobathra rubralis Swinhoe, 1906
- Hyalobathra seychellalis (T. B. Fletcher, 1910)
- Hyalobathra veroniqueae Guillermet, 1996
