= Hyalobathra undulinea =

Scientific classification
- Kingdom: Animalia
- Phylum: Arthropoda
- Class: Insecta
- Order: Lepidoptera
- Family: Crambidae
- Genus: Hyalobathra
- Species: H. undulinea

Binomial name
- Hyalobathra undulinea (Hampson, 1891)

Synonyms
- Isocentris undulinea Hampson, 1891

Species of moth

Hyalobathra undulinea is a moth in the family Crambidae. It was described by George Hampson in 1891. It is found in India (Nilgiri) and Taiwan.
