= Hyalobathra micralis =

Scientific classification
- Domain: Eukaryota
- Kingdom: Animalia
- Phylum: Arthropoda
- Class: Insecta
- Order: Lepidoptera
- Family: Crambidae
- Genus: Hyalobathra
- Species: H. micralis

Binomial name
- Hyalobathra micralis Caradja, 1932

Species of moth

Hyalobathra micralis is a moth in the family Crambidae. It was described by Aristide Caradja in 1932. It is found in Fujian, China.
