= Hyalobathra crenulata =

Scientific classification
- Domain: Eukaryota
- Kingdom: Animalia
- Phylum: Arthropoda
- Class: Insecta
- Order: Lepidoptera
- Family: Crambidae
- Genus: Hyalobathra
- Species: H. crenulata

Binomial name
- Hyalobathra crenulata Sutrisno & Horak, 2003

Species of moth

Hyalobathra crenulata is a moth in the family Crambidae. It was described by Hari Sutrisno and Marianne Horak in 2003. It is found in Australia, where it has been recorded from Queensland.

The wings are grey with darker zigzag lines and dark margins.
