= Hyalobathra miniosalis =

Scientific classification
- Kingdom: Animalia
- Phylum: Arthropoda
- Class: Insecta
- Order: Lepidoptera
- Family: Crambidae
- Genus: Hyalobathra
- Species: H. miniosalis

Binomial name
- Hyalobathra miniosalis (Guenée, 1854)

Synonyms
- Ebulea miniosalis Guenée, 1854; Ebulea europsalis Walker, 1859; Ebulea orseisalis Walker, 1859; Hyalobathra rhodoplecta Turner, 1937

Species of moth

Hyalobathra miniosalis is a moth in the family Crambidae. It was described by Achille Guenée in 1854. It is found in India, Indonesia (Java) and Australia, where it has been recorded from Queensland, the Northern Territory and Victoria.

Adults have yellow wings with dark orange zigzag lines.

Larva leaf roll and have been recorded eating Glochidion sp.
