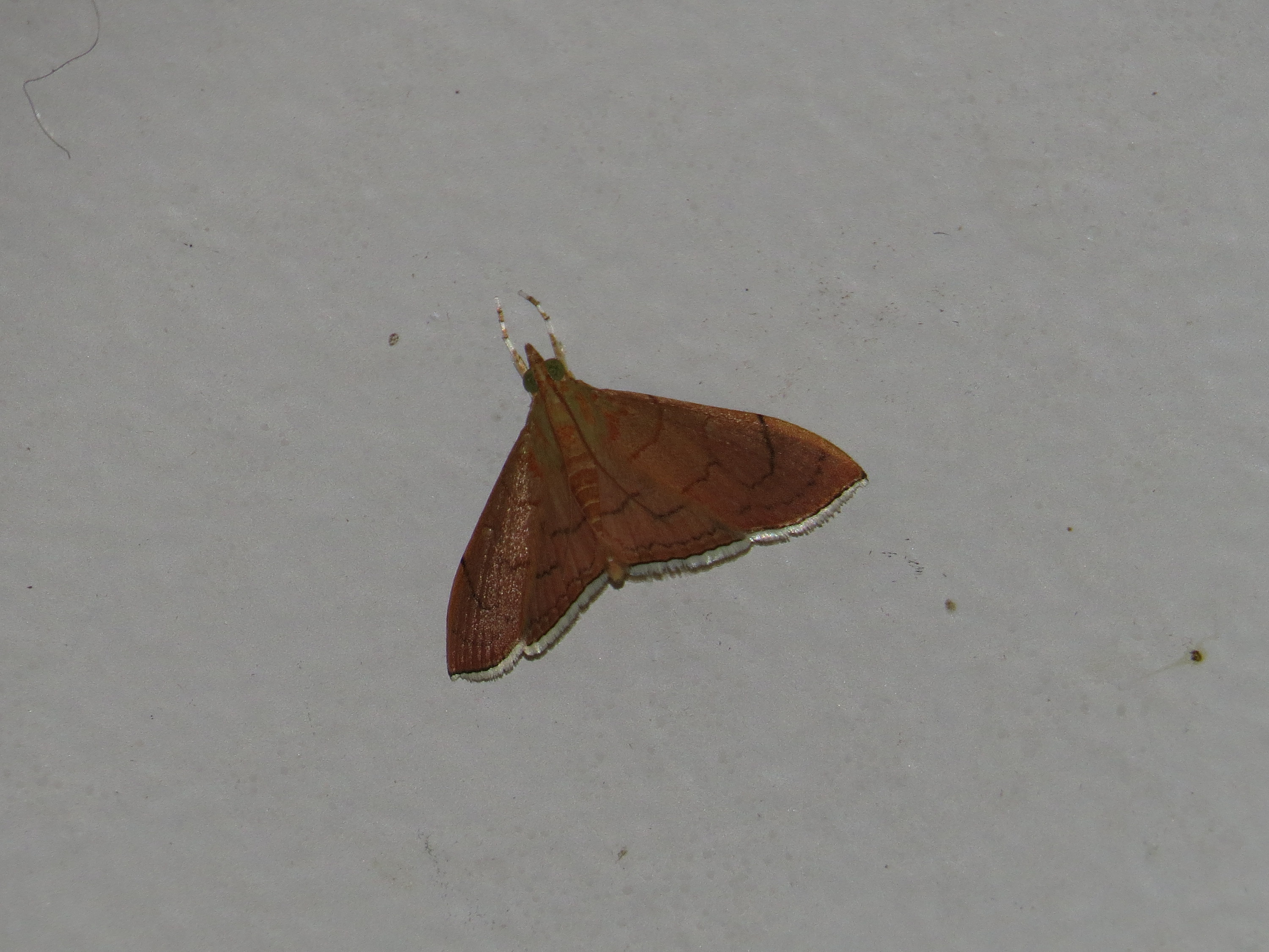
- Hyalobathra illectalis Walker, 1859, to actinic light, Clump Point, Mission Beach, QLD, November 2014

Scientific classification
- Kingdom: Animalia
- Phylum: Arthropoda
- Class: Insecta
- Order: Lepidoptera
- Family: Crambidae
- Genus: Hyalobathra
- Species: H. illectalis

Binomial name
- Hyalobathra illectalis (Walker, 1859)

Synonyms
- Botys illectalis Walker, 1859; Botys albofimbrialis Snellen, 1883; Botys niveicilialis Snellen, 1880

= Hyalobathra illectalis =

Species of moth

Hyalobathra illectalis is a moth in the family Crambidae. It was described by Francis Walker in 1859. It is found in Sri Lanka and Indonesia (Sumatra, Sulawesi).
