= Mabra =

Scientific classification
- Domain: Eukaryota
- Kingdom: Animalia
- Phylum: Arthropoda
- Class: Insecta
- Order: Lepidoptera
- Family: Crambidae
- Subfamily: Pyraustinae
- Genus: Mabra; Moore, 1885

Synonyms
- Streptobela Turner, 1937

Genus of moths

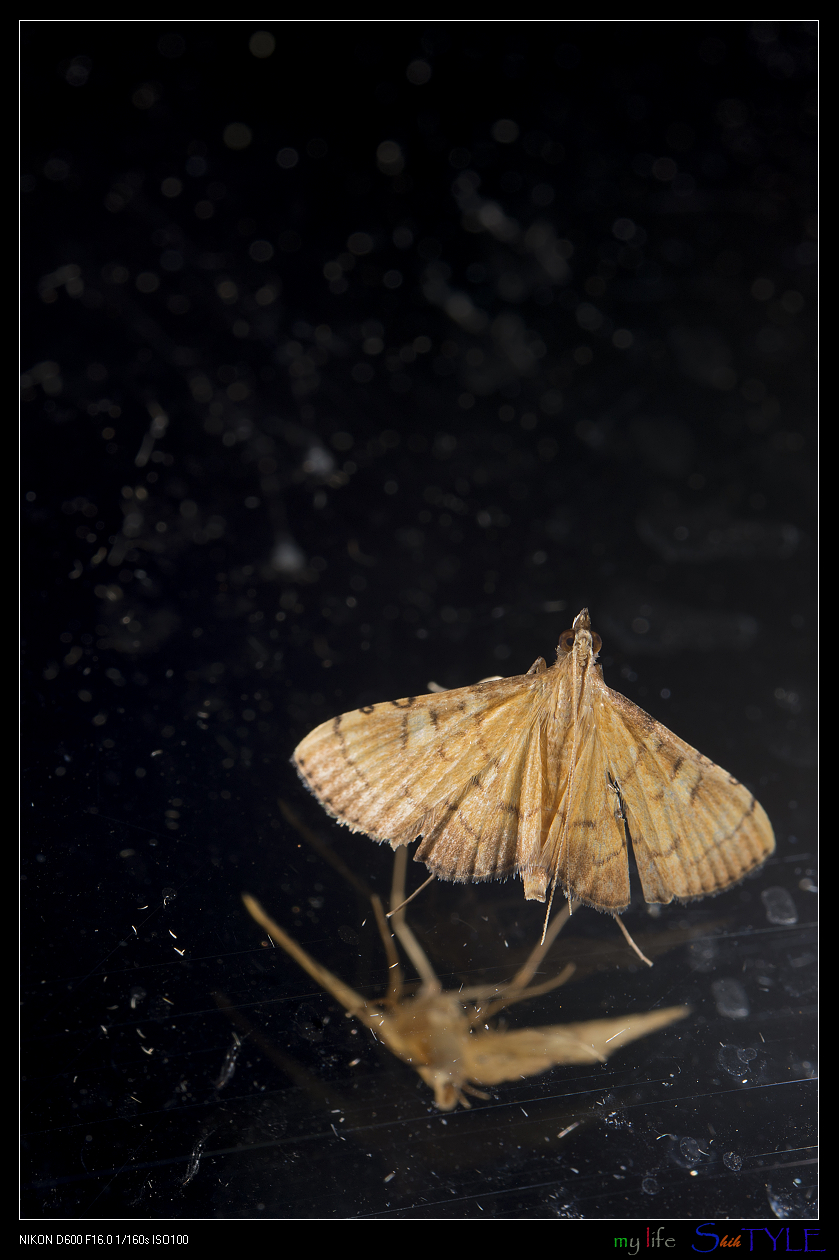
Mabra charonialis

Mabra is a genus of moths of the family Crambidae. It is placed in the tribe Portentomorphini of the subfamily Pyraustinae. The nine species of the genus are mainly distributed in tropical Asia, but M. metallescens and M. russoi are found in tropical Central and South America.

The larval host plant is known for only one species, M. eryxalis, which feeds on Phyllanthus urinaria in the Phyllanthaceae family.

== Species ==
- Mabra elephantophila Bänziger, 1985
- Mabra eryxalis (Walker, 1859)
- Mabra fauculalis Walker, 1859
- Mabra fuscipennalis Hampson, 1897
- Mabra haematophaga Bänziger, 1985
- Mabra lacriphaga Bänziger, 1985
- Mabra metallescens (C. Felder, R. Felder & Rogenhofer, 1875)
- Mabra nigriscripta Swinhoe, 1895
- Mabra russoi Schaus, 1940

== Former species ==
- Mabra charonialis (Walker, 1859), now placed in Dolicharthria
- Mabra garzettalis (C. Felder, R. Felder & Rogenhofer, 1875), now placed in Blepharomastix
