= Isocentris minimalis =

Scientific classification
- Domain: Eukaryota
- Kingdom: Animalia
- Phylum: Arthropoda
- Class: Insecta
- Order: Lepidoptera
- Family: Crambidae
- Genus: Isocentris
- Species: I. minimalis

Binomial name
- Isocentris minimalis C. Swinhoe, 1906

Species of moth

Isocentris minimalis is a moth in the family Crambidae. It was described by Charles Swinhoe in 1906. It is found on Borneo.
