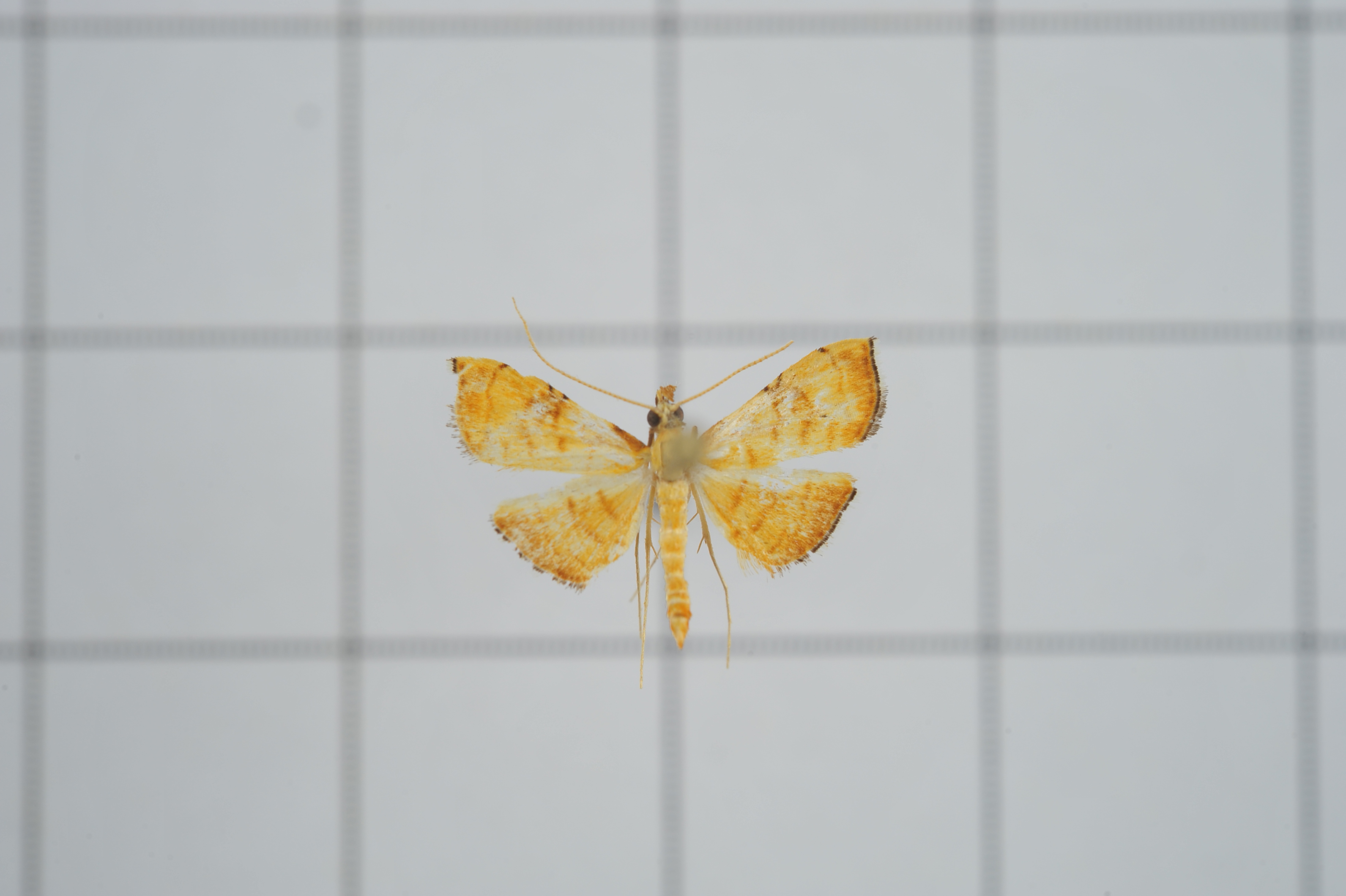

Scientific classification
- Domain: Eukaryota
- Kingdom: Animalia
- Phylum: Arthropoda
- Class: Insecta
- Order: Lepidoptera
- Family: Crambidae
- Genus: Mabra
- Species: M. nigriscripta

Binomial name
- Mabra nigriscripta C. Swinhoe, 1895

= Mabra nigriscripta =

Species of moth

Mabra nigriscripta is a moth in the family Crambidae. It was described by Charles Swinhoe in 1895. It is found in India.
