= Hyalobathra unicolor =

Scientific classification
- Kingdom: Animalia
- Phylum: Arthropoda
- Class: Insecta
- Order: Lepidoptera
- Family: Crambidae
- Genus: Hyalobathra
- Species: H. unicolor

Binomial name
- Hyalobathra unicolor (Warren, 1895)

Synonyms
- Isocentris unicolor Warren, 1895

Species of moth

Hyalobathra unicolor, the cotton web spinner, is a moth in the family Crambidae. It was described by William Warren in 1895. It is found in coastal north-eastern Australia, including Queensland.

The wingspan is about 20 mm. The forewings are fawn with faint dark zigzag lines and narrow black margins.

They live in groups in a silken shelter, made amongst the leaves of the host plant. The larvae have a brown body and a brown head with rusty markings. It grows to a length of about 20 mm. Pupation takes place in the shelter.
