= Hyalobathra minialis =

Scientific classification
- Domain: Eukaryota
- Kingdom: Animalia
- Phylum: Arthropoda
- Class: Insecta
- Order: Lepidoptera
- Family: Crambidae
- Genus: Hyalobathra
- Species: H. minialis

Binomial name
- Hyalobathra minialis (Warren, 1895)

Synonyms
- Pachybotys minialis Warren, 1895

Species of moth

Hyalobathra minialis is a moth in the family Crambidae. It was described by Warren in 1895. It is found in Australia, where it has been recorded from Queensland.

The wingspan is about 25 mm. The forewings are orange with red zig-zag lines.
