= Hyalobathra barnsalis =

Scientific classification
- Domain: Eukaryota
- Kingdom: Animalia
- Phylum: Arthropoda
- Class: Insecta
- Order: Lepidoptera
- Family: Crambidae
- Genus: Hyalobathra
- Species: H. barnsalis

Binomial name
- Hyalobathra barnsalis (Viette, 1957)
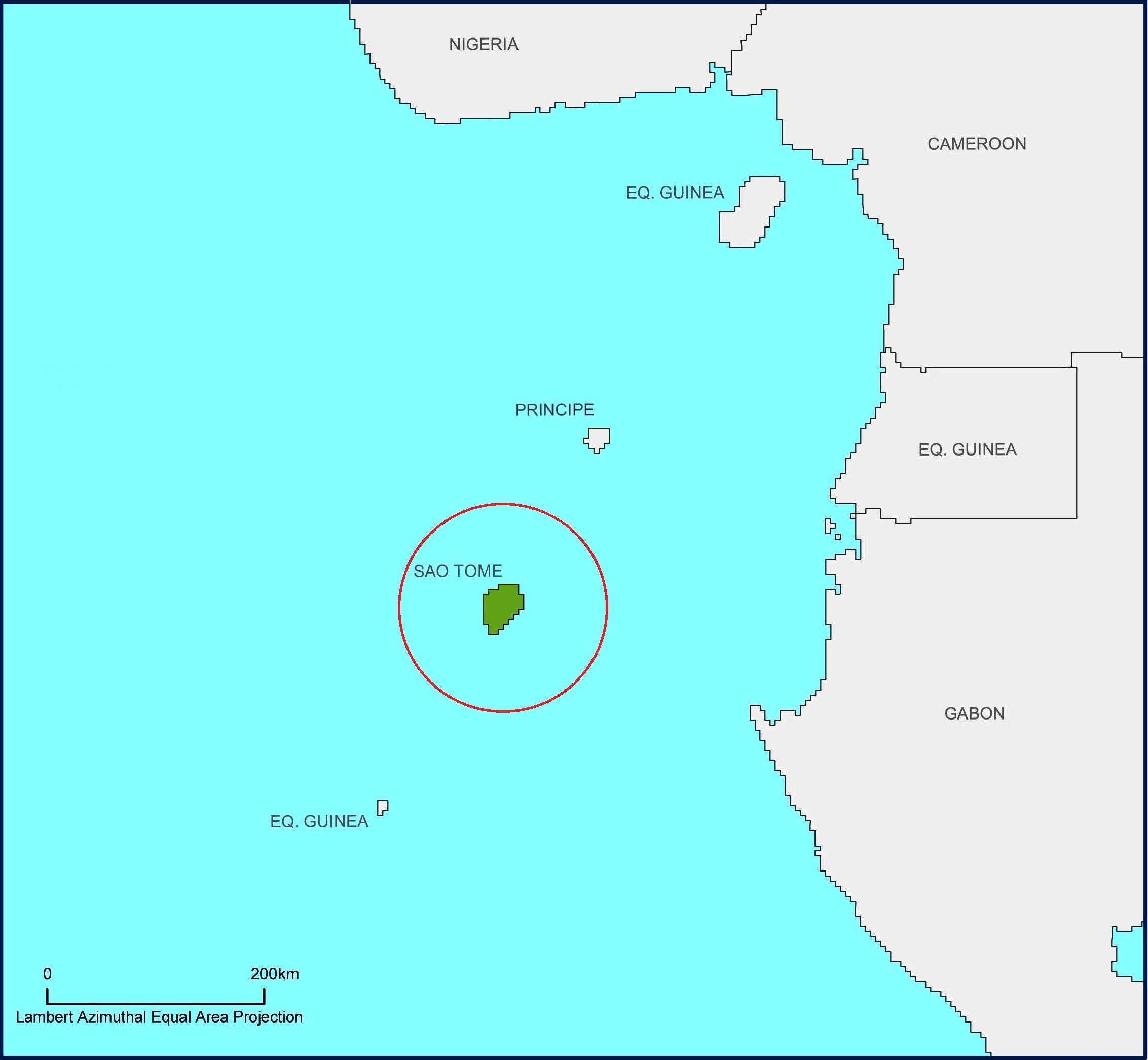
- range

Synonyms
- Isocentris barnsalis Viette, 1957

Species of moth

Hyalobathra barnsalis is a moth in the family Crambidae. It was described by Pierre Viette in 1957. Its type locality is Bombaim. It is found on the island of São Tomé in São Tomé and Príncipe.
