= Cryptosara auralis =

Scientific classification
- Kingdom: Animalia
- Phylum: Arthropoda
- Class: Insecta
- Order: Lepidoptera
- Family: Crambidae
- Genus: Cryptosara
- Species: C. auralis

Binomial name
- Cryptosara auralis (Snellen, 1872)

Synonyms
- Botys auralis Snellen, 1872; Cryptosara aurata

Species of moth

Cryptosara auralis is a moth in the family Crambidae. It was described by Snellen in 1872. It is found in the Democratic Republic of Congo.
