= Mabra fuscipennalis =

Scientific classification
- Kingdom: Animalia
- Phylum: Arthropoda
- Class: Insecta
- Order: Lepidoptera
- Family: Crambidae
- Genus: Mabra
- Species: M. fuscipennalis

Binomial name
- Mabra fuscipennalis Hampson, 1897

Species of moth

Mabra fuscipennalis is a moth in the family Crambidae. It was described by George Hampson in 1897. It is found in the Khasi Hills of India.
