= Hyalobathra paupellalis =

Scientific classification
- Domain: Eukaryota
- Kingdom: Animalia
- Phylum: Arthropoda
- Class: Insecta
- Order: Lepidoptera
- Family: Crambidae
- Genus: Hyalobathra
- Species: H. paupellalis

Binomial name
- Hyalobathra paupellalis (Lederer, 1863)

Synonyms
- Botys paupellalis Lederer, 1863

Species of moth

Hyalobathra paupellalis is a moth in the family Crambidae. It was described by Julius Lederer in 1863. It is found in south-east Asia.
