= Isocentris thomealis =

Scientific classification
- Kingdom: Animalia
- Phylum: Arthropoda
- Class: Insecta
- Order: Lepidoptera
- Family: Crambidae
- Genus: Isocentris
- Species: I. thomealis

Binomial name
- Isocentris thomealis (Viette, 1957)

Species of moth

Isocentris thomealis is a species of moth in the family Crambidae. It was described by Viette in 1957. It is endemic to São Tomé. It was described in the same year as Syllepte thomealis.
