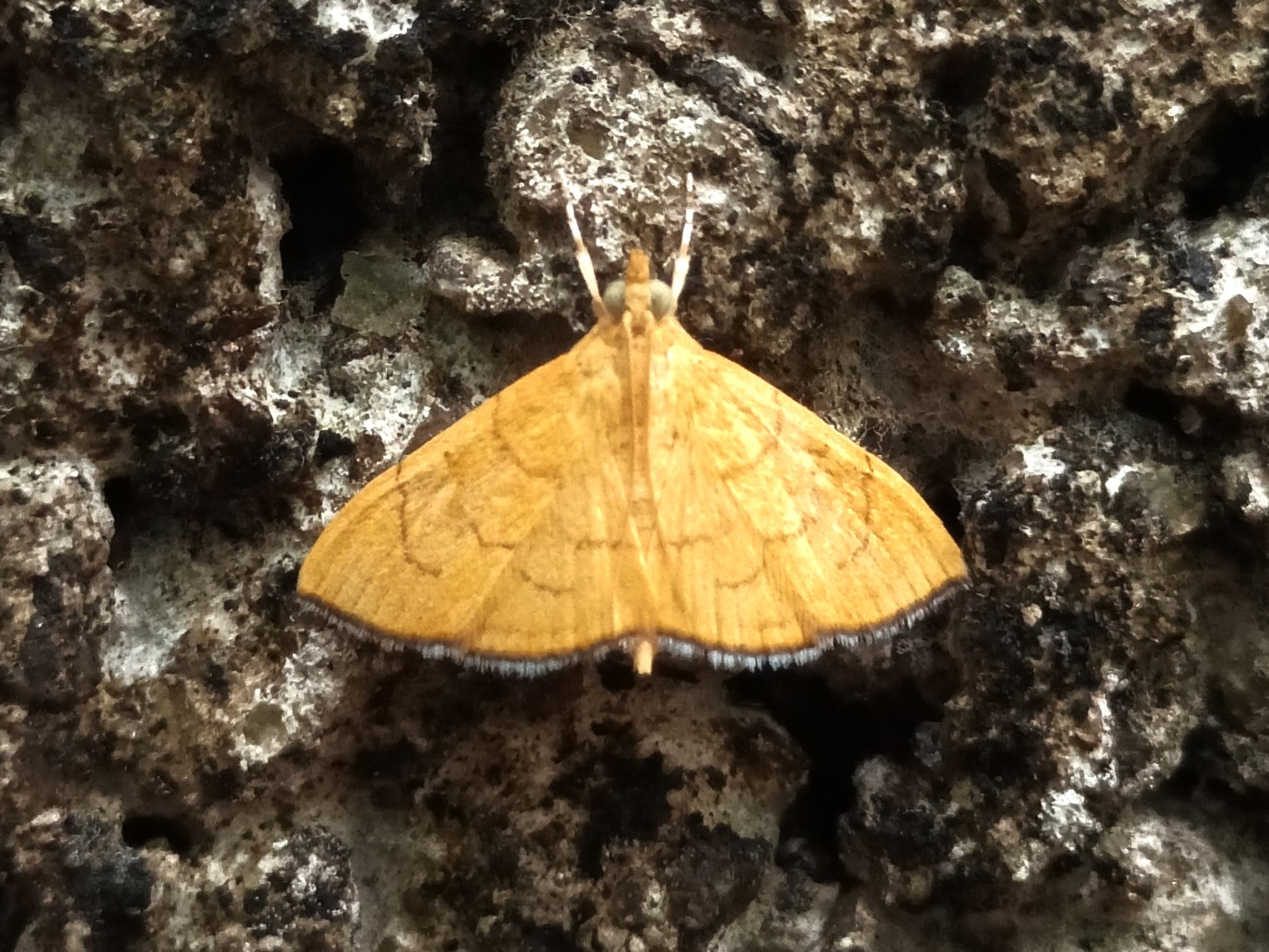

Scientific classification
- Kingdom: Animalia
- Phylum: Arthropoda
- Class: Insecta
- Order: Lepidoptera
- Family: Crambidae
- Genus: Hyalobathra
- Species: H. opheltesalis

Binomial name
- Hyalobathra opheltesalis (Walker, 1859)

Synonyms
- Ebulea opheltesalis Walker, 1859

= Hyalobathra opheltesalis =

Species of moth

Hyalobathra opheltesalis is a moth in the family Crambidae. It was described by Francis Walker in 1859. It is found in India.
