= Cryptosara caritalis =

Scientific classification
- Kingdom: Animalia
- Phylum: Arthropoda
- Class: Insecta
- Order: Lepidoptera
- Family: Crambidae
- Genus: Cryptosara
- Species: C. caritalis

Binomial name
- Cryptosara caritalis (Walker, 1859)

Synonyms
- Scopula caritalis Walker, 1859

Species of moth

Cryptosara caritalis is a moth in the family Crambidae. It was described by Francis Walker in 1859. It is found in Cameroon, the Republic of Congo, the Democratic Republic of Congo, Mauritius, Sierra Leone and Togo.
