= Portentomorpha =

Scientific classification
- Kingdom: Animalia
- Phylum: Arthropoda
- Class: Insecta
- Order: Lepidoptera
- Family: Crambidae
- Subfamily: Pyraustinae
- Genus: Portentomorpha; Amsel, 1956
- Species: P. xanthialis

Binomial name
- Portentomorpha xanthialis (Guenée, 1854)

Synonyms
- Apoecetes Munroe, 1956; Botys xanthialis Guenée, 1854; Apoecetes xanthialis; Botys incalis Snellen, 1875; Botys incalis var. rosealis Möschler, 1890; Botys superbalis Walker, 1866

Genus of moths

Portentomorpha is a genus of moths of the family Crambidae. It contains only one species, Portentomorpha xanthialis, which is found from Texas to Louisiana and Florida, the West Indies (including Cuba, Puerto Rico) and from Mexico to Bolivia (including Colombia and Ecuador).

The wingspan is 24–27 mm. Adults have been recorded on wing in August in Florida.

Portentomorpha is the type genus of the tribe Portentomorphini, established by Hans Georg Amsel in 1956.
