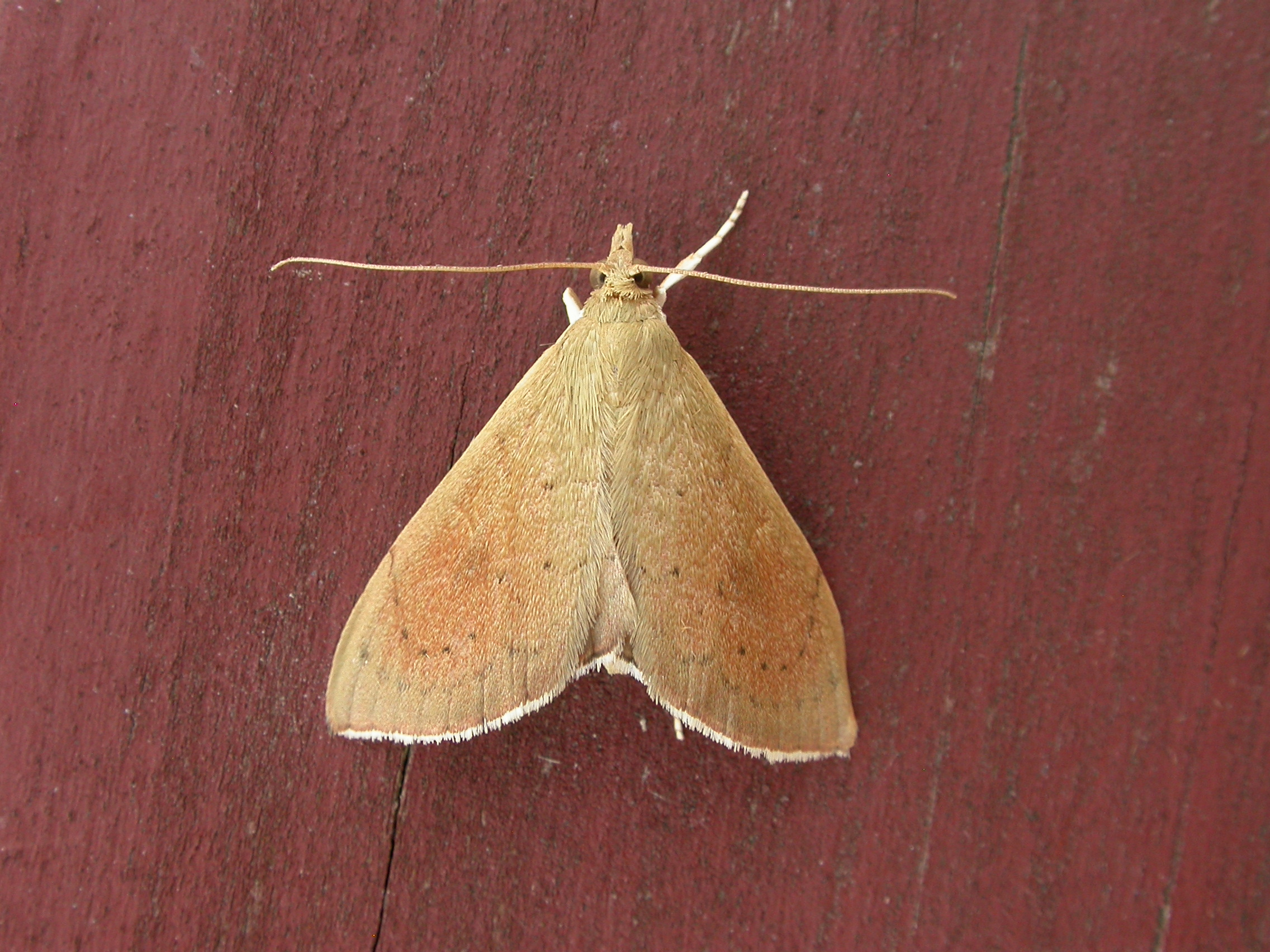
- From Burrill Lake, New South Wales, Australia

Scientific classification
- Kingdom: Animalia
- Phylum: Arthropoda
- Clade: Pancrustacea
- Class: Insecta
- Order: Lepidoptera
- Family: Crambidae
- Genus: Hyalobathra
- Species: H. archeleuca

Binomial name
- Hyalobathra archeleuca Meyrick, 1885

= Hyalobathra archeleuca =

Species of moth

Hyalobathra archeleuca is a moth in the family Crambidaewhich was described by Edward Meyrick in 1885. It is found in Australia, where it has been recorded from New South Wales and Queensland.
