= Mabra haematophaga =

Scientific classification
- Domain: Eukaryota
- Kingdom: Animalia
- Phylum: Arthropoda
- Class: Insecta
- Order: Lepidoptera
- Family: Crambidae
- Genus: Mabra
- Species: M. haematophaga

Binomial name
- Mabra haematophaga Bänziger, 1985

Species of moth

Mabra haematophaga is a moth in the family Crambidae. It was described by Hans Bänziger in 1985. It is found in Thailand.
