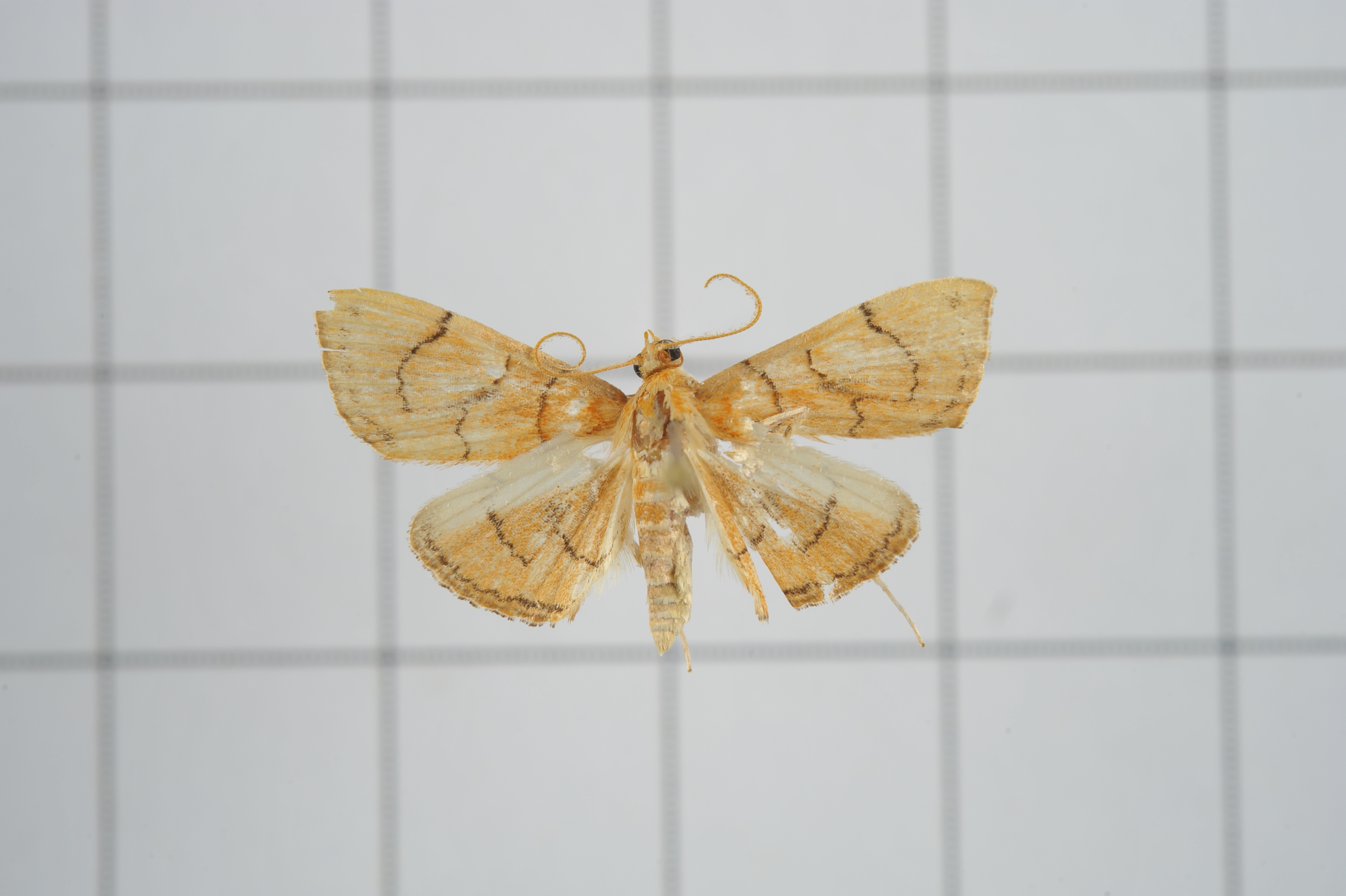

Scientific classification
- Kingdom: Animalia
- Phylum: Arthropoda
- Class: Insecta
- Order: Lepidoptera
- Family: Crambidae
- Genus: Hyalobathra
- Species: H. coenostolalis

Binomial name
- Hyalobathra coenostolalis (Snellen, 1890)

Synonyms
- Botys coenostolalis Snellen, 1890; Leucocraspeda udeoides Hampson, 1891

= Hyalobathra coenostolalis =

Species of moth

Hyalobathra coenostolalis is a moth in the family Crambidae. It was described by Snellen in 1890. It is found in India (Sikkim, Nilgiri) and on Java.
