= Hyalobathra dictatrix =

Scientific classification
- Kingdom: Animalia
- Phylum: Arthropoda
- Class: Insecta
- Order: Lepidoptera
- Family: Crambidae
- Genus: Hyalobathra
- Species: H. dictatrix

Binomial name
- Hyalobathra dictatrix Meyrick, 1934

Species of moth

Hyalobathra dictatrix is a moth in the family Crambidae. It was described by Edward Meyrick in 1934. It is found in Madagascar, the Comoros and the Democratic Republic of the Congo.
