= Hyalobathra variabilis =

Scientific classification
- Domain: Eukaryota
- Kingdom: Animalia
- Phylum: Arthropoda
- Class: Insecta
- Order: Lepidoptera
- Family: Crambidae
- Genus: Hyalobathra
- Species: H. variabilis

Binomial name
- Hyalobathra variabilis J. F. G. Clarke, 1971

Species of moth

Hyalobathra variabilis is a moth in the family Crambidae. It was described by John Frederick Gates Clarke in 1971. It is found in Rapa Iti, French Polynesia.
