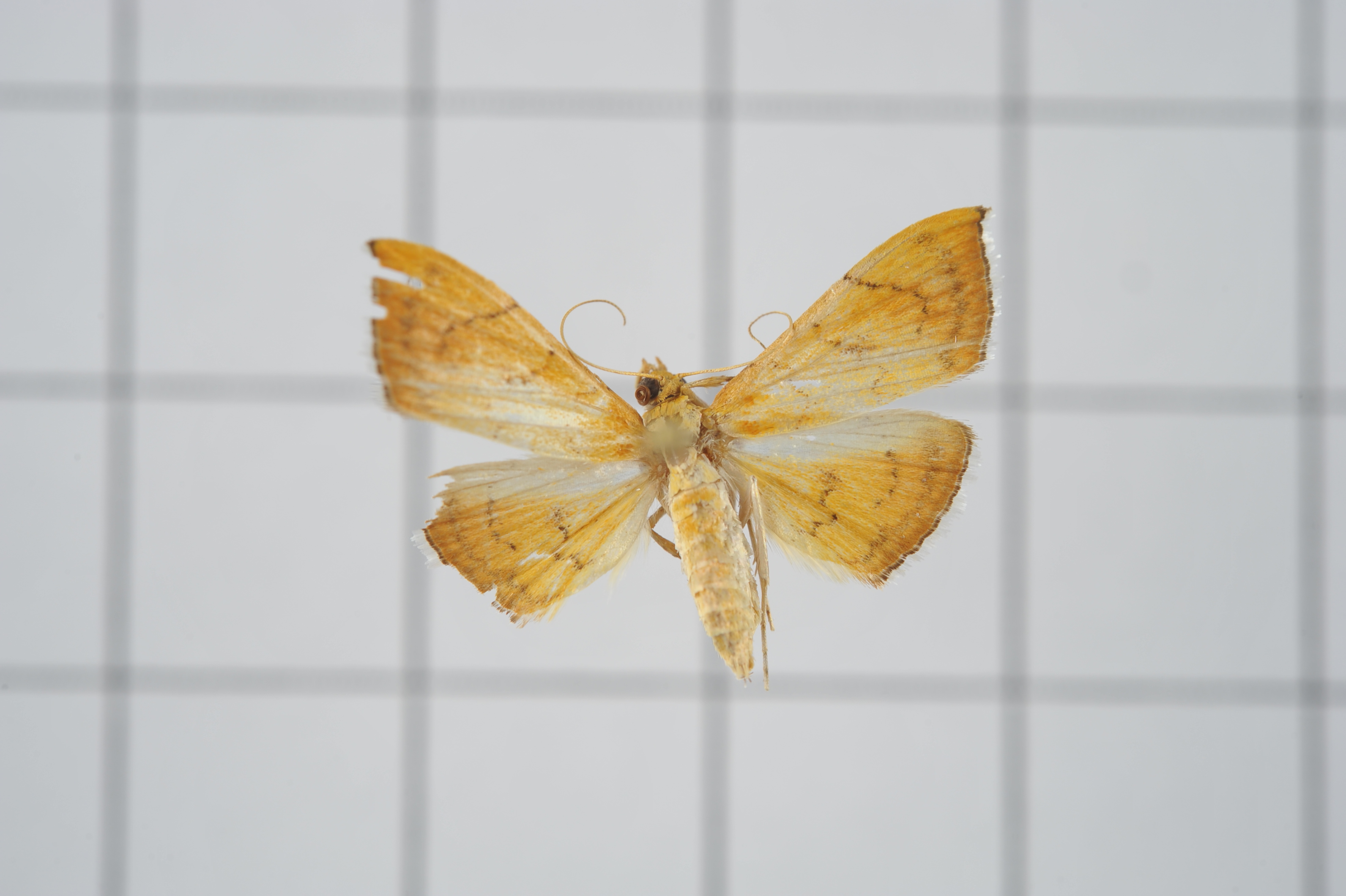

Scientific classification
- Kingdom: Animalia
- Phylum: Arthropoda
- Class: Insecta
- Order: Lepidoptera
- Family: Crambidae
- Genus: Hyalobathra
- Species: H. dialychna

Binomial name
- Hyalobathra dialychna Meyrick, 1894

= Hyalobathra dialychna =

Species of moth

Hyalobathra dialychna is a moth in the family Crambidae. It was described by Edward Meyrick in 1894. It is found in northern Myanmar.
