= Hyalobathra inflammata =

Scientific classification
- Kingdom: Animalia
- Phylum: Arthropoda
- Class: Insecta
- Order: Lepidoptera
- Family: Crambidae
- Genus: Hyalobathra
- Species: H. inflammata

Binomial name
- Hyalobathra inflammata Hampson, 1913

Species of moth

Hyalobathra inflammata is a moth in the family Crambidae. It was described by George Hampson in 1913. It is found on Yapen, Indonesia.
