= Mabra elephantophila =

Scientific classification
- Domain: Eukaryota
- Kingdom: Animalia
- Phylum: Arthropoda
- Class: Insecta
- Order: Lepidoptera
- Family: Crambidae
- Genus: Mabra
- Species: M. elephantophila

Binomial name
- Mabra elephantophila Bänziger, 1985

Species of moth

Mabra elephantophila is a moth of the family Crambidae. It is found in Thailand.

Adults feed on the tears of elephants. If the animal is not producing tears, the moth will irritate the eye, causing tears to be produced.
