= Dolicharthria charonialis =

Scientific classification
- Kingdom: Animalia
- Phylum: Arthropoda
- Class: Insecta
- Order: Lepidoptera
- Family: Crambidae
- Genus: Dolicharthria
- Species: D. charonialis

Binomial name
- Dolicharthria charonialis (Walker, 1859)

Synonyms
- Asopia charonialis Walker, 1859

Species of moth

Dolicharthria charonialis is a moth in the family Crambidae. It was described by Francis Walker in 1859. It is found in China. It was previously placed in the Pyraustinae genus Mabra.
