= Hyalobathra porphyroxantha =

Scientific classification
- Kingdom: Animalia
- Phylum: Arthropoda
- Class: Insecta
- Order: Lepidoptera
- Family: Crambidae
- Genus: Hyalobathra
- Species: H. porphyroxantha

Binomial name
- Hyalobathra porphyroxantha (Meyrick, 1936)

Synonyms
- Isocentris porphyroxantha Meyrick, 1936

Species of moth

Hyalobathra porphyroxantha is a moth in the family Crambidae. It was described by Edward Meyrick in 1936. It is found in Rwanda.
