= Mabra fauculalis =

Scientific classification
- Kingdom: Animalia
- Phylum: Arthropoda
- Class: Insecta
- Order: Lepidoptera
- Family: Crambidae
- Genus: Mabra
- Species: M. fauculalis

Binomial name
- Mabra fauculalis Walker, 1859

Species of moth

Mabra fauculalis is a moth in the family Crambidae. It was described by Francis Walker in 1859. It is found on Borneo.
