= Mabra russoi =

Scientific classification
- Domain: Eukaryota
- Kingdom: Animalia
- Phylum: Arthropoda
- Class: Insecta
- Order: Lepidoptera
- Family: Crambidae
- Genus: Mabra
- Species: M. russoi

Binomial name
- Mabra russoi Schaus, 1940

Species of moth

Mabra russoi is a moth in the family Crambidae. It is found in the Dominican Republic.
