= Cryptosara vadonalis =

Scientific classification
- Domain: Eukaryota
- Kingdom: Animalia
- Phylum: Arthropoda
- Class: Insecta
- Order: Lepidoptera
- Family: Crambidae
- Genus: Cryptosara
- Species: C. vadonalis

Binomial name
- Cryptosara vadonalis Marion, 1956

Species of moth

Cryptosara vadonalis is a moth in the family Crambidae. It was described by Hubert Marion in 1956. It is found on Madagascar.
