= Mabra metallescens =

Scientific classification
- Domain: Eukaryota
- Kingdom: Animalia
- Phylum: Arthropoda
- Class: Insecta
- Order: Lepidoptera
- Family: Crambidae
- Genus: Mabra
- Species: M. metallescens

Binomial name
- Mabra metallescens (C. Felder, R. Felder & Rogenhofer, 1875)

Synonyms
- Botys metallescens C. Felder, R. Felder & Rogenhofer, 1875

Species of moth

Mabra metallescens is a moth in the family Crambidae. It is found in Colombia.
