= Hyalobathra intermedialis =

Scientific classification
- Domain: Eukaryota
- Kingdom: Animalia
- Phylum: Arthropoda
- Class: Insecta
- Order: Lepidoptera
- Family: Crambidae
- Genus: Hyalobathra
- Species: H. intermedialis

Binomial name
- Hyalobathra intermedialis Caradja, 1939

Species of moth

Hyalobathra intermedialis is a moth in the family Crambidae. It was described by Aristide Caradja in 1939. It is found in Shaanxi, China.
