= Isocentris rubralis =

Scientific classification
- Domain: Eukaryota
- Kingdom: Animalia
- Phylum: Arthropoda
- Class: Insecta
- Order: Lepidoptera
- Family: Crambidae
- Genus: Isocentris
- Species: I. rubralis

Binomial name
- Isocentris rubralis Swinhoe, 1906

Synonyms
- Hyalobathra rubralis

Species of moth

Isocentris rubralis is a moth in the family Crambidae. It was described by Charles Swinhoe in 1906. It is found in India (Khasia Hills).
