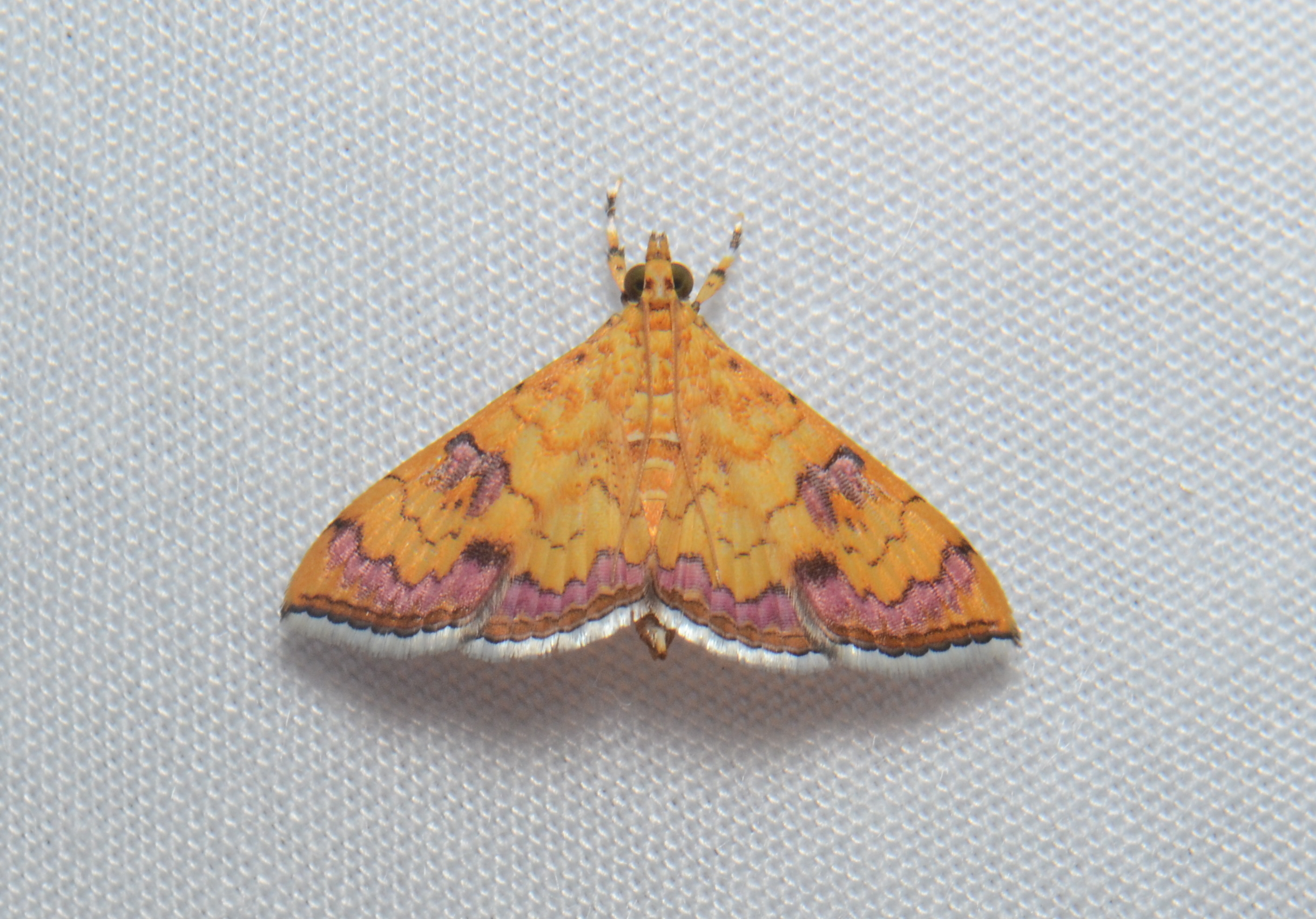

Scientific classification
- Domain: Eukaryota
- Kingdom: Animalia
- Phylum: Arthropoda
- Class: Insecta
- Order: Lepidoptera
- Family: Crambidae
- Subfamily: Pyraustinae
- Genus: Isocentris; Meyrick, 1887

= Isocentris =

Genus of moths

Isocentris is a genus of moths of the family Crambidae described by Edward Meyrick in 1887.

== Species ==
- Isocentris charopalis Swinhoe, 1907
- Isocentris filalis (Guenée, 1854)
- Isocentris minimalis Swinhoe, 1906
- Isocentris rubralis Swinhoe, 1906
- Isocentris seychellalis T. B. Fletcher, 1910

== Former species ==
- Isocentris retinalis (Saalmüller, 1880)
- Isocentris thomealis Viette, 1957
