= Cryptosara =

Scientific classification
- Domain: Eukaryota
- Kingdom: Animalia
- Phylum: Arthropoda
- Class: Insecta
- Order: Lepidoptera
- Family: Crambidae
- Subfamily: Pyraustinae
- Genus: Cryptosara; E. L. Martin, 1956

Genus of moths

Cryptosara is a genus of moths of the family Crambidae.

== Species ==
- Cryptosara auralis (Snellen, 1872)
- Cryptosara caritalis (Walker, 1859)
- Cryptosara vadonalis Marion, 1956
