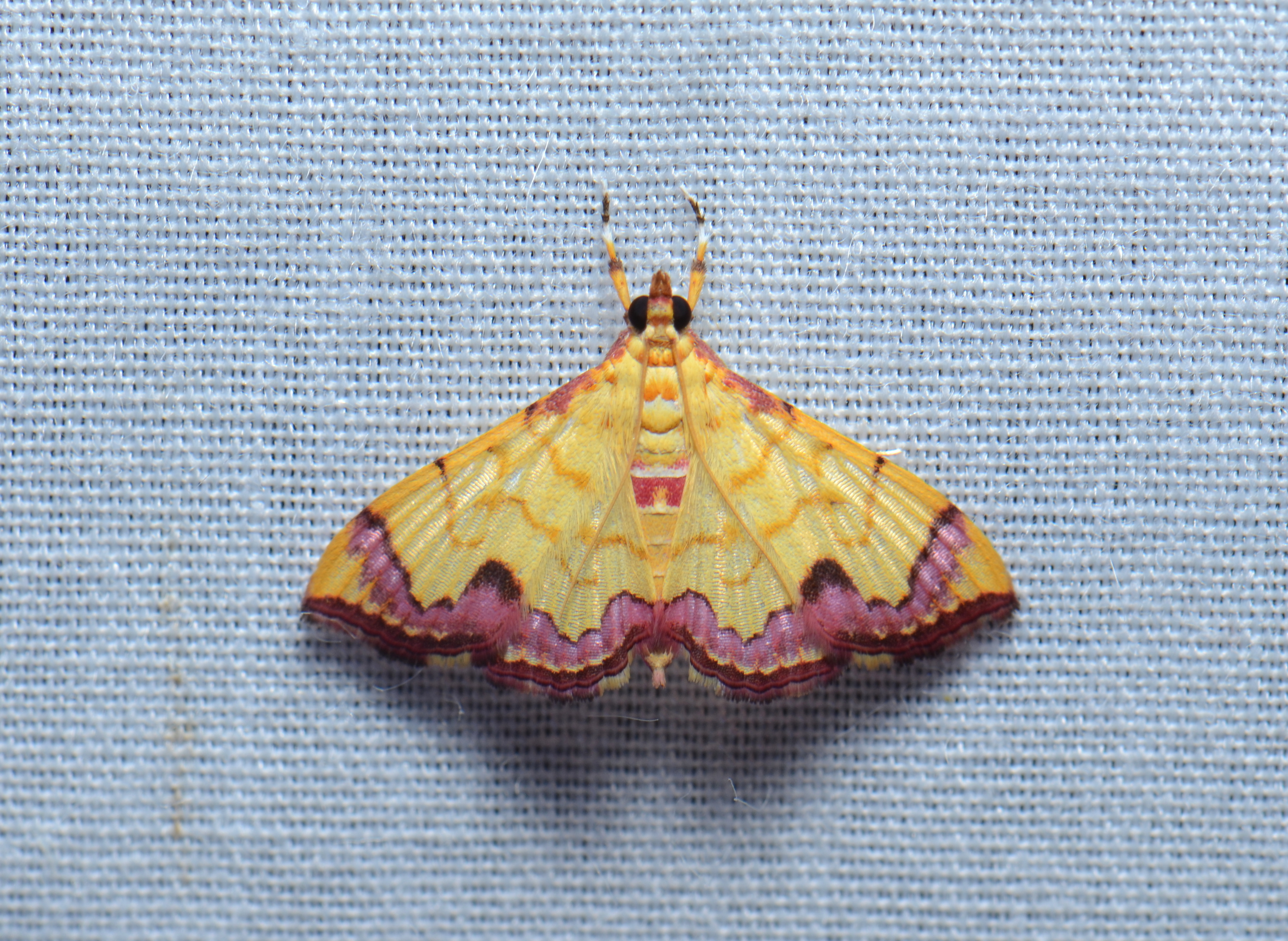

Scientific classification
- Kingdom: Animalia
- Phylum: Arthropoda
- Class: Insecta
- Order: Lepidoptera
- Family: Crambidae
- Genus: Hyalobathra
- Species: H. phoenicozona

Binomial name
- Hyalobathra phoenicozona (Hampson, 1896)

Synonyms
- Isocentris phoenicozona Hampson, 1896

= Hyalobathra phoenicozona =

Species of moth

Hyalobathra phoenicozona is a moth in the family Crambidae. It was described by George Hampson in 1896. It is found in northern India.
