= Isocentris seychellalis =

Scientific classification
- Domain: Eukaryota
- Kingdom: Animalia
- Phylum: Arthropoda
- Class: Insecta
- Order: Lepidoptera
- Family: Crambidae
- Genus: Isocentris
- Species: I. seychellalis

Binomial name
- Isocentris seychellalis T. B. Fletcher, 1910

Synonyms
- Hyalobathra seychellalis

Species of moth

Isocentris seychellalis is a moth in the family Crambidae. It was described by Thomas Bainbrigge Fletcher in 1910. It is found on the Seychelles.
