= Mabra eryxalis =

Scientific classification
- Kingdom: Animalia
- Phylum: Arthropoda
- Class: Insecta
- Order: Lepidoptera
- Family: Crambidae
- Genus: Mabra
- Species: M. eryxalis

Binomial name
- Mabra eryxalis (Walker, 1859)

Synonyms
- Asopia eryxalis Walker, 1859; Botys velatalis Snellen, 1880; Streptobela crocobaphes Turner, 1937

Species of moth

Mabra eryxalis is a moth in the family Crambidae. It was described by Francis Walker in 1859. It is found on the Chagos Archipelago and Sumatra, as well as in China, Taiwan, Mayotte, Réunion, Sri Lanka and Australia, where it has been recorded from Queensland.

The forewings are yellow with several dark lines, as well as a dark smudge.
