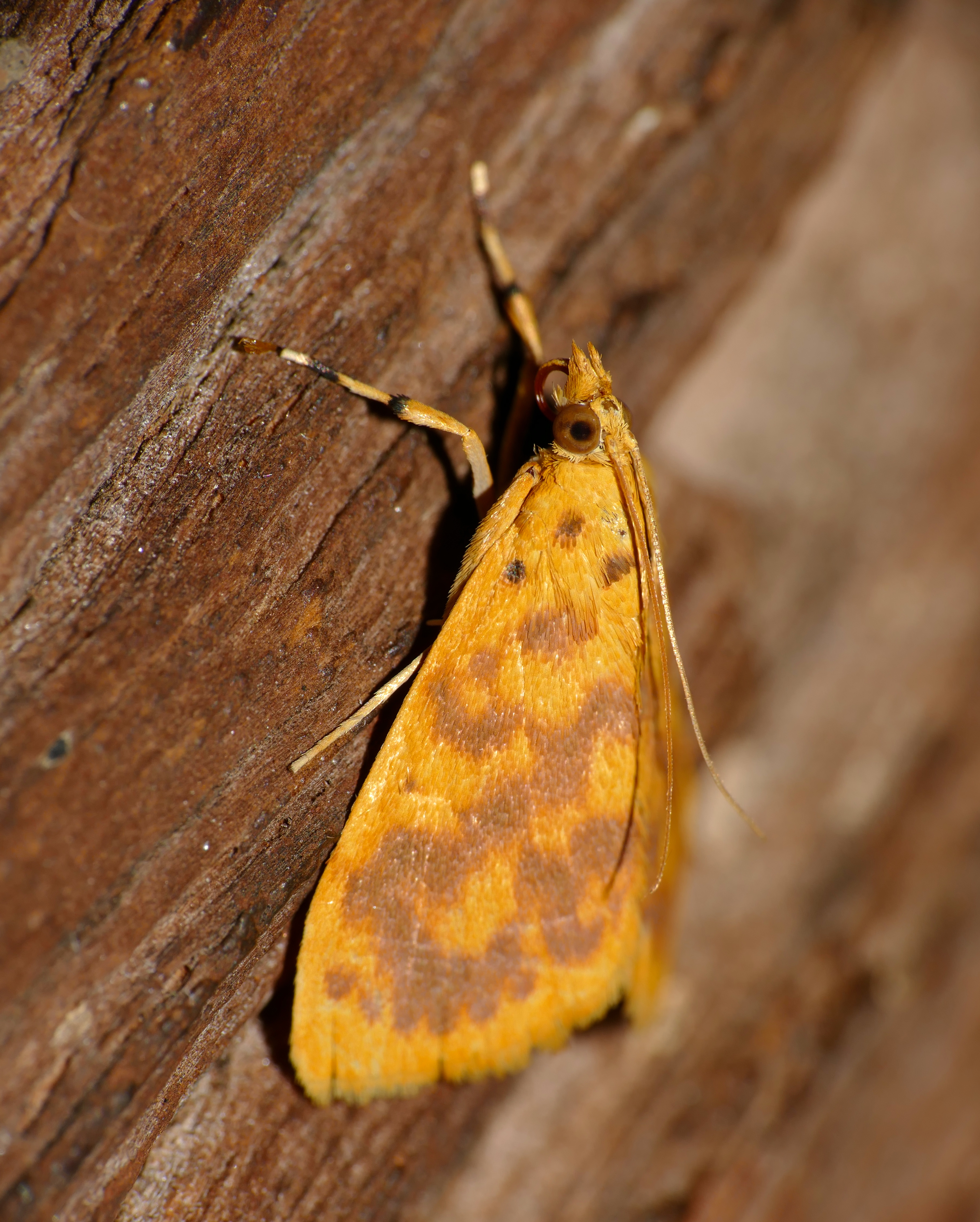
- Crambid Moth (Pioneabathra olesialis)

Scientific classification
- Domain: Eukaryota
- Kingdom: Animalia
- Phylum: Arthropoda
- Class: Insecta
- Order: Lepidoptera
- Family: Crambidae
- Subfamily: Pyraustinae
- Genus: Pioneabathra; J. C. Shaffer & Munroe, 2007
- Species: P. olesialis

Binomial name
- Pioneabathra olesialis (Walker, 1859)

Synonyms
- Ebulea olesialis Walker, 1859; Pionea brevialis Walker, 1859; Botys divisalis Lederer, 1863; Mnesictena pactolina Meyrick, 1887; Scopula eximialis Walker, 1866; Pionea holoxuthalis Hampson, 1908

= Pioneabathra =

Genus of moths

Pioneabathra is a genus of moths of the family Crambidae. It contains only one species, Pioneabathra olesialis, which is found on the Comoros and the Seychelles and in Mali, the Republic of Congo, the Democratic Republic of Congo, Mozambique, Yemen (Socotra), Zambia, India, Sri Lanka and Australia.
