= Isocentris charopalis =

Scientific classification
- Domain: Eukaryota
- Kingdom: Animalia
- Phylum: Arthropoda
- Class: Insecta
- Order: Lepidoptera
- Family: Crambidae
- Genus: Isocentris
- Species: I. charopalis

Binomial name
- Isocentris charopalis C. Swinhoe, 1907

Species of moth

Isocentris charopalis is a moth in the family Crambidae. It was described by Charles Swinhoe in 1907. It is found in the Democratic Republic of the Congo, South Africa, Zimbabwe and the Australian state of Queensland.
