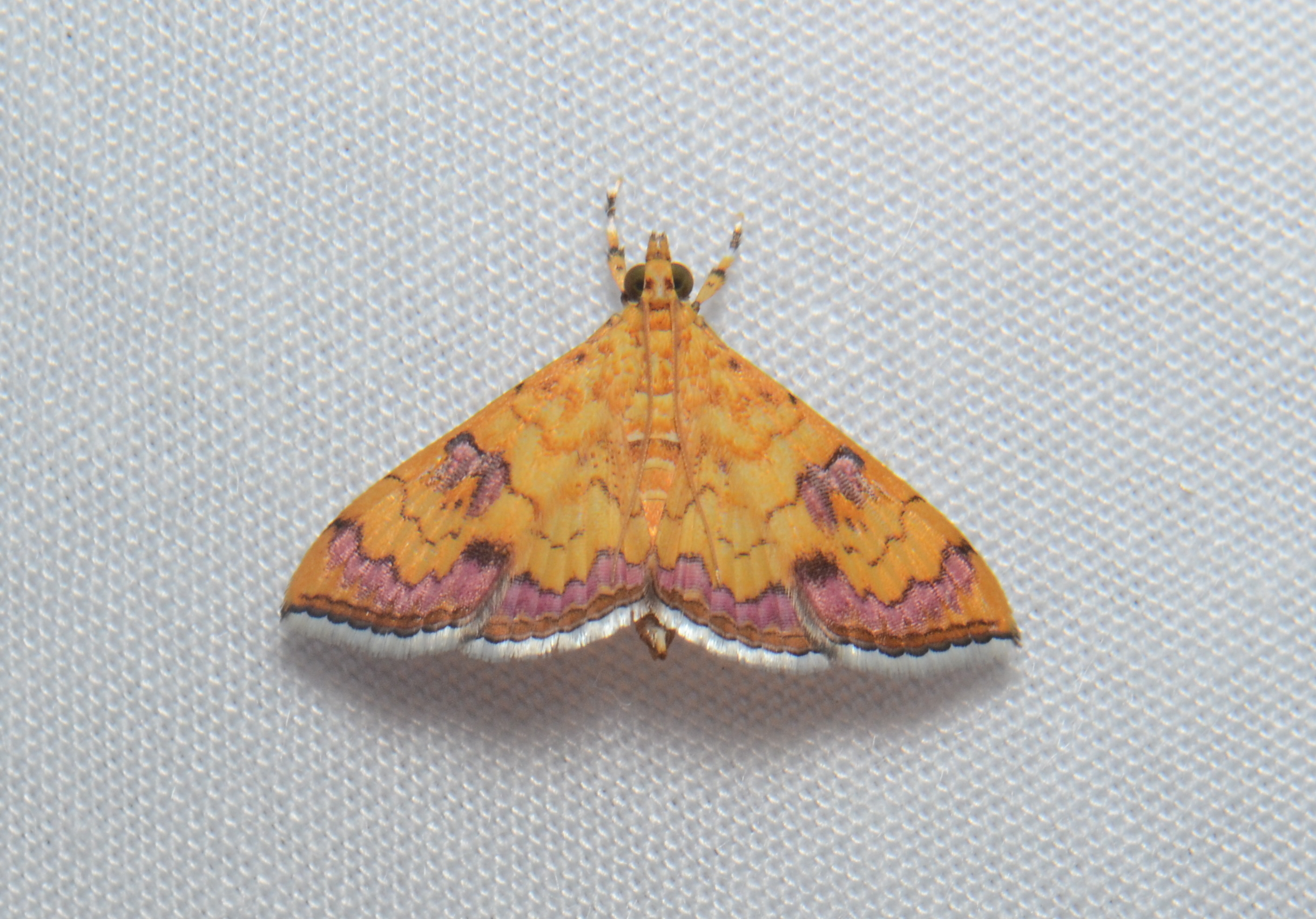

Scientific classification
- Kingdom: Animalia
- Phylum: Arthropoda
- Class: Insecta
- Order: Lepidoptera
- Family: Crambidae
- Genus: Isocentris
- Species: I. filalis

Binomial name
- Isocentris filalis (Guenée, 1854)

Synonyms
- Asopia filalis Guenée, 1854; Hyalobathra filalis; Botys holoxanthalis Mabille, 1881; Botys amoenalis Walker, 1866; Endotricha rhodophilalis Walker, 1866; Samea dives Butler, 1881; Hyalobathra metallogramma Meyrick, 1934; Hyalobathra veroniqueae Guillermet, 1996; Agrotera retinalis Saalmüller, 1880

= Isocentris filalis =

Species of moth

Isocentris filalis is a moth of the family Crambidae described by Achille Guenée in 1854. It is found in Cameroon, Comoros, the Democratic Republic of the Congo, Réunion, Madagascar, Mauritius, Togo Indonesia (Java), Myanmar and Taiwan.

Adults are bright yellow.

The larvae feed on Euphorbia virosa and Flueggea virosa.

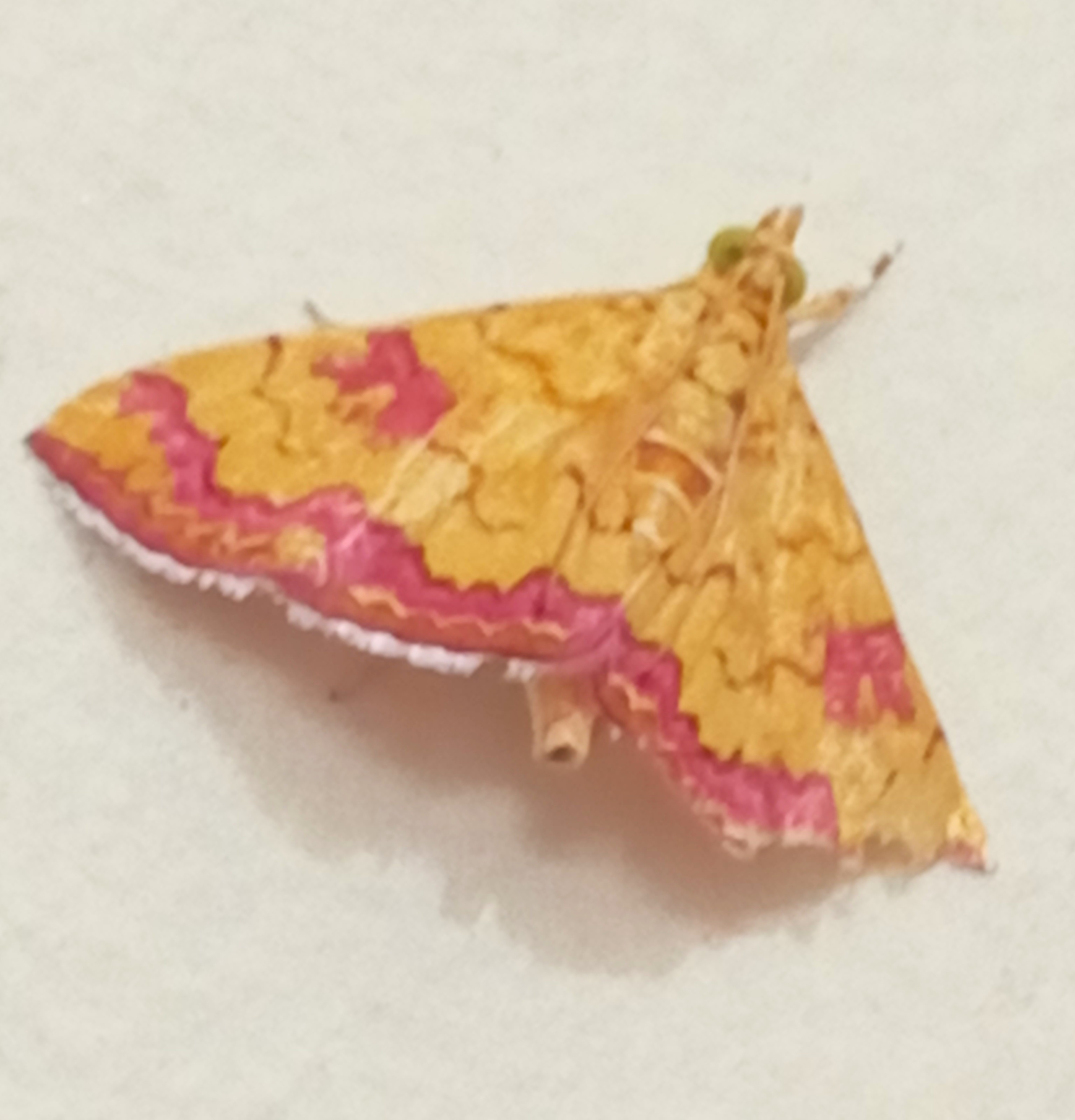
Isocentris filalis, Kolkata, West Bengal, India.
