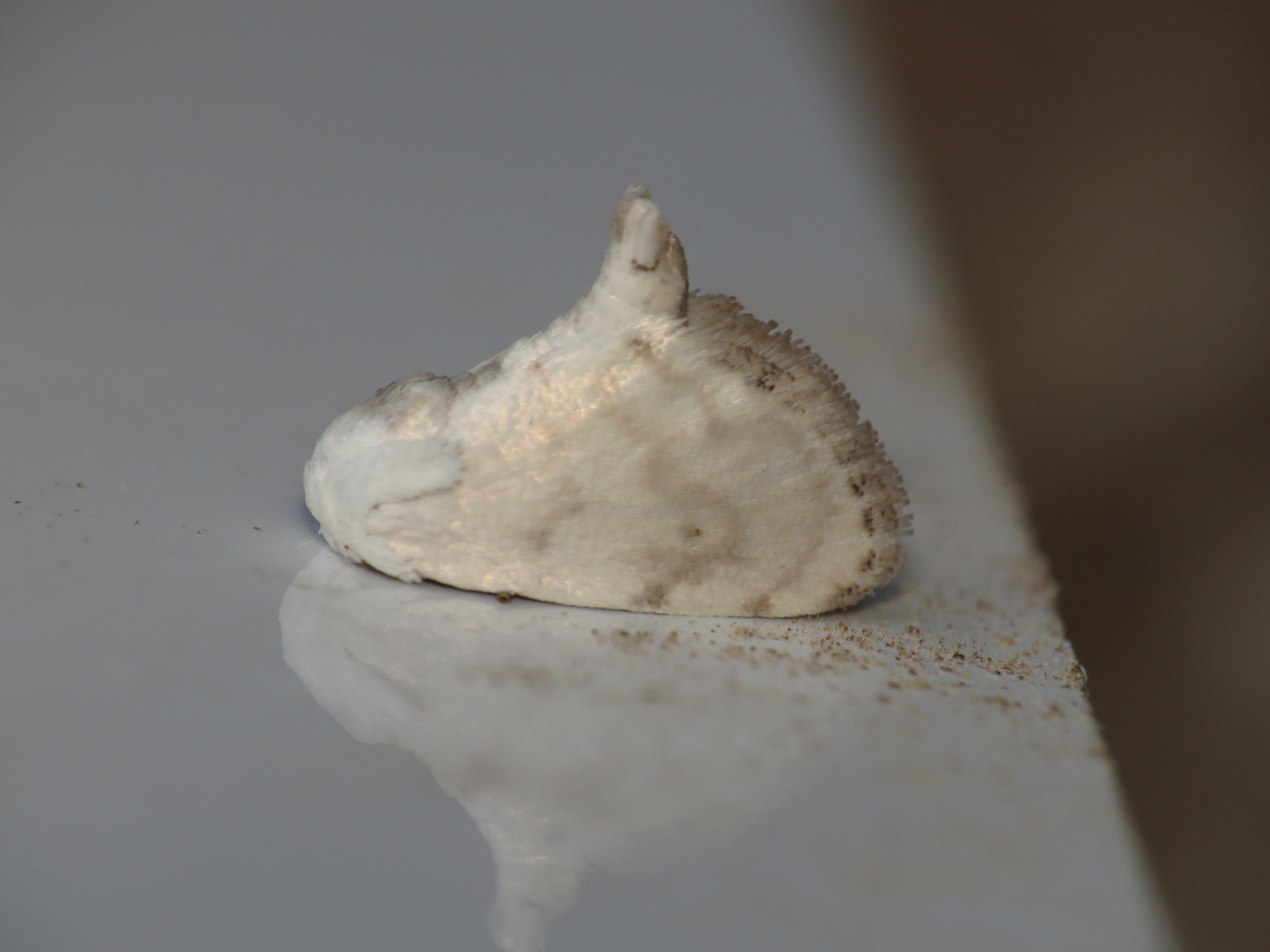
- Niphopyralis chionesis, adult

Scientific classification
- Kingdom: Animalia
- Phylum: Arthropoda
- Clade: Pancrustacea
- Class: Insecta
- Order: Lepidoptera
- Family: Crambidae
- Subfamily: Spilomelinae
- Tribe: Wurthiini; Roepke, 1916

= Wurthiini =

Tribe of the subfamily Spilomelinae in the pyraloid moth family Crambidae

Wurthiini is a tribe of the species-rich subfamily Spilomelinae in the pyraloid moth family Crambidae.

== Description ==
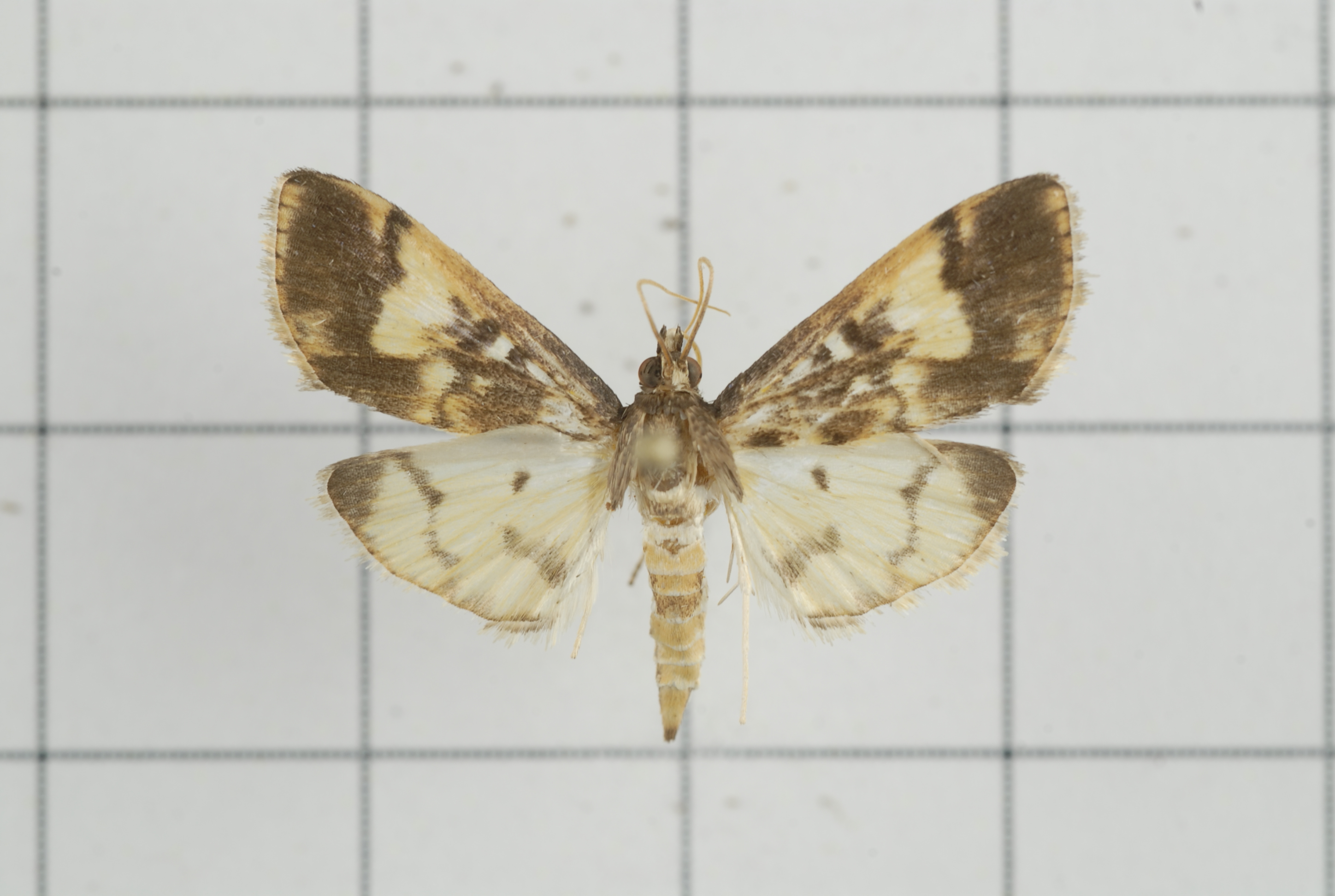
Pseudebulea fentoni, adult male

Adult Wurthiini are small to medium-sized moths with wing spans of normally 20 to over 30 mm, whereas adults of Niphopyralis are usually somewhat smaller, with wingspans of 12 to 22 mm, and the males being smaller than the females.

In the male genitalia, the uncus consists of a single head bearing stiff chaetae, or it is bicapitate (Niphopyralis). The tegumen-vinculum complex is more or less elongate rounded. The valvae are slender and tapering towards the apex, with the costa weakly to strongly concave (e.g. in Apilocrocis novateutonialis; see). The juxta is usually deeply split or divided into two juxta arms (a synapomorphy of the tribe). The fibula is broad triangular and ventrally directed. On its mesal side, the valva sacculus is produced as a strongly sclerotised arm that usually ends dorsally in a broad, spinulose tip or a needleshaped projection, and in Aristebulea, Mimetebulea and Pseudebulea, the mediodorsal sacculus bears a medially directed process. The male genitalia of Niphopyralis are highly derived.

The female genitalia exhibit a strongly sclerotised lamella antevaginalis and usually a short, membraneous ductus bursae (strongly sclerotised in Niphopyralis). The signum in the corpus bursae is either absent (Mimetebulea, Niphopyralis) or present as a small to large rounded to short transverse sclerotisation.

The larvae and pupae of Wurthiini are only known for Niphopyralis; see there for a morphological description.

== Food plants ==
Very little is known about the food plants of Wurthiini. The caterpillars of Apilocrocis glaucosia feed on Celtis iguanaea (Cannabaceae).

The larvae of Niphopyralis are myrmecophilous brood parasites in nests of nest-weaving ants of the genera Oecophylla and Polyrhachis, where they feed on their hosts' eggs, larvae and pupae.

== Distribution ==
The genera Apilocrocis and Diaphantania are found in the Americas, with the latter one confined to the Antilles, whereas the other genera are distributed in the East Palearctic, Oriental and Australasian realms.

== Systematics ==
Wurthiini currently contains nine genera, altogether comprising 43 species:

- Apilocrocis Amsel, 1956
- Aristebulea Munroe & Mutuura, 1968
- Cotachena Moore, 1885
- Diaphantania Möschler, 1890
- Loxocorys Meyrick, 1894
- Mimetebulea Munroe & Mutuura, 1968
- Niphopyralis Hampson, 1893 (synonym Wurthia Roepke, 1916, the type genus of Wurthiini)
- Pseudebulea Butler, 1881
- Togabotys Yamanaka, 1978

Wurthiini was erected by Walter Karl Johann Roepke in 1916 as subfamily Wurthiinae in Arctiidae (now Arctiinae), with Wurthia (a synonym of Niphopyralis) as its type genus. The placement of Niphopyralis, and with this the status of Wurthiini, was long unclear due to its unusual Limacodidae-like habitus and the lack of a proboscis. In 1923, the back then still valid genus Wurthia was transferred to Schoenobiinae, where also Niphopyralis had been described in 1893 by George Hampson. In 1981, Niphopyralis was transferred to Pyraustinae, while Wurthia remained in Schoenobiinae. It was not until 1996 that Wurthia was recognized as synonym of Niphopyralis.

Regier et al. (2012) found Niphopyralis to be an ingroup of Spilomelinae, and they consequently synonymised the name Wurthiinae with Spilomelinae. Eventually, in 2019 the name Wurthiini was re-erected as tribe in its current form within Spilomelinae.
