= List of crambid genera: W =

The large moth family Crambidae contains the following genera beginning with "W":

- Welaka
- Witlesia
- Wurthia
