= Togabotys =

Scientific classification
- Domain: Eukaryota
- Kingdom: Animalia
- Phylum: Arthropoda
- Class: Insecta
- Order: Lepidoptera
- Family: Crambidae
- Subfamily: Spilomelinae
- Tribe: Wurthiini
- Genus: Togabotys; Yamanaka, 1978
- Species: T. fuscolineatalis

Binomial name
- Togabotys fuscolineatalis Yamanaka, 1978

Genus of moths

Togabotys is a genus of moths of the family Crambidae. It contains only a single species, Togabotys fuscolineatalis, which is found in Japan. A phylogenetic study found Togabotys to be the sister group to Pseudebulea, and placed the genus in the tribe Wurthiini.
