= Loxocorys =

Scientific classification
- Kingdom: Animalia
- Phylum: Arthropoda
- Clade: Pancrustacea
- Class: Insecta
- Order: Lepidoptera
- Family: Crambidae
- Tribe: Wurthiini
- Genus: Loxocorys; Meyrick, 1894

Genus of moths

Loxocorys is a genus of moths of the family Crambidae. The genus was erected by Edward Meyrick in 1894, and has long been considered a synonym of Luma before it was reinstated as genus. A phylogenetic analysis showed that Loxocorys is placed in the Spilomelinae tribe Wurthiini, and in genitalia morphology it shares similarities with Niphopyralis.

== Species ==
- Loxocorys sericea (Butler, 1879)
- Loxocorys curvilineata Sohn, 2023
