= Apilocrocis steinbachi =

Scientific classification
- Domain: Eukaryota
- Kingdom: Animalia
- Phylum: Arthropoda
- Class: Insecta
- Order: Lepidoptera
- Family: Crambidae
- Genus: Apilocrocis
- Species: A. steinbachi

Binomial name
- Apilocrocis steinbachi Munroe, 1968

Species of moth

Apilocrocis steinbachi is a moth in the family Crambidae. It was described by Eugene G. Munroe in 1968. It is found in Bolivia.
