= Luma (moth) =

Scientific classification
- Domain: Eukaryota
- Kingdom: Animalia
- Phylum: Arthropoda
- Class: Insecta
- Order: Lepidoptera
- Family: Crambidae
- Subfamily: Spilomelinae
- Genus: Luma; Walker, 1863

Type species
- Luma anticalis Walker, 1863

Synonyms
- Loxocorys Meyrick, 1894; Pelena Moore, 1886; Pelina Hampson, 1897; Petena Neave, 1940

Genus of moths

Luma is a genus of moths of the family Crambidae. The genus was first discovered by Francis Walker in 1863.

== Species ==
- Luma albifascialis Hampson, 1897
- Luma anticalis Walker, 1863
- Luma flavalis Hampson, 1893
- Luma flavimarginalis Hampson, 1907
- Luma holoxantha Hampson, 1907
- Luma longidentalis Hampson, 1903
- Luma macropsalis Hampson, 1897
- Luma obscuralis (Swinhoe, 1895)
- Luma trimaculata Hampson, 1897
- Luma unicolor (Moore, 1886)

== Former species ==
- Loxocorys sericea (Butler, 1879)
