= Luma macropsalis =

Scientific classification
- Kingdom: Animalia
- Phylum: Arthropoda
- Class: Insecta
- Order: Lepidoptera
- Family: Crambidae
- Genus: Luma
- Species: L. macropsalis

Binomial name
- Luma macropsalis Hampson, 1897

Species of moth

Luma macropsalis is a moth in the family Crambidae. It was described by George Hampson in 1897. It is found on New Guinea, where it has been recorded from Fergusson Island.
