= Apilocrocis brumalis =

Scientific classification
- Domain: Eukaryota
- Kingdom: Animalia
- Phylum: Arthropoda
- Class: Insecta
- Order: Lepidoptera
- Family: Crambidae
- Genus: Apilocrocis
- Species: A. brumalis

Binomial name
- Apilocrocis brumalis (Barnes & McDunnough, 1914)

Synonyms
- Sylepta brumalis Barnes & McDunnough, 1914

Species of moth

Apilocrocis brumalis is a moth in the family Crambidae. It was described by William Barnes and James Halliday McDunnough in 1914. It is found in Mexico and the southern United States, where it has been recorded from southern Texas.

The wingspan is about 25 mm for males and 32 mm for females. The costal margin of the forewings is pale yellowish and the base is light brown, containing a white dot near the inner margin. This is bordered outwardly by a pale yellowish band. The remainder of the wing is olive green. The hindwings are white in the basal third with a small green costal dot, followed by an olive-green band. The remainder of the wing is olive green. Adults are on wing from March to May and again from July to September.
