= Luma unicolor =

Scientific classification
- Domain: Eukaryota
- Kingdom: Animalia
- Phylum: Arthropoda
- Class: Insecta
- Order: Lepidoptera
- Family: Crambidae
- Genus: Luma
- Species: L. unicolor

Binomial name
- Luma unicolor (Moore, 1886)

Synonyms
- Pelena unicolor Moore, 1886

Species of moth

Luma unicolor is a moth in the family Crambidae. It was described by Frederic Moore in 1886. It is found in Sri Lanka.
