= Luma flavimarginalis =

Scientific classification
- Kingdom: Animalia
- Phylum: Arthropoda
- Class: Insecta
- Order: Lepidoptera
- Family: Crambidae
- Genus: Luma
- Species: L. flavimarginalis

Binomial name
- Luma flavimarginalis Hampson, 1907

Species of moth

Luma flavimarginalis is a moth in the family Crambidae. It was described by George Hampson in 1907. It is found in Sri Lanka and South Africa.
