= Apilocrocis pimalis =

Scientific classification
- Domain: Eukaryota
- Kingdom: Animalia
- Phylum: Arthropoda
- Class: Insecta
- Order: Lepidoptera
- Family: Crambidae
- Genus: Apilocrocis
- Species: A. pimalis

Binomial name
- Apilocrocis pimalis (Barnes & Benjamin, 1926)

Synonyms
- Sylepta pimalis Barnes & Benjamin, 1926

Species of moth

Apilocrocis pimalis, or the Pima apilocrocis moth, is a moth in the family Crambidae. It was first described by William Barnes and Foster Hendrickson Benjamin in 1926.

It is found in North America, and has been recorded in Arizona and Texas. The moth's wingspan is 20–30 mm. Adults are on wing from June to August.
