= Niphopyralis aurivillii =

Scientific classification
- Domain: Eukaryota
- Kingdom: Animalia
- Phylum: Arthropoda
- Class: Insecta
- Order: Lepidoptera
- Family: Crambidae
- Genus: Niphopyralis
- Species: N. aurivillii

Binomial name
- Niphopyralis aurivillii (Kemner, 1923)

Synonyms
- Wurthia aurivillii Kemner, 1923

Species of moth

Niphopyralis aurivillii is a moth in the grass moths family (Crambidae). It was described by Nils Victor Alarik Kemner in 1923. It is found in Indonesia (Java).
