= Diaphantania candacalis =

Scientific classification
- Domain: Eukaryota
- Kingdom: Animalia
- Phylum: Arthropoda
- Class: Insecta
- Order: Lepidoptera
- Family: Crambidae
- Genus: Diaphantania
- Species: D. candacalis

Binomial name
- Diaphantania candacalis (C. Felder, R. Felder & Rogenhofer, 1875)

Synonyms
- Botys candacalis C. Felder, R. Felder & Rogenhofer, 1875; Diaphantania conspicualis Möschler, 1890

Species of moth

Diaphantania candacalis is a moth in the family Crambidae. It was described by Cajetan Felder, Rudolf Felder and Alois Friedrich Rogenhofer in 1875. It is found in the Dominican Republic and Puerto Rico.
