= Luma anticalis =

Scientific classification
- Kingdom: Animalia
- Phylum: Arthropoda
- Class: Insecta
- Order: Lepidoptera
- Family: Crambidae
- Genus: Luma
- Species: L. anticalis

Binomial name
- Luma anticalis Walker, 1863

Species of moth

Luma anticalis is a moth in the family Crambidae. It was described by Francis Walker in 1863. It is found on Borneo.
