= Niphopyralis albida =

Scientific classification
- Kingdom: Animalia
- Phylum: Arthropoda
- Class: Insecta
- Order: Lepidoptera
- Family: Crambidae
- Genus: Niphopyralis
- Species: N. albida

Binomial name
- Niphopyralis albida Hampson, 1893

Species of moth

Niphopyralis albida is a moth in the family Crambidae. It was described by George Hampson in 1893. It is found in Sri Lanka.

== Description ==
The wingspan is about 16 mm in the male and about 20–22 mm in the female. The wings are pure white. Forewings with a few dark scales on discocellulars, and traces of a pale fulvous oblique streak across apical area. A black marginal speck on vein 2 of each wing.
