= Niphopyralis myrmecophila =

Scientific classification
- Domain: Eukaryota
- Kingdom: Animalia
- Phylum: Arthropoda
- Class: Insecta
- Order: Lepidoptera
- Family: Crambidae
- Genus: Niphopyralis
- Species: N. myrmecophila

Binomial name
- Niphopyralis myrmecophila (Roepke, 1916)

Synonyms
- Wurthia myrmecophila Roepke, 1916

Species of moth

Niphopyralis myrmecophila is a moth in the family Crambidae. It was described by Roepke in 1916. It is found in Indonesia (Java).

The wingspan is about 22 mm.

Larvae have been recorded living in the nests of ants of the genus Oecophylla.
