= Luma longidentalis =

Scientific classification
- Kingdom: Animalia
- Phylum: Arthropoda
- Class: Insecta
- Order: Lepidoptera
- Family: Crambidae
- Genus: Luma
- Species: L. longidentalis

Binomial name
- Luma longidentalis Hampson, 1903

Species of moth

Luma longidentalis is a moth in the family Crambidae. It was described by George Hampson in 1903. It is found in Bhutan and New Guinea.
