= Apilocrocis albicupralis =

Scientific classification
- Kingdom: Animalia
- Phylum: Arthropoda
- Class: Insecta
- Order: Lepidoptera
- Family: Crambidae
- Genus: Apilocrocis
- Species: A. albicupralis

Binomial name
- Apilocrocis albicupralis (Hampson, 1918)

Synonyms
- Sylepta albicupralis Hampson, 1918

Species of moth

Apilocrocis albicupralis is a moth in the family Crambidae. It was described by George Hampson in 1918. It is found in Peru.

The wingspan is about 30 mm. The forewings are red brown with a cupreous gloss. There is a small white mark at the base and subbasal white spots on the costa and in the cell. There is a white patch on the basal part of the inner margin. There is a terminal series of minute triangular white spots. The hindwings are white, the veins slightly striated with brown and there is some reddish-brown suffusion beyond the lower angle of the cell and on the inner margin before the almost straight reddish-brown postmedial line. The terminal area is pale reddish brown with a cupreous gloss.
