= Apilocrocis pseudocephalis =

Scientific classification
- Kingdom: Animalia
- Phylum: Arthropoda
- Class: Insecta
- Order: Lepidoptera
- Family: Crambidae
- Genus: Apilocrocis
- Species: A. pseudocephalis

Binomial name
- Apilocrocis pseudocephalis Munroe, 1968

Species of moth

Apilocrocis pseudocephalis is a moth in the family Crambidae. It was described by Eugene G. Munroe in 1968. It is found in Yucatán, Mexico.
