= Apilocrocis =

Scientific classification
- Domain: Eukaryota
- Kingdom: Animalia
- Phylum: Arthropoda
- Class: Insecta
- Order: Lepidoptera
- Family: Crambidae
- Tribe: Wurthiini
- Genus: Apilocrocis; Amsel, 1956

Genus of moths

Apilocrocis is a genus of moths of the family Crambidae.

== Species ==
- Apilocrocis albicupralis (Hampson, 1918)
- Apilocrocis albipunctalis (Hampson, 1918)
- Apilocrocis brumalis (Barnes & McDunnough, 1914)
- Apilocrocis cephalis (Walker, 1859)
- Apilocrocis excelsalis (Schaus, 1912)
- Apilocrocis glaucosia (Hampson, 1912)
- Apilocrocis novateutonialis Munroe, 1968
- Apilocrocis pimalis (Barnes & Benjamin, 1926)
- Apilocrocis pseudocephalis Munroe, 1968
- Apilocrocis steinbachi Munroe, 1968
- Apilocrocis yucatanalis Munroe, 1968
