= Diaphantania =

Scientific classification
- Domain: Eukaryota
- Kingdom: Animalia
- Phylum: Arthropoda
- Class: Insecta
- Order: Lepidoptera
- Family: Crambidae
- Tribe: Wurthiini
- Genus: Diaphantania; Möschler, 1890

Synonyms
- Diaphantia

Genus of moths

Diaphantania is a genus of moths of the family Crambidae.

== Species ==
- Diaphantania candacalis (C. Felder, R. Felder & Rogenhofer, 1875)
- Diaphantania ceresalis (Walker, 1859)
- Diaphantania impulsalis (Herrich-Schäffer, 1871)
