= Niphopyralis contaminata =

Scientific classification
- Kingdom: Animalia
- Phylum: Arthropoda
- Class: Insecta
- Order: Lepidoptera
- Family: Crambidae
- Genus: Niphopyralis
- Species: N. contaminata

Binomial name
- Niphopyralis contaminata Hampson, 1893

Species of moth

Niphopyralis contaminata is a moth in the family Crambidae. It was described by George Hampson in 1893. It is found in Sri Lanka.

== Description ==
The wingspan is about 16 mm. The forewings are pure white with traces of a sinuous antemedial line. There is a diffused black patch on the discocellulars and the costa above the end of the cell. The whole outer area is fuscous black, except the apex and margin, on which black specks are present. The hindwings are white, with a few scattered fuscous scales.
