= Niphopyralis nivalis =

Scientific classification
- Kingdom: Animalia
- Phylum: Arthropoda
- Class: Insecta
- Order: Lepidoptera
- Family: Crambidae
- Genus: Niphopyralis
- Species: N. nivalis

Binomial name
- Niphopyralis nivalis Hampson, 1893

Species of moth

Niphopyralis nivalis is a moth in the family Crambidae. It was described by George Hampson in 1893. It is found in Sri Lanka.

== Description ==
The wingspan is about 16 mm. Adults are white, the forewings suffused with pale brown except the costal area. There is an ill-defined somewhat sinuous antemedial dark line, as well as slight dark discocellular marks. The apex and margin are white, sending a tooth inwards on vein 2, and with two black specks below the apex and two above the outer angle. The hindwings are pure white, with black marginal specks at vein 2.
