= Mimetebulea =

Scientific classification
- Domain: Eukaryota
- Kingdom: Animalia
- Phylum: Arthropoda
- Class: Insecta
- Order: Lepidoptera
- Family: Crambidae
- Subfamily: Spilomelinae
- Tribe: Wurthiini
- Genus: Mimetebulea; Munroe & Mutuura, 1968
- Species: M. arctialis

Binomial name
- Mimetebulea arctialis Munroe & Mutuura, 1968

Genus of moths

Mimetebulea is a genus of moths in the Spilomelinae subfamily of the family Crambidae. It contains only one species, Mimetebulea arctialis, which has been described from Zhejiang province in China. Based on a phylogenetic investigation, the genus was placed in the tribe Wurthiini.
