= Apilocrocis novateutonialis =

Scientific classification
- Domain: Eukaryota
- Kingdom: Animalia
- Phylum: Arthropoda
- Class: Insecta
- Order: Lepidoptera
- Family: Crambidae
- Genus: Apilocrocis
- Species: A. novateutonialis

Binomial name
- Apilocrocis novateutonialis Munroe, 1968

Species of moth

Apilocrocis novateutonialis is a moth in the family Crambidae. It was described by Eugene G. Munroe in 1968. It is found in Santa Catarina, Brazil.
