= Apilocrocis excelsalis =

Scientific classification
- Domain: Eukaryota
- Kingdom: Animalia
- Phylum: Arthropoda
- Class: Insecta
- Order: Lepidoptera
- Family: Crambidae
- Genus: Apilocrocis
- Species: A. excelsalis

Binomial name
- Apilocrocis excelsalis (Schaus, 1912)

Synonyms
- Sylepta excelsalis Schaus, 1912

Species of moth

Apilocrocis excelsalis is a moth in the family Crambidae. It was described by Schaus in 1912. It is found in Costa Rica and Honduras, south to Argentina.
