= Diaphantania ceresalis =

Scientific classification
- Kingdom: Animalia
- Phylum: Arthropoda
- Class: Insecta
- Order: Lepidoptera
- Family: Crambidae
- Genus: Diaphantania
- Species: D. ceresalis

Binomial name
- Diaphantania ceresalis (Walker, 1859)

Synonyms
- Botys ceresalis Walker, 1859

Species of moth

Diaphantania ceresalis is a moth in the family Crambidae. It was described by Francis Walker in 1859. It is found in the Dominican Republic, Cuba and Puerto Rico.
