= Luma obscuralis =

Scientific classification
- Domain: Eukaryota
- Kingdom: Animalia
- Phylum: Arthropoda
- Class: Insecta
- Order: Lepidoptera
- Family: Crambidae
- Genus: Luma
- Species: L. obscuralis

Binomial name
- Luma obscuralis (C. Swinhoe, 1895)

Synonyms
- Loxocorys obscuralis C. Swinhoe, 1895

Species of moth

Luma obscuralis is a moth in the family Crambidae. It was described by Charles Swinhoe in 1895. It is found in India.
