= Pseudebulea kuatunensis =

Scientific classification
- Domain: Eukaryota
- Kingdom: Animalia
- Phylum: Arthropoda
- Class: Insecta
- Order: Lepidoptera
- Family: Crambidae
- Genus: Pseudebulea
- Species: P. kuatunensis

Binomial name
- Pseudebulea kuatunensis Munroe & Mutuura, 1968

Species of moth

Pseudebulea kuatunensis is a moth in the family Crambidae. It was described by Eugene G. Munroe and Akira Mutuura in 1968. It is found in Fujian and Hubei provinces of China.

== Subspecies ==
- Pseudebulea kuatunensis kuatunensis (China: Fujian)
- Pseudebulea kuatunensis ichangensis Munroe & Mutuura, 1968 (China: Hubei)
