= Apilocrocis cephalis =

Scientific classification
- Kingdom: Animalia
- Phylum: Arthropoda
- Class: Insecta
- Order: Lepidoptera
- Family: Crambidae
- Genus: Apilocrocis
- Species: A. cephalis

Binomial name
- Apilocrocis cephalis (Walker, 1859)

Synonyms
- Botys cephalis Walker, 1859; Pilocrocis microbathra Meyrick, 1936

Species of moth

Apilocrocis cephalis is a moth in the family Crambidae. It was described by Francis Walker in 1859. It is found in Venezuela.
