= Niphopyralis suffidalis =

Scientific classification
- Domain: Eukaryota
- Kingdom: Animalia
- Phylum: Arthropoda
- Class: Insecta
- Order: Lepidoptera
- Family: Crambidae
- Genus: Niphopyralis
- Species: N. suffidalis

Binomial name
- Niphopyralis suffidalis C. Swinhoe, 1895

Species of moth

Niphopyralis suffidalis is a moth in the family Crambidae. It was described by Charles Swinhoe in 1895. It is found in India, Bhutan, Sri Lanka and on Borneo.

The wingspan is 20–22 mm. Adults are pure white, the forewings with a few dark scales on the discocellulars and traces of a pale fulvous oblique streak across the apical area. There is a black marginal speck on vein 2 of each wing. The hindwings are mostly suffused with fuscous.
