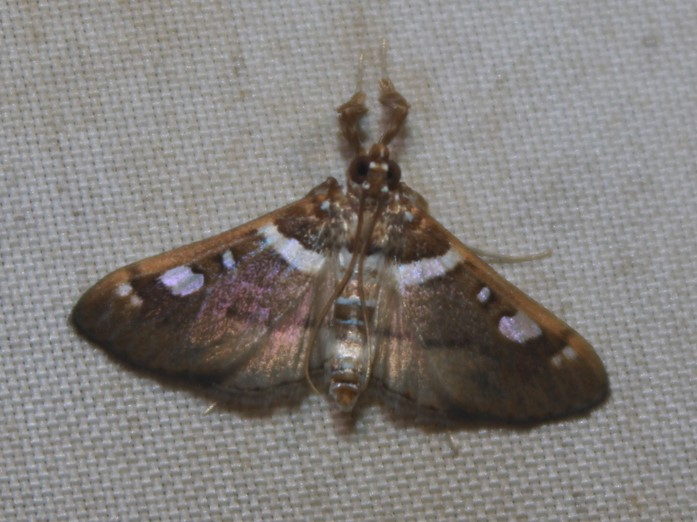

Scientific classification
- Domain: Eukaryota
- Kingdom: Animalia
- Phylum: Arthropoda
- Class: Insecta
- Order: Lepidoptera
- Family: Crambidae
- Genus: Diaphantania
- Species: D. impulsalis

Binomial name
- Diaphantania impulsalis (Herrich-Schäffer, 1871)

Synonyms
- Botys impulsalis Herrich-Schäffer, 1871

= Diaphantania impulsalis =

Species of moth

Diaphantania impulsalis is a species of moth in the family Crambidae. It was first described by Gottlieb August Wilhelm Herrich-Schäffer in 1871. It is found in Cuba and the US (Florida).
