= Luma trimaculata =

Scientific classification
- Kingdom: Animalia
- Phylum: Arthropoda
- Class: Insecta
- Order: Lepidoptera
- Family: Crambidae
- Genus: Luma
- Species: L. trimaculata

Binomial name
- Luma trimaculata Hampson, 1897

Species of moth

Luma trimaculata is a moth in the family Crambidae. It was described by George Hampson in 1897. It is found on Borneo.
