= Aristebulea nobilis =

Scientific classification
- Domain: Eukaryota
- Kingdom: Animalia
- Phylum: Arthropoda
- Class: Insecta
- Order: Lepidoptera
- Family: Crambidae
- Genus: Aristebulea
- Species: A. nobilis

Binomial name
- Aristebulea nobilis (Moore, 1888)

Synonyms
- Pionea nobilis Moore, 1888

Species of moth

Aristebulea nobilis is a moth in the family Crambidae. It was described by Frederic Moore in 1888. It is found in Darjeeling, India.
