= Niphopyralis discipunctalis =

Scientific classification
- Kingdom: Animalia
- Phylum: Arthropoda
- Class: Insecta
- Order: Lepidoptera
- Family: Crambidae
- Genus: Niphopyralis
- Species: N. discipunctalis

Binomial name
- Niphopyralis discipunctalis Hampson, 1919

Species of moth

Niphopyralis discipunctalis is a moth in the family Crambidae. It was described by George Hampson in 1919. It is found in Papua New Guinea, where it has been recorded from Misima Island in the Louisiade Archipelago.

The wingspan is about 18 mm. The forewings are glossy white with a black discoidal point and a slight blackish terminal line, almost obsolete except towards the apex. The hindwings are glossy white with a slight blackish terminal line to near the turnus.
