= Luma holoxantha =

Scientific classification
- Kingdom: Animalia
- Phylum: Arthropoda
- Class: Insecta
- Order: Lepidoptera
- Family: Crambidae
- Genus: Luma
- Species: L. holoxantha

Binomial name
- Luma holoxantha Hampson, 1907

Species of moth

Luma holoxantha is a moth in the family Crambidae. It was described by George Hampson in 1907. It is found in Zimbabwe.
