= Luma flavalis =

Scientific classification
- Kingdom: Animalia
- Phylum: Arthropoda
- Class: Insecta
- Order: Lepidoptera
- Family: Crambidae
- Genus: Luma
- Species: L. flavalis

Binomial name
- Luma flavalis Hampson, 1893

Species of moth

Luma flavalis is a moth in the family Crambidae. It was described by George Hampson in 1893. It is found in Sri Lanka.
