= Luma albifascialis =

Scientific classification
- Kingdom: Animalia
- Phylum: Arthropoda
- Class: Insecta
- Order: Lepidoptera
- Family: Crambidae
- Genus: Luma
- Species: L. albifascialis

Binomial name
- Luma albifascialis Hampson, 1897

Species of moth

Luma albifascialis is a moth in the family Crambidae. It was described by George Hampson in 1897. It is found in Jamaica.
