= Apilocrocis albipunctalis =

Scientific classification
- Kingdom: Animalia
- Phylum: Arthropoda
- Class: Insecta
- Order: Lepidoptera
- Family: Crambidae
- Genus: Apilocrocis
- Species: A. albipunctalis

Binomial name
- Apilocrocis albipunctalis (Hampson, 1918)

Synonyms
- Sylepta albipunctalis Hampson, 1918

Species of moth

Apilocrocis albipunctalis is a moth in the family Crambidae. It was described by George Hampson in 1918. It is found in Ecuador and Bolivia.

The wingspan is about 28 mm. The forewings are pale red brown with a cupreous gloss. There is a curved white band from the base of the costa to the base of the inner margin, as well as a short white antemedial streak and spots below the cell and on the inner margin. The postmedial line is white and there is a series of terminal brown spots. The hindwings are silvery white, the disk faintly tinged with brown. There are faint brown postmedial and subterminal spots.
