= Aristebulea =

Scientific classification
- Domain: Eukaryota
- Kingdom: Animalia
- Phylum: Arthropoda
- Class: Insecta
- Order: Lepidoptera
- Family: Crambidae
- Subfamily: Spilomelinae
- Genus: Aristebulea; Munroe & Mutuura, 1968

Genus of moths

Aristebulea is a genus of moths of the family Crambidae.

== Species ==
- Aristebulea nobilis (Moore, 1888)
- Aristebulea principis Munroe & Mutuura, 1968
