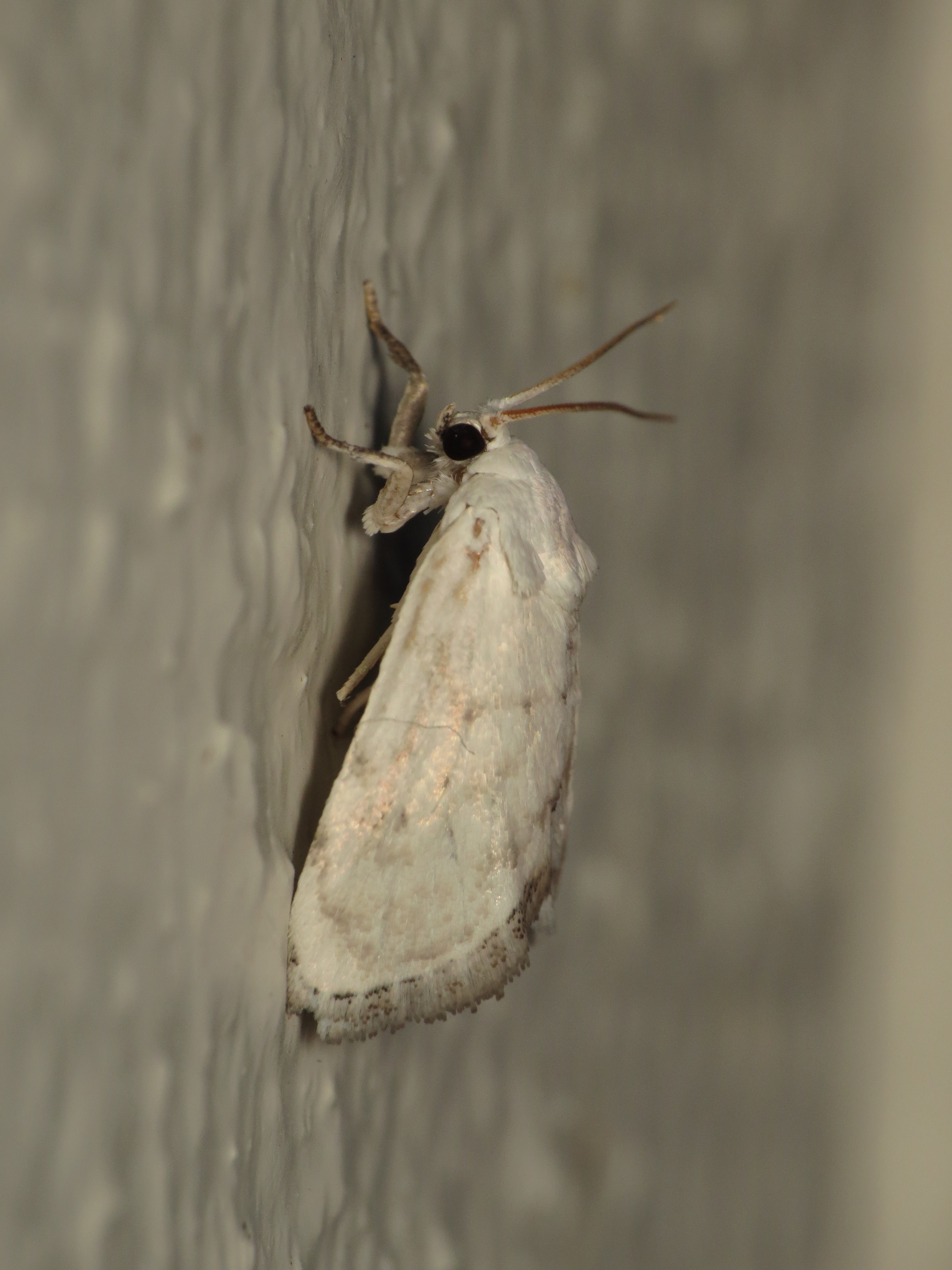

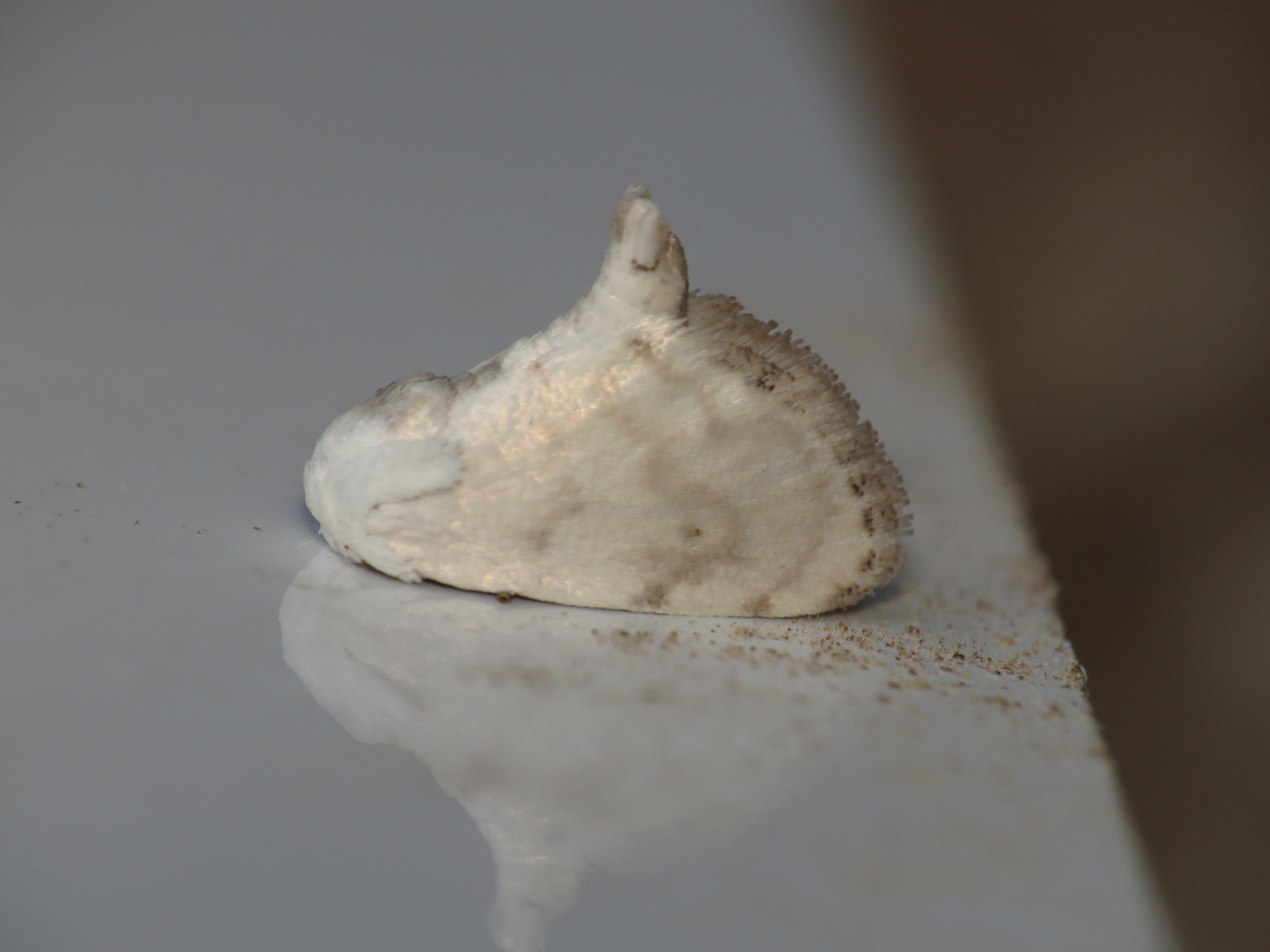

Scientific classification
- Kingdom: Animalia
- Phylum: Arthropoda
- Class: Insecta
- Order: Lepidoptera
- Family: Crambidae
- Genus: Niphopyralis
- Species: N. chionesis

Binomial name
- Niphopyralis chionesis Hampson, 1919

= Niphopyralis chionesis =

Species of moth

Niphopyralis chionesis is a moth in the family Crambidae. It was described by George Hampson in 1919. It is found in Australia, where it has been recorded from Queensland, Western Australia and the Northern Territory.

The wingspan is about 20 mm. The forewings are glossy white and thickly scaled, with traces of a waved fuscous antemedial line except towards the costa. There is a faint sinuous medial line angled outwards beyond the cell and ending at the submedian fold. There is a rather more distinct subterminal line, excurved from below the costa to vein 2, then oblique and sinuous. There is also a terminal series of blackish striae. The hindwings are glossy white with a faint brownish shade beyond the cell and a slight blackish terminal line to near the tornus and a point at the submedial fold.
