= Apilocrocis glaucosia =

Scientific classification
- Kingdom: Animalia
- Phylum: Arthropoda
- Class: Insecta
- Order: Lepidoptera
- Family: Crambidae
- Genus: Apilocrocis
- Species: A. glaucosia

Binomial name
- Apilocrocis glaucosia (Hampson, 1912)

Synonyms
- Sylepta glaucosia Hampson, 1912

Species of moth

Apilocrocis glaucosia is a moth in the family Crambidae. It was described by George Hampson in 1912. It is found in Panama, Guatemala and Mexico.

The wingspan is 28–32 mm. The forewings are pale glaucous grey. The costa is white with a fulvous streak below it and there is a fuscous subbasal shade from the cell to the inner margin, followed by a whitish band. There is also a quadrate semihyaline white spot just beyond the discocellulars. The hindwings are pale glaucous grey with a semihyaline white basal area.
