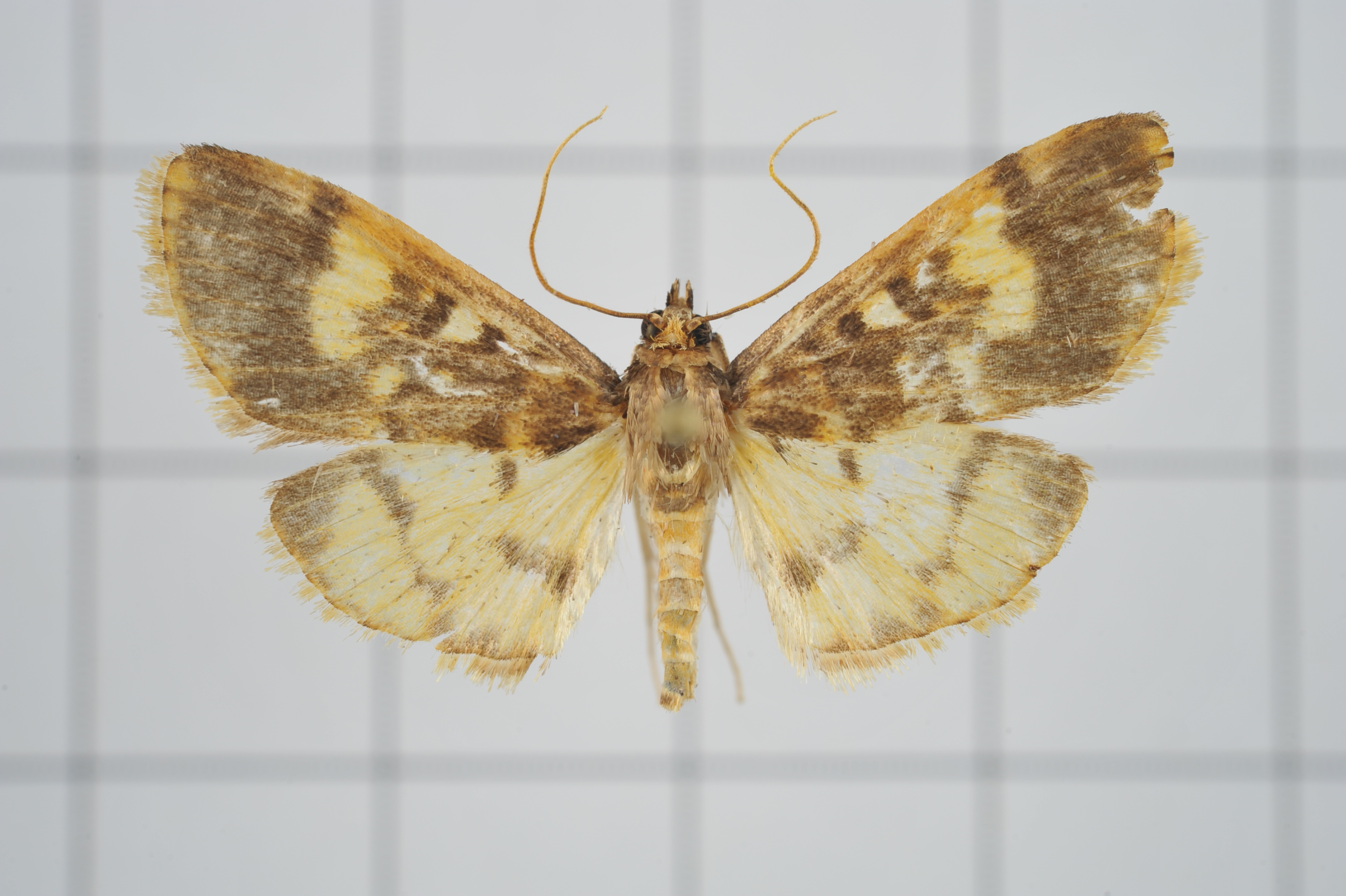

Scientific classification
- Domain: Eukaryota
- Kingdom: Animalia
- Phylum: Arthropoda
- Class: Insecta
- Order: Lepidoptera
- Family: Crambidae
- Genus: Pseudebulea
- Species: P. fentoni

Binomial name
- Pseudebulea fentoni Butler, 1881

= Pseudebulea fentoni =

Species of moth

Pseudebulea fentoni is a moth in the family Crambidae. It was described by Arthur Gardiner Butler in 1881. It is found in Japan, Korea and the Russian Far East (Ussuri).

== Subspecies ==
- Pseudebulea fentoni fentoni
- Pseudebulea fentoni koreensis Munroe & Mutuura, 1968 (Korea)
- Pseudebulea fentoni sadoensis Munroe & Mutuura, 1968 (Japan: Honshu)
- Pseudebulea fentoni ussuriensis Munroe & Mutuura, 1968 (Russia: Ussuri)
- Pseudebulea fentoni yezoensis Munroe & Mutuura, 1968 (Japan: Hokkaido)
