= Pseudebulea =

Scientific classification
- Domain: Eukaryota
- Kingdom: Animalia
- Phylum: Arthropoda
- Class: Insecta
- Order: Lepidoptera
- Family: Crambidae
- Tribe: Wurthiini
- Genus: Pseudebulea; Butler, 1881

Genus of moths

Pseudebulea is a genus of moths of the family Crambidae.

== Species ==
- Pseudebulea fentoni Butler, 1881
- Pseudebulea hainanensis Munroe & Mutuura, 1968
- Pseudebulea kuatunensis Munroe & Mutuura, 1968
- Pseudebulea lungtanensis Munroe & Mutuura, 1968
