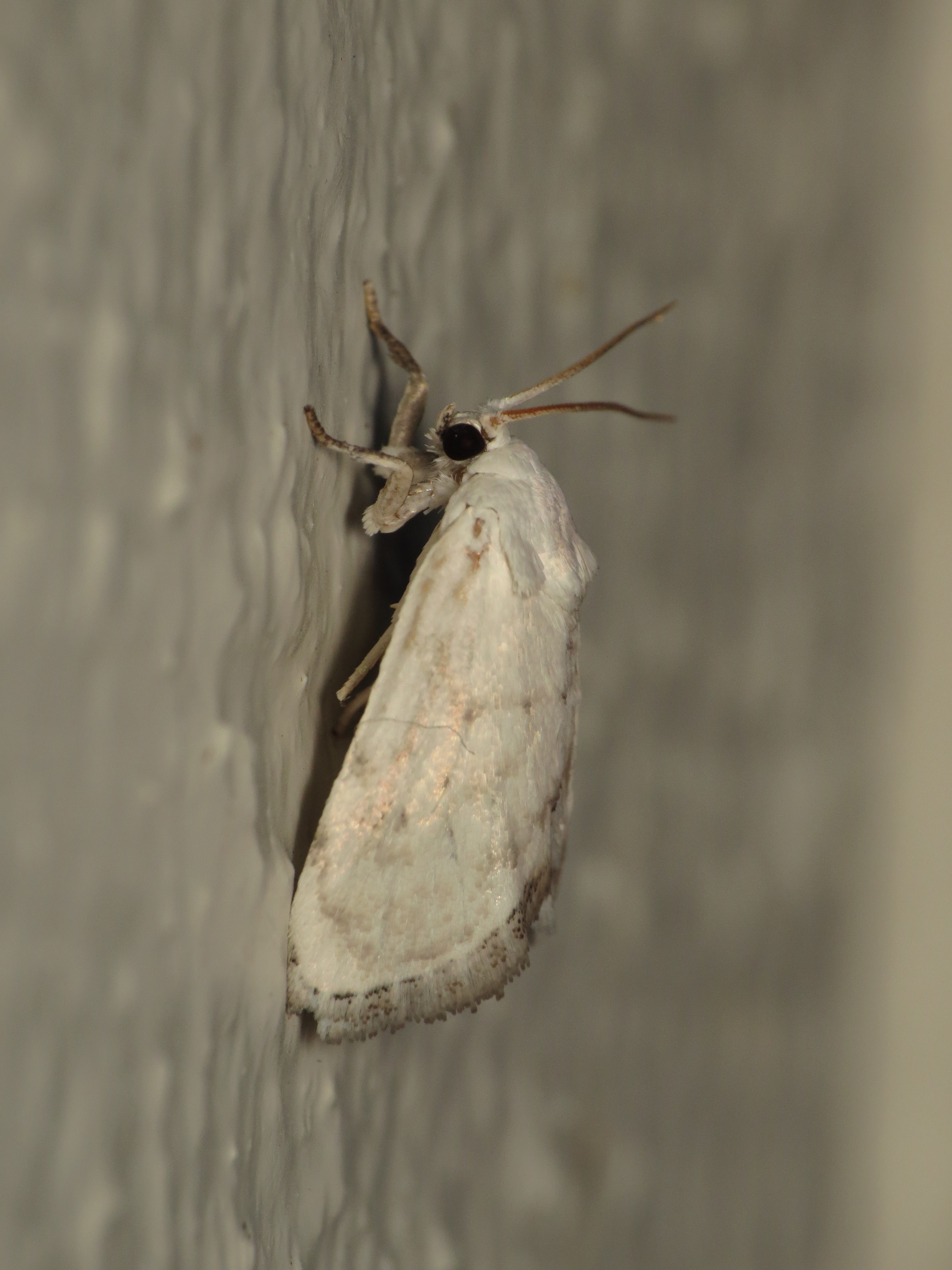
- Niphopyralis chionesis

Scientific classification
- Kingdom: Animalia
- Phylum: Arthropoda
- Clade: Pancrustacea
- Class: Insecta
- Order: Lepidoptera
- Family: Crambidae
- Tribe: Wurthiini
- Genus: Niphopyralis; Hampson, 1893

Synonyms
- Wurthia Roepke, 1916

= Niphopyralis =

Genus of moths

Niphopyralis is a genus of snout moths of the subfamily Spilomelinae in the family Crambidae.

== Description ==
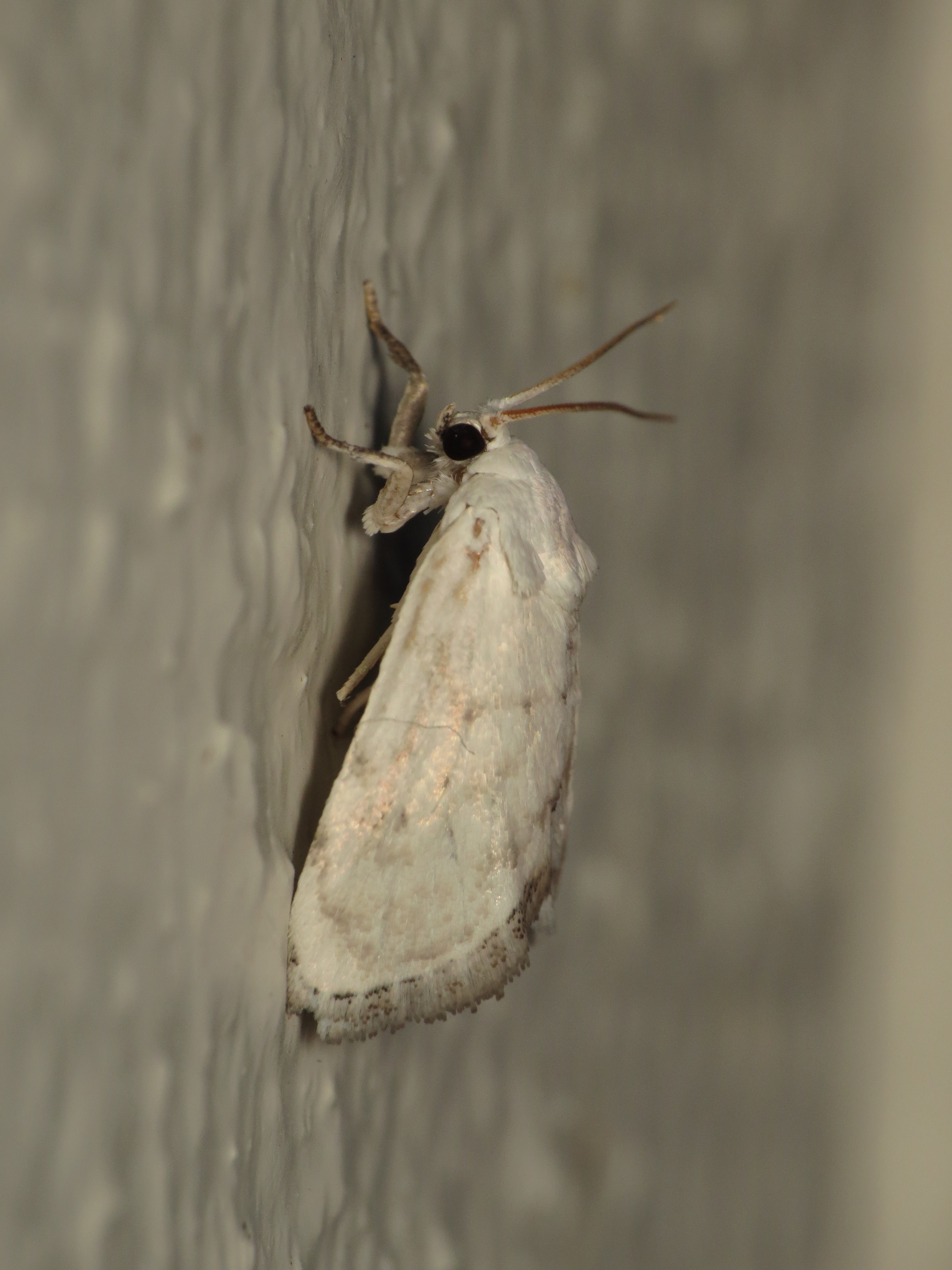
Niphopyralis chionesis, adult

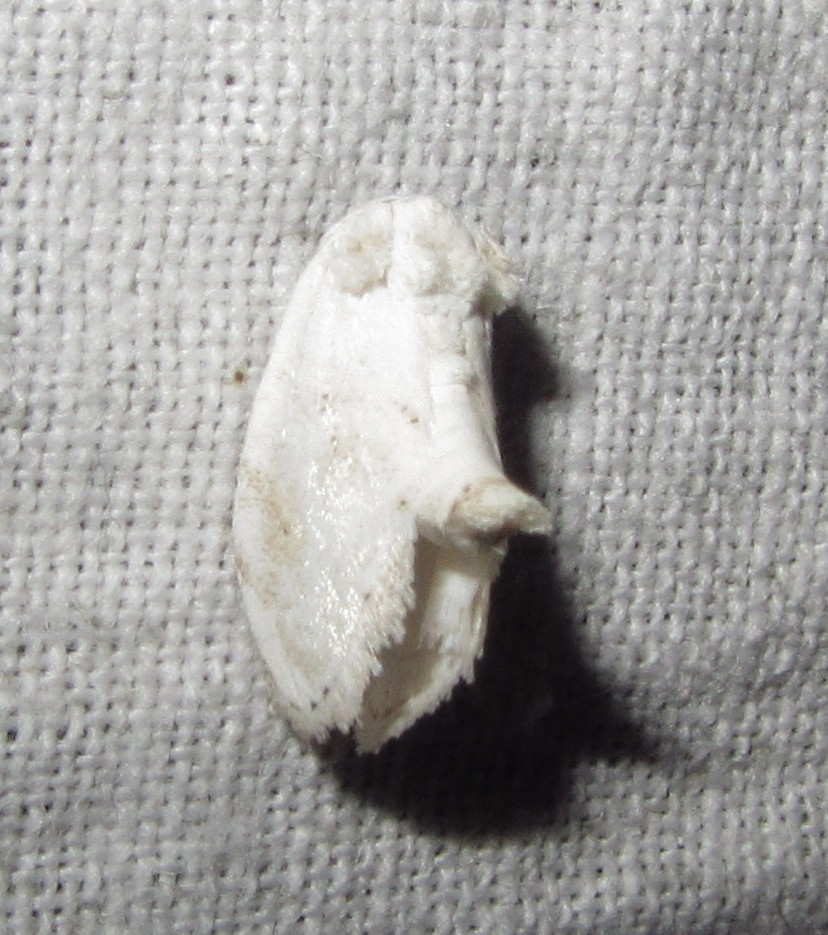
adult of an unidentified Niphopyralis species

=== Caterpillars ===
The reports on larvae are somewhat divergent, depending on the species and the condition of the larvae (fresh versus alcohol-preserved): The fully-grown caterpillar of Niphopyralis myrmecophila (according to material preserved in alcohol) is approximately 14 mm in length, 4.4 mm thick at its largest diameter, and completely colourless, with the spiracles visible as fine, shiny colourless dots. The larval body is naked, hardly flattened, markedly tapered anteriorly and posteriorly, with all segments bulging out almost in a physogastric way. The head is small and prognathous. The thoracal legs are well developed, the prolegs are strongly reduced, and only at high magnification the single circle of crochets and the small papilla are visible; the anal prolegs are completely reduced, but this may be due to the investigated larvae being in the process of pupation.

The fully-grown caterpillar of Niphopyralis aurivillii are 6 to 7.5 mm long and 1.5 mm thick, and is tapers only slightly towards the ends. The body has a yellow-white colour, with head and pronotum somewhat darker. The entire body is diffusely covered with long, soft, colourless chaetae. The head is about two thirds the breadth of the pronotum, almost twice as long as broad, and tapered towards the front. The two epicranial halves are almost triangular and encompass a large tongue-shaped frontal plate that reaches posteriad to the occipital opening. Each side of the head bears six ocelli, with the upper five in a curved line, and the sixth separate more ventral; the latter ocellus is not pigmented like the others. The larval antennae are consist of three merons. The mandibles long and conspicuously pointed in young larvae, more blunt in older larvae. The labium carries a well-developed spinneret. The thoracal and abdominal segments are weakly chitinised. The somewhat stronger chitinised pronotum is about twice as long as the meso- and metathorax. Thoracal legs are well-developed. Abdominal segments 1 to 7 are almost uniform, the eighth and ninth narrower, and the anal plate rounded. The four pairs of prolegs on abdominal segments 3 to 6 are well-developed, with a single, entire circle of crochets; half-grown larvae have 11 to 14 crochets, fully grown ones up to 25. The well-developed anal prolegs have an angularly curved frontal row of 11 crochets in falf-grown larvae and more in older ones.

=== Pupae ===
The pupa is stout and slightly flattened. In Niphopyralis aurivillii, the pupa is 6 to 6.5 mm long and 2 mm broad, and of a light brown-yellow colour. The imago emerges from a mouthlike cleft on one end of the cocoon.

=== Imagines ===
Imagines of Niphopyralis exhibit an unusual, somewhat Limacodidae-like habitus. Furthermore, they lack a proboscis, have reduced palpi, and the males exhibit bipectinate antennae, a mix of characters that for a long time hindered their correct placement among Lepidoptera (see Systematics).

The wingspan ranges from 12 to 22 mm, and the males being smaller than the females. The lower two thirds of the male antennae are bipectinate with ciliated teeth approximately as long as the antenna’s breadth. The compound eyes are large and rounded. A proboscis and ocelli are absent, and the labial palps are small. The body and wings are whitish to cream, with the front wing upper side usually exhibiting a diffuse wing pattern, whereas the underside has a dark brown colour.

=== DNA sequence data ===
DNA barcode data for different, mostly unidentified species of Niphopyralis are stored in the Barcode of Life Data System (BOLD), although only part of the sequences are publicly accessible.

== Behaviour ==
The caterpillar of Niphopyralis myrmecophila lives in a flat oval self-spun casing consisting of two slightly curved halves that fit precisely onto one another. The halves are only loosely spun together, so that they can be easily separated. The casing tissue is relatively coarse. The outside colour is a dirty white, the inner side is lighter. The casing of a fully-grown caterpillar measures 15 x 11 mm, and the caterpillar is fully concealed by it. The larval cases seem to lie loosely in the nests of their host ants. Caterpillars of N. aurivillii have also been observed to live freely in the nests, and only occasionally they are found on the nest ground, fixed by a loose weave of a few crossed threads. Fully-grown larvae are also found in pupal ant cocoons, where they feed on the ant pupa. However, for pupation they also spin a cocoon similar to that of N. myrmecophila. The observations of Roepke (1916) on N. myrmecophila might therefore refer only to fully grown caterpillars, while the younger caterpillars potentially also live freely in the ant nests, but were not observed.

The caterpillars are fully tolerated in the nest, but are not cared for by the host ants. They actively participate in the maintenance of the ant nest by repairing and reinforcing walls with spinning thread. Small caterpillars live among eggs and small ant larvae on which they feed, as examinations of the gut contents have shown. Larger caterpillars are found among ant larvae and pupae. In cases where the ant colony is moving to a new nest, small caterpillars are carried passively to the new nest, but not actively by the ants, whereas large caterpillars remain in the old nest.

The adult moths are diurnal. The flight is neither fast nor lengthy, and with rapid wing movement. After settling down, the moth usually walks a short distance, with its wings held horizontally and skewed backwards. In resting position, the wings are normally held vertically, covering the body from the sides, and the abdomen is raised to approximately 45°. Like the caterpillars and pupae, the adults are not attacked by the ants.

== Systematics ==
The genus currently comprises eight species:

- Niphopyralis albida Hampson, 1893
- Niphopyralis aurivillii (Kemner, 1923)
- Niphopyralis chionesis Hampson, 1919
- Niphopyralis contaminata Hampson, 1893
- Niphopyralis discipunctalis Hampson, 1919
- Niphopyralis myrmecophila (Roepke, 1916)
- Niphopyralis nivalis Hampson, 1893 – type species of Niphopyralis
- Niphopyralis suffidalis Swinhoe, 1895

The genus Niphopyralis was described by George Hampson in 1893, who placed it in the subfamily Pyraustinae, but later transferred it to Schoenobiinae. Twenty-three years later, in 1916, Walter Karl Johann Roepke described Wurthia and erected the new subfamily Wurthiinae, which he placed in Arctiidae (now Arctiinae).

Kemner (1923) transferred Wurthia to Schoenobiinae based on similarities to Niphopyralis. Lewvanich (1981) removed Niphopyralis from Schoenobiinae and transferred it to Pyraustinae, while Wurthia remained in Schoenobiinae. Common (1990), realising that Wurthia is misplaced in Schoenobiinae, re-established the subfamily Wurthiinae with this genus as the sole member. Eventually, in 1996, Wurthia was recognized as synonym of Niphopyralis.

Recently, Regier et al. (2012) found Niphopyralis to be an ingroup of Spilomelinae, and they consequently synonymised the name Wurthiinae with Spilomelinae. Since 2019, the name Wurthiini is in use again as tribe of Spilomelinae.
