= Paranomis sidemialis =

Scientific classification
- Domain: Eukaryota
- Kingdom: Animalia
- Phylum: Arthropoda
- Class: Insecta
- Order: Lepidoptera
- Family: Crambidae
- Genus: Paranomis
- Species: P. sidemialis

Binomial name
- Paranomis sidemialis Munroe & Mutuura, 1968

Species of moth

Paranomis sidemialis is a moth in the family Crambidae. It was described by Eugene G. Munroe and Akira Mutuura in 1968. It is found in Russia (Manchuria).
