= Paranomis denticosta =

Scientific classification
- Domain: Eukaryota
- Kingdom: Animalia
- Phylum: Arthropoda
- Class: Insecta
- Order: Lepidoptera
- Family: Crambidae
- Genus: Paranomis
- Species: P. denticosta

Binomial name
- Paranomis denticosta Munroe & Mutuura, 1968

Species of moth

Paranomis denticosta is a moth in the family Crambidae. It was described by Eugene G. Munroe and Akira Mutuura in 1968. It is found in Yunnan, China.
