= Paranomis =

Scientific classification
- Domain: Eukaryota
- Kingdom: Animalia
- Phylum: Arthropoda
- Class: Insecta
- Order: Lepidoptera
- Family: Crambidae
- Subfamily: Pyraustinae
- Genus: Paranomis; Munroe & Mutuura, 1968

Genus of moths

Paranomis is a genus of moths of the family Crambidae.

== Species ==
- Paranomis denticosta Munroe & Mutuura, 1968
- Paranomis moupinensis Munroe & Mutuura, 1968
- Paranomis nodicosta Munroe & Mutuura, 1968
- Paranomis sidemialis Munroe & Mutuura, 1968
