= Paranomis moupinensis =

Scientific classification
- Kingdom: Animalia
- Phylum: Arthropoda
- Clade: Pancrustacea
- Class: Insecta
- Order: Lepidoptera
- Family: Crambidae
- Genus: Paranomis
- Species: P. moupinensis

Binomial name
- Paranomis moupinensis Munroe & Mutuura, 1968

Species of moth

Paranomis moupinensis is a moth in the family Crambidae. It was described by Eugene G. Munroe and Akira Mutuura in 1968. It is found in Sichuan, China.
