= Ennomosia =

Scientific classification
- Kingdom: Animalia
- Phylum: Arthropoda
- Class: Insecta
- Order: Lepidoptera
- Family: Crambidae
- Subfamily: Pyraustinae
- Genus: Ennomosia; Amsel, 1956

Genus of moths

Ennomosia is a genus of moths of the family Crambidae.

== Species ==
- Ennomosia atribasalis
- Ennomosia basalis (Hampson, 1897)
- Ennomosia geometridalis Amsel, 1956
