= Ennomosia geometridalis =

Scientific classification
- Domain: Eukaryota
- Kingdom: Animalia
- Phylum: Arthropoda
- Class: Insecta
- Order: Lepidoptera
- Family: Crambidae
- Genus: Ennomosia
- Species: E. geometridalis

Binomial name
- Ennomosia geometridalis Amsel, 1956

Species of moth

Ennomosia geometridalis is a moth in the family Crambidae. It was described by Hans Georg Amsel in 1956. It is found in Venezuela.
