= Ennomosia atribasalis =

Scientific classification
- Kingdom: Animalia
- Phylum: Arthropoda
- Class: Insecta
- Order: Lepidoptera
- Family: Crambidae
- Genus: Ennomosia
- Species: E. atribasalis

Binomial name
- Ennomosia atribasalis (Hampson, 1918)

Synonyms
- Furcivena atribasalis Hampson, 1918

Species of moth

Ennomosia atribasalis is a moth in the family Crambidae. It is found in Peru.
