= Ennomosia basalis =

Scientific classification
- Kingdom: Animalia
- Phylum: Arthropoda
- Class: Insecta
- Order: Lepidoptera
- Family: Crambidae
- Genus: Ennomosia
- Species: E. basalis

Binomial name
- Ennomosia basalis (Hampson, 1897)

Synonyms
- Clupeosoma basalis Hampson, 1897

Species of moth

Ennomosia basalis is a moth in the family Crambidae. It was described by George Hampson in 1897. It is found on the Antilles, where it has been recorded from Barbados.
