= Pseudognathobotys =

Scientific classification
- Domain: Eukaryota
- Kingdom: Animalia
- Phylum: Arthropoda
- Class: Insecta
- Order: Lepidoptera
- Family: Crambidae
- Subfamily: Spilomelinae
- Genus: Pseudognathobotys; Maes, 2001

Genus of moths

Pseudognathobotys is a genus of moths of the family Crambidae. They are found in the Afrotropical region, having been first discovered in 2001.

== Species ==
- Pseudognathobotys africalis Maes, 2001
- Pseudognathobotys diffusalis Maes, 2001
