= Pseudognathobotys africalis =

Scientific classification
- Domain: Eukaryota
- Kingdom: Animalia
- Phylum: Arthropoda
- Class: Insecta
- Order: Lepidoptera
- Family: Crambidae
- Genus: Pseudognathobotys
- Species: P. africalis

Binomial name
- Pseudognathobotys africalis Maes, 2001

Species of moth

Pseudognathobotys africalis is a moth in the family Crambidae. It was described by Koen V. N. Maes in 2001. It is found in the Democratic Republic of the Congo (North Kivu) and Uganda.
