= Loxoneptera carnealis =

Scientific classification
- Kingdom: Animalia
- Phylum: Arthropoda
- Class: Insecta
- Order: Lepidoptera
- Family: Crambidae
- Genus: Loxoneptera
- Species: L. carnealis

Binomial name
- Loxoneptera carnealis Hampson, 1896

Species of moth

Loxoneptera carnealis is a moth in the family Crambidae. It was described by George Hampson in 1896. It is found in northern India.
