= Loxoneptera =

Scientific classification
- Kingdom: Animalia
- Phylum: Arthropoda
- Class: Insecta
- Order: Lepidoptera
- Family: Crambidae
- Subfamily: Pyraustinae
- Genus: Loxoneptera; Hampson, 1896

Genus of moths

Loxoneptera is a genus of moths of the family Crambidae.

== Species ==
- Loxoneptera albicostalis Swinhoe, 1906
- Loxoneptera carnealis Hampson, 1896
