= Loxoneptera albicostalis =

Scientific classification
- Domain: Eukaryota
- Kingdom: Animalia
- Phylum: Arthropoda
- Class: Insecta
- Order: Lepidoptera
- Family: Crambidae
- Genus: Loxoneptera
- Species: L. albicostalis

Binomial name
- Loxoneptera albicostalis C. Swinhoe, 1906

Species of moth

Loxoneptera albicostalis is a moth in the family Crambidae. It was described by Charles Swinhoe in 1906. It is found on Sumatra in Indonesia.
