= Anarmodia inscriptalis =

Scientific classification
- Kingdom: Animalia
- Phylum: Arthropoda
- Class: Insecta
- Order: Lepidoptera
- Family: Crambidae
- Subfamily: Spilomelinae
- Tribe: Margaroniini
- Genus: Anarmodia
- Species: A. inscriptalis

Binomial name
- Anarmodia inscriptalis (Guenée, 1854)

Synonyms
- Megaphysa inscriptalis Guenée, 1854

Species of moth

Anarmodia inscriptalis is a moth in the family Crambidae. It was described by Achille Guenée in 1854. It is found in Ecuador.
