= Anarmodia damalis =

Scientific classification
- Kingdom: Animalia
- Phylum: Arthropoda
- Class: Insecta
- Order: Lepidoptera
- Family: Crambidae
- Subfamily: Spilomelinae
- Tribe: Margaroniini
- Genus: Anarmodia
- Species: A. damalis

Binomial name
- Anarmodia damalis (Guenée, 1854)

Synonyms
- Megaphysa damalis Guenée, 1854; Anarmodia clamalis

Species of moth

Anarmodia damalis is a moth in the family Crambidae. It was described by Achille Guenée in 1854. It is found in Brazil.
