= Anarmodia flaccidalis =

Scientific classification
- Kingdom: Animalia
- Phylum: Arthropoda
- Class: Insecta
- Order: Lepidoptera
- Family: Crambidae
- Subfamily: Spilomelinae
- Tribe: Margaroniini
- Genus: Anarmodia
- Species: A. flaccidalis

Binomial name
- Anarmodia flaccidalis (Snellen, 1892)

Synonyms
- Atheropoda flaccidalis Snellen, 1892; Anarmodia croceiproctis Hampson, 1913

Species of moth

Anarmodia flaccidalis is a moth in the family Crambidae. It was described by Snellen in 1892. It is found in Peru.
