= Chrysophyllis =

Scientific classification
- Kingdom: Animalia
- Phylum: Arthropoda
- Clade: Pancrustacea
- Class: Insecta
- Order: Lepidoptera
- Family: Crambidae
- Tribe: Margaroniini
- Genus: Chrysophyllis; Meyrick, 1934
- Species: C. lucivaga

Binomial name
- Chrysophyllis lucivaga Meyrick, 1934

Genus of moths

Chrysophyllis is a genus of the grass moth family (Crambidae). It is monotypic, containing the single species Chrysophyllis lucivaga. This moth is very little known, having only been recorded once, before 1935. It belongs to the large grass moth subfamily Spilomelinae; at the time of its description, these were still included in subfamily Pyraustinae and the entire Crambidae was then merged with the snout moths (family Pyralidae). While its exact relationships are undetermined, it is believed to be a close relative of Talanga (but see below). Like these (and some other, unrelated, moths), the male genitalia of C. lucivaga feature a remarkably elongated aedeagus shaped like a bullwhip.

This moth is presumed to be endemic to Hiva Oa, in the Marquesas Islands of Polynesia. The only known specimen, a male, was collected on Kaava Ridge, about 750 m (2460 ft) ASL; it is now in the Bernice P. Bishop Museum, but the genitals have been extracted for examination and are mounted on a microscopic slide in the National Museum of Natural History collection (specimen USNM 25242).

It is a smallish moth with rather short antennae. Unlike many other Spilomelinae, the wings lack translucent areas. Characteristically, a bunch of hairs sticks out from under the labial palps. Of the remarkable genitals, the clasper's harpe is very wide and stubby, with a sclerotized (hardened) curved process emerging from the center. A similar feature is found at the tip of the sacculus, which by itself is only slightly sclerotized. The cucullus is rounded, and a bunch of bristles is located inside the base of the costa. The uncus forms another long, slim and curved process. The vinculum is rounded, the tegumen longish with a truncated hind end, and the anellus is a sclerotized plate, also curved and slender. The striking aedeagus is shaped like a coiled whip, consisting of a long and tapering "thong" and ending in a shorter and thin "fall" section.

The function of this structure during copulation is unknown. However, there are a few moths with similarly elongated whip-like aedeagi, and in these the female's ductus bursae is long and coiled to accommodate the aedeagus.

A similar aedeagus is known from South Asian moths of the genus Talanga, which are suspected to be closely related. In the same general region, at least some species of Pygospila (e.g. the type species P. tyres, a widespread Australasian moth) show a similar development. But the moths of the Marquesas Islands also contain a number of American species, and it may be from among these rather than Australasian stock that Chrysophyllis evolved. Elongated aeadagi are known or suspected in certain Diaphania and perhaps Stemorrhages and maybe some other grass moths of the Americas. Other than in all these Spilomelinae, a whip-like aedeagus is apparently unknown except from the unrelated Arrhenophanidae, which unlike the rather advanced grass moths are tiny animals, among the most primitive of the Ditrysia.

Nothing is known about this species' ecology. It is most likely that it occurs in the more or less densely wooded habitat of upland Hiva Oa. This features species like for example Bidens henryi, Cheirodendron bastardianum, Pandanus, and east Polynesian blueberry (Vaccinium cereum), in addition to numerous other shrubs, ferns, mosses and lichens.
