= Anarmodia remotalis =

Scientific classification
- Kingdom: Animalia
- Phylum: Arthropoda
- Class: Insecta
- Order: Lepidoptera
- Family: Crambidae
- Subfamily: Spilomelinae
- Tribe: Margaroniini
- Genus: Anarmodia
- Species: A. remotalis

Binomial name
- Anarmodia remotalis Dognin, 1903

Species of moth

Anarmodia remotalis is a moth in the family Crambidae. It was described by Paul Dognin in 1903. It is found in Ecuador.
