= Anarmodia remusalis =

Scientific classification
- Kingdom: Animalia
- Phylum: Arthropoda
- Class: Insecta
- Order: Lepidoptera
- Family: Crambidae
- Subfamily: Spilomelinae
- Tribe: Margaroniini
- Genus: Anarmodia
- Species: A. remusalis

Binomial name
- Anarmodia remusalis (Walker, 1859)

Synonyms
- Botys remusalis Walker, 1859

Species of moth

Anarmodia remusalis is a moth in the family Crambidae. It was described by Francis Walker in 1859. It is found in Colombia.
