= Tessema sensilis =

Scientific classification
- Kingdom: Animalia
- Phylum: Arthropoda
- Clade: Pancrustacea
- Class: Insecta
- Order: Lepidoptera
- Family: Crambidae
- Subfamily: Spilomelinae
- Tribe: Margaroniini
- Genus: Tessema; J.F.G.Clarke, 1986
- Species: T. sensilis

Binomial name
- Tessema sensilis J.F.G.Clarke, 1986

Species of moth

Tessema sensilis is a little-known moth species, the only member of genus Tessema. It belongs to the grass moth family (Crambidae), and therein to the large subfamily Spilomelinae; at the time of its description, these were still included in subfamily Pyraustinae and the entire Crambidae was then merged with the snout moths (family Pyralidae). While its detailed relationships are undetermined, it may be a close relative of Herpetogramma and/or Pilocrocis.

Though there is no particular reason to assume it is very rare, this moth is inconspicuous and has in fact only been recorded a single time so far, on January 23, 1968; it took almost 20 years to realize it was a new and distinct animal. It inhabits the island of Nuku Hiva, in the Marquesas Islands of Polynesia, where it may be endemic. The holotype and only specimen (USNM 100735, genitalia on microscopic slide USNM 25220) was collected on Tunoa Ridge about 885 m (2900 ft) ASL, near the scenic lookout at 8°51′25″S 140°11′00″W.

== Description and ecology ==
T. sensilis is a smallish smooth-bodied and notably long-legged moth, mid-sized by grass moth standards with a wingspan of 39 mm in the only known specimen. It is mostly a medium yellowish-brown in color, and in the details closely resembles Herpetogramma fimbrialis, and somewhat less so such species as Palpita cupripennalis and Glyphodes argyritis.

The head is slightly scaly, with a well-developed proboscis and squamiform labial palps, which are white on the underside; the small maxillary palps are simple knobs which project forward. Its greyish antennae have brownish spots at the base and – at least in the male – are long (almost 2 cm each) and hairy. Between the antenna bases and the compound eyes there is a small crescent of white scales on each side. The tegula has buff scales at the hind end. The abdomen is reddish-grey, but the 8th segment is white in the front part, reddish in the hind part. The end of the abdomen bears a tuft of elongated scales which are buff with reddish tips above, and entirely reddish below. The underside of the body is white. The legs are white at the base, shading to brownish on the femur (forelegs) or tibia (mid- and hindlegs).

The straight-margined forewings have a somewhat drawn-out but blunt tip and 12 veins. Of the latter, lb and 2 are single, 3-5 approach at their base, 5-7 run somewhat parallel and not far apart from each other, 8 and 9 have a long stalk leading to wingtip or leading edge, respectively; the 10th vein anastomoses with the stalks of the preceding two, the 11th attaches to the outer fourth of the wing cell, and the 12th from its base. The hindwings are somewhat angular too, and have 8 veins. Of these, the first two run singly, while 3-5 approach, 6 and 7 join, and 7 and 8 anastomose at their bases. The only mark on the yellowish-brown wings is a short reddish transverse dash at the outer end of the forewing cell.

Altogether, the most conspicuous differences from H. fimbrialis are the markedly shorter legs and antennae of the latter, as well as its white abdominal tuft. In addition, H. fimbrialis has upturned (not squamiform) labial palps and stalked (not anastomosing) hindwing veins 7 and 8.

The male genitalia of T. sensilis are symmetrical and overall only lightly sclerotized (hardened) except for the stout aedeagus, which has a heavily sclerotized rod on the underside. Gnathos and socius are absent. The uncus is slender, curved, dilated, and covered in bristles at the tip. The clasper's harpe is barely sclerotized, forming a ridge on the costa, a narrow stripe on the sacculus, and a curved process emerging from the harpe's center; the cucullus is broadly rounded. The vinculum is broad and truncated, with a bulge in the middle; the tegumen is arched, and the anellus forms a small almost triangular plate with light sclerotized flanges at the hind sides. The female genitalia are of course still unknown.

Ecologically, essentially nothing is known about this species. Its habitat is likely light woodland rich in shrubs, ferns, mosses and lichens, but it may have been a vagrant from more or less densely wooded areas nearby. Plants recorded in or near the presumed habitat are for example Bidens henryi, Cheirodendron bastardianum, Glochidion ramiflorum, Metrosideros collina, Pandanus, and Vaccinium cereum.
