= Anarmodia glaucescens =

Scientific classification
- Kingdom: Animalia
- Phylum: Arthropoda
- Class: Insecta
- Order: Lepidoptera
- Family: Crambidae
- Subfamily: Spilomelinae
- Tribe: Margaroniini
- Genus: Anarmodia
- Species: A. glaucescens

Binomial name
- Anarmodia glaucescens Hampson, 1918

Species of moth

Anarmodia glaucescens is a moth in the family of Crambidae. It was described by George Hampson in 1918. It is found in Ecuador.
