= Anarmodia bistralis =

Scientific classification
- Kingdom: Animalia
- Phylum: Arthropoda
- Class: Insecta
- Order: Lepidoptera
- Family: Crambidae
- Subfamily: Spilomelinae
- Tribe: Margaroniini
- Genus: Anarmodia
- Species: A. bistralis

Binomial name
- Anarmodia bistralis (Guenée, 1854)

Synonyms
- Megaphysa bistralis Guenée, 1854; Anarmodia longinqualis Lederer, 1863; Anarmodia monjealis Schaus, 1924

Species of moth

Anarmodia bistralis is a moth in the family Crambidae. It was described by Achille Guenée in 1854. It is found in Colombia, Brazil, Venezuela and Ecuador.
