= Anarmodia corylalis =

Scientific classification
- Kingdom: Animalia
- Phylum: Arthropoda
- Class: Insecta
- Order: Lepidoptera
- Family: Crambidae
- Subfamily: Spilomelinae
- Tribe: Margaroniini
- Genus: Anarmodia
- Species: A. corylalis

Binomial name
- Anarmodia corylalis (Guenée, 1854)

Synonyms
- Megaphysa corylalis Guenée, 1854

Species of moth

Anarmodia corylalis is a moth in the family Crambidae. It was described by Achille Guenée in 1854. It is found in Colombia.
