= Anarmodia punctilinealis =

Scientific classification
- Kingdom: Animalia
- Phylum: Arthropoda
- Class: Insecta
- Order: Lepidoptera
- Family: Crambidae
- Subfamily: Spilomelinae
- Tribe: Margaroniini
- Genus: Anarmodia
- Species: A. punctilinealis

Binomial name
- Anarmodia punctilinealis Hampson, 1899

Species of moth

Anarmodia punctilinealis is a moth in the family Crambidae. It was described by George Hampson in 1899. It is found in Ecuador.

The wingspan is about 50 mm. The forewings are fulvous yellow with a fuscous antemedial line and a curved series of postmedial black points on the veins. The basal area and inner area on the hindwings are paler.
