= Anarmodia repandalis =

Scientific classification
- Kingdom: Animalia
- Phylum: Arthropoda
- Class: Insecta
- Order: Lepidoptera
- Family: Crambidae
- Subfamily: Spilomelinae
- Tribe: Margaroniini
- Genus: Anarmodia
- Species: A. repandalis

Binomial name
- Anarmodia repandalis Schaus, 1924

Species of moth

Anarmodia repandalis is a moth in the family Crambidae. It was described by Schaus in 1924. It is found in Peru.
