= Anarmodia obliqualis =

Scientific classification
- Kingdom: Animalia
- Phylum: Arthropoda
- Class: Insecta
- Order: Lepidoptera
- Family: Crambidae
- Subfamily: Spilomelinae
- Tribe: Margaroniini
- Genus: Anarmodia
- Species: A. obliqualis

Binomial name
- Anarmodia obliqualis Hampson, 1913

Species of moth

Anarmodia obliqualis is a moth in the family Crambidae. It was described by George Hampson in 1913. It is found in Peru.
