= Anarmodia inflexalis =

Scientific classification
- Kingdom: Animalia
- Phylum: Arthropoda
- Class: Insecta
- Order: Lepidoptera
- Family: Crambidae
- Subfamily: Spilomelinae
- Tribe: Margaroniini
- Genus: Anarmodia
- Species: A. inflexalis

Binomial name
- Anarmodia inflexalis (Snellen, 1892)

Synonyms
- Atheropoda inflexalis Snellen, 1892; Atheropoda majoralis Lederer, 1863; Atheropoda pontealis Druce, 1895

Species of moth

Anarmodia inflexalis is a moth in the family Crambidae. It was described by Snellen in 1892. It is found in Brazil.
