= Aphytoceros lucusalis =

Scientific classification
- Kingdom: Animalia
- Phylum: Arthropoda
- Class: Insecta
- Order: Lepidoptera
- Family: Crambidae
- Genus: Aphytoceros
- Species: A. lucusalis

Binomial name
- Aphytoceros lucusalis (Walker, 1859)

Synonyms
- Botys lucusalis Walker, 1859; Botys histrionalis Lederer, 1863; Aphytoceros lucalis Munroe, 1968

Species of moth

Aphytoceros lucusalis is a moth in the family Crambidae. It was described by Francis Walker in 1859. It is found in Australia, where it has been recorded Queensland and New South Wales.

The wingspan is about 40 mm. This wings are transparent with a brown pattern.

The larvae possibly feed on Ficus species.
