= Liopasia rufalis =

Scientific classification
- Kingdom: Animalia
- Phylum: Arthropoda
- Class: Insecta
- Order: Lepidoptera
- Family: Crambidae
- Genus: Liopasia
- Species: L. rufalis

Binomial name
- Liopasia rufalis Hampson, 1913

Species of moth

Liopasia rufalis is a moth in the family Crambidae. It was described by George Hampson in 1913. It is found in Trinidad.
