= Megastes romula =

Scientific classification
- Kingdom: Animalia
- Phylum: Arthropoda
- Class: Insecta
- Order: Lepidoptera
- Family: Crambidae
- Genus: Megastes
- Species: M. romula

Binomial name
- Megastes romula Dyar, 1916

Species of moth

Megastes romula is a moth in the family Crambidae. It was described by Harrison Gray Dyar Jr. in 1916. It is found in Zacualpan, Mexico.
