= Liopasia anolopha =

Scientific classification
- Kingdom: Animalia
- Phylum: Arthropoda
- Class: Insecta
- Order: Lepidoptera
- Family: Crambidae
- Genus: Liopasia
- Species: L. anolopha

Binomial name
- Liopasia anolopha Munroe, 1963

Species of moth

Liopasia anolopha is a moth in the family Crambidae. It was described by Eugene G. Munroe in 1963. It is found in Ecuador.
