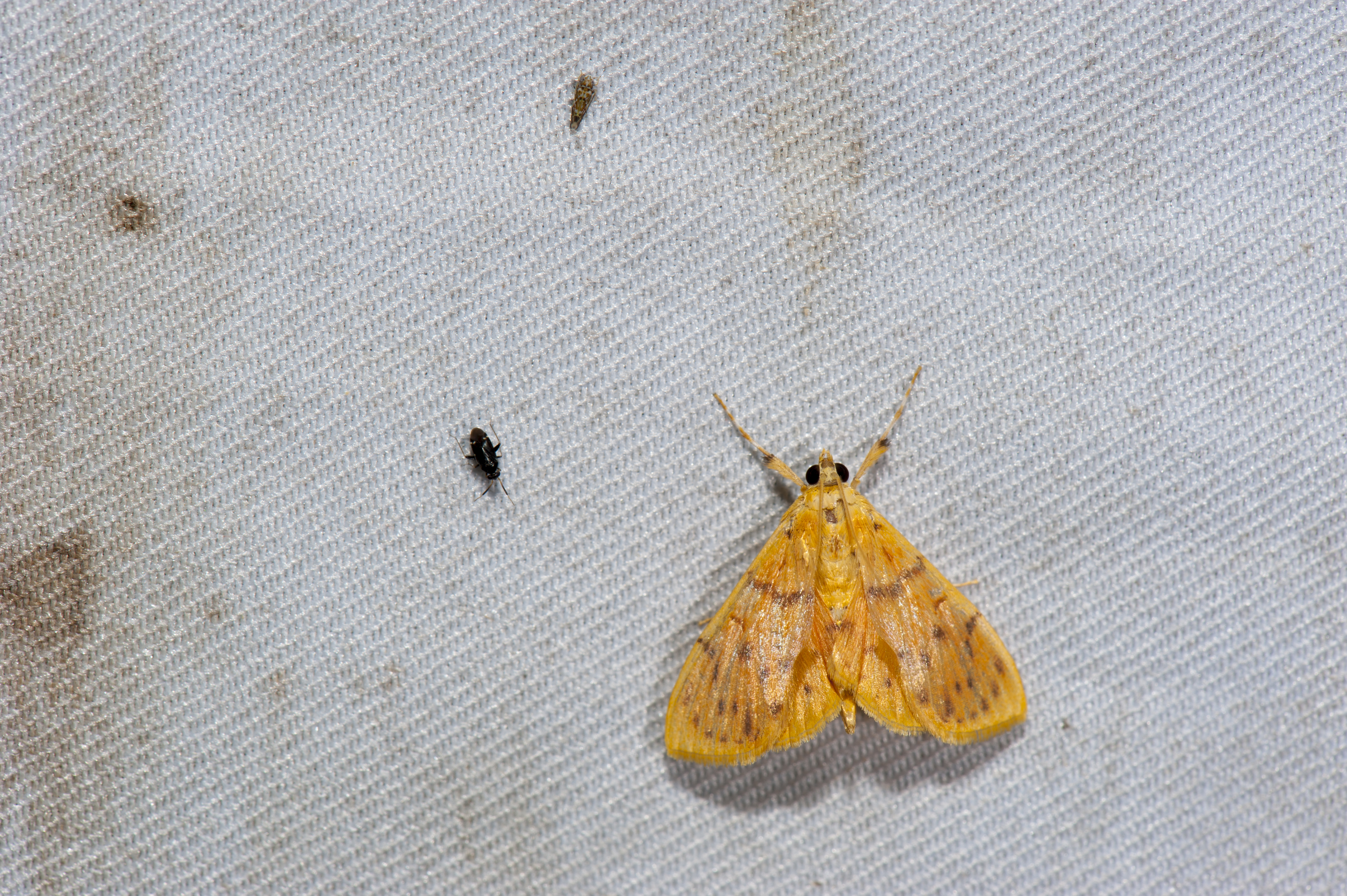

Scientific classification
- Kingdom: Animalia
- Phylum: Arthropoda
- Class: Insecta
- Order: Lepidoptera
- Family: Crambidae
- Genus: Eusabena
- Species: E. miltochristalis

Binomial name
- Eusabena miltochristalis (Hampson, 1896)

Synonyms
- Sameodes miltochristalis Hampson, 1896; Sameodes miltochristalis var. equicalcaralis Strand, 1918

= Eusabena miltochristalis =

Species of moth

Eusabena miltochristalis is a moth in the family Crambidae. It was first described in 1896 by George Hampson. It is found in north-eastern India, Myanmar and Taiwan.
