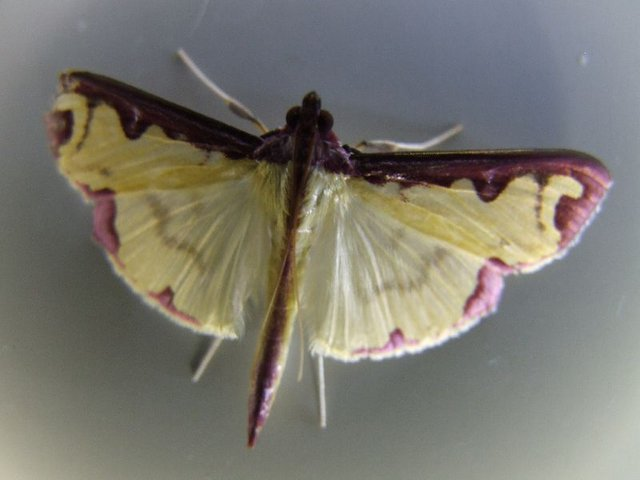

Scientific classification
- Kingdom: Animalia
- Phylum: Arthropoda
- Class: Insecta
- Order: Lepidoptera
- Family: Crambidae
- Tribe: Margaroniini
- Genus: Cadarena; Moore, 1886
- Species: C. pudoraria

Binomial name
- Cadarena pudoraria (Hübner, 1825)

Synonyms
- Generic: Cadarina; Idalia Hübner, 1825; Idalia Hübner, 1819; Specific: Idalia pudoraria Hübner, 1825; Phalaena Geometra marginata Stoll in Cramer & Stoll, 1782; Botys marginalis Guenée, 1854; Phalaena sinuata Fabricius, 1781

= Cadarena =

Genus of moths

Cadarena is a monotypic moth genus of the family Crambidae erected by Frederic Moore in 1886. Its only species, Cadarena pudoraria, was first described by Jacob Hübner in 1825. It occurs throughout tropical and subtropical Africa and in India.

The adults of this species have a wingspan of around 40 millimetres (1.6 in).

A known larval food plants are of the genera Gossypium and Adenia and the species Sida rhombifolia.
