= Compacta nigrolinealis =

Scientific classification
- Kingdom: Animalia
- Phylum: Arthropoda
- Class: Insecta
- Order: Lepidoptera
- Family: Crambidae
- Genus: Compacta
- Species: C. nigrolinealis

Binomial name
- Compacta nigrolinealis (Warren, 1892)

Synonyms
- Aphytoceros nigrolinealis Warren, 1892

Species of moth

Compacta nigrolinealis is a moth in the family Crambidae. It was described by Warren in 1892. It is found in Argentina.
