= Syngamilyta samarialis =

Scientific classification
- Kingdom: Animalia
- Phylum: Arthropoda
- Class: Insecta
- Order: Lepidoptera
- Family: Crambidae
- Genus: Syngamilyta
- Species: S. samarialis

Binomial name
- Syngamilyta samarialis (H. Druce, 1899)

Synonyms
- Aphytoceros samarialis H. Druce, 1899; Syngamia fulviplaga Dognin, 1911

Species of moth

Syngamilyta samarialis is a moth in the family Crambidae. It was described by Herbert Druce in 1899. It is found in Costa Rica and Colombia.

The forewings are semihyaline white, with a dark reddish-brown base and crossed by two fine metallic blue lines, as well as a broad reddish-brown band, darker near the anal angle, crossing the wing beyond the cell from the costal to the inner margin, the outer margin slightly clouded with brown. The hindwings are semihyaline white, crossed about the middle from the costal to the inner margin by a fine brown line, the apex, anal angle and inner margin are clouded with reddish brown. The marginal line is white.
