= Megastes septentrionis =

Scientific classification
- Kingdom: Animalia
- Phylum: Arthropoda
- Class: Insecta
- Order: Lepidoptera
- Family: Crambidae
- Genus: Megastes
- Species: M. septentrionis

Binomial name
- Megastes septentrionis Hampson, 1913

Species of moth

Megastes septentrionis is a moth in the family Crambidae. It was described by George Hampson in 1913. It is found in Xalapa in Mexico and in Guatemala.
