= Megaphysa =

Scientific classification
- Domain: Eukaryota
- Kingdom: Animalia
- Phylum: Arthropoda
- Class: Insecta
- Order: Lepidoptera
- Family: Crambidae
- Tribe: Margaroniini
- Genus: Megaphysa; Guenée, 1854
- Species: M. herbiferalis

Binomial name
- Megaphysa herbiferalis Guenée, 1854

Genus of moths

Megaphysa is a monotypic moth genus of the family Crambidae described by Achille Guenée in 1854. It contains only one species, Megaphysa herbiferalis, described by the same author in the same year, which is found in Colombia and Ecuador.
