= Glyphodella vadonalis =

Scientific classification
- Kingdom: Animalia
- Phylum: Arthropoda
- Class: Insecta
- Order: Lepidoptera
- Family: Crambidae
- Genus: Glyphodella
- Species: G. vadonalis

Binomial name
- Glyphodella vadonalis (Viette, 1958)

Synonyms
- Diastictis vadonalis Viette, 1958

Species of moth

Glyphodella vadonalis is a moth in the family Crambidae. It was described by Pierre Viette in 1958. It is found on Madagascar.

This species has a wingspan of 15–16 mm and a wing length of 7-7.5 mm. The forewings are brownish with two larger and some smaller hyaline (glass-like) spots. The hindwings brownish with two larger, connected, hyaline spots.
