= Megastes brunnealis =

Scientific classification
- Kingdom: Animalia
- Phylum: Arthropoda
- Class: Insecta
- Order: Lepidoptera
- Family: Crambidae
- Genus: Megastes
- Species: M. brunnealis

Binomial name
- Megastes brunnealis Hampson, 1913

Species of moth

Megastes brunnealis is a moth in the family Crambidae. It was described by George Hampson in 1913. It is found in Jamaica.
