= Loxmaionia =

Scientific classification
- Kingdom: Animalia
- Phylum: Arthropoda
- Class: Insecta
- Order: Lepidoptera
- Family: Crambidae
- Tribe: Margaroniini
- Genus: Loxmaionia; Schaus, 1913
- Species: L. megale

Binomial name
- Loxmaionia megale Schaus, 1913

Genus of moths

Loxmaionia is a genus of moths of the family Crambidae. It contains only one species, Loxmaionia megale, which is found in Costa Rica.

The wingspan is about 49 mm. The forewings are dark greyish brown with interrupted basal and antemedial whitish lines. There is a small white spot in the cell medially and a similar short streak below the cell, as well as an oblique whitish line on the discocellular and an interrupted line below it to the inner margin. The hindwings are semihyaline white with a fuscous-grey shade on the inner margin.
