= Meroctena dichocrosialis =

Scientific classification
- Kingdom: Animalia
- Phylum: Arthropoda
- Class: Insecta
- Order: Lepidoptera
- Family: Crambidae
- Genus: Meroctena
- Species: M. dichocrosialis

Binomial name
- Meroctena dichocrosialis Hampson, 1899

Species of moth

Meroctena dichocrosialis is a moth in the family Crambidae. It was described by George Hampson in 1899. It is found in Bali, Indonesia.
