= Radessa =

Scientific classification
- Domain: Eukaryota
- Kingdom: Animalia
- Phylum: Arthropoda
- Class: Insecta
- Order: Lepidoptera
- Family: Crambidae
- Subfamily: Spilomelinae
- Tribe: Margaroniini
- Genus: Radessa; Munroe, 1977

Genus of moths

Radessa is a genus of moths of the family Crambidae.

== Species ==
- Radessa pardalota Munroe, 1977
- Radessa vittilimbalis Munroe, 1977
