= Compacta hirtalis =

Scientific classification
- Kingdom: Animalia
- Phylum: Arthropoda
- Class: Insecta
- Order: Lepidoptera
- Family: Crambidae
- Genus: Compacta
- Species: C. hirtalis

Binomial name
- Compacta hirtalis (Guenée, 1854)

Synonyms
- Botys hirtalis Guenée, 1854; Botys amatalis Walker, 1859; Botys lybialis Walker, 1859

Species of moth

Compacta hirtalis is a moth in the family Crambidae. It was described by Achille Guenée in 1854. It is found from the southern United States, where it has been recorded from Arizona and Texas, south through Central America (including Costa Rica and Honduras) to South America, including French Guiana and Brazil.

The wingspan is about 21 mm. Adults have been recorded on wing in June and August in the United States.
