= Liopasia maculifimbria =

Scientific classification
- Kingdom: Animalia
- Phylum: Arthropoda
- Class: Insecta
- Order: Lepidoptera
- Family: Crambidae
- Genus: Liopasia
- Species: L. maculifimbria

Binomial name
- Liopasia maculifimbria Dyar, 1914

Species of moth

Liopasia maculifimbria is a moth in the family Crambidae. It was described by Harrison Gray Dyar Jr. in 1914. It is found in Mexico.
