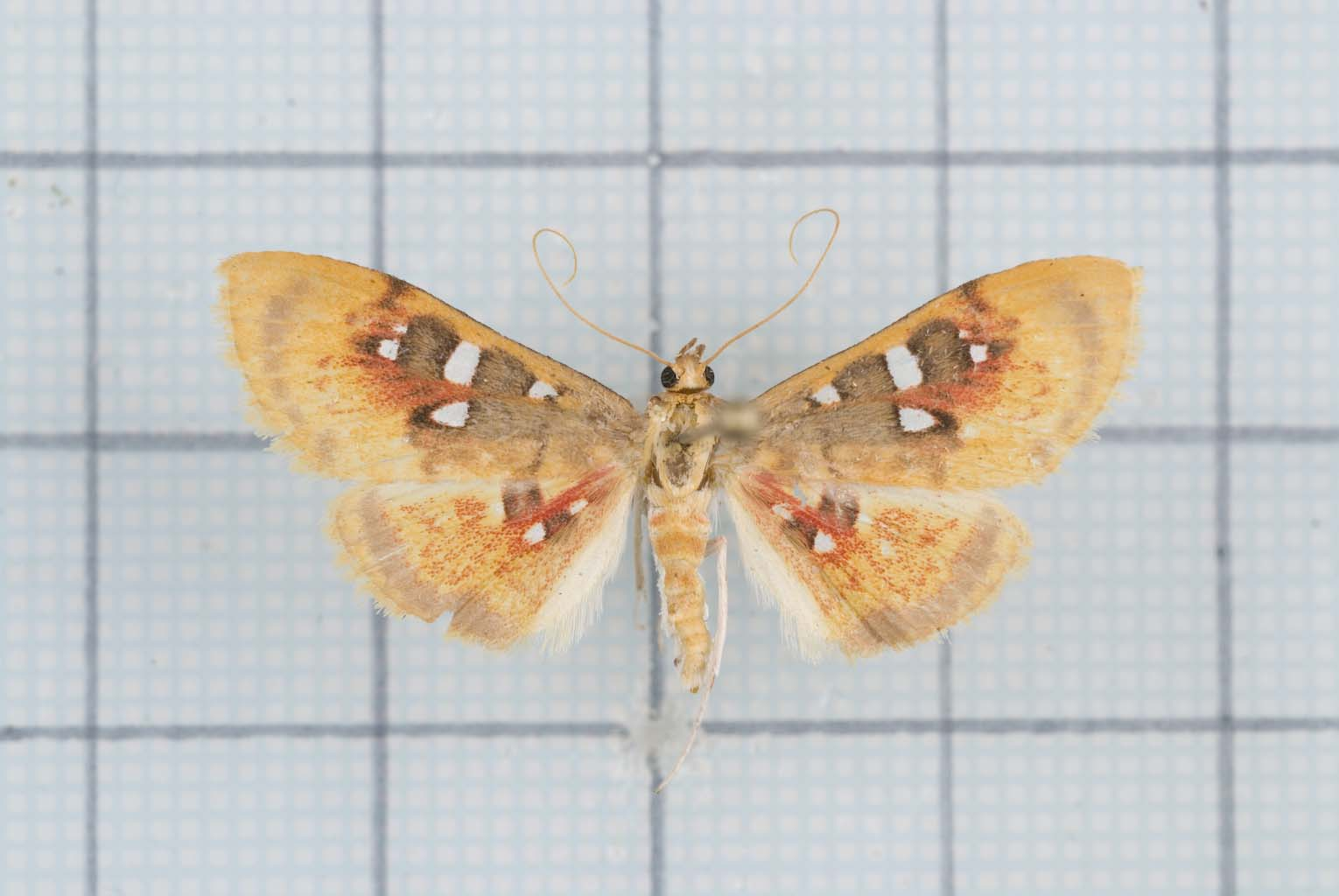

Scientific classification
- Kingdom: Animalia
- Phylum: Arthropoda
- Class: Insecta
- Order: Lepidoptera
- Family: Crambidae
- Genus: Eusabena
- Species: E. monostictalis

Binomial name
- Eusabena monostictalis (Hampson, 1899)

Synonyms
- Sameodes monostictalis Hampson, 1899

= Eusabena monostictalis =

Species of moth

Eusabena monostictalis is a moth in the family Crambidae. It was described by George Hampson in 1899. It is found on Ambon Island in Indonesia as well as Queensland in Australia.
