= Syngamilyta pretiosalis =

Scientific classification
- Kingdom: Animalia
- Phylum: Arthropoda
- Class: Insecta
- Order: Lepidoptera
- Family: Crambidae
- Genus: Syngamilyta
- Species: S. pretiosalis

Binomial name
- Syngamilyta pretiosalis (Schaus, 1912)

Synonyms
- Trithyris pretiosalis Schaus, 1912

Species of moth

Syngamilyta pretiosalis is a moth in the family Crambidae. It was described by Schaus in 1912. It is found in Costa Rica, French Guiana and Brazil.
