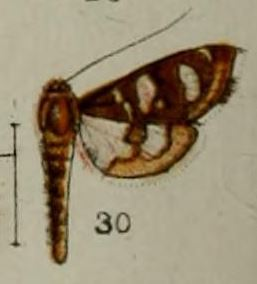

Scientific classification
- Kingdom: Animalia
- Phylum: Arthropoda
- Clade: Pancrustacea
- Class: Insecta
- Order: Lepidoptera
- Family: Crambidae
- Genus: Glyphodella
- Species: G. flavibrunnea

Binomial name
- Glyphodella flavibrunnea (Hampson, 1899)

Synonyms
- Bocchoris flavibrunnea Hampson, 1899

= Glyphodella flavibrunnea =

Species of moth

Glyphodella flavibrunnea is a moth in the family Crambidae. It was described by George Hampson in 1899. It is found in the Democratic Republic of the Congo (Maniema), Madagascar and South Africa (KwaZulu-Natal).
