= Liopasia puseyalis =

Scientific classification
- Kingdom: Animalia
- Phylum: Arthropoda
- Class: Insecta
- Order: Lepidoptera
- Family: Crambidae
- Genus: Liopasia
- Species: L. puseyalis

Binomial name
- Liopasia puseyalis Schaus, 1920

Species of moth

Liopasia puseyalis is a moth in the family Crambidae. It was described by Schaus in 1920. It is found in Peru.
