= Syngamilyta nympha =

Scientific classification
- Kingdom: Animalia
- Phylum: Arthropoda
- Class: Insecta
- Order: Lepidoptera
- Family: Crambidae
- Genus: Syngamilyta
- Species: S. nympha

Binomial name
- Syngamilyta nympha Munroe, 1960

Species of moth

Syngamilyta nympha is a moth in the family Crambidae. It was described by Eugene G. Munroe in 1960. It is found in Bolivia.
