= Megastes olivalis =

Scientific classification
- Kingdom: Animalia
- Phylum: Arthropoda
- Class: Insecta
- Order: Lepidoptera
- Family: Crambidae
- Genus: Megastes
- Species: M. olivalis

Binomial name
- Megastes olivalis Schaus, 1924

Species of moth

Megastes olivalis is a moth in the family Crambidae. It was described by Schaus in 1924. It is found in Paraguay.
