= Megastes brunnettalis =

Scientific classification
- Kingdom: Animalia
- Phylum: Arthropoda
- Class: Insecta
- Order: Lepidoptera
- Family: Crambidae
- Genus: Megastes
- Species: M. brunnettalis

Binomial name
- Megastes brunnettalis (Dyar, 1912)

Synonyms
- Omphisa brunnettalis Dyar, 1912

Species of moth

Megastes brunnettalis is a moth in the family Crambidae. It was described by Harrison Gray Dyar Jr. in 1912. It is found in Zacualpan, Mexico.
