= Colomychus florepicta =

Scientific classification
- Kingdom: Animalia
- Phylum: Arthropoda
- Class: Insecta
- Order: Lepidoptera
- Family: Crambidae
- Genus: Colomychus
- Species: C. florepicta

Binomial name
- Colomychus florepicta (Dyar, 1914)

Synonyms
- Syngamia florepicta Dyar, 1914

Species of moth

Colomychus florepicta is a moth in the family Crambidae. It was described by Harrison Gray Dyar Jr. in 1914. It is found in San Luis Potosí, Mexico.

The wingspan is about 18 mm. The wings are rose pink with pale yellow patches edged by dark lines. The forewings with a small hyaline-white spot near the base of the cell, as well as a double yellow patch. The hindwings have a broad median band, widening in its central third, leaving a narrow rose-pink margin. There is a white-hyaline spot in the cell.
