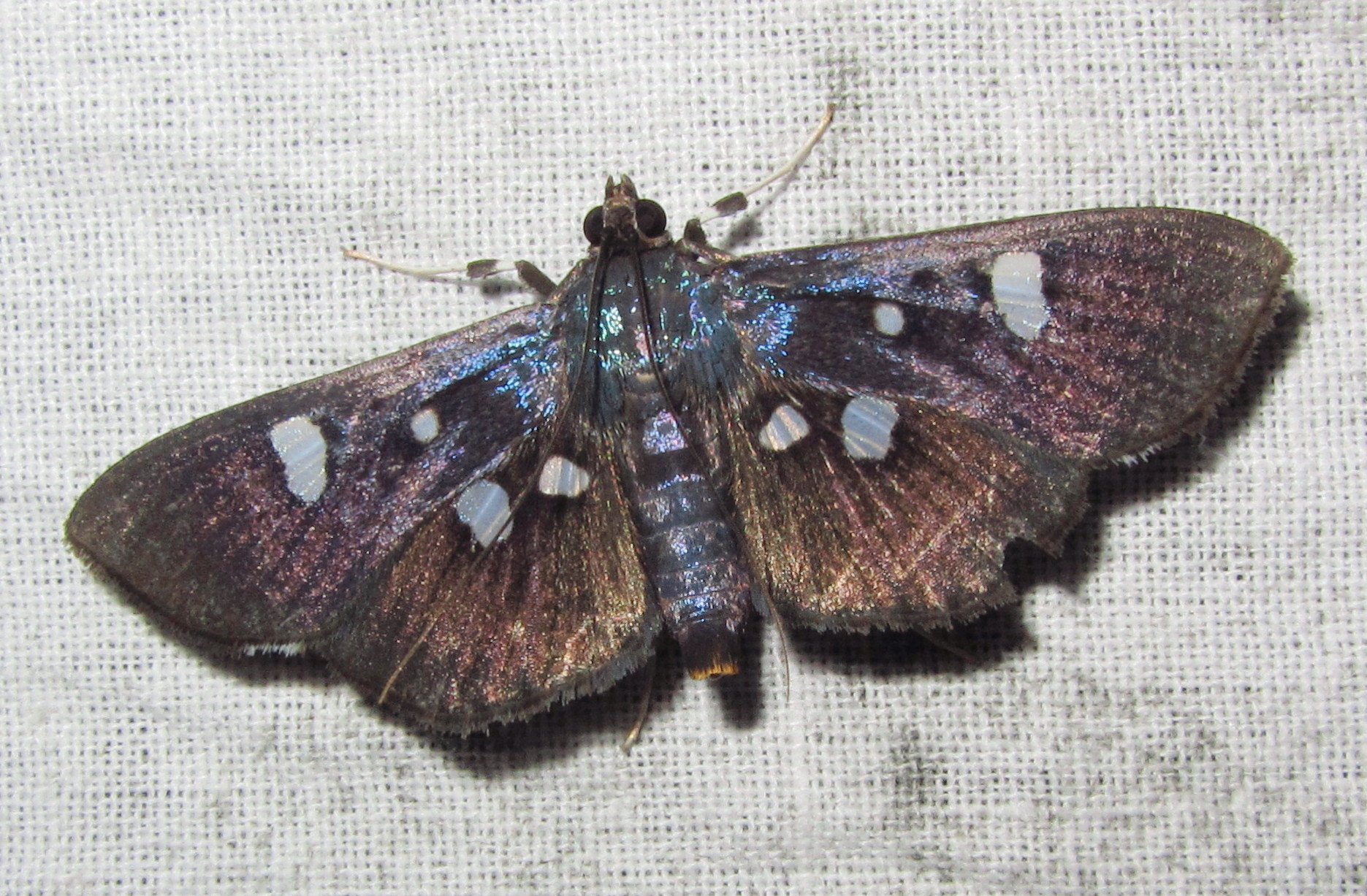

Scientific classification
- Kingdom: Animalia
- Phylum: Arthropoda
- Class: Insecta
- Order: Lepidoptera
- Family: Crambidae
- Genus: Rhagoba
- Species: R. octomaculalis

Binomial name
- Rhagoba octomaculalis (Moore, 1867)

Synonyms
- Filodes octomaculalis Moore, 1867; Pygospila octomaculalis; Rhagoba bimaculata Moore, 1888

= Rhagoba octomaculalis =

Species of moth

Rhagoba octomaculalis is a moth in the family Crambidae. It was described by Frederic Moore in 1867. It is found in India (Sikkim, Darjeeling, Arunachal Pradesh).

Adults are dark fuliginous black, with the base of the forewings metallic blue. It is a somewhat variable species. In some specimens, each wing is marked with two transparent white spots, while in others only with one, and in still others the spot of the hindwings is also missing.
