= Aphytoceros =

Scientific classification
- Kingdom: Animalia
- Phylum: Arthropoda
- Class: Insecta
- Order: Lepidoptera
- Family: Crambidae
- Tribe: Margaroniini
- Genus: Aphytoceros; Meyrick, 1884

Genus of moths

Aphytoceros is a genus of moths of the family Crambidae.

== Species ==
- Aphytoceros hollandiae Munroe, 1968
- Aphytoceros lucusalis (Walker, 1859)
- Aphytoceros subflavalis Swinhoe, 1917
