= Alytana =

Scientific classification
- Kingdom: Animalia
- Phylum: Arthropoda
- Clade: Pancrustacea
- Class: Insecta
- Order: Lepidoptera
- Superfamily: Pyraloidea
- Family: Crambidae
- Subfamily: Spilomelinae
- Tribe: Margaroniini
- Genus: Alytana; J. C. Shaffer & Munroe, 2007

Genus of moths

Alytana is a genus of African moths of the family Crambidae. It was described by Jay C. Shaffer and Eugene G. Munroe in 2007.

The genus currently contains three species:

- Alytana aldabralis (Viette, 1958) – present on the Seychelles
- Alytana bifurcalis Seizmair, 2019 – present in Oman
- Alytana calligrammalis (Mabille, 1879) – present on Madagascar

The caterpillars of A. aldabralis bore into the fruits of Ficus lutea (Moraceae), where they feed.
