= Liopasia =

Scientific classification
- Kingdom: Animalia
- Phylum: Arthropoda
- Clade: Pancrustacea
- Class: Insecta
- Order: Lepidoptera
- Family: Crambidae
- Subfamily: Spilomelinae
- Tribe: Margaroniini
- Genus: Liopasia; Möschler, 1882

Synonyms
- Dichotis Warren, 1892; Terastiodes Warren, 1892

Genus of moths

Liopasia are a genus of moths of the family Crambidae.

== Species ==
- Liopasia andrealis Dognin, 1910
- Liopasia anolopha Munroe, 1963
- Liopasia apicenotata Hampson, 1918
- Liopasia dorsalis Hampson, 1899
- Liopasia leucoperalis Hampson, 1918
- Liopasia maculifimbria Dyar, 1914
- Liopasia meridionalis Schaus, 1920
- Liopasia ochracealis (Walker, 1866)
- Liopasia purpurealis Schaus, 1924
- Liopasia puseyalis Schaus, 1920
- Liopasia reliqualis Möschler, 1882
- Liopasia rufalis Hampson, 1913
- Liopasia simplicissimalis Dyar, 1914
- Liopasia surinamalis Schaus, 1920
- Liopasia teneralis (Lederer, 1863)
