= Syngamilyta =

Scientific classification
- Kingdom: Animalia
- Phylum: Arthropoda
- Class: Insecta
- Order: Lepidoptera
- Family: Crambidae
- Subfamily: Spilomelinae
- Tribe: Margaroniini
- Genus: Syngamilyta; Strand, 1920

Genus of moths

Syngamilyta is a genus of moths of the family Crambidae described by Embrik Strand in 1920.

== Species ==
- Syngamilyta apicolor (Druce, 1902)
- Syngamilyta nympha Munroe, 1960
- Syngamilyta pehlkei (E. Hering, 1906)
- Syngamilyta pretiosalis (Schaus, 1912)
- Syngamilyta samarialis (Druce, 1899)
