= Meroctena staintonii =

Scientific classification
- Kingdom: Animalia
- Phylum: Arthropoda
- Class: Insecta
- Order: Lepidoptera
- Family: Crambidae
- Genus: Meroctena
- Species: M. staintonii

Binomial name
- Meroctena staintonii Lederer, 1863

Synonyms
- Lygropis sirioxantha Meyrick, 1886

Species of moth

Meroctena staintonii is a moth in the family Crambidae. It was described by Julius Lederer in 1863. It is found in Indonesia (Ambon Island, Java, Borneo), Fiji and Australia, where it has been recorded from Queensland
