= Chrysothyridia invertalis =

Scientific classification
- Kingdom: Animalia
- Phylum: Arthropoda
- Class: Insecta
- Order: Lepidoptera
- Family: Crambidae
- Genus: Chrysothyridia
- Species: C. invertalis

Binomial name
- Chrysothyridia invertalis (Snellen, 1877)

Synonyms
- Gonocausta invertalis Snellen, 1877

Species of moth

Chrysothyridia invertalis is a moth in the family Crambidae. It was described by Snellen in 1877. It is found on Sulawesi, as well as in New Guinea and Australia, where it has been recorded from Queensland.
