= Anarmodia =

Scientific classification
- Kingdom: Animalia
- Phylum: Arthropoda
- Clade: Pancrustacea
- Class: Insecta
- Order: Lepidoptera
- Family: Crambidae
- Subfamily: Spilomelinae
- Tribe: Margaroniini
- Genus: Anarmodia; Lederer, 1863

Synonyms
- Asparagmia Amsel, 1956; Atheropoda Lederer, 1863; Aetheropoda Amsel, 1956

Genus of moths

Anarmodia is a genus of moths of the family Crambidae.

== Species ==
- Anarmodia arcadiusalis Schaus, 1924
- Anarmodia bistralis (Guenée, 1854)
- Anarmodia corylalis (Guenée, 1854)
- Anarmodia damalis (Guenée, 1854)
- Anarmodia elongalis Schaus, 1924
- Anarmodia flaccidalis (Snellen, 1892)
- Anarmodia glaucescens Hampson, 1918
- Anarmodia inferioralis (Guenée, 1854)
- Anarmodia inflexalis (Snellen, 1892)
- Anarmodia inscriptalis (Guenée, 1854)
- Anarmodia lojalis Schaus, 1924
- Anarmodia majoralis (Guenée, 1854)
- Anarmodia nebulosalis Dognin, 1903
- Anarmodia obliqualis Hampson, 1913
- Anarmodia pallidicostalis Dognin, 1903
- Anarmodia perfulvalis Dognin, 1903
- Anarmodia polystriata Hampson, 1913
- Anarmodia punctilinealis Hampson, 1899
- Anarmodia remotalis Dognin, 1903
- Anarmodia remusalis (Walker, 1859)
- Anarmodia repandalis Schaus, 1924
- Anarmodia salviusalis Schaus, 1924
- Anarmodia sibilalis (Guenée, 1854)
- Anarmodia tesselliferalis Hampson, 1918
