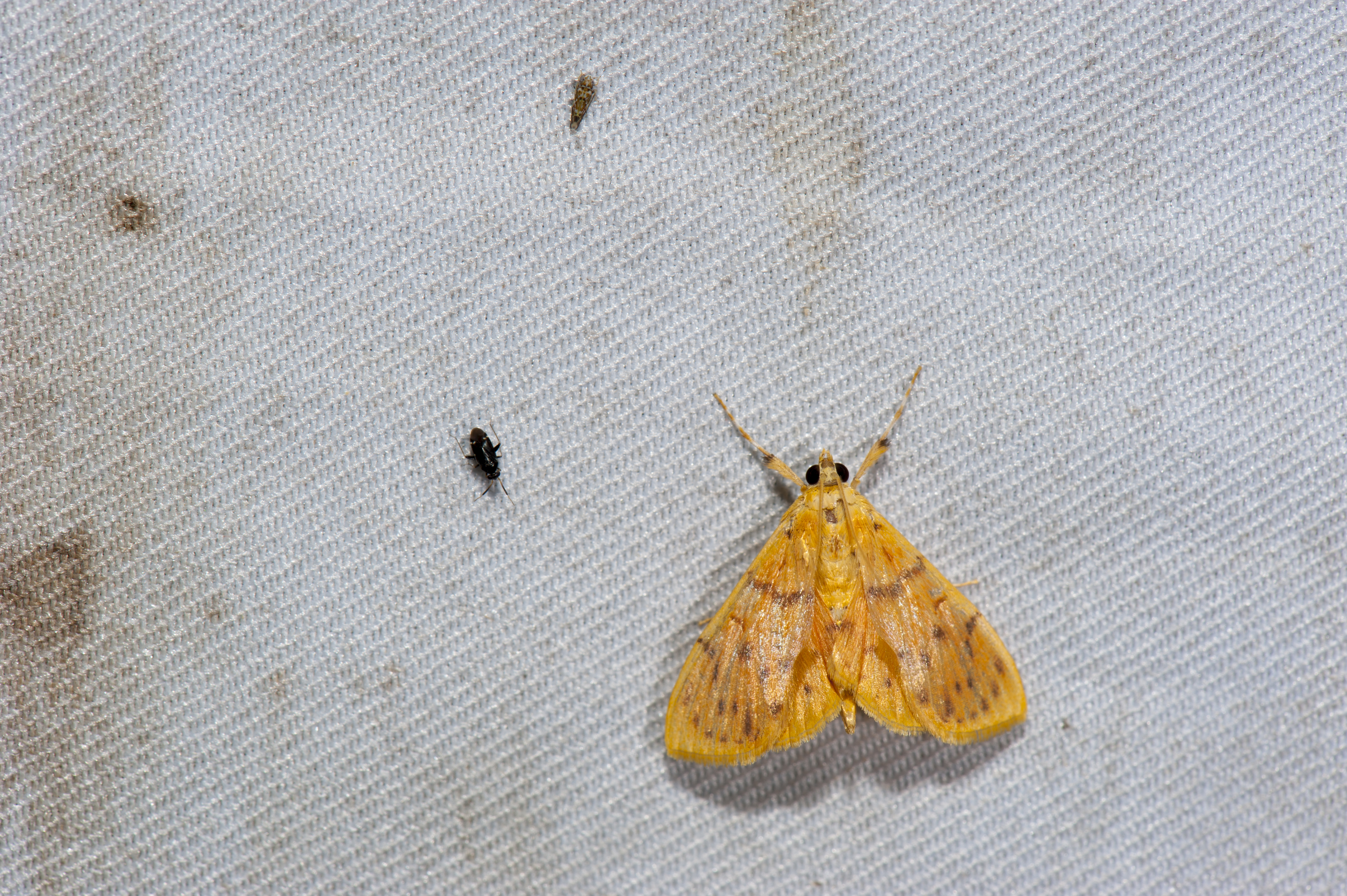
- Eusabena miltochristalis

Scientific classification
- Kingdom: Animalia
- Phylum: Arthropoda
- Class: Insecta
- Order: Lepidoptera
- Family: Crambidae
- Tribe: Margaroniini
- Genus: Eusabena; Snellen, 1901

= Eusabena =

Genus of moths

Eusabena is a genus of moths of the family Crambidae.

== Species ==
- Eusabena miltochristalis (Hampson, 1896)
- Eusabena monostictalis (Hampson, 1899)
- Eusabena paraphragma (Meyrick, 1889)
- Eusabena selinialis Snellen, 1901
