= Megastes australis =

Scientific classification
- Kingdom: Animalia
- Phylum: Arthropoda
- Class: Insecta
- Order: Lepidoptera
- Family: Crambidae
- Genus: Megastes
- Species: M. australis

Binomial name
- Megastes australis Munroe, 1963

Species of moth

Megastes australis is a moth in the family Crambidae. It was described by Eugene G. Munroe in 1963. It is found in Argentina.
