= Megastes major =

Scientific classification
- Kingdom: Animalia
- Phylum: Arthropoda
- Class: Insecta
- Order: Lepidoptera
- Family: Crambidae
- Genus: Megastes
- Species: M. major

Binomial name
- Megastes major Munroe, 1959

Species of moth

Megastes major is a moth in the family Crambidae. It was described by Eugene G. Munroe in 1959. It is found in Santa Catarina, Brazil.
