= Didymostoma =

Scientific classification
- Kingdom: Animalia
- Phylum: Arthropoda
- Class: Insecta
- Order: Lepidoptera
- Family: Crambidae
- Tribe: Margaroniini
- Genus: Didymostoma; Warren, 1892

Genus of moths

Didymostoma is a genus of moths of the family Crambidae.

== Species ==
- Didymostoma aurotinctalis (Hampson, 1898)
- Didymostoma euphranoralis Walker, 1859
