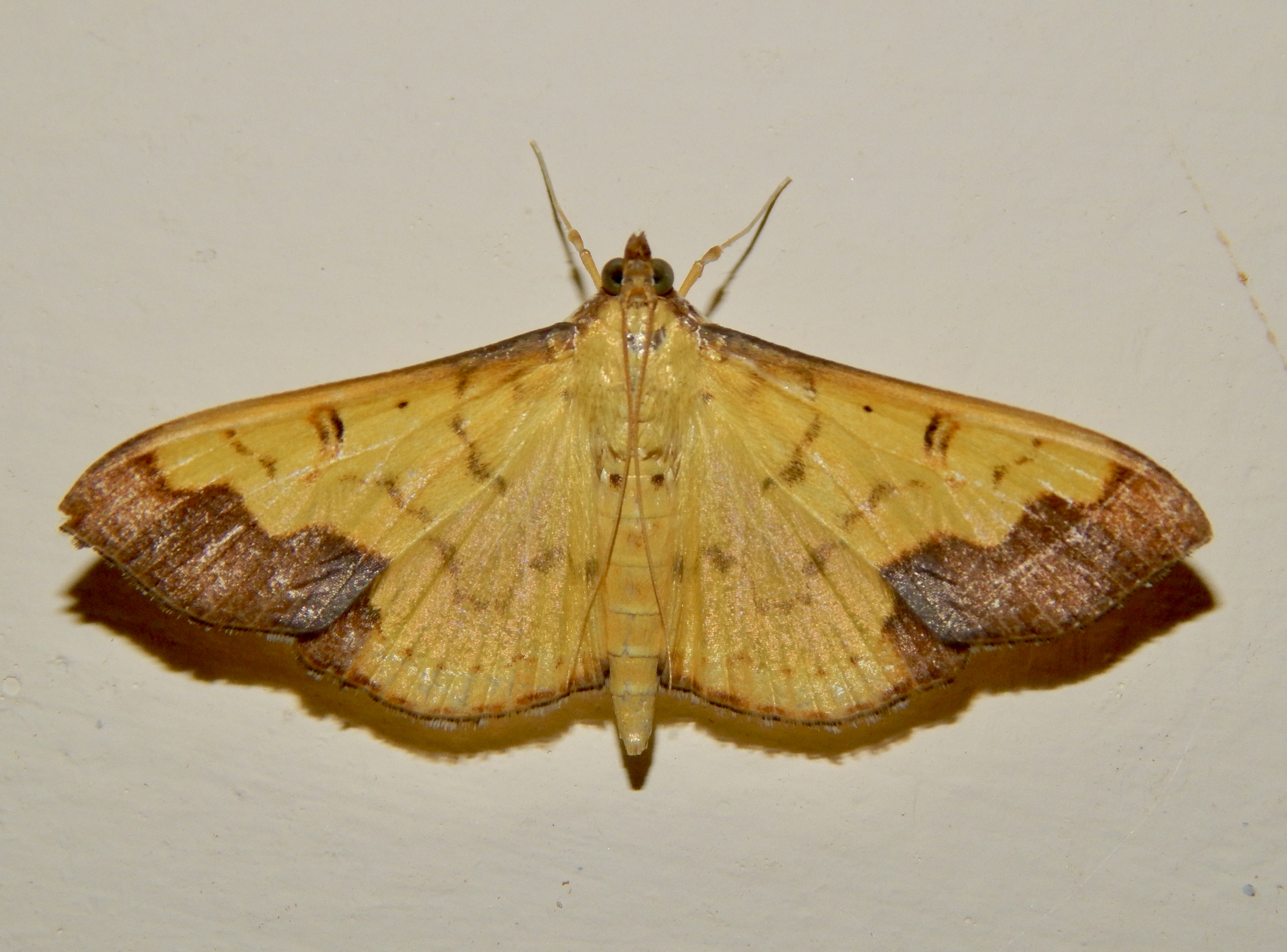

Scientific classification
- Kingdom: Animalia
- Phylum: Arthropoda
- Clade: Pancrustacea
- Class: Insecta
- Order: Lepidoptera
- Family: Crambidae
- Genus: Meroctena
- Species: M. tullalis

Binomial name
- Meroctena tullalis (Walker, 1859)

Synonyms
- Botys tullalis Walker, 1859

= Meroctena tullalis =

Species of moth

Meroctena tullalis is a moth in the family Crambidae. It was described by Francis Walker in 1859. It is found in what was then India (North Hindustan, Silhet) (now Bangladesh), Fiji and Samoa.
