= Megastes praxiteles =

Scientific classification
- Kingdom: Animalia
- Phylum: Arthropoda
- Class: Insecta
- Order: Lepidoptera
- Family: Crambidae
- Genus: Megastes
- Species: M. praxiteles

Binomial name
- Megastes praxiteles H. Druce, 1895

Species of moth

Megastes praxiteles is a moth in the family Crambidae. It was described by Herbert Druce in 1895. It is found in Morelos, Mexico.
