= Liopasia reliqualis =

Scientific classification
- Kingdom: Animalia
- Phylum: Arthropoda
- Class: Insecta
- Order: Lepidoptera
- Family: Crambidae
- Genus: Liopasia
- Species: L. reliqualis

Binomial name
- Liopasia reliqualis Möschler, 1882

Species of moth

Liopasia reliqualis is a moth in the family Crambidae. It was described by Heinrich Benno Möschler in 1882. It is found in Suriname.
