= Aphytoceros hollandiae =

Scientific classification
- Kingdom: Animalia
- Phylum: Arthropoda
- Class: Insecta
- Order: Lepidoptera
- Family: Crambidae
- Genus: Aphytoceros
- Species: A. hollandiae

Binomial name
- Aphytoceros hollandiae Munroe, 1968

Species of moth

Aphytoceros hollandiae is a moth in the family Crambidae. It was described by Eugene G. Munroe in 1968. It is found in Papua New Guinea.
