= Rhagoba obvellata =

Scientific classification
- Kingdom: Animalia
- Phylum: Arthropoda
- Class: Insecta
- Order: Lepidoptera
- Family: Crambidae
- Genus: Rhagoba
- Species: R. obvellata

Binomial name
- Rhagoba obvellata Du & Li, 2012

Species of moth

Rhagoba obvellata is a moth in the family Crambidae. It was described by Xi-Cui Du and Hou-Hun Li in 2012. It is found in Tibet, China.
