= Eusabena selinialis =

Scientific classification
- Kingdom: Animalia
- Phylum: Arthropoda
- Class: Insecta
- Order: Lepidoptera
- Family: Crambidae
- Genus: Eusabena
- Species: E. selinialis

Binomial name
- Eusabena selinialis Snellen, 1901

Species of moth

Eusabena selinialis is a moth in the family Crambidae. It was described by Snellen in 1901. It is found on Borneo.
