= Liopasia meridionalis =

Scientific classification
- Kingdom: Animalia
- Phylum: Arthropoda
- Class: Insecta
- Order: Lepidoptera
- Family: Crambidae
- Genus: Liopasia
- Species: L. meridionalis

Binomial name
- Liopasia meridionalis Schaus, 1920

Species of moth

Liopasia meridionalis is a moth in the family Crambidae. It was described by Schaus in 1920. It is found in Brazil (Paraná).
