= Glyphodella savyalis =

Scientific classification
- Kingdom: Animalia
- Phylum: Arthropoda
- Class: Insecta
- Order: Lepidoptera
- Family: Crambidae
- Genus: Glyphodella
- Species: G. savyalis

Binomial name
- Glyphodella savyalis (Legrand, 1966)

Synonyms
- Diastictis savyalis Legrand, 1966

Species of moth

Glyphodella savyalis is a moth in the family Crambidae. It was described by Henry Legrand in 1966. It is found on the Seychelles, where it has been recorded from Aldabra.
