= Megastes rosinalis =

Scientific classification
- Kingdom: Animalia
- Phylum: Arthropoda
- Class: Insecta
- Order: Lepidoptera
- Family: Crambidae
- Genus: Megastes
- Species: M. rosinalis

Binomial name
- Megastes rosinalis (Guenée, 1854)

Synonyms
- Botys rosinalis Guenée, 1854

Species of moth

Megastes rosinalis is a moth in the family Crambidae. It was described by Achille Guenée in 1854. It is found in Brazil.
