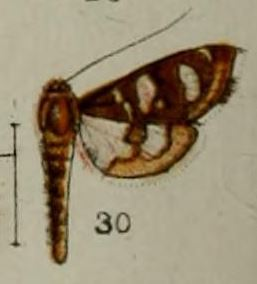
- Glyphodella flavibrunnea

Scientific classification
- Kingdom: Animalia
- Phylum: Arthropoda
- Clade: Pancrustacea
- Class: Insecta
- Order: Lepidoptera
- Family: Crambidae
- Subfamily: Spilomelinae
- Tribe: Margaroniini
- Genus: Glyphodella; J. C. Shaffer & Munroe, 2007

Type species
- Glyphodella savyalis (Legrand, 1966)

= Glyphodella =

Genus of moths

Glyphodella is a genus of moths of the family Crambidae from Africa.

== Species ==
- Glyphodella flavibrunnea (Hampson, 1899) (from Congo, Madagascar, South Africa)
- Glyphodella fojaensis (Sutrisno & Ubaidillah, 2026) (from Papua, Indonesia)
- Glyphodella savyalis (Legrand, 1966) (from Aldabra)
- Glyphodella vadonalis (Viette, 1958) (from Madagascar)
