= Liopasia ochracealis =

Scientific classification
- Kingdom: Animalia
- Phylum: Arthropoda
- Class: Insecta
- Order: Lepidoptera
- Family: Crambidae
- Genus: Liopasia
- Species: L. ochracealis

Binomial name
- Liopasia ochracealis (Walker, 1866)

Synonyms
- Terastia ochracealis Walker, 1866; Botys rhodophilalis Maassen, 1890

Species of moth

Liopasia ochracealis is a moth in the family Crambidae. It was described by Francis Walker in 1866. It is found in Ecuador and Brazil.
