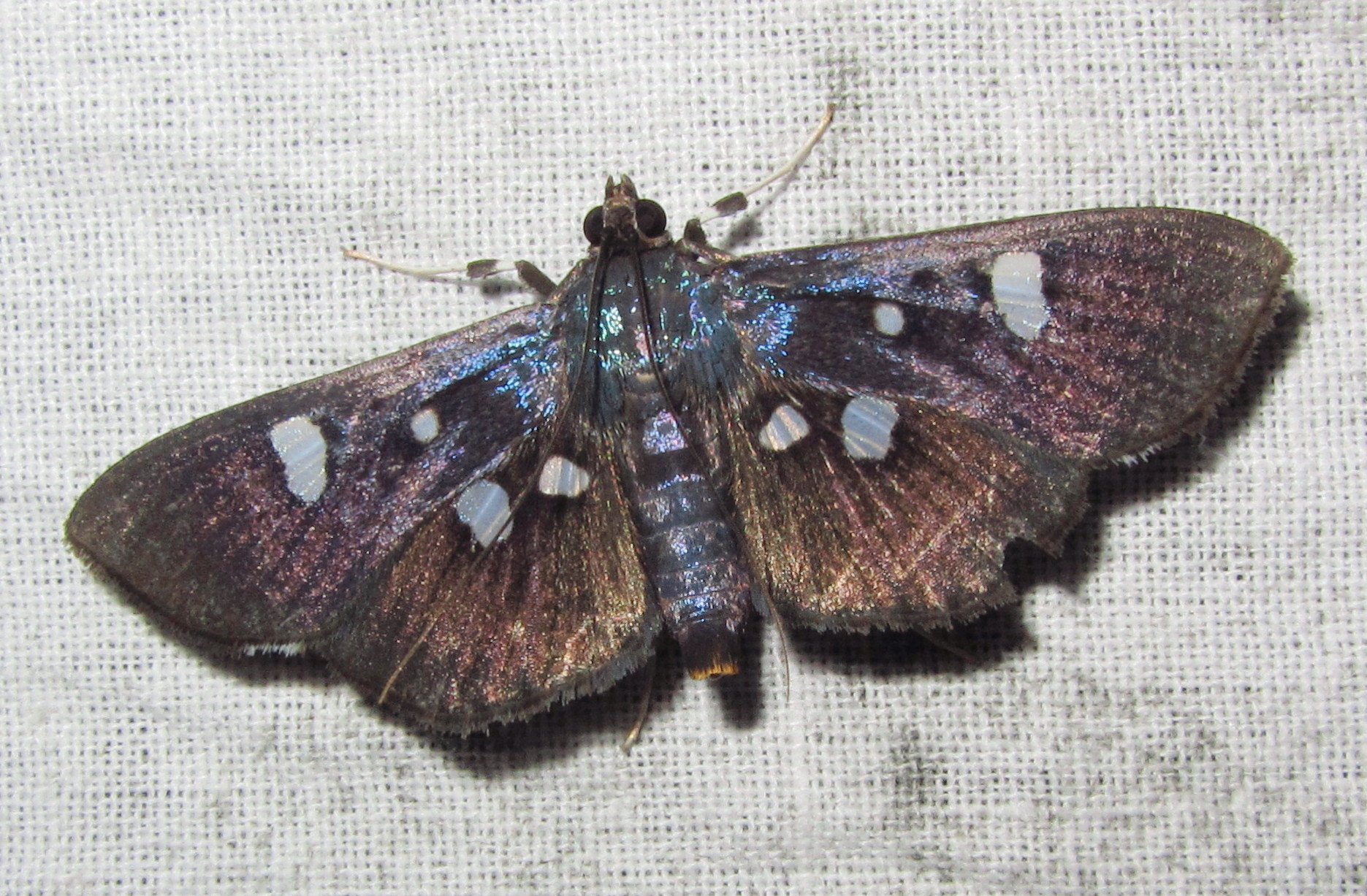
- Rhagoba octomaculalis

Scientific classification
- Kingdom: Animalia
- Phylum: Arthropoda
- Class: Insecta
- Order: Lepidoptera
- Family: Crambidae
- Tribe: Margaroniini
- Genus: Rhagoba; Moore, 1888

= Rhagoba =

Genus of moths

Rhagoba is an oriental genus of moths of the family Crambidae described by Frederic Moore in 1888. Species of the genus resemble those of Pygospila, but can be told apart by genital differences in both sexes and by a stronger metallic blue reflection on the thorax. Species are known only from Asia, where they have been recorded from China, Vietnam, Laos, India, Nepal and Bhutan.

== Species ==
Ko, Bayarsaikhan, Lee and Bae list three species in their 2024 review of the genus:

- Rhagoba flavolineata Ko & Bae, 2024 - Laos
- Rhagoba obvellata Du & Li, 2012 - China, Laos
- Rhagoba octomaculalis (Moore, 1867) - Laos, Vietnam, Nepal, Bhutan, India, China - type species (as Filodes octomaculalis)
