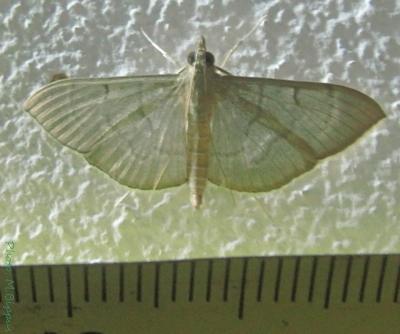

Scientific classification
- Kingdom: Animalia
- Phylum: Arthropoda
- Class: Insecta
- Order: Lepidoptera
- Family: Crambidae
- Tribe: Margaroniini
- Genus: Poliobotys; J. C. Shaffer & Munroe, 2007
- Species: P. ablactalis

Binomial name
- Poliobotys ablactalis (Walker, 1859)

Synonyms
- Lamprophaia borbonica (Guillermet, 2008); Lamprophaia murinalis (Pagenstecher, 1885); Botys ablactalis Walker, 1859; Lamprophaia ablactalis (Walker, 1859)

= Poliobotys =

Genus of moths

Poliobotys is a monotypic moth genus of the family Crambidae described by Jay C. Shaffer and Eugene G. Munroe in 2007. Its single species, Poliobotys ablactalis, was described by Francis Walker in 1859. It occurs throughout South-east Asia, including Réunion, Australia, Hong Kong and Africa (Kenya, Senegal, South Africa).

== Subspecies ==
- Poliobotys ablactalis ablactalis
- Poliobotys ablactalis borbonica (Guillermet, 2008) (Réunion)
