= Aphytoceros subflavalis =

Scientific classification
- Kingdom: Animalia
- Phylum: Arthropoda
- Class: Insecta
- Order: Lepidoptera
- Family: Crambidae
- Genus: Aphytoceros
- Species: A. subflavalis

Binomial name
- Aphytoceros subflavalis C. Swinhoe, 1917

Species of moth

Aphytoceros subflavalis is a moth in the family Crambidae. It was described by Charles Swinhoe in 1917. It is found on New Guinea.

The wings are uniform pale yellow with pale chocolate-brown markings.
