= Compacta hirtaloidalis =

Scientific classification
- Kingdom: Animalia
- Phylum: Arthropoda
- Class: Insecta
- Order: Lepidoptera
- Family: Crambidae
- Genus: Compacta
- Species: C. hirtaloidalis

Binomial name
- Compacta hirtaloidalis (Dyar, 1912)

Synonyms
- Polygrammodes hirtaloidalis Dyar, 1912; Compacta hirtaloides

Species of moth

Compacta hirtaloidalis is a species of moth in the family Crambidae. It was described by Harrison Gray Dyar Jr. in 1912. It is found in Mexico and the southern United States, where it has been recorded from Arizona.
