= Syngamilyta pehlkei =

Scientific classification
- Kingdom: Animalia
- Phylum: Arthropoda
- Class: Insecta
- Order: Lepidoptera
- Family: Crambidae
- Genus: Syngamilyta
- Species: S. pehlkei

Binomial name
- Syngamilyta pehlkei (E. Hering, 1906)

Synonyms
- Desmia pehlkei E. Hering, 1906; Syngamilyta leucinodalis Strand, 1920

Species of moth

Syngamilyta pehlkei is a moth in the family Crambidae. It was described by E. Hering in 1906. It is found in Ecuador and Trinidad.
