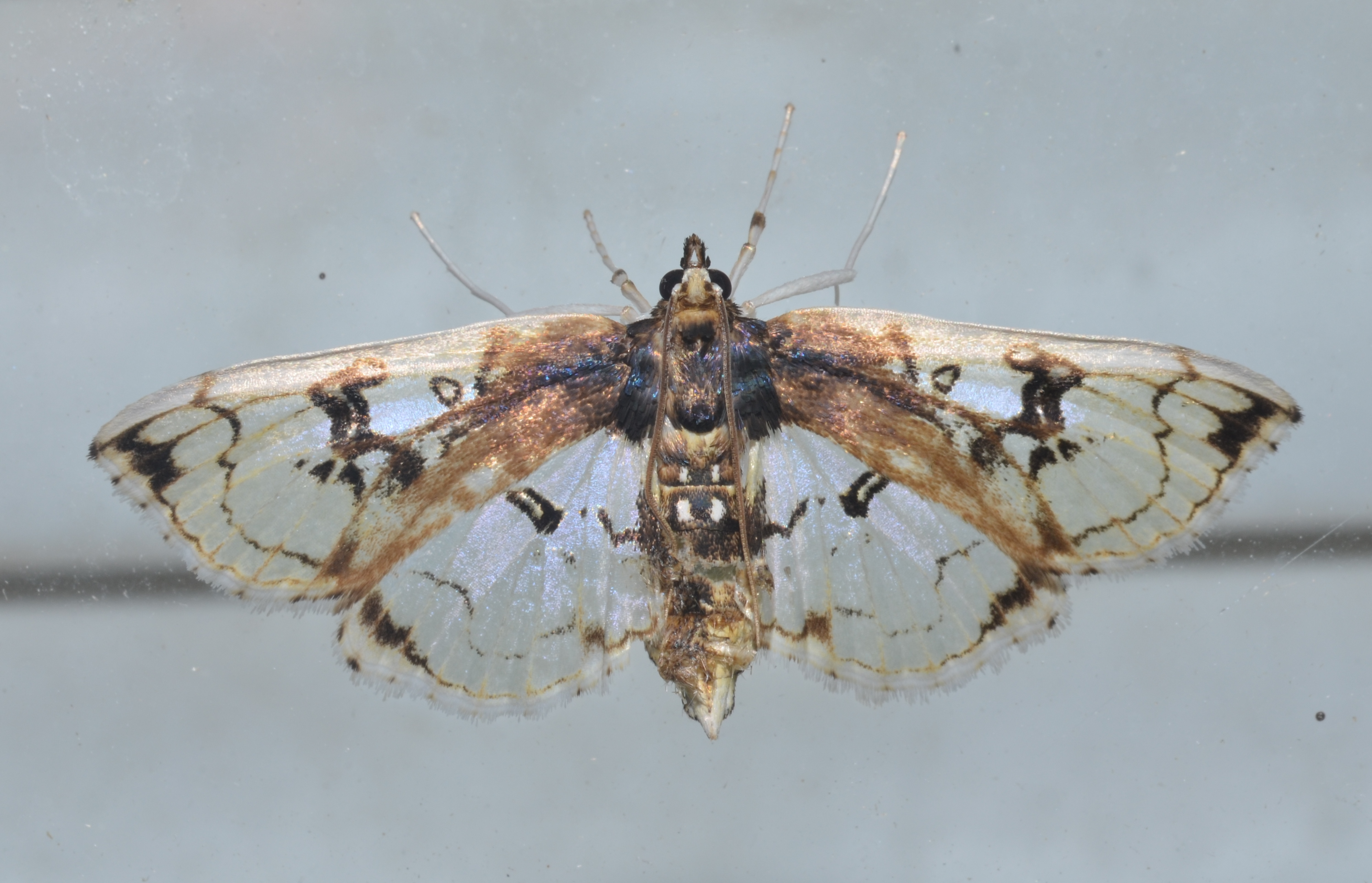

Scientific classification
- Kingdom: Animalia
- Phylum: Arthropoda
- Class: Insecta
- Order: Lepidoptera
- Family: Crambidae
- Genus: Compacta
- Species: C. capitalis

Binomial name
- Compacta capitalis (Grote, 1881)

Synonyms
- Botis capitalis Grote, 1881; Polygrammodes posticata Forbes, 1923

= Compacta capitalis =

Species of moth

Compacta capitalis is a moth in the family Crambidae. It was described by Augustus Radcliffe Grote in 1881. It is found in North America, where it has been recorded from Maryland to Florida, west to Texas and possibly Colorado, north to Illinois.

There is a dark apical blotch on both wings. Adults are on wing from May to August.
