= Syngamilyta apicolor =

Scientific classification
- Kingdom: Animalia
- Phylum: Arthropoda
- Class: Insecta
- Order: Lepidoptera
- Family: Crambidae
- Genus: Syngamilyta
- Species: S. apicolor

Binomial name
- Syngamilyta apicolor (H. Druce, 1902)

Synonyms
- Syngamia apicolor H. Druce, 1902

Species of moth

Syngamilyta apicolor is a moth in the family Crambidae. It was described by Herbert Druce in 1902. It is found in Colombia, Costa Rica and Honduras.
