= Liopasia apicenotata =

Scientific classification
- Kingdom: Animalia
- Phylum: Arthropoda
- Class: Insecta
- Order: Lepidoptera
- Family: Crambidae
- Genus: Liopasia
- Species: L. apicenotata

Binomial name
- Liopasia apicenotata Hampson, 1918

Species of moth

Liopasia apicenotata is a moth in the family Crambidae. It was described by George Hampson in 1918. It is found in Trinidad.
