= Eusabena paraphragma =

Scientific classification
- Kingdom: Animalia
- Phylum: Arthropoda
- Class: Insecta
- Order: Lepidoptera
- Family: Crambidae
- Genus: Eusabena
- Species: E. paraphragma

Binomial name
- Eusabena paraphragma (Meyrick, 1889)

Synonyms
- Notarcha paraphragma Meyrick, 1889; Bocchoris xanthialis Hampson, 1897

Species of moth

Eusabena paraphragma is a moth in the family Crambidae. It was described by Edward Meyrick in 1889. It is found on New Guinea and Australia, where it has been recorded from Queensland.

Adults are yellow with branched dark brown sinuous lines on the wings.
