= Meroctena zygialis =

Scientific classification
- Kingdom: Animalia
- Phylum: Arthropoda
- Class: Insecta
- Order: Lepidoptera
- Family: Crambidae
- Genus: Meroctena
- Species: M. zygialis

Binomial name
- Meroctena zygialis H. Druce, 1899

Species of moth

Meroctena zygialis is a moth in the family Crambidae. It was described by Herbert Druce in 1899. It is found in Xalapa, Mexico.

The forewings are pale citron yellow, but darker along the costal and outer margins, with two brown spots near the base and one at the end of the cell. There is a curved submarginal line of small brown dots extending from the costal to the inner margin, and a marginal row of minute dots extending from the apex to the anal angle. The hindwings are similar to the forewings, but with lines of small spots only.
