= Nolckenia =

Scientific classification
- Kingdom: Animalia
- Phylum: Arthropoda
- Class: Insecta
- Order: Lepidoptera
- Family: Crambidae
- Tribe: Margaroniini
- Genus: Nolckenia; Snellen, 1875
- Species: N. margaritalis

Binomial name
- Nolckenia margaritalis Snellen, 1875

Genus of moths

Nolckenia is a monotypic moth genus of the family Crambidae described by Pieter Cornelius Tobias Snellen in 1875. It contains only one species, Nolckenia margaritalis, described in the same paper, which is found in Colombia.
