= Compacta (moth) =

Scientific classification
- Kingdom: Animalia
- Phylum: Arthropoda
- Class: Insecta
- Order: Lepidoptera
- Family: Crambidae
- Tribe: Margaroniini
- Genus: Compacta; Amsel, 1956

Genus of moths

Compacta is a genus of moths of the family Crambidae. The genus was erected by Hans Georg Amsel in 1956.

== Species ==
- Compacta capitalis (Grote, 1881)
- Compacta hirtalis (Guenée, 1854)
- Compacta hirtaloidalis (Dyar, 1912)
- Compacta nigrolinealis (Warren, 1892)
