= Megastes rhexialis =

Scientific classification
- Kingdom: Animalia
- Phylum: Arthropoda
- Class: Insecta
- Order: Lepidoptera
- Family: Crambidae
- Genus: Megastes
- Species: M. rhexialis

Binomial name
- Megastes rhexialis (Walker, 1859)

Synonyms
- Botys rhexialis Walker, 1859

Species of moth

Megastes rhexialis is a moth in the family Crambidae. It was described by Francis Walker in 1859. It is found in Venezuela.
