= Megastes pusialis =

Scientific classification
- Kingdom: Animalia
- Phylum: Arthropoda
- Class: Insecta
- Order: Lepidoptera
- Family: Crambidae
- Genus: Megastes
- Species: M. pusialis

Binomial name
- Megastes pusialis Snellen, 1875

Species of moth

Megastes pusialis is a moth in the family Crambidae. It was described by Snellen in 1875. It is found in Colombia.
