= Liopasia andrealis =

Scientific classification
- Kingdom: Animalia
- Phylum: Arthropoda
- Class: Insecta
- Order: Lepidoptera
- Family: Crambidae
- Genus: Liopasia
- Species: L. andrealis

Binomial name
- Liopasia andrealis Dognin, 1910

Synonyms
- Liopasia athlophora Meyrick, 1936

Species of moth

Liopasia andrealis is a moth in the family Crambidae. It was described by Paul Dognin in 1910. It is found in Venezuela and Brazil (Mato Grosso).
