= Megastes zarbinalis =

Scientific classification
- Kingdom: Animalia
- Phylum: Arthropoda
- Class: Insecta
- Order: Lepidoptera
- Family: Crambidae
- Genus: Megastes
- Species: M. zarbinalis

Binomial name
- Megastes zarbinalis Schaus, 1934

Synonyms
- Megastes garbinalis Klima, 1939

Species of moth

Megastes zarbinalis is a moth in the family Crambidae. It was described by Schaus in 1934. It is found in Brazil (Rio de Janeiro).
