= Meroctena =

Scientific classification
- Kingdom: Animalia
- Phylum: Arthropoda
- Clade: Pancrustacea
- Class: Insecta
- Order: Lepidoptera
- Family: Crambidae
- Tribe: Margaroniini
- Genus: Meroctena; Lederer, 1863

Genus of moths

Meroctena is a genus of moths of the family Crambidae. The genus was first described by Julius Lederer in 1863.

== Species ==
- Meroctena dichocrosialis Hampson, 1899
- Meroctena staintonii Lederer, 1863
- Meroctena tullalis (Walker, 1859)
- Meroctena zygialis Druce, 1899
