= Chrysothyridia triangulifera =

Scientific classification
- Kingdom: Animalia
- Phylum: Arthropoda
- Class: Insecta
- Order: Lepidoptera
- Family: Crambidae
- Genus: Chrysothyridia
- Species: C. triangulifera

Binomial name
- Chrysothyridia triangulifera Munroe, 1967

Species of moth

Chrysothyridia triangulifera is a moth in the family Crambidae. It was described by Eugene G. Munroe in 1967. It is found on Luzon in the Philippines.
