= Liopasia purpurealis =

Scientific classification
- Kingdom: Animalia
- Phylum: Arthropoda
- Class: Insecta
- Order: Lepidoptera
- Family: Crambidae
- Genus: Liopasia
- Species: L. purpurealis

Binomial name
- Liopasia purpurealis Schaus, 1924

Species of moth

Liopasia purpurealis is a moth in the family Crambidae. It was described by Schaus in 1924. It is found in Peru.
