= Colomychus =

Scientific classification
- Kingdom: Animalia
- Phylum: Arthropoda
- Class: Insecta
- Order: Lepidoptera
- Family: Crambidae
- Tribe: Margaroniini
- Genus: Colomychus; Munroe, 1956

Genus of moths

Colomychus is a genus of moths of the family Crambidae. It is found in the Southeastern United States.

== Species ==
- Colomychus florepicta (Dyar, 1914)
- Colomychus talis (Grote, 1878)
