= Liopasia teneralis =

Scientific classification
- Kingdom: Animalia
- Phylum: Arthropoda
- Class: Insecta
- Order: Lepidoptera
- Family: Crambidae
- Genus: Liopasia
- Species: L. teneralis

Binomial name
- Liopasia teneralis (Lederer, 1863)

Synonyms
- Botys teneralis Lederer, 1863

Species of moth

Liopasia teneralis is a moth in the family Crambidae. It was described by Julius Lederer in 1863. It is found in Colombia.
