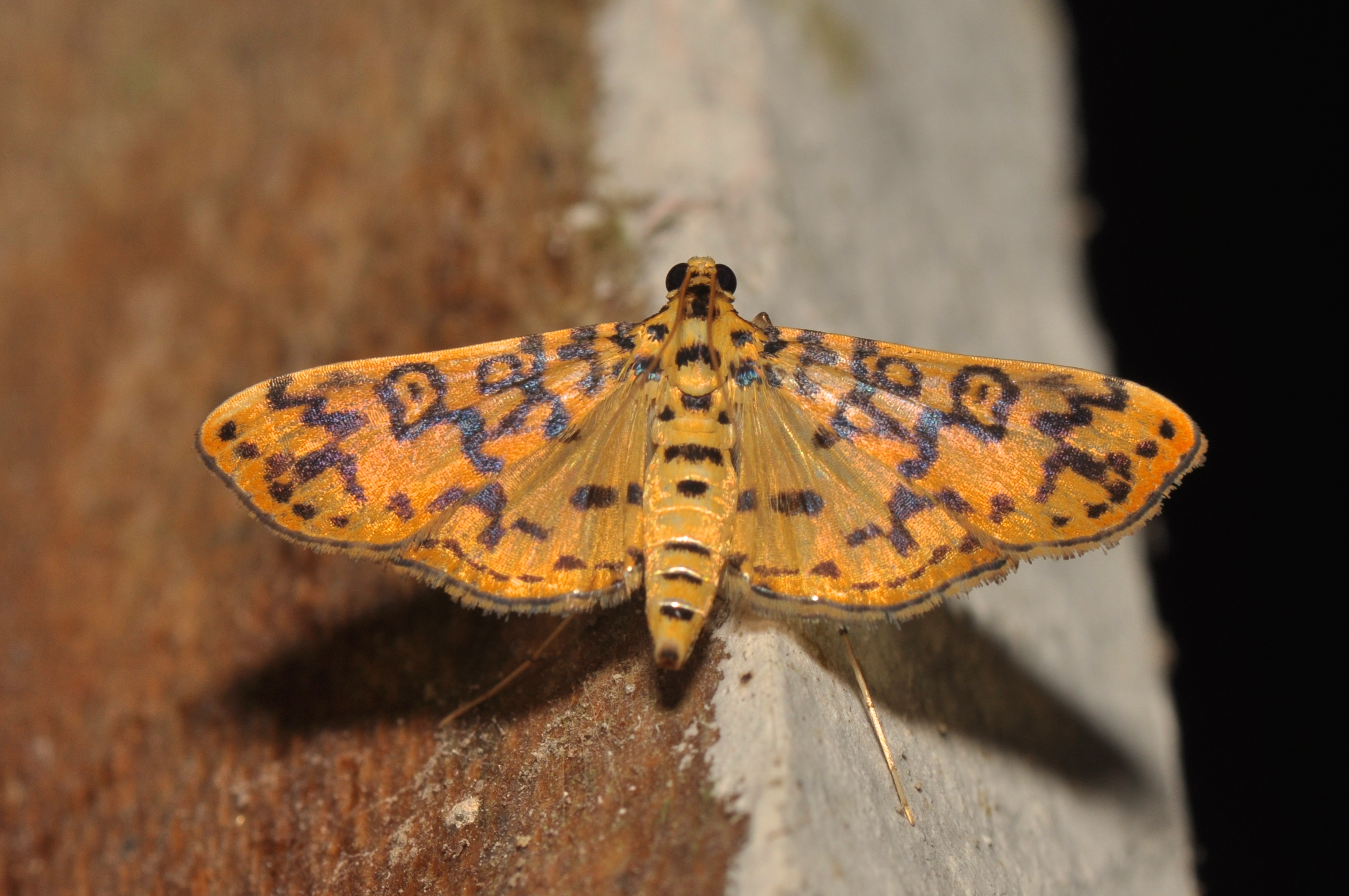
- Found in Coaster Rica

Scientific classification
- Kingdom: Animalia
- Phylum: Arthropoda
- Clade: Pancrustacea
- Class: Insecta
- Order: Lepidoptera
- Family: Crambidae
- Tribe: Margaroniini
- Genus: Asturodes; Amsel, 1956

= Asturodes =

Genus of moths

Asturodes is a genus of snout moths in the subfamily Spilomelinae of the family Crambidae. The genus is placed in the tribe Margaroniini.

It contains four species in the subtropical and tropical Americas.

The caterpillars of Asturodes feed on leaves of Rhamnaceae species, with A. fimbriauralis recorded from Colubrina arborescens.

== Species ==
- Asturodes bioalfae Solis in Solis, Phillips-Rodríguez, Hallwachs, Dapkey & Janzen, 2020, found in Costa Rica
- Asturodes encisoensis Solis in Solis, Phillips-Rodríguez, Hallwachs, Dapkey & Janzen, 2020, found in Costa Rica
- Asturodes fimbriauralis (Guenée, 1854), type species, reportedly found in Belize, Brazil, Costa Rica, Dominican Republic, Ecuador, Mexico, Panama, Puerto Rico, Suriname, Trinidad and Tobago, United States (Florida), and Peru. (but these sources predate the description of the other three species)
- Asturodes junkoshimurae Solis in Solis, Phillips-Rodríguez, Hallwachs, Dapkey & Janzen, 2020, found in Costa Rica
