= Uncobotyodes =

Scientific classification
- Domain: Eukaryota
- Kingdom: Animalia
- Phylum: Arthropoda
- Class: Insecta
- Order: Lepidoptera
- Family: Crambidae
- Tribe: Margaroniini
- Genus: Uncobotyodes; Kirti & Rose, 1990
- Species: U. patulalis

Binomial name
- Uncobotyodes patulalis (Walker, 1866)

Synonyms
- Botys patulalis Walker, 1866

Genus of moths

Uncobotyodes is a genus of moths of the family Crambidae. It contains only one species, Uncobotyodes patulalis, is found in India (Darjeeling).
