= Didymostoma euphranoralis =

Scientific classification
- Kingdom: Animalia
- Phylum: Arthropoda
- Class: Insecta
- Order: Lepidoptera
- Family: Crambidae
- Genus: Didymostoma
- Species: D. euphranoralis

Binomial name
- Didymostoma euphranoralis (Walker, 1859)

Synonyms
- Botys euphranoralis Walker, 1859

Species of moth

Didymostoma euphranoralis is a moth in the family Crambidae. It was described by Francis Walker in 1859. It is found in Indonesia, where it has been recorded from Sulawesi.
