= Megastes grandalis =

Scientific classification
- Kingdom: Animalia
- Phylum: Arthropoda
- Class: Insecta
- Order: Lepidoptera
- Family: Crambidae
- Genus: Megastes
- Species: M. grandalis

Binomial name
- Megastes grandalis Guenée, 1854

Species of moth

Megastes grandalis is a moth in the family Crambidae. It was described by Achille Guenée in 1854. It is found in Brazil.
