= Liopasia leucoperalis =

Scientific classification
- Kingdom: Animalia
- Phylum: Arthropoda
- Class: Insecta
- Order: Lepidoptera
- Family: Crambidae
- Genus: Liopasia
- Species: L. leucoperalis

Binomial name
- Liopasia leucoperalis Hampson, 1918

Species of moth

Liopasia leucoperalis is a moth in the family Crambidae. It was described by George Hampson in 1918. It is found in Peru.
