= Radessa vittilimbalis =

Scientific classification
- Domain: Eukaryota
- Kingdom: Animalia
- Phylum: Arthropoda
- Class: Insecta
- Order: Lepidoptera
- Family: Crambidae
- Genus: Radessa
- Species: R. vittilimbalis

Binomial name
- Radessa vittilimbalis Munroe, 1977

Species of moth

Radessa vittilimbalis is a moth in the family Crambidae. It was described by Eugene G. Munroe in 1977. It is found in Colombia.
