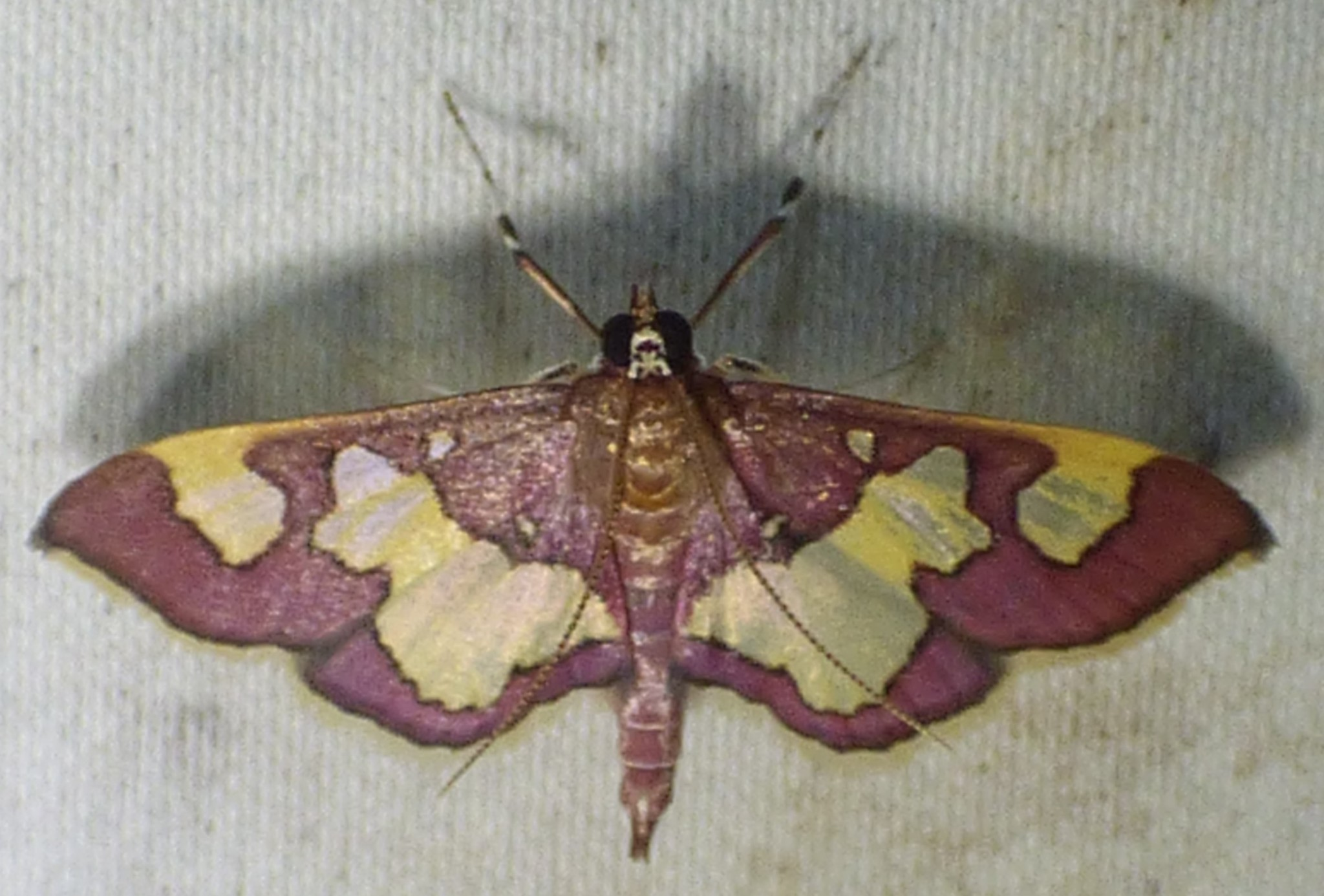

Scientific classification
- Kingdom: Animalia
- Phylum: Arthropoda
- Class: Insecta
- Order: Lepidoptera
- Family: Crambidae
- Genus: Colomychus
- Species: C. talis

Binomial name
- Colomychus talis (Grote, 1878)

Synonyms
- Botis talis Grote, 1878

= Colomychus talis =

Distinguished colymychus moth

Species of moth

Colomychus talis, the distinguished colymychus moth, is a moth in the family Crambidae. It was described by Augustus Radcliffe Grote in 1878. It is found in Mexico and the south-eastern United States, where it has been recorded from Alabama, Arkansas, Florida, Georgia, Maryland, North Carolina, Oklahoma, South Carolina and Virginia.

Adults are on wing from May to August.
