= Didymostoma aurotinctalis =

Scientific classification
- Kingdom: Animalia
- Phylum: Arthropoda
- Class: Insecta
- Order: Lepidoptera
- Family: Crambidae
- Genus: Didymostoma
- Species: D. aurotinctalis

Binomial name
- Didymostoma aurotinctalis (Hampson, 1898)

Synonyms
- Bocchoris aurotinctalis Hampson, 1898

Species of moth

Didymostoma aurotinctalis is a moth in the family Crambidae. It was described by George Hampson in 1898. It is found in Australia, where it has been recorded from Queensland. It is also found in New Guinea, where it is found on Fergusson Island.

The wings are transparent with black patches, including one at the tip of the forewings.
