= Megastes meridionalis =

Scientific classification
- Kingdom: Animalia
- Phylum: Arthropoda
- Class: Insecta
- Order: Lepidoptera
- Family: Crambidae
- Genus: Megastes
- Species: M. meridionalis

Binomial name
- Megastes meridionalis Hampson, 1913

Species of moth

Megastes meridionalis is a moth in the family Crambidae. It was described by George Hampson in 1913. It is found in Argentina.
