= Chrysothyridia =

Scientific classification
- Kingdom: Animalia
- Phylum: Arthropoda
- Class: Insecta
- Order: Lepidoptera
- Family: Crambidae
- Tribe: Margaroniini
- Genus: Chrysothyridia; Munroe, 1967

Genus of moths

Chrysothyridia is a genus of moths of the family Crambidae.

== Species ==
- Chrysothyridia invertalis (Snellen, 1877)
- Chrysothyridia triangulifera Munroe, 1967
