= Megastes erythrostolalis =

Scientific classification
- Kingdom: Animalia
- Phylum: Arthropoda
- Class: Insecta
- Order: Lepidoptera
- Family: Crambidae
- Genus: Megastes
- Species: M. erythrostolalis

Binomial name
- Megastes erythrostolalis Hampson, 1918

Species of moth

Megastes erythrostolalis is a moth in the family Crambidae. It was described by George Hampson in 1918. It is found in Venezuela.
