= Megastes =

Scientific classification
- Kingdom: Animalia
- Phylum: Arthropoda
- Class: Insecta
- Order: Lepidoptera
- Family: Crambidae
- Subfamily: Spilomelinae
- Tribe: Margaroniini
- Genus: Megastes; Guenée, 1854

Genus of moths

Megastes is a genus of moths of the family Crambidae.

== Species ==
- Megastes australis Munroe, 1963
- Megastes brunnealis Hampson, 1913
- Megastes brunnettalis (Dyar, 1912)
- Megastes erythrostolalis Hampson, 1918
- Megastes grandalis Guenée, 1854
- Megastes major Munroe, 1959
- Megastes meridionalis Hampson, 1913
- Megastes olivalis Schaus, 1924
- Megastes praxiteles Druce, 1895
- Megastes pusialis Snellen, 1875
- Megastes rhexialis (Walker, 1859)
- Megastes romula Dyar, 1916
- Megastes rosinalis (Guenée, 1854)
- Megastes septentrionis Hampson, 1913
- Megastes spilosoma (C. Felder, R. Felder & Rogenhofer, 1875)
- Megastes zarbinalis Schaus, 1934
