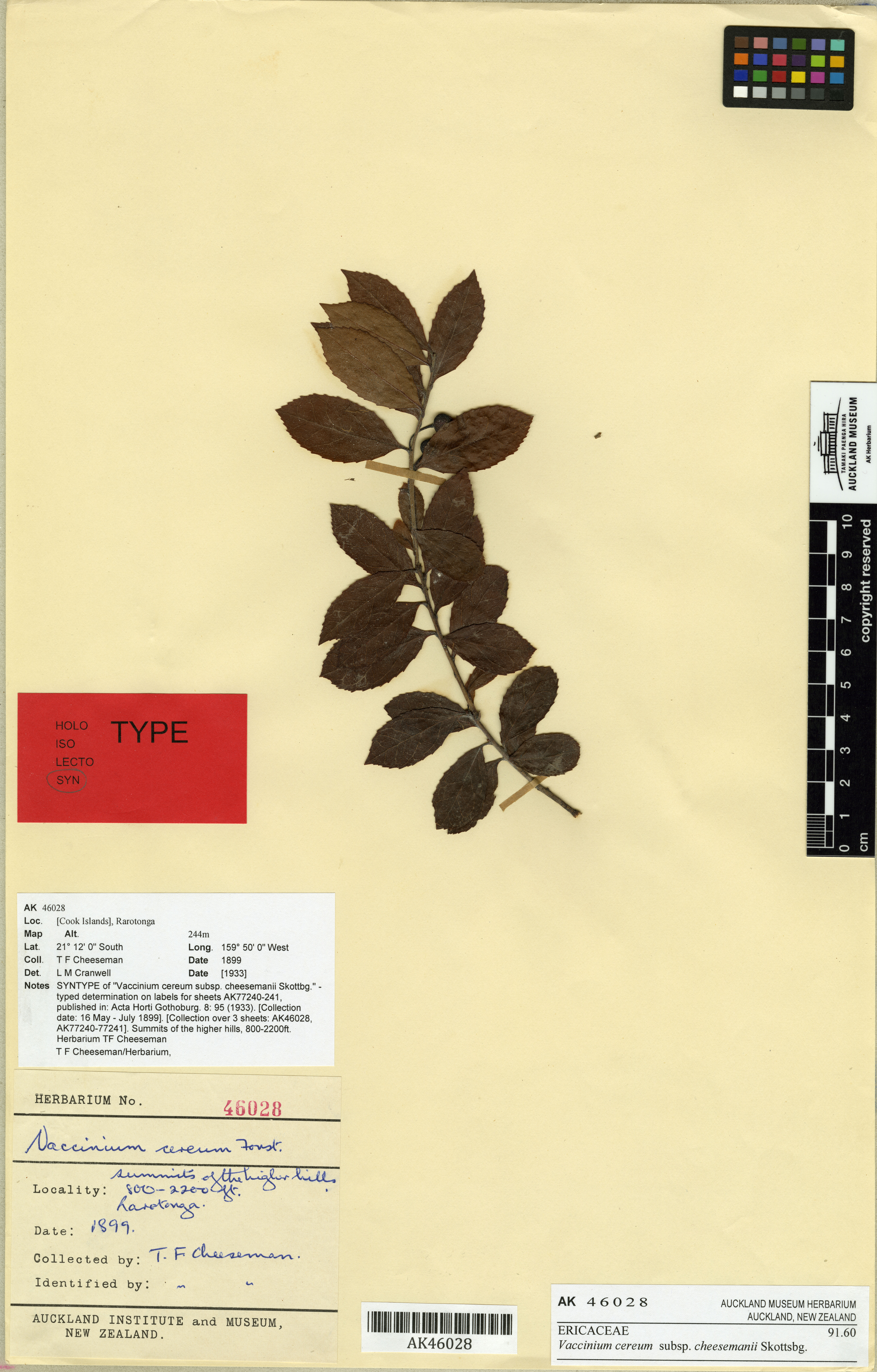
- Vaccinium cereum subsp. cheesemanii

Scientific classification
- Kingdom: Plantae
- Clade: Tracheophytes
- Clade: Angiosperms
- Clade: Eudicots
- Clade: Asterids
- Order: Ericales
- Family: Ericaceae
- Genus: Vaccinium
- Species: V. cereum

Binomial name
- Vaccinium cereum (L.f.) G.Forst. (1786)

Synonyms
- Andromeda cerea L.f. (1782); Metagonia cerea (L.f.) Nutt. (1842)

= Vaccinium cereum =

Species of flowering plant

Vaccinium cereum , East Polynesian Blueberry or Pacific Blueberry, a South Pacific species of flowering plant in the heath family, Ericaceae.

== Taxonomy ==
Three subdivisions are accepted:

- Vaccinium cereum subsp. cereum – Society Islands (Tahiti) and Marquesas Islands
- Vaccinium cereum subsp. cheesemanii Skottsb. – Cook Islands (Rarotonga)
- Vaccinium cereum var. raiateense (J.W.Moore) M.L.Grant – Society Islands (Raiatea)

Vaccinium cereum is the type species of Vaccinium section Macropelma, but its phylogenetic relationships to other Vaccinium species are not fully clear. It differs from the Hawaiian species of section Macropelma in having a pseudo-ten-locular ovary as well as a determinate floral axis with flowers in all of the leaf axils. It is similar overall to Vaccinium macgillivrayi from Vanuatu and New Caledonia, and may be more closely related to the Asiatic section Bracteata than to the Hawaiian species, and/or may be of hybrid origin.

== Distribution and habitat ==
The shrub is native to the Cook Islands, Marquesas Islands, and Society Islands in the South Pacific.

In the Marquesas Islands it inhabits dry and windswept mountaintops above 1,200 metres (3,900 feet), where it is a characteristic shrub in heathland growing up to 1 m (3 1/2 ft) tall, together Metrosideros collina, Leptecophylla tameiameiae, and Bidens spp., and interspersed with grasses and ferns. On Tahiti it grows on windswept razor-back ridges from 800 to 1,400 m (2,600 to 4,600 ft) elevation.
