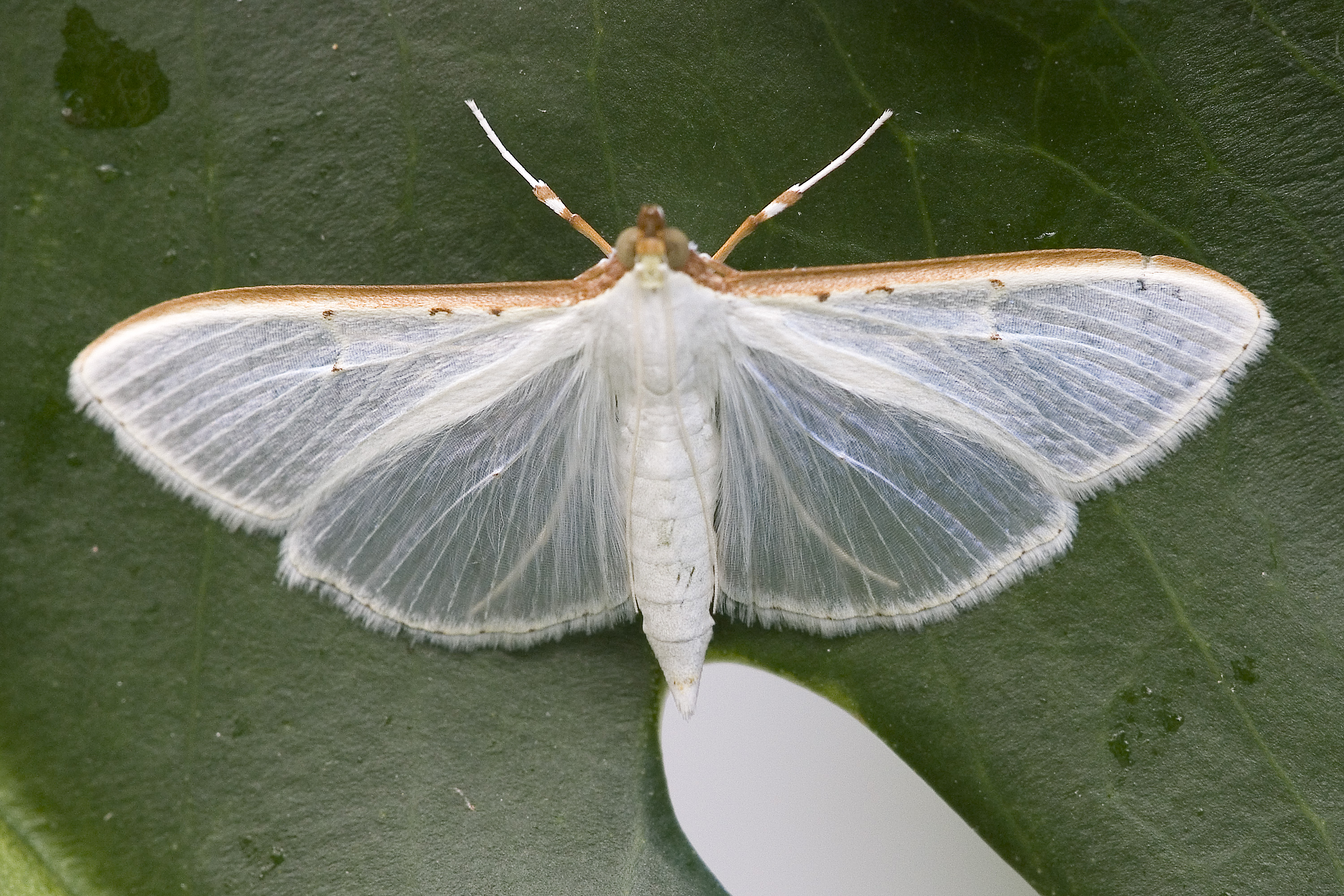
- Palpita vitrealis

Scientific classification
- Kingdom: Animalia
- Phylum: Arthropoda
- Clade: Pancrustacea
- Class: Insecta
- Order: Lepidoptera
- Family: Crambidae
- Subfamily: Spilomelinae
- Tribe: Margaroniini; C. Swinhoe & Cotes, 1889

Type genus
- Margaronia Hübner, 1825

= Margaroniini =

Tribe of moths

Margaroniini is a tribe of the species-rich subfamily Spilomelinae in the pyraloid moth family Crambidae. The tribe was erected by Charles Swinhoe and Everard Charles Cotes in 1889, originally as family Margaronidae.

The tribe comprises a number of economically impactful species whose caterpillars feed on agricultural crops. These species include the legume pod borer (Maruca vitrata), the jasmine moth (Palpita vitrealis) on olives, the cucumber moth (Diaphania indica), species of the genus Conogethes such as the yellow peach moth (C. punctiferalis), and the coconut leafroller (Omiodes blackburni). Furthermore, the box tree moth (Cydalima perspectalis) is included in this tribe.

== Genera ==
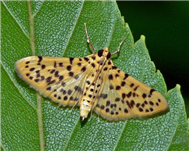
An unidentified Conogethes species

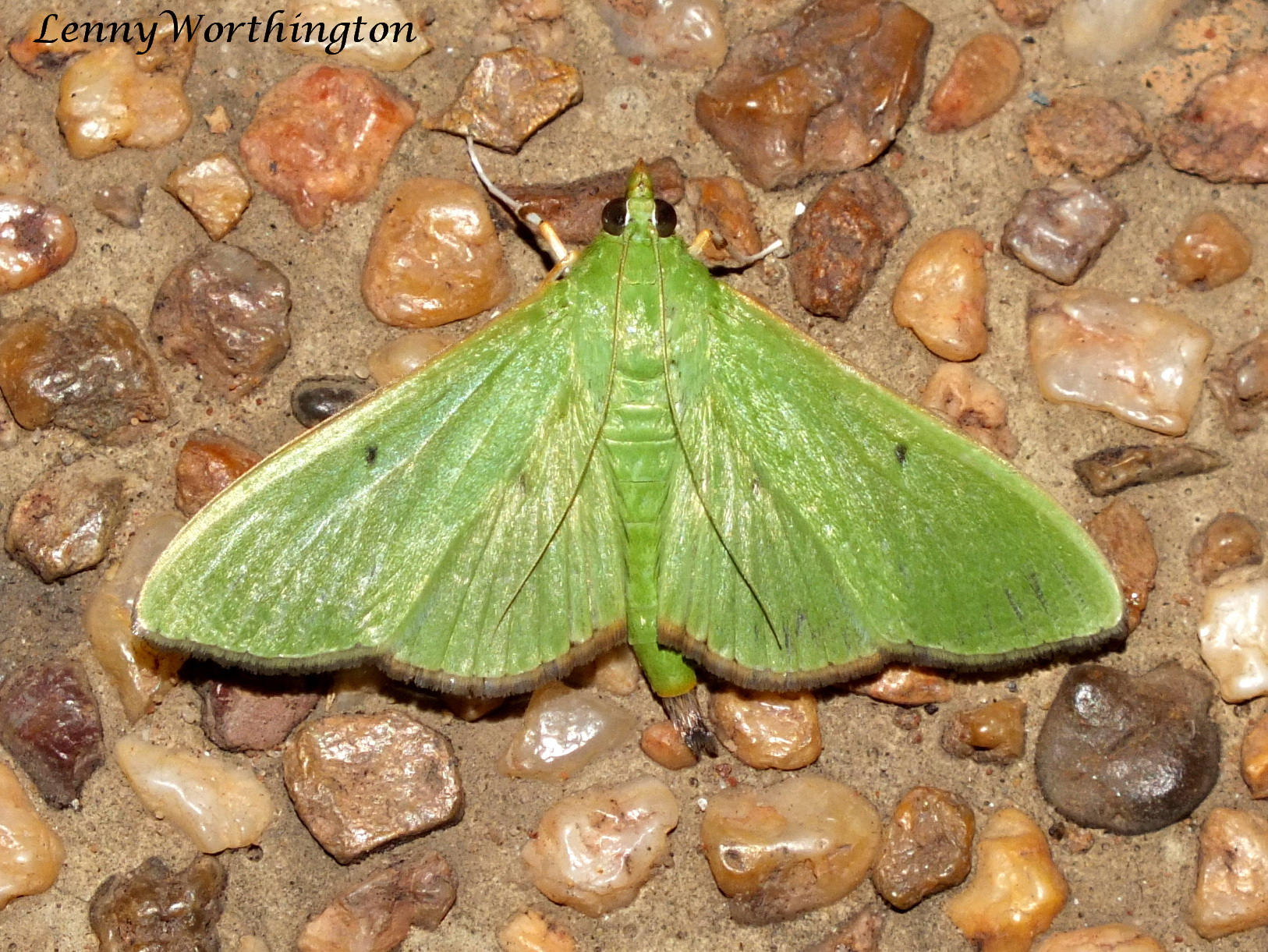
Parotis marginata

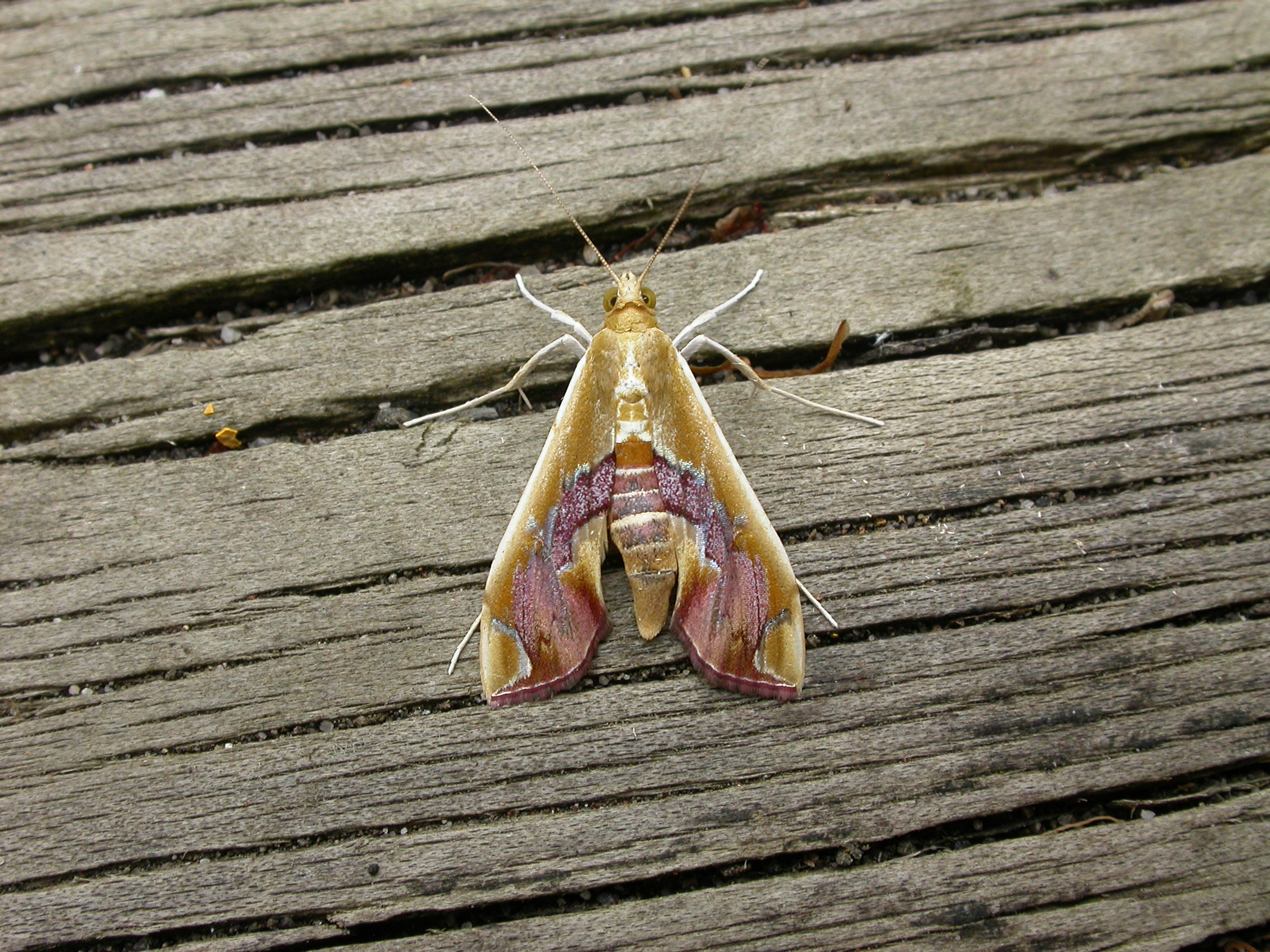
Agathodes ostentalis

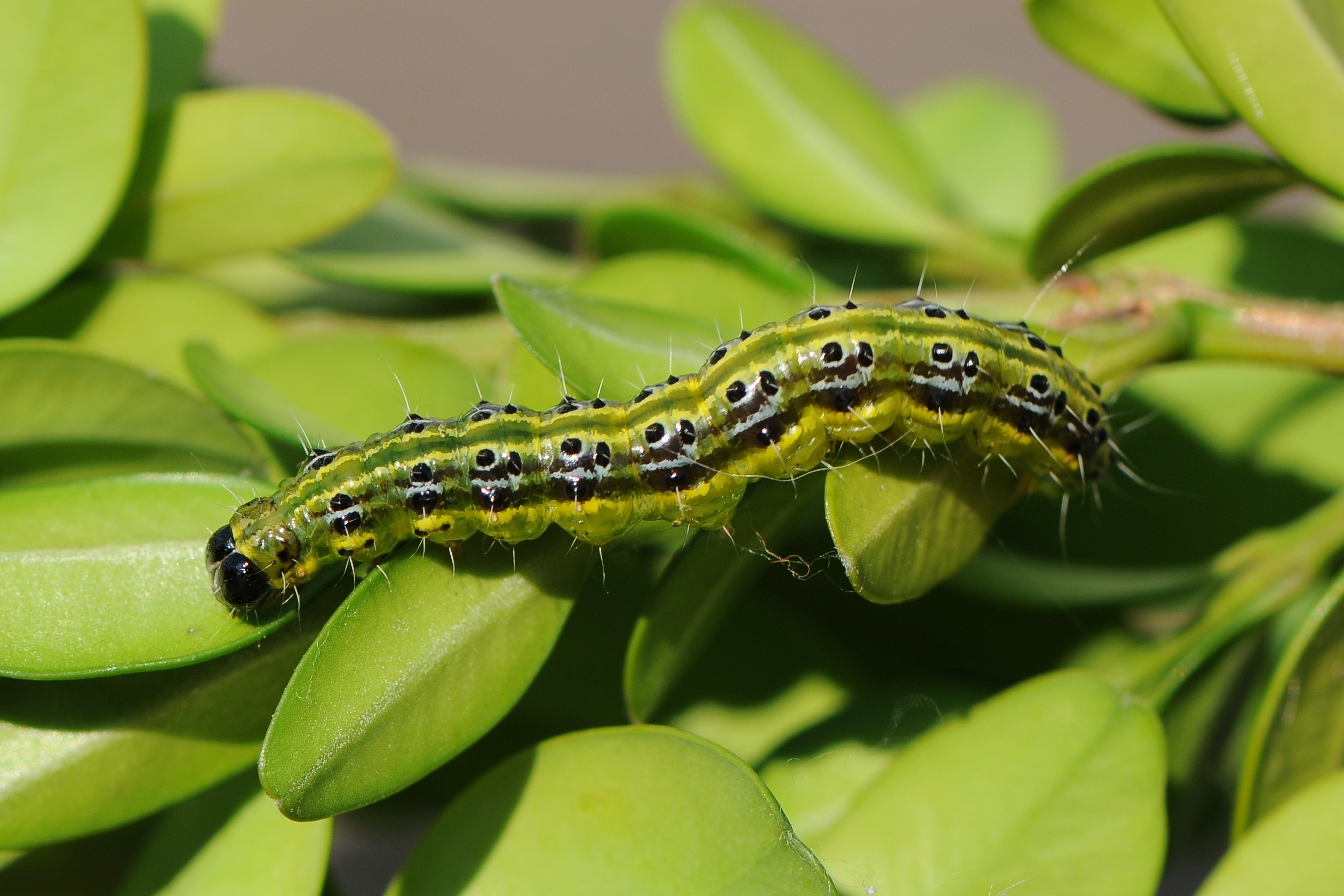
Caterpillar of Cydalima perspectalis

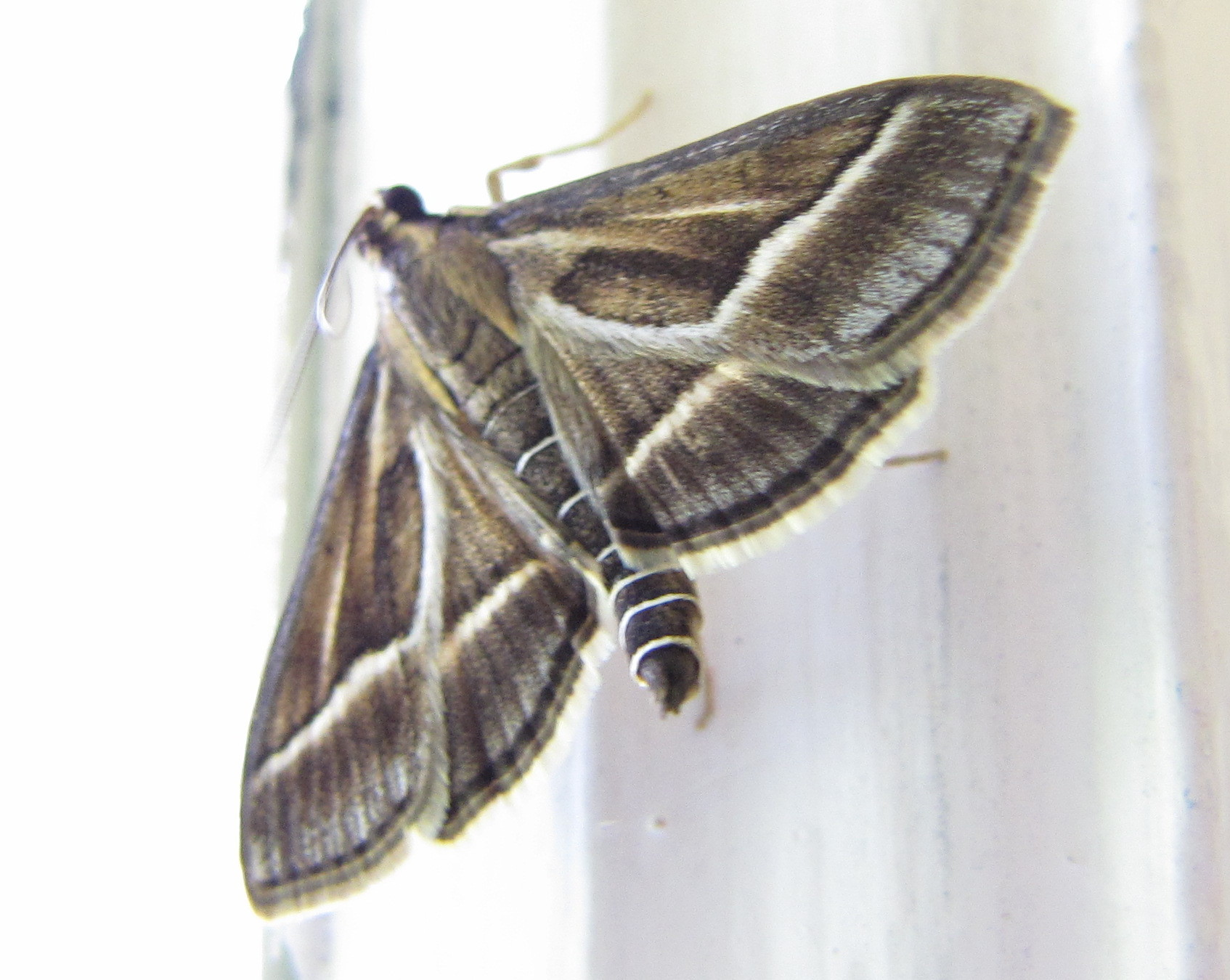
Omiodes continuatalis

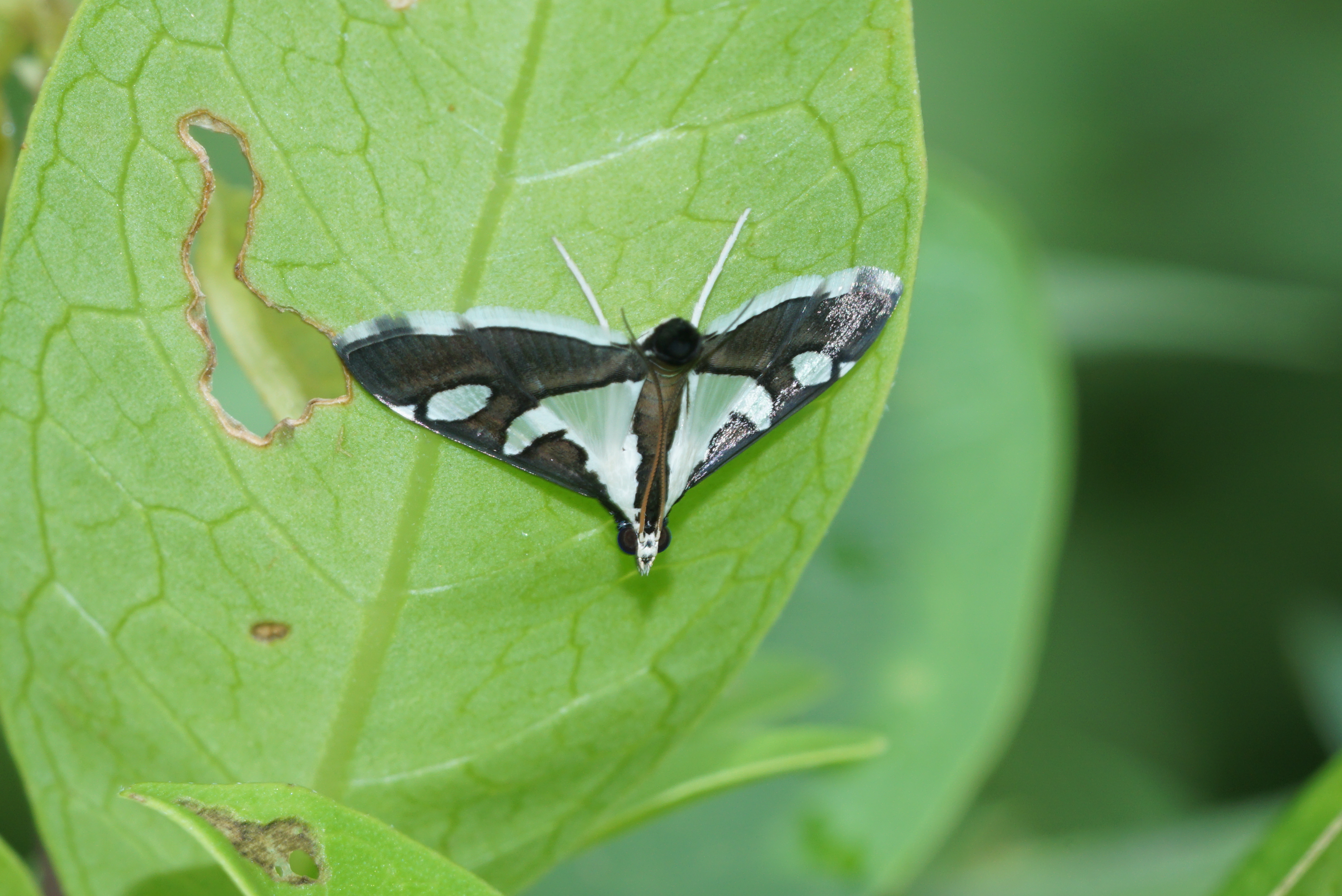
An unidentified Glyphodes species

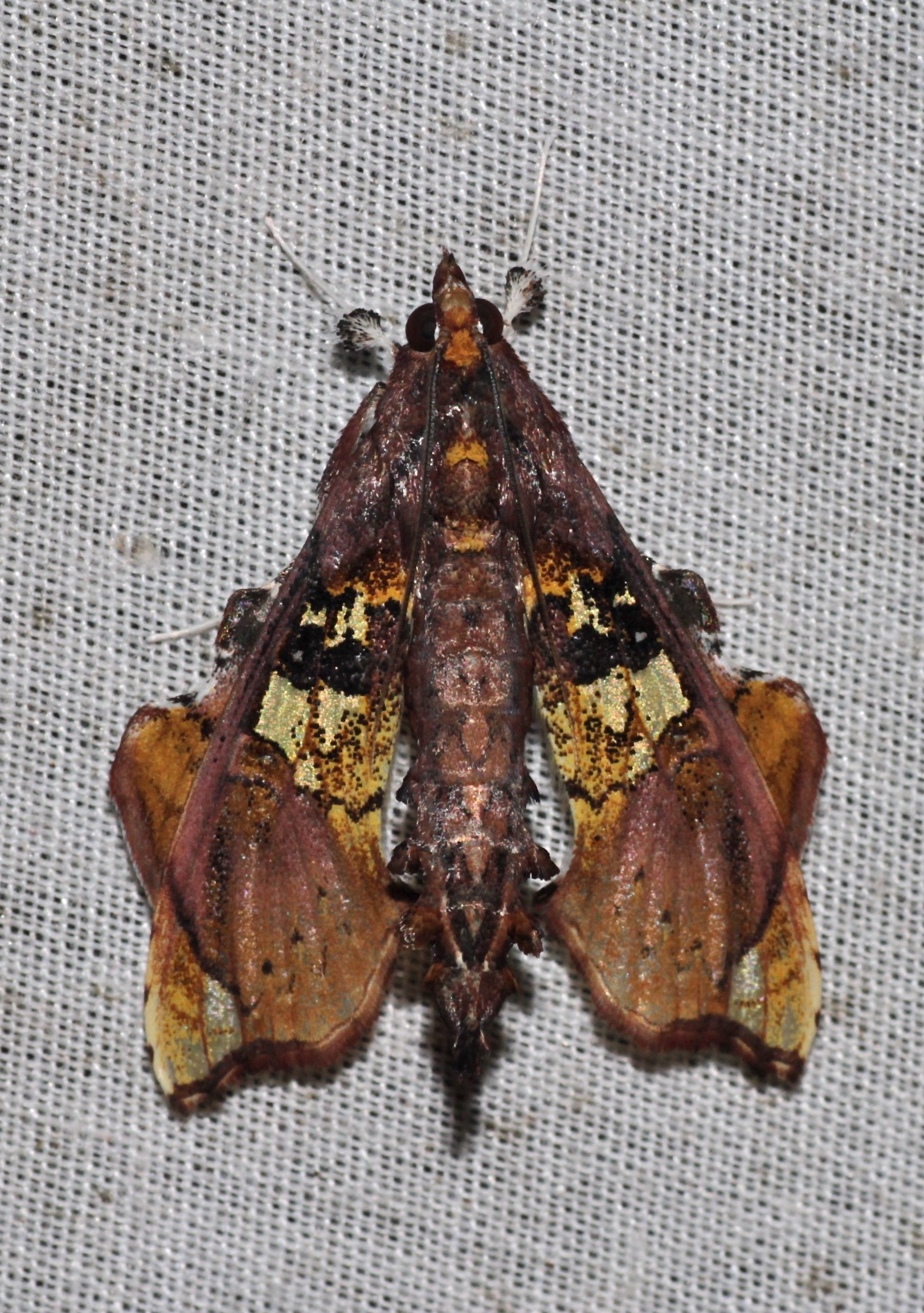
Terastia egialealis

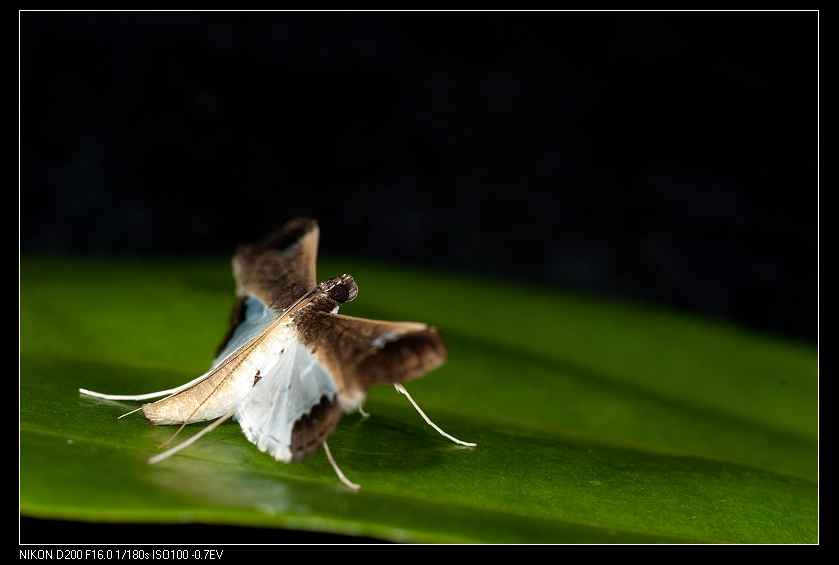
Maruca amboinalis

The tribe is by far the most species-rich among Spilomelinae. It currently comprises 1116 species in the following 74 genera:

- Agathodes Guenée, 1854 (= Stenurges Lederer, 1863)
- Agrioglypta Meyrick, 1932
- Alytana J. C. Shaffer & Munroe, 2007
- Analyta Lederer, 1863 (= Hyperanalyta Strand, 1918, misspelling Alyta Mabille, 1879)
- Anarmodia Lederer, 1863 (= Asparagmia Amsel, 1956, Atheropoda Lederer, 1863, misspelling Aetheropoda Amsel, 1956)
- Antigastra Lederer, 1863
- Aphytoceros Meyrick, 1884
- Arthroschista Hampson, 1893
- Asturodes Amsel, 1956
- Azochis Walker, 1859 (= Catacteniza Möschler, 1890, misspelling Arochis Walker, 1859)
- Botyodes Guenée, 1854
- Cadarena Moore, 1886 (= Idalia Hübner, 1825)
- Caldubotys Singh, Kirti & Singh in Singh, Kirti, Singh & Ranjan, 2019
- Caprinia Walker, 1859 (= misspelling Caprina Lederer, 1863)
- Chabulina J. C. Shaffer & Munroe, 2007
- Charitoprepes Warren, 1896
- Chrysophyllis Meyrick, 1934
- Chrysothyridia Munroe, 1967
- Cirrhochrista Lederer, 1863 (= Ancalidia de Joannis, 1932, Eucallaenia Snellen, 1892, Margaronia Marumo, 1917, Pachybotys Warren, 1895, misspelling Cirrochrista Warren, 1892)
- Colomychus Munroe, 1956
- Compacta Amsel, 1956
- Condylorrhiza Lederer, 1863
- Conogethes Meyrick, 1884 (= Dadessa Moore, 1886, misspelling Conygethes Snellen, 1890)
- Cydalima Lederer, 1863 (= Neoglyphodes Streltzov, 2008, Sisyrophora Lederer, 1863, Uliocome C. Swinhoe, 1900)
- Diaphania Hübner, 1818 (= Diaphania Stephens, 1829, Eudioptis Hübner, 1823, Phakellura Guilding, 1830, misspelling Phacellura J. L. R. Agassiz, 1847, Sestia Snellen, 1875)
- Didymostoma Warren, 1892
- Dysallacta Lederer, 1863 (= misspelling Disallacta Lederer, 1863)
- Endocrossis Meyrick, 1889
- Eusabena Snellen, 1901
- Filodes Guenée, 1854 (= Auxomitia Lederer, 1863)
- Ghesquierellana Berger, 1955 (= Phalanta Ghesquière, 1942, misspelling Ghesquieriellana Munroe, 1959)
- Glauconoe Warren, 1892
- Glyphodella J. C. Shaffer & Munroe, 2007
- Glyphodes Guenée, 1854 (= Caloptychia Hübner, 1825, misspelling Calliptychia J. L. R. Agassiz, 1847, Dysallacta Lederer, 1863, misspelling Disallacta Lederer, 1863, Morocosma Lederer, 1863)
- Hedyleptopsis Munroe, 1960
- Heterocnephes Lederer, 1863
- Hodebertia Leraut, 2003
- Hoterodes Guenée, 1854
- Leucochroma Guenée, 1854
- Liopasia Möschler, 1882 (= Dichotis Warren, 1892, Terastiodes Warren, 1892)
- Loxmaionia Schaus, 1913
- Maruca Walker, 1859 (= Siriocauta Lederer, 1863, misspelling Maruea Walker, 1859)
- Marwitzia Gaede, 1917
- Megaphysa Guenée, 1854
- Megastes Guenée, 1854
- Meroctena Lederer, 1863
- Nevrina Guenée, 1854 (= misspelling Neurina Moore, 1885)
- Nolckenia Snellen, 1875
- Obtusipalpis Hampson, 1896
- Omiodes Guenée, 1854 (= Charema Moore, 1888, Coenostola Lederer, 1863, misspelling Coenolesta Whalley, 1962, Deba Walker, 1866, Hedylepta Lederer, 1863, misspelling Hedilepta Lederer, 1863, misspelling Heydelepta Dyar, 1917, Lonchodes Guenée, 1854, Loxocreon Warren, 1892, Merotoma Meyrick, 1894, Pelecyntis Meyrick, 1884, Phycidicera Snellen, 1880, Spargeta Lederer, 1863)
- Omphisa Moore, 1886
- Pachynoa Lederer, 1863 (= Hypermeces Turner, 1933, Pitacanda Moore, 1886)
- Palpita Hübner, 1808 (= Apyrausta Amsel, 1951, Conchia Hübner, 1821, Hapalia Hübner, 1818, Hvidodes C. Swinhoe, 1900, Margarodes Guenée, 1854, Ledereria Marschall, 1875, Margaronia Hübner, 1825, Paradosis Zeller, 1852, Sarothronota Lederer, 1863, Sebunta Walker, 1863, Sylora C. Swinhoe, 1900, Tobata Walker, 1859)
- Parotis Hübner, 1831 (= Cenocnemis Warren, 1896, Chloauges Lederer, 1863, Enchocnemidia Lederer, 1863, Pachyarches Lederer, 1863)
- Poliobotys J. C. Shaffer & Munroe, 2007
- Polygrammodes Guenée, 1854 (= Astura Guenée, 1854, Dichocrocopsis Dyar, 1910, misspelling Dichocropsis Munroe, 1983, Hilaopsis Lederer, 1863)
- Polygrammopsis Munroe, 1960
- Polythlipta Lederer, 1863
- Prenesta Snellen, 1875 (= misspelling Praenesta Hampson, 1899)
- Pygospila Guenée, 1854 (= Lomotropa Lederer, 1863, Telespasta C. Swinhoe, 1906, misspelling Pygosspila Lederer, 1863)
- Radessa Munroe, 1977
- Rhagoba Moore, 1888
- Rhimphalea Lederer, 1863
- Sinomphisa Munroe, 1958
- Sparagmia Guenée, 1854
- Stemorrhages Lederer, 1863 (= misspelling Stemmorhages)
- Synclera Lederer, 1863 (= misspellings Sinclera Swinhoe & Cotes, 1889, Synctera Möschler, 1886)
- Syngamilyta Strand, 1920
- Talanga Moore, 1885
- Terastia Guenée, 1854 (= misspelling Tersatia Lederer, 1863)
- Tessema J. F. G. Clarke, 1986
- Tyspanodes Warren, 1891 (= misspelling Thyspanodes Caradja, 1925
- Uncobotyodes Kirti & Rose, 1990
- Zebronia Hübner, 1821
