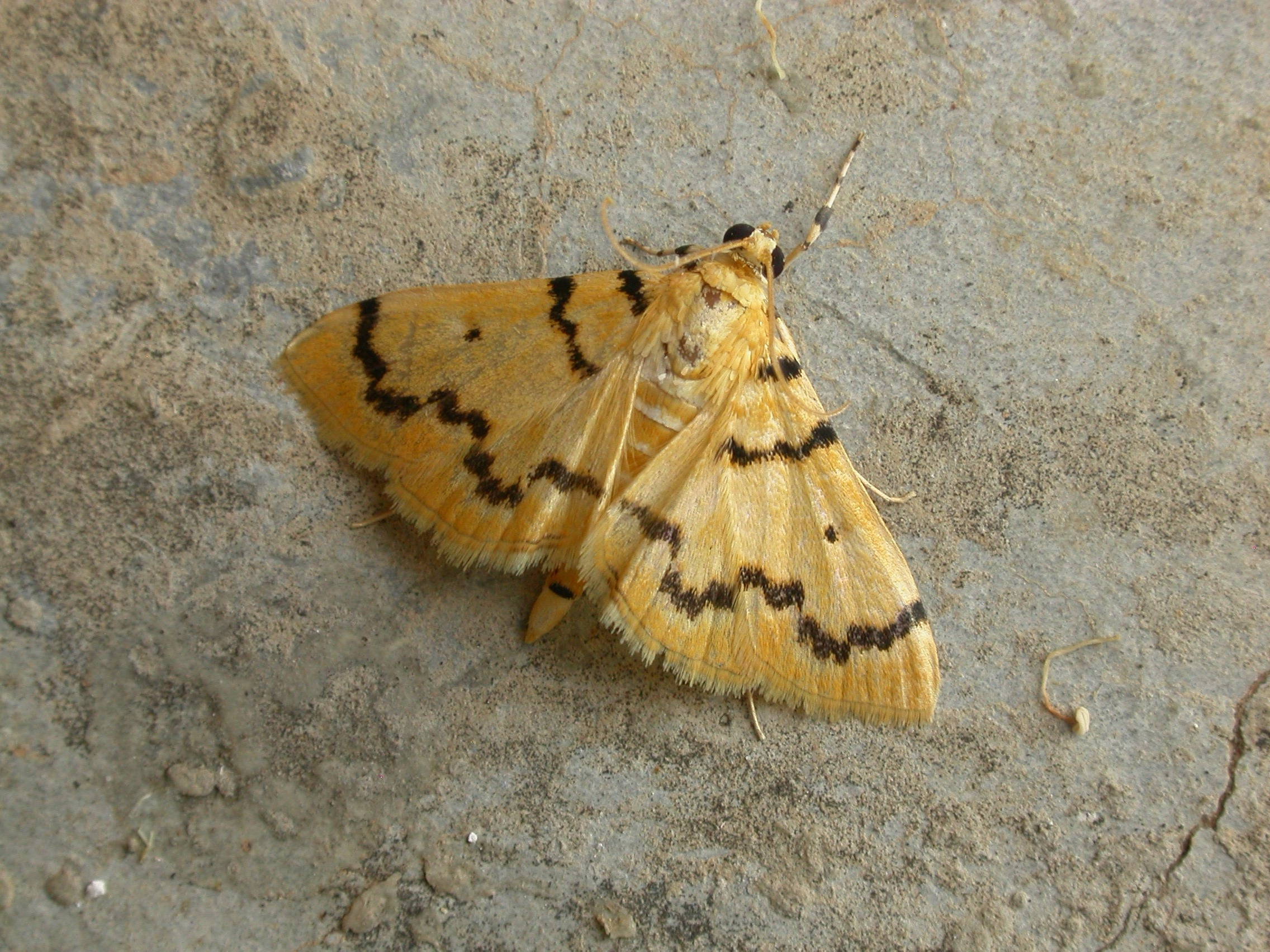
- Dichocrocis clytusalis

Scientific classification
- Kingdom: Animalia
- Phylum: Arthropoda
- Clade: Pancrustacea
- Class: Insecta
- Order: Lepidoptera
- Family: Crambidae
- Subfamily: Spilomelinae
- Genus: Dichocrocis; Lederer, 1863

Synonyms
- Zebrodes Warren, 1896; Dichocrosis Janse, 1917 (misspelling); Dichocroscis Swinhoe & Cotes, 1889 (misspelling)

= Dichocrocis =

Genus of moths

Dichocrocis is a genus of moths in the family Crambidae described by Julius Lederer in 1863.

Dichocrocis in its current composition is considered polyphyletic, with many of its species misplaced. However, the type species, D. frenatalis, was found to be placed in the tribe Steniini in a 2025 phylogenetic study.

== Species ==
- Dichocrocis acoluthalis West, 1931
- Dichocrocis actinialis Hampson, 1899
- Dichocrocis albilunalis Hampson, 1912
- Dichocrocis alluaudalis Viette, 1953
- Dichocrocis atrisectalis Hampson, 1908
- Dichocrocis attemptalis (Snellen, 1890)
- Dichocrocis bilinealis Hampson, 1896
- Dichocrocis bimaculalis Kenrick, 1907
- Dichocrocis biplagialis Hampson, 1918
- Dichocrocis bistrigalis (Walker, 1866)
- Dichocrocis catalalis Viette, 1953
- Dichocrocis clystalis Schaus, 1920)
- Dichocrocis clytusalis (Walker, 1859)
- Dichocrocis credulalis (Snellen, 1890)
- Dichocrocis crocodora (Meyrick, 1934)
- Dichocrocis definita (Butler, 1889)
- Dichocrocis dehradunensis Pajni & Rose, 1977
- Dichocrocis dorsipunctalis Schaus, 1927
- Dichocrocis erixantha (Meyrick, 1886)
- Dichocrocis eubulealis (Walker, 1859)
- Dichocrocis ferialis Joannis, 1929
- Dichocrocis festivalis (Swinhoe, 1886)
- Dichocrocis frenatalis Lederer, 1863
- Dichocrocis fuscifimbria Warren, 1896
- Dichocrocis fuscoalbalis Hampson, 1899
- Dichocrocis galmeralis Schaus, 1927
- Dichocrocis gyacalis Schaus, 1920
- Dichocrocis klotsi Oajni & Rose, 1977
- Dichocrocis latipunctalis Caradja, 1925
- Dichocrocis leptalis Hampson, 1903
- Dichocrocis leucostolalis Hampson, 1918
- Dichocrocis liparalis West, 1931
- Dichocrocis loxophora Hampson, 1912
- Dichocrocis macrostidza Hampson, 1912
- Dichocrocis megillalis (Walker, 1859)
- Dichocrocis nigricinctalis Hampson, 1912
- Dichocrocis pardalis Kenrick, 1907
- Dichocrocis penniger Dyar, 1913
- Dichocrocis philippinensis Hampson, 1912
- Dichocrocis plenistigmalis (Warren, 1895)
- Dichocrocis pseudpoeonalis Hampson, 1898
- Dichocrocis punctilinealis Hampson, 1899
- Dichocrocis pyrrhalis (Walker, 1859)
- Dichocrocis rigidalis (Snellen, 1890)
- Dichocrocis rubritinctalis Hampson, 1918
- Dichocrocis strigimarginalis Hampson, 1899
- Dichocrocis tigridalis Mabille, 1900
- Dichocrocis tlapalis Schaus, 1920
- Dichocrocis tripunctapex Hampson, 1899
- Dichocrocis tyranthes Meyrick, 1897
- Dichocrocis xanthocyma Hampson, 1898
- Dichocrocis xanthoplagalis Hampson, 1912
- Dichocrocis xuthusalis (Walker, 1859)
- Dichocrocis zebralis (Moore, 1867)

== Former species ==
- Dichocrocis evaxalis (Walker, 1859), now placed in Conogethes
- Dichocrocis pandamalis (Walker, 1859), now placed in Conogethes
- Dichocrocis plutusalis (Walker, 1859), now placed in Orthospila
- Dichocrocis punctiferalis (Guenée, 1854) , now placed in Conogethes
- Dichocrocis surusalis (Walker, 1859) , now placed in Rehimena
- Mabilleodes catalalis Viette, 1953, which had been confused with Dichocrocis catalalis Viette, 1953; both are separate species occurring on Madagascar.
