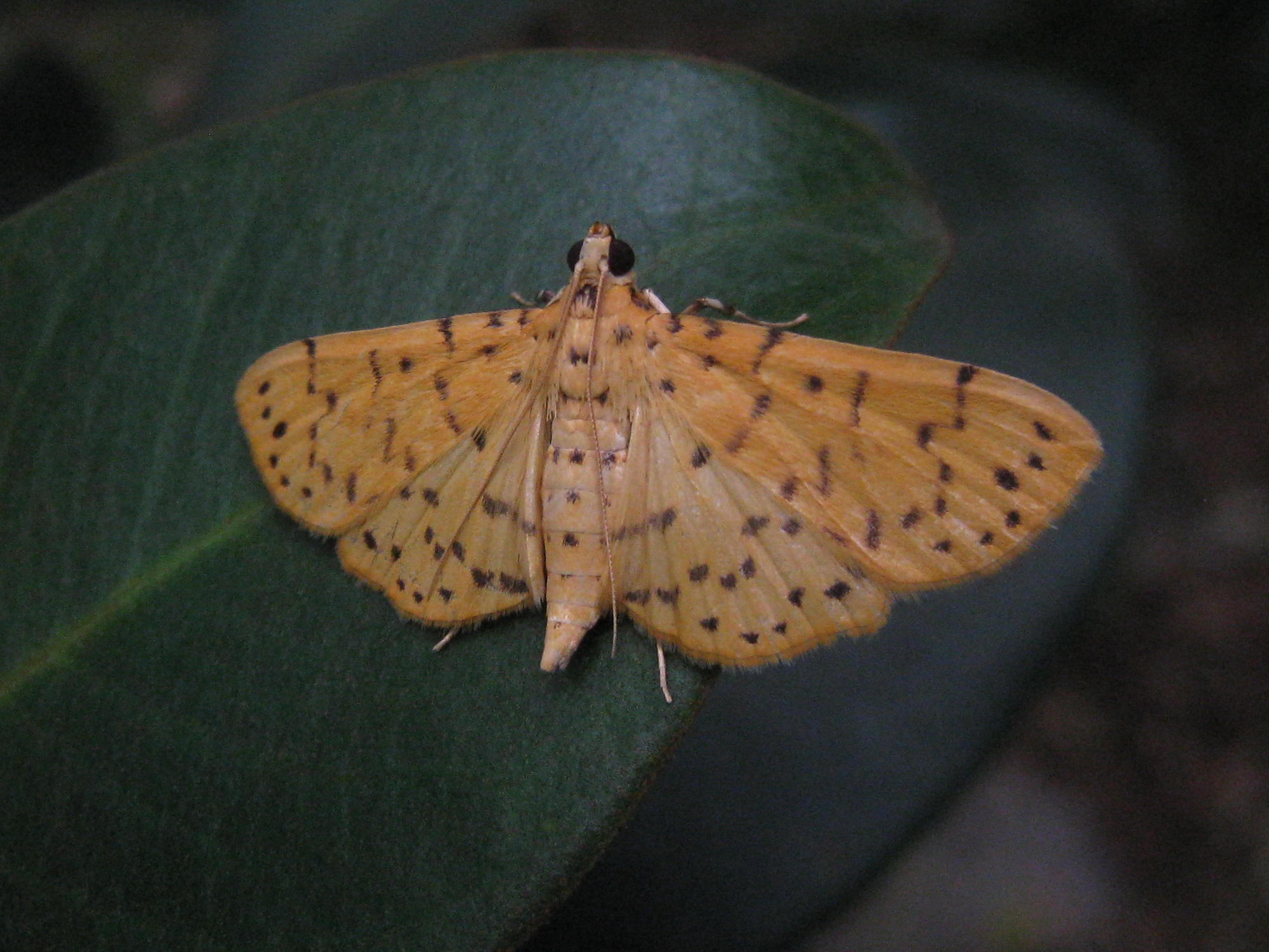
- Conogethes punctiferalis

Scientific classification
- Kingdom: Animalia
- Phylum: Arthropoda
- Clade: Pancrustacea
- Class: Insecta
- Order: Lepidoptera
- Family: Crambidae
- Subfamily: Spilomelinae
- Tribe: Margaroniini
- Genus: Conogethes; Meyrick, 1884

Synonyms
- Dadessa Moore, 1886

= Conogethes =

Genus of moths

Conogethes is a genus of moths in the subfamily Spilomelinae of the family Crambidae. The currently 17 recognized species are distributed in the Indomalayan and Australasian realm.

The genus contains several species that are considered pests on economically important food plants such as Ipomoea, Elettaria and Curcuma, on ornamental plants like Alpinia, and on Shorea, Dipterocarpus and several genera of the pine family, which are used as timber trees.

Within Spilomelinae, Conogethes is placed in the species-rich tribus Margaroniini, where it was found to be closely related to the genera Azochis, Ghesquierellana and Megastes. Imagines of Conogethes resemble in their wing pattern those of Marwitzia, the Polygrammodes eleuata species complex and Syllepte incomptalis, and to a lesser degree Dichocrocis, Notarcha and Trigonobela.

The polyphagous Conogethes punctiferalis is a major pest species in India, Southeast Asia and Australia and has therefore been the focus of extensive research. In several cases, populations of C. punctiferalis associated with different hosts were found, eventually resulting in the recognition of different species, such as C. parvipunctalis, C. pinicolalis and C. sahyadriensis. DNA barcoding data indicates several additional undescribed species, and a comprehensive taxonomic revision of the genus is required to unravel the validity and circumscription of these new species.

DNA barcode data for altogether 25 operational taxonomic units or BINs (Barcode Index Numbers) of Conogethes are stored in the Barcode of Life Data System (BOLD), although only sequences of 19 of these BINs (or putative species) are publicly accessible.

== Species ==
- Conogethes clioalis (Walker, 1859)
- Conogethes diminutiva Warren, 1896
- Conogethes ersealis (Walker, 1859)
- Conogethes evaxalis (Walker, 1859)
- Conogethes haemactalis Snellen, 1890
- Conogethes minimastis Meyrick, 1897
- Conogethes pandamalis (Walker, 1859)
- Conogethes parvipunctalis Inoue & Yamanaka, 2006
- Conogethes pinicolalis Inoue & Yamanaka, 2006
- Conogethes pluto (Butler, 1887)
- Conogethes punctiferalis (Guenée, 1854)
- Conogethes sahyadriensis Shashank, Kammar, Mally & Chakravarthy, 2018
- Conogethes semifascialis (Walker, 1866)
- Conogethes spirotricha Meyrick, 1934
- Conogethes tenuialalis Chaovalit & Yoshiyasu in Chaovalit, Yoshiyasu, Hirai & Pinkaew, 2019
- Conogethes tharsalea (Meyrick, 1887)
- Conogethes umbrosa Meyrick, 1886
