= Dichocrocis catalalis =

Scientific classification
- Kingdom: Animalia
- Phylum: Arthropoda
- Clade: Pancrustacea
- Class: Insecta
- Order: Lepidoptera
- Family: Crambidae
- Genus: Dichocrocis
- Species: D. catalalis

Binomial name
- Dichocrocis catalalis Viette, 1953

Species of moth

Dichocrocis catalalis is a moth in the subfamily Spilomelinae of the family Crambidae. It was described by Pierre Viette in 1953.

The species might be found placed in the Odontiinae genus Autocharis, but this concerns a second species with the same species epithet described by the same author in the same year, but in a different genus: Mecyna catalalis Viette, 1953, now placed in the genus Mabilleodes as M. catalalis.
