= Orthospila =

Scientific classification
- Kingdom: Animalia
- Phylum: Arthropoda
- Clade: Pancrustacea
- Class: Insecta
- Order: Lepidoptera
- Family: Crambidae
- Subfamily: Spilomelinae
- Genus: Orthospila; Warren, 1890

Genus of moths

Orthospila is a genus of moths of the family Crambidae. The genus was first described by William Warren in 1890.

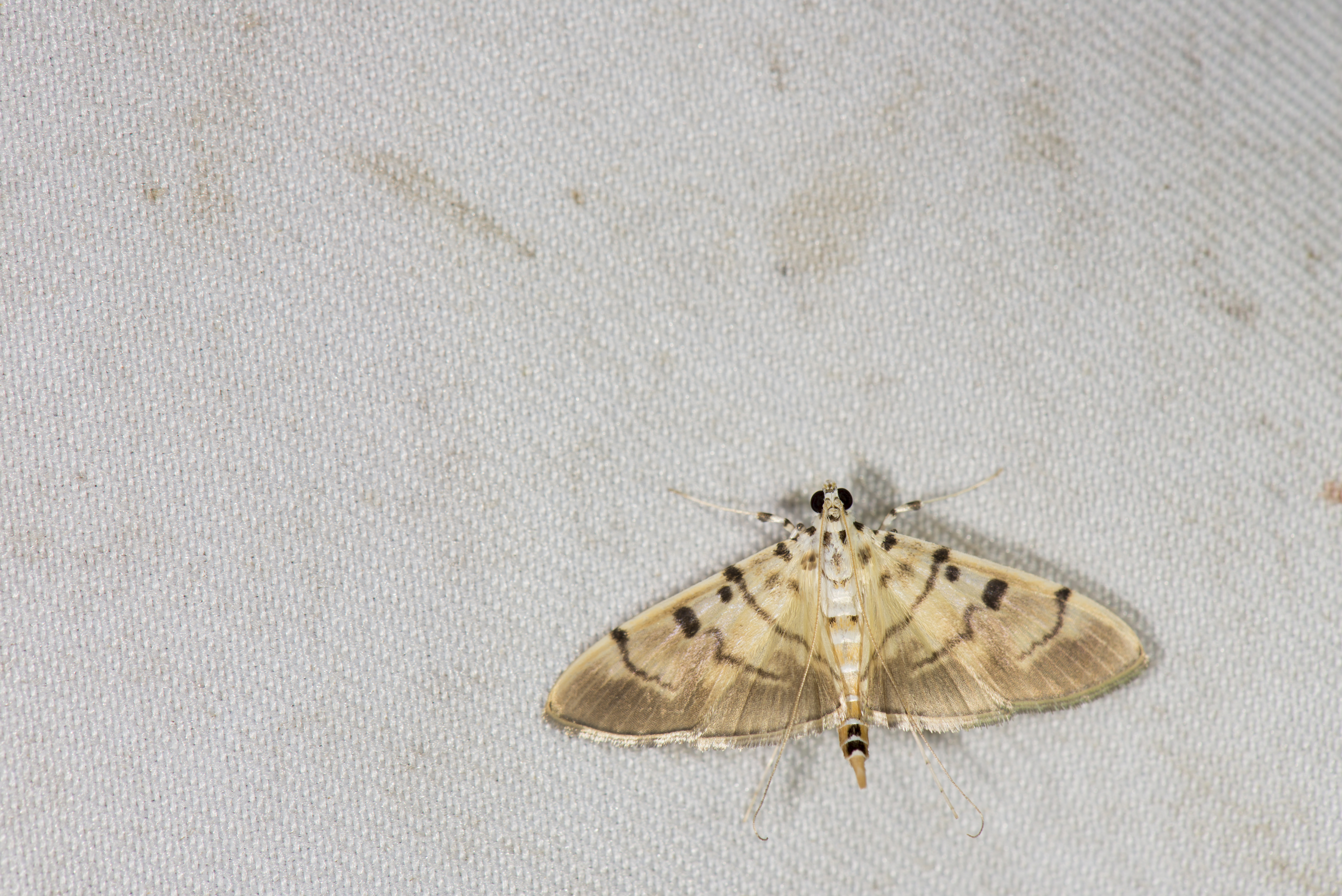
Orthospila definita by LiCheng Shih

See also scheme in GlobIZ database with the similar Dichocrocis pyrrhalis (Walker, 1859) instead under Dichocrocis Lederer, 1863. Else in some schemes Dichocrocis definita (Butler, 1889) may be also listed as an additional species of Orthospila sp.

== Species ==
- Orthospila orissusalis (Walker, 1859)
- Orthospila plutusalis (Walker, 1859)
- Orthospila tigrina (Moore, [1886])
