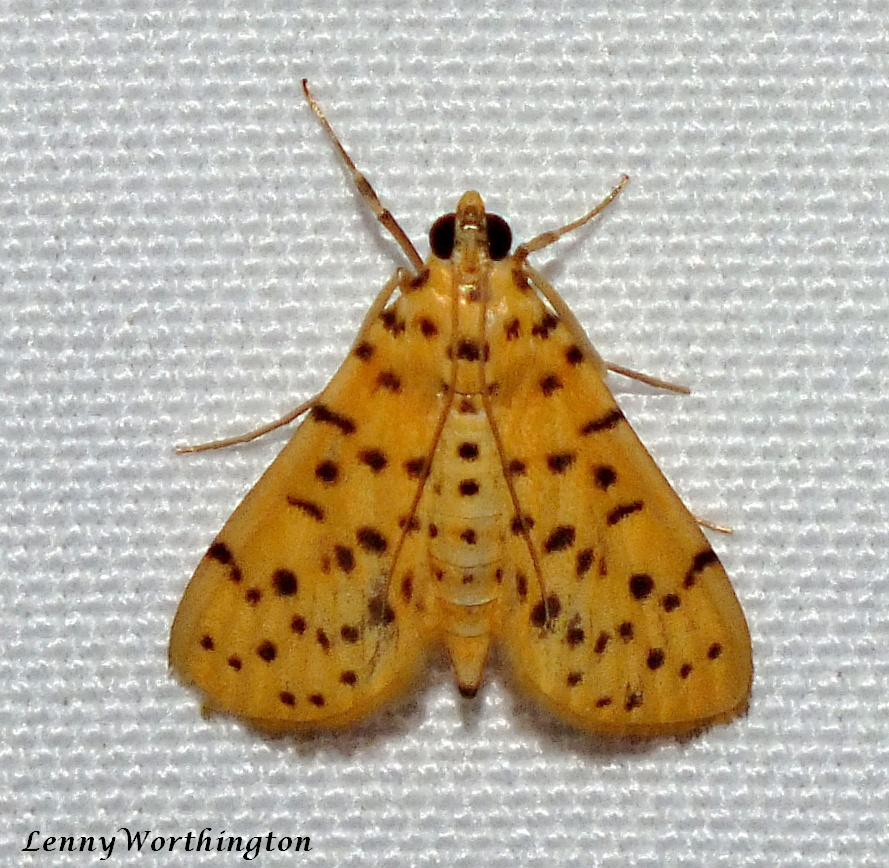

Scientific classification
- Kingdom: Animalia
- Phylum: Arthropoda
- Class: Insecta
- Order: Lepidoptera
- Family: Crambidae
- Genus: Conogethes
- Species: C. pluto

Binomial name
- Conogethes pluto (Butler, 1887)

Synonyms
- Omiodes pluto Butler, 1887

= Conogethes pluto =

Species of moth

Conogethes pluto is a moth in the family Crambidae. It was described by Arthur Gardiner Butler in 1887. It is found on the Solomon Islands and in Burma, Thailand and Australia. The habitat consists of dry sclerophyll forests and wet lowland tropical rainforests.

The larvae feed on ginger species. They bore the stem of their host plant.
