= Azochis trichotarsalis =

Scientific classification
- Kingdom: Animalia
- Phylum: Arthropoda
- Class: Insecta
- Order: Lepidoptera
- Family: Crambidae
- Genus: Azochis
- Species: A. trichotarsalis

Binomial name
- Azochis trichotarsalis Hampson, 1918

Species of moth

Azochis trichotarsalis is a moth in the family Crambidae. It was described by George Hampson in 1918. It is found in Venezuela.
