= Dichocrocis albilunalis =

Scientific classification
- Kingdom: Animalia
- Phylum: Arthropoda
- Clade: Pancrustacea
- Class: Insecta
- Order: Lepidoptera
- Family: Crambidae
- Genus: Dichocrocis
- Species: D. albilunalis

Binomial name
- Dichocrocis albilunalis Hampson, 1912

Synonyms
- Dracaenura griseotinctalis Rothschild, 1915

Species of moth

Dichocrocis albilunalis is a moth in the family Crambidae. It was described by George Hampson in 1912. It is found in Papua New Guinea.
