= Dichocrocis festivalis =

Scientific classification
- Kingdom: Animalia
- Phylum: Arthropoda
- Clade: Pancrustacea
- Class: Insecta
- Order: Lepidoptera
- Family: Crambidae
- Genus: Dichocrocis
- Species: D. festivalis

Binomial name
- Dichocrocis festivalis (C. Swinhoe, 1886)

Synonyms
- Astura festivalis C. Swinhoe, 1886

Species of moth

Dichocrocis festivalis is a moth in the family Crambidae. It was described by Charles Swinhoe in 1886. It is found in Mumbai, India.
