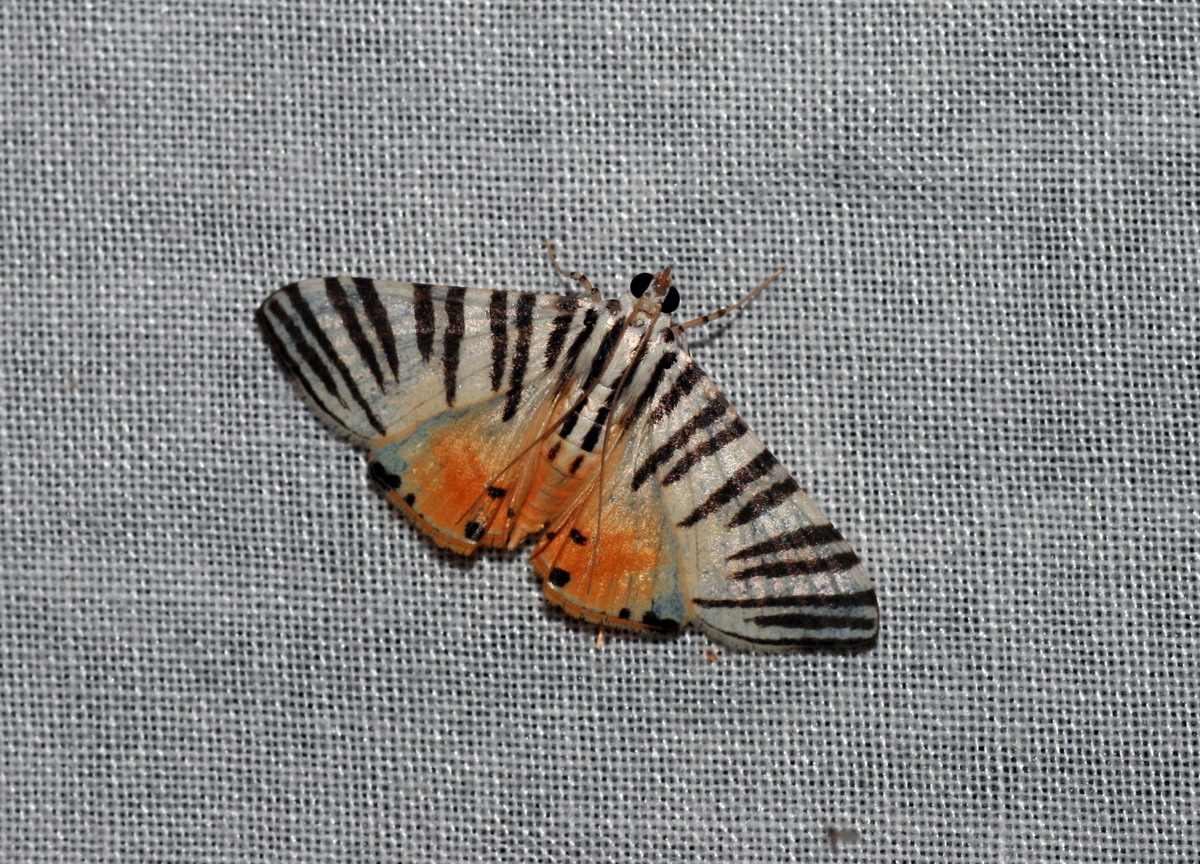

Scientific classification
- Kingdom: Animalia
- Phylum: Arthropoda
- Clade: Pancrustacea
- Class: Insecta
- Order: Lepidoptera
- Family: Crambidae
- Genus: Dichocrocis
- Species: D. zebralis

Binomial name
- Dichocrocis zebralis (Moore, 1867)

Synonyms
- Pycnarmon zebralis Moore, 1867

= Dichocrocis zebralis =

Species of moth

Dichocrocis zebralis is a moth in the family Crambidae. It was described by Frederic Moore in 1867. It is found in Darjeeling, India.
