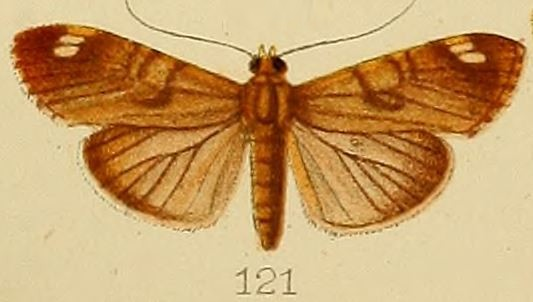

Scientific classification
- Kingdom: Animalia
- Phylum: Arthropoda
- Clade: Pancrustacea
- Class: Insecta
- Order: Lepidoptera
- Family: Crambidae
- Genus: Dichocrocis
- Species: D. bimaculalis

Binomial name
- Dichocrocis bimaculalis Kenrick, 1907

= Dichocrocis bimaculalis =

Species of moth

Dichocrocis bimaculalis is a species of moth of the family Crambidae. It is found in Papua New Guinea.

It has a wingspan of 31mm.
