= Dichocrocis tlapalis =

Scientific classification
- Kingdom: Animalia
- Phylum: Arthropoda
- Clade: Pancrustacea
- Class: Insecta
- Order: Lepidoptera
- Family: Crambidae
- Genus: Dichocrocis
- Species: D. tlapalis

Binomial name
- Dichocrocis tlapalis Schaus, 1920

Species of moth

Dichocrocis tlapalis is a moth in the family Crambidae. It was described by Schaus in 1920. It is found in Mexico.
