= Dichocrocis leucostolalis =

Scientific classification
- Kingdom: Animalia
- Phylum: Arthropoda
- Clade: Pancrustacea
- Class: Insecta
- Order: Lepidoptera
- Family: Crambidae
- Genus: Dichocrocis
- Species: D. leucostolalis

Binomial name
- Dichocrocis leucostolalis Hampson, 1918

Species of moth

Dichocrocis leucostolalis is a moth in the family Crambidae. It was described by George Hampson in 1918. It is found in Peru.
