= Conogethes haemactalis =

Scientific classification
- Kingdom: Animalia
- Phylum: Arthropoda
- Class: Insecta
- Order: Lepidoptera
- Family: Crambidae
- Genus: Conogethes
- Species: C. haemactalis

Binomial name
- Conogethes haemactalis Snellen, 1890

Synonyms
- Conogethes nubifera Lucas, 1892

Species of moth

Conogethes haemactalis is a moth in the family Crambidae. It was described by Snellen in 1890. It is found in north-eastern India, on Borneo and Sumbawa and in Australia, where it has been recorded from Queensland, New South Wales and Victoria.

The wingspan is about 30 mm. Adults are yellow with a dark red pattern.
