= Ghesquierellana thaumasia =

Scientific classification
- Kingdom: Animalia
- Phylum: Arthropoda
- Class: Insecta
- Order: Lepidoptera
- Family: Crambidae
- Genus: Ghesquierellana
- Species: G. thaumasia

Binomial name
- Ghesquierellana thaumasia Munroe, 1959

Species of moth

Ghesquierellana thaumasia is a moth in the family Crambidae. It was described by Eugene G. Munroe in 1959. It is found in Cameroon.
