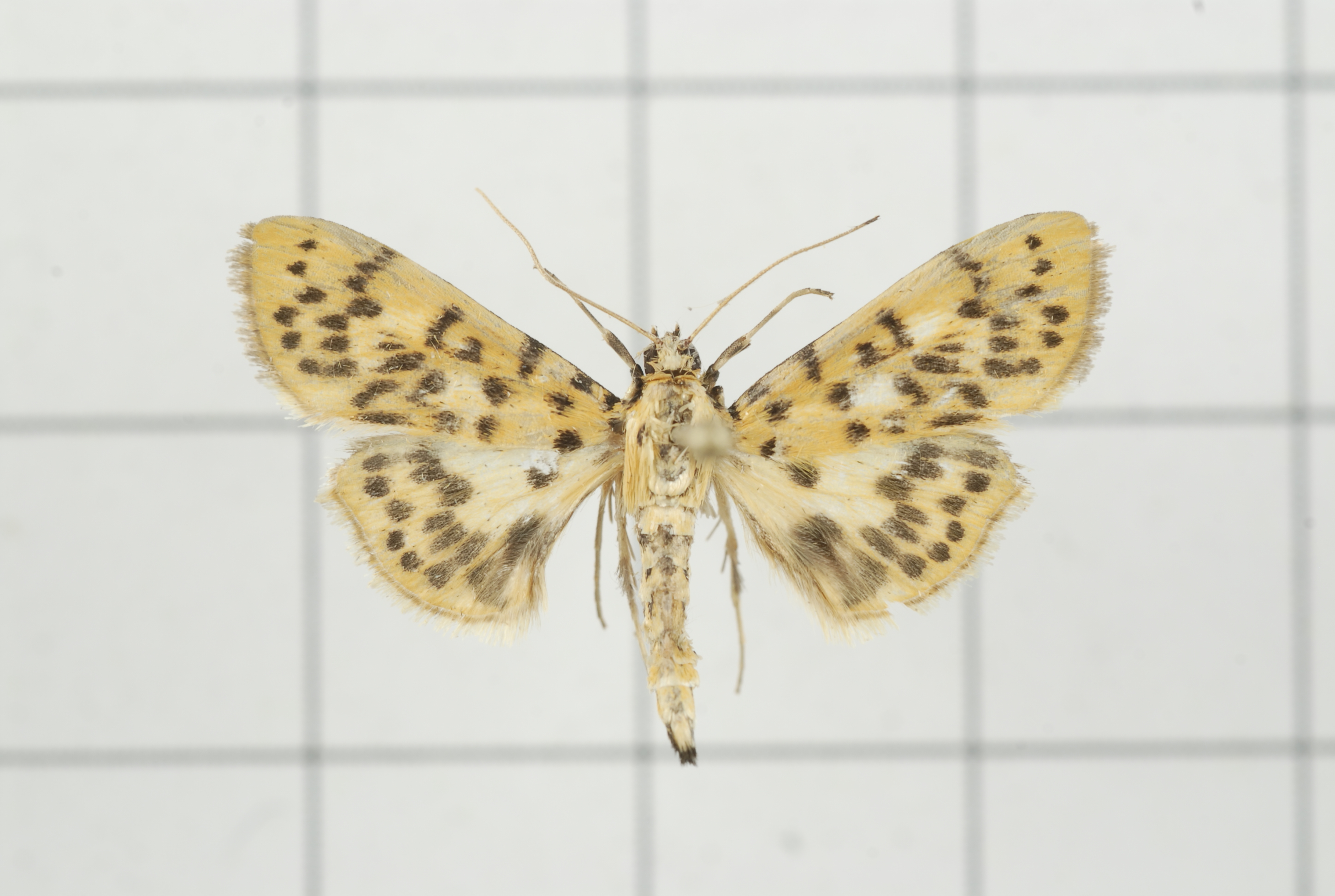

Scientific classification
- Kingdom: Animalia
- Phylum: Arthropoda
- Class: Insecta
- Order: Lepidoptera
- Family: Crambidae
- Genus: Conogethes
- Species: C. pinicolalis

Binomial name
- Conogethes pinicolalis Inoue & Yamanaka, 2006

= Conogethes pinicolalis =

Species of moth

Conogethes pinicolalis is a moth in the diverse subfamily Spilomelinae of the family Crambidae. It was described by Hiroshi Inoue and Hiroshi Yamanaka in 2006, and is found in East and Southeast Asia, with records from Japan, Korea, China (Guangdong), Taiwan and Thailand.

In Japan, the caterpillars have been recorded to feed on a range of conifers, such as Pinus densiflora, Pinus thunbergii, Pinus strobus, Pinus parviflora, Picea jezoensis, Tsuga sieboldii, Larix kaempferi, Abies sachalinensis, Abies firma, Cedrus deodara, Cedrus atlantica and Cedrus libani.
