= Dichocrocis alluaudalis =

Scientific classification
- Kingdom: Animalia
- Phylum: Arthropoda
- Clade: Pancrustacea
- Class: Insecta
- Order: Lepidoptera
- Family: Crambidae
- Genus: Dichocrocis
- Species: D. alluaudalis

Binomial name
- Dichocrocis alluaudalis Viette, 1953

Species of moth

Dichocrocis alluaudalis is a species of moth of the family Crambidae.

It can be found in South Madagascar. The holotype had been collected Ambovombe in the region of Androy.

Its wingspan is 24 mm.
