= Azochis rufidiscalis =

Scientific classification
- Kingdom: Animalia
- Phylum: Arthropoda
- Class: Insecta
- Order: Lepidoptera
- Family: Crambidae
- Genus: Azochis
- Species: A. rufidiscalis

Binomial name
- Azochis rufidiscalis Hampson, 1904

Synonyms
- Azochis cubanalis Hampson, 1913

Species of moth

Azochis rufidiscalis is a moth in the family Crambidae. It was described by George Hampson in 1904. It is found in the Bahamas, Hispaniola, Puerto Rico, Cuba and the south-eastern United States, where it has been recorded from Florida.

The wingspan is about 22–26 mm. The forewings are white with a blackish and rufous basal patch in and beyond the end of the cell. There is a fuscous and rufous postmedial line and a triangular black mark on the termen. The hindwings are semihyaline white with a patch of black scales near the tornus. Adults have been recorded on wing from January to March, in May, July and September.
