= Rehimena reductalis =

Scientific classification
- Domain: Eukaryota
- Kingdom: Animalia
- Phylum: Arthropoda
- Class: Insecta
- Order: Lepidoptera
- Family: Crambidae
- Genus: Rehimena
- Species: R. reductalis

Binomial name
- Rehimena reductalis Caradja, 1932

Species of moth

Rehimena reductalis is a moth in the family Crambidae. It was described by Aristide Caradja in 1932. It is found in Shanghai, China.
