= Dichocrocis strigimarginalis =

Scientific classification
- Kingdom: Animalia
- Phylum: Arthropoda
- Clade: Pancrustacea
- Class: Insecta
- Order: Lepidoptera
- Family: Crambidae
- Genus: Dichocrocis
- Species: D. strigimarginalis

Binomial name
- Dichocrocis strigimarginalis Hampson, 1899

Species of moth

Dichocrocis strigimarginalis is a moth in the family Crambidae. It is found in Brazil (Amazon region).
