= Conogethes clioalis =

Scientific classification
- Kingdom: Animalia
- Phylum: Arthropoda
- Class: Insecta
- Order: Lepidoptera
- Family: Crambidae
- Genus: Conogethes
- Species: C. clioalis

Binomial name
- Conogethes clioalis (Walker, 1859)

Synonyms
- Astura clioalis Walker, 1859

Species of moth

Conogethes clioalis is a moth in the family Crambidae. It was described by Francis Walker in 1859. It is found on Borneo.
