= Azochis ruscialis =

Scientific classification
- Kingdom: Animalia
- Phylum: Arthropoda
- Class: Insecta
- Order: Lepidoptera
- Family: Crambidae
- Genus: Azochis
- Species: A. ruscialis

Binomial name
- Azochis ruscialis (H. Druce, 1895)

Synonyms
- Leucochroma ruscialis H. Druce, 1895

Species of moth

Azochis ruscialis is a moth in the family Crambidae. It was described by Herbert Druce in 1895. It is found in Panama.
