= Dichocrocis nigricinctalis =

Scientific classification
- Kingdom: Animalia
- Phylum: Arthropoda
- Clade: Pancrustacea
- Class: Insecta
- Order: Lepidoptera
- Family: Crambidae
- Genus: Dichocrocis
- Species: D. nigricinctalis

Binomial name
- Dichocrocis nigricinctalis Hampson, 1912

Species of moth

Dichocrocis nigricinctalis is a moth in the family Crambidae. It was described by George Hampson in 1912. It is found in Papua New Guinea and Kenya.
