= Dichocrocis pseudpoeonalis =

Scientific classification
- Kingdom: Animalia
- Phylum: Arthropoda
- Clade: Pancrustacea
- Class: Insecta
- Order: Lepidoptera
- Family: Crambidae
- Genus: Dichocrocis
- Species: D. pseudpoeonalis

Binomial name
- Dichocrocis pseudpoeonalis Hampson, 1898

Species of moth

Dichocrocis pseudpoeonalis is a moth in the family Crambidae. It was described by George Hampson in 1898. It is found in Western New Guinea, Indonesia.
