= Dichocrocis bilinealis =

Scientific classification
- Kingdom: Animalia
- Phylum: Arthropoda
- Clade: Pancrustacea
- Class: Insecta
- Order: Lepidoptera
- Family: Crambidae
- Genus: Dichocrocis
- Species: D. bilinealis

Binomial name
- Dichocrocis bilinealis Hampson, 1896

Species of moth

Dichocrocis bilinealis is a moth in the family Crambidae. It was described by George Hampson in 1896. It is found in Myanmar and Thailand.
