= Mabilleodes lithosialis =

Scientific classification
- Kingdom: Animalia
- Phylum: Arthropoda
- Class: Insecta
- Order: Lepidoptera
- Family: Crambidae
- Genus: Mabilleodes
- Species: M. lithosialis

Binomial name
- Mabilleodes lithosialis (Hampson, 1899)

Synonyms
- Pyrausta lithosialis Hampson, 1899

Species of moth

Mabilleodes lithosialis is a moth in the family Crambidae. It was described by George Hampson in 1899. It is found in South Africa.
