= Azochis rufifrontalis =

Scientific classification
- Kingdom: Animalia
- Phylum: Arthropoda
- Class: Insecta
- Order: Lepidoptera
- Family: Crambidae
- Genus: Azochis
- Species: A. rufifrontalis

Binomial name
- Azochis rufifrontalis (Hampson, 1895)

Synonyms
- Stenophyes rufifrontalis Hampson, 1895

Species of moth

Azochis rufifrontalis is a moth in the family Crambidae. It is found on Saint Vincent and Saint Lucia.
