= Rehimena auritincta =

Scientific classification
- Domain: Eukaryota
- Kingdom: Animalia
- Phylum: Arthropoda
- Class: Insecta
- Order: Lepidoptera
- Family: Crambidae
- Genus: Rehimena
- Species: R. auritincta

Binomial name
- Rehimena auritincta (Butler, 1886)

Synonyms
- Scopula auritincta Butler, 1886; Dichocrocis xanthias Turner, 1913

Species of moth

Rehimena auritincta is a moth in the family Crambidae. It was described by Arthur Gardiner Butler in 1886. It is found in Australia, where it has been recorded from Queensland.

The wingspan is about 25 mm. The wings are golden ochraceous, the forewings paler towards the inner margin and the base of the wing crossed by a broad imperfect greyish-brown 8-shaped figure. There is a quadrate spot closing the cell, and a second large oblique S-shaped figure crossing the disc. This figure is formed by an angulated discal stripe united just about its central angle to a 3-shaped submarginal stripe. Neither of these stripes extend to the costal or inner margins. The hindwings are considerably paler than the forewings, except along the outer margin. There is an indistinct greyish apical border.
