= Rehimena cissophora =

Scientific classification
- Domain: Eukaryota
- Kingdom: Animalia
- Phylum: Arthropoda
- Class: Insecta
- Order: Lepidoptera
- Family: Crambidae
- Genus: Rehimena
- Species: R. cissophora

Binomial name
- Rehimena cissophora (Turner, 1908)

Synonyms
- Entephria cissophora Turner, 1908; Dichocrocis chlorotypa Turner, 1941

Species of moth

Rehimena cissophora is a moth in the family Crambidae. It is found in Australia, where it has been recorded from Queensland and New South Wales.
