= Dichocrocis plenistigmalis =

Scientific classification
- Kingdom: Animalia
- Phylum: Arthropoda
- Clade: Pancrustacea
- Class: Insecta
- Order: Lepidoptera
- Family: Crambidae
- Genus: Dichocrocis
- Species: D. plenistigmalis

Binomial name
- Dichocrocis plenistigmalis (Warren, 1895)

Synonyms
- Pachybotys plenistigmalis Warren, 1895

Species of moth

Dichocrocis plenistigmalis is a moth in the family Crambidae. It was described by Warren in 1895. It is found in India (Khasia Hills).
