= Dichocrocis dorsipunctalis =

Scientific classification
- Kingdom: Animalia
- Phylum: Arthropoda
- Clade: Pancrustacea
- Class: Insecta
- Order: Lepidoptera
- Family: Crambidae
- Genus: Dichocrocis
- Species: D. dorsipunctalis

Binomial name
- Dichocrocis dorsipunctalis Schaus, 1927

Species of moth

Dichocrocis dorsipunctalis is a moth in the family Crambidae. It was described by Schaus in 1927. It is found in the Philippines (Luzon).
