= Mabilleodes anabalis =

Scientific classification
- Kingdom: Animalia
- Phylum: Arthropoda
- Class: Insecta
- Order: Lepidoptera
- Family: Crambidae
- Genus: Mabilleodes
- Species: M. anabalis

Binomial name
- Mabilleodes anabalis Viette, 1989

Species of moth

Mabilleodes anabalis is a moth in the family Crambidae. It was described by Viette in 1989. It is found in the Madagascar.
