= Rehimena leptophaes =

Scientific classification
- Domain: Eukaryota
- Kingdom: Animalia
- Phylum: Arthropoda
- Class: Insecta
- Order: Lepidoptera
- Family: Crambidae
- Genus: Rehimena
- Species: R. leptophaes

Binomial name
- Rehimena leptophaes (Turner, 1913)

Synonyms
- Dichocrocis leptophaes Turner, 1913

Species of moth

Rehimena leptophaes is a moth in the family Crambidae. It was described by Alfred Jefferis Turner in 1913. It is found in Australia, where it has been recorded from Queensland, New South Wales and the Australian Capital Territory.
