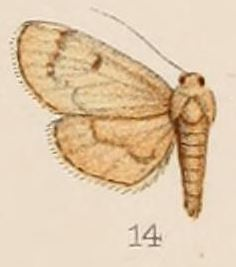

Scientific classification
- Kingdom: Animalia
- Phylum: Arthropoda
- Class: Insecta
- Order: Lepidoptera
- Family: Crambidae
- Genus: Rehimena
- Species: R. hypostictalis

Binomial name
- Rehimena hypostictalis Hampson, 1908

Synonyms
- Pilocrocis insignificalis Rothschild, 1915

= Rehimena hypostictalis =

Species of moth

Rehimena hypostictalis is a species of moth of the family Crambidae described by George Hampson in 1908. It is found in Sri Lanka and Papua New Guinea.

The wingspan of this species is 22–26 mm.
