= Rehimena unimaculalis =

Scientific classification
- Kingdom: Animalia
- Phylum: Arthropoda
- Class: Insecta
- Order: Lepidoptera
- Family: Crambidae
- Genus: Rehimena
- Species: R. unimaculalis

Binomial name
- Rehimena unimaculalis Hampson, 1912

Species of moth

Rehimena unimaculalis is a moth in the family Crambidae. It was described by George Hampson in 1912. It is found in Singapore.

The wingspan is about 16 mm. Adults are golden yellow, the forewings with a deep black discoidal lunule and traces of a terminal series of fuscous points. The hindwings are rather paler yellow, with a terminal black band between veins 7 and 2, expanding triangularly at vein 7 and then narrowing to a line.
