= Ghesquierellana tessellalis =

Scientific classification
- Kingdom: Animalia
- Phylum: Arthropoda
- Class: Insecta
- Order: Lepidoptera
- Family: Crambidae
- Genus: Ghesquierellana
- Species: G. tessellalis

Binomial name
- Ghesquierellana tessellalis (Gaede, 1917)

Synonyms
- Polygrammodes tessellalis Gaede, 1917

Species of moth

Ghesquierellana tessellalis is a moth in the family Crambidae. It was described by Max Gaede in 1917. It is found in Cameroon.
