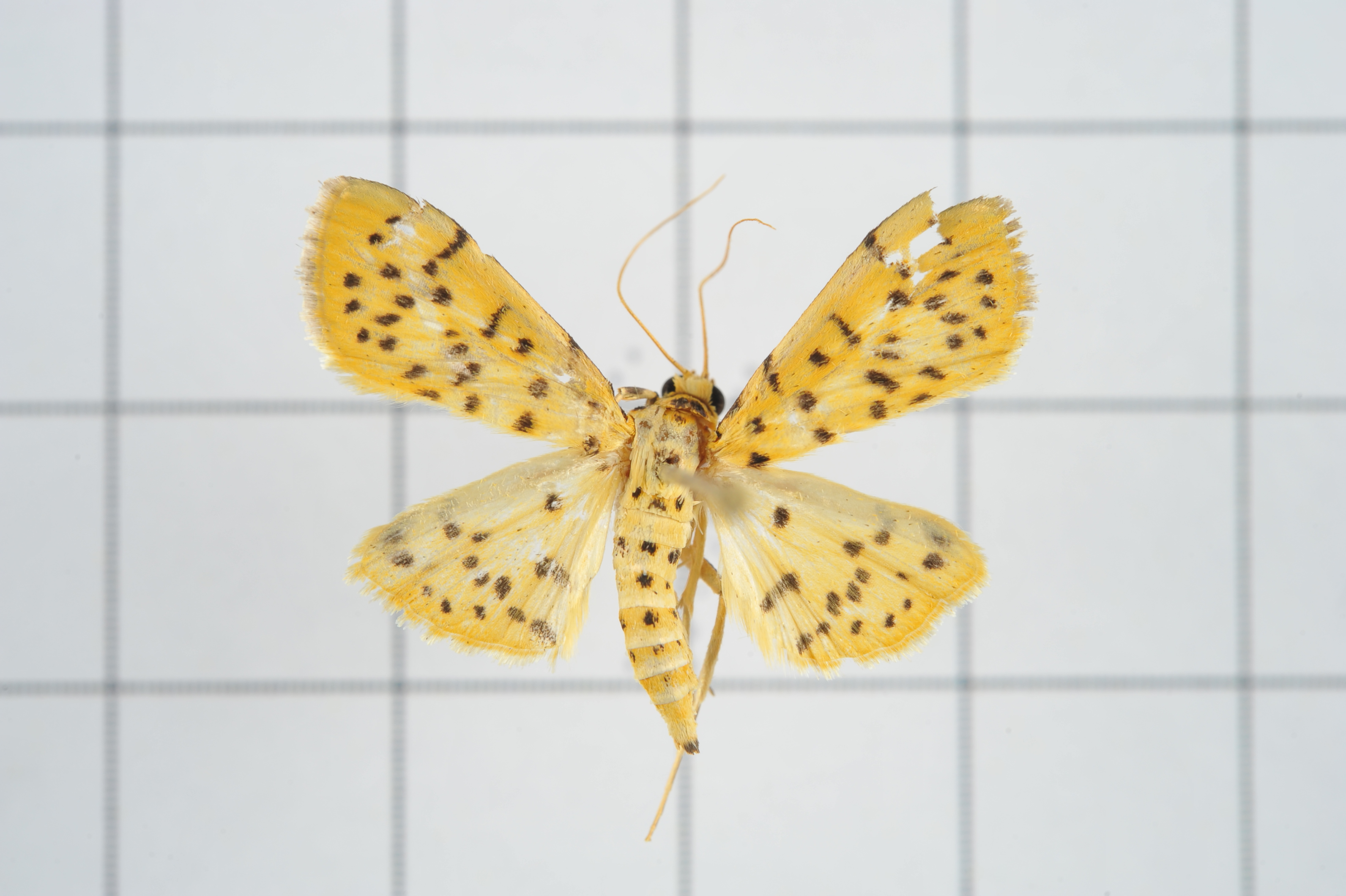

Scientific classification
- Kingdom: Animalia
- Phylum: Arthropoda
- Class: Insecta
- Order: Lepidoptera
- Family: Crambidae
- Genus: Conogethes
- Species: C. parvipunctalis

Binomial name
- Conogethes parvipunctalis Inoue & Yamanaka, 2006

= Conogethes parvipunctalis =

Species of moth

Conogethes parvipunctalis is a moth in the family Crambidae. It was described by Hiroshi Inoue and Hiroshi Yamanaka in 2006. It is found in Japan's Ryukyu Islands.
