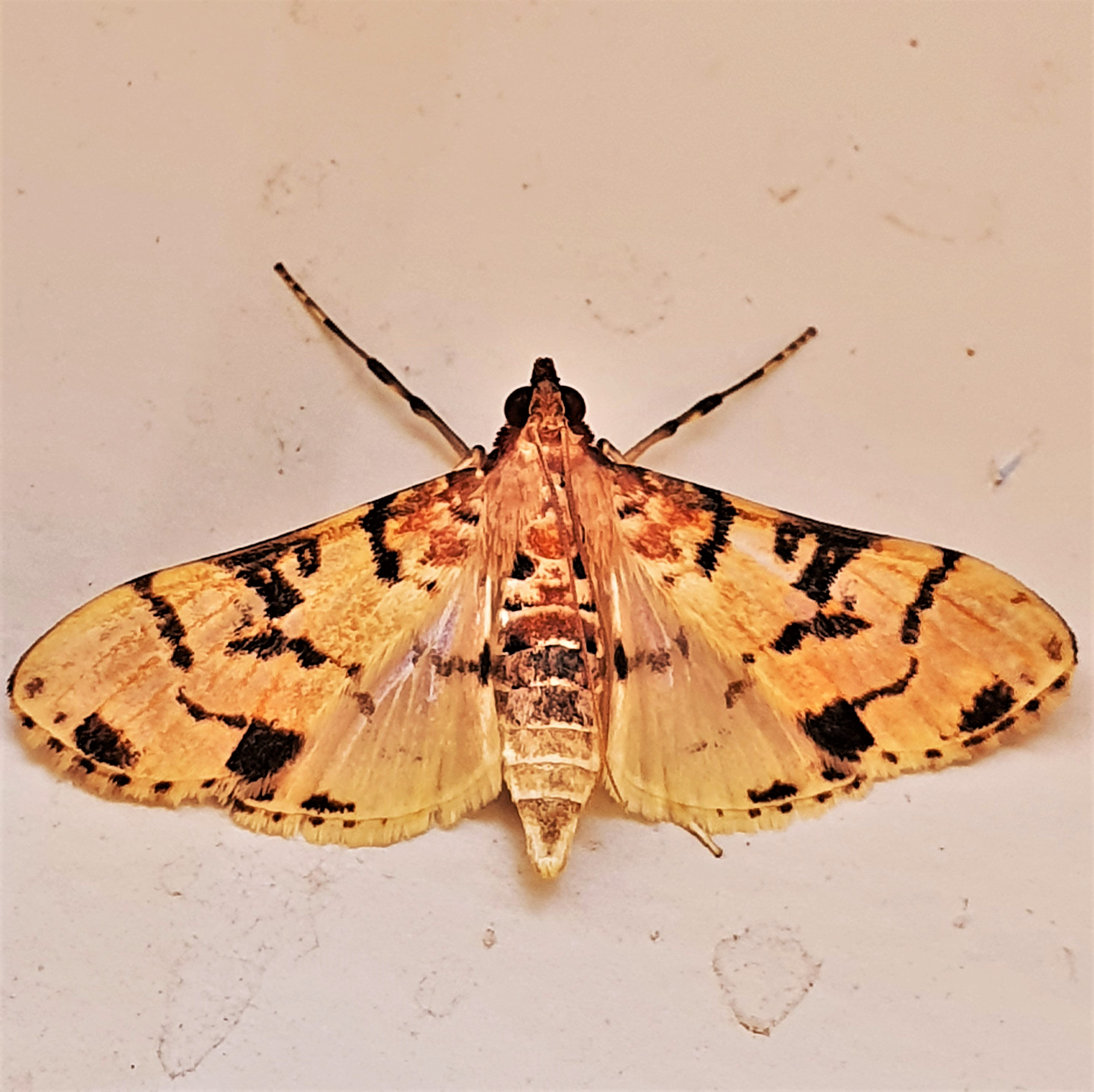

Scientific classification
- Kingdom: Animalia
- Phylum: Arthropoda
- Class: Insecta
- Order: Lepidoptera
- Family: Crambidae
- Genus: Azochis
- Species: A. gripusalis

Binomial name
- Azochis gripusalis Walker, 1859

Synonyms
- Botys saniosalis Lederer, 1863

= Azochis gripusalis =

Species of moth

Azochis gripusalis is a moth in the family Crambidae. It was described by Francis Walker in 1859. It is found in Brazil.

The wings are semihyaline (almost glasslike) with a testaceous tinge. There are three blackish transverse lines on the forewings. There are some black spots on the hindwings.
