= Azochis oncalis =

Scientific classification
- Kingdom: Animalia
- Phylum: Arthropoda
- Class: Insecta
- Order: Lepidoptera
- Family: Crambidae
- Genus: Azochis
- Species: A. oncalis

Binomial name
- Azochis oncalis Schaus, 1912

Species of moth

Azochis oncalis is a moth in the family Crambidae. It is found in Costa Rica.
