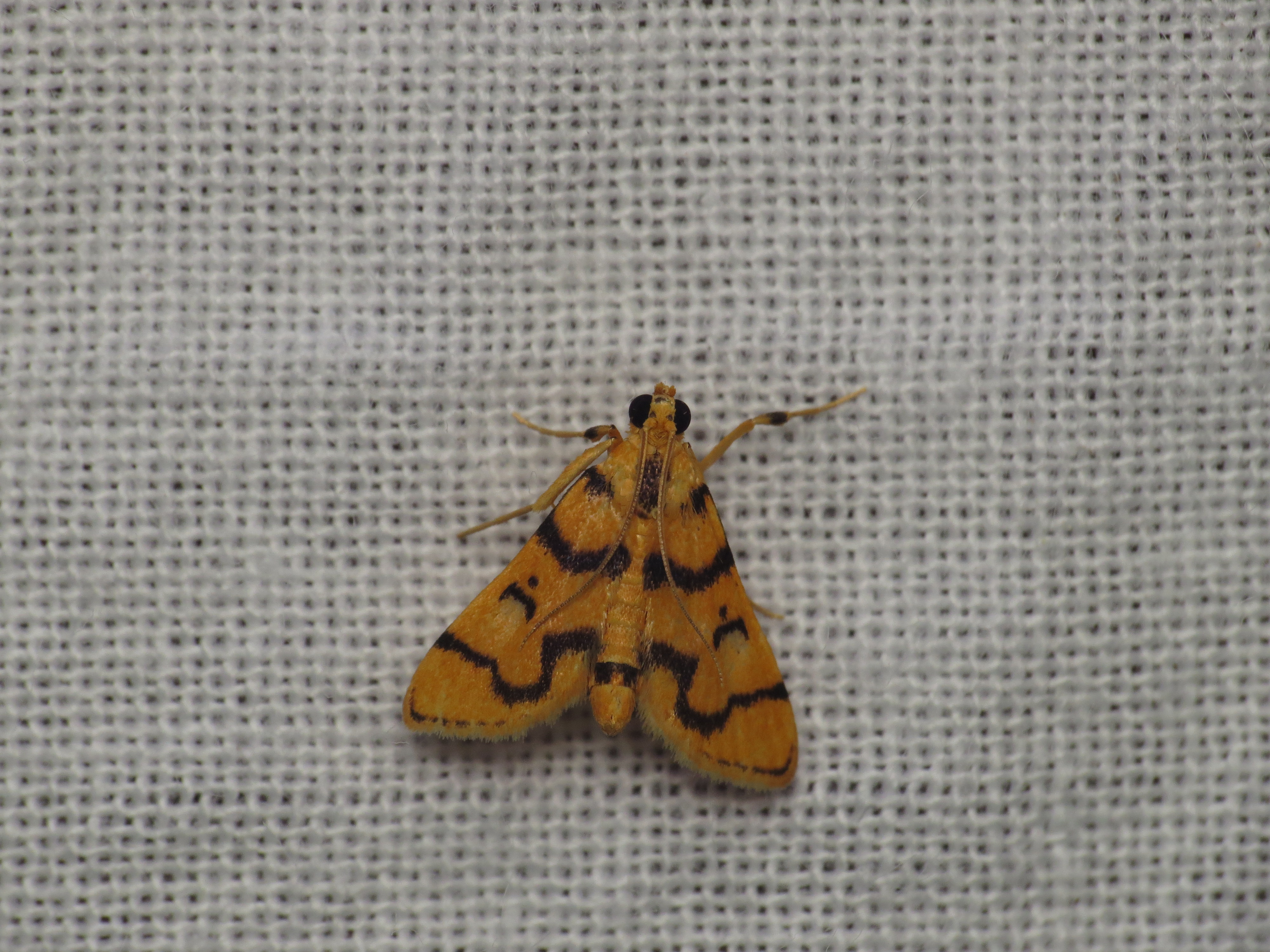
- Dichocrocis erixantha (Meyrick, 1886), to actinic light, Clump Point, Mission Beach, QLD, 25/26 November 2014

Scientific classification
- Kingdom: Animalia
- Phylum: Arthropoda
- Clade: Pancrustacea
- Class: Insecta
- Order: Lepidoptera
- Family: Crambidae
- Genus: Dichocrocis
- Species: D. erixantha

Binomial name
- Dichocrocis erixantha (Meyrick, 1886)

Synonyms
- Notarcha erixantha Meyrick, 1886

= Dichocrocis erixantha =

Species of moth

Dichocrocis erixantha is a moth in the family Crambidae. It is found on Vanuatu and in Australia.

The wingspan is about 18 mm. The forewings are deep orange-yellow with blackish markings. The hindwings are deep orange-yellow with waved blackish lines.
