= Ghesquierellana johnstoni =

Scientific classification
- Kingdom: Animalia
- Phylum: Arthropoda
- Class: Insecta
- Order: Lepidoptera
- Family: Crambidae
- Genus: Ghesquierellana
- Species: G. johnstoni

Binomial name
- Ghesquierellana johnstoni (Tams, 1941)

Synonyms
- Polygrammodes johnstoni Tams, 1941; Phalanta dioramica Ghesquière, 1942

Species of moth

Ghesquierellana johnstoni is a moth in the family Crambidae. It was described by Willie Horace Thomas Tams in 1941. It is found in the Democratic Republic of Congo and Uganda.
