= Dichocrocis tyranthes =

Scientific classification
- Kingdom: Animalia
- Phylum: Arthropoda
- Clade: Pancrustacea
- Class: Insecta
- Order: Lepidoptera
- Family: Crambidae
- Genus: Dichocrocis
- Species: D. tyranthes

Binomial name
- Dichocrocis tyranthes Meyrick, 1897

Species of moth

Dichocrocis tyranthes is a moth in the family Crambidae. It was described by Edward Meyrick in 1897. It is found on the Sangihe Islands in northern Indonesia.
