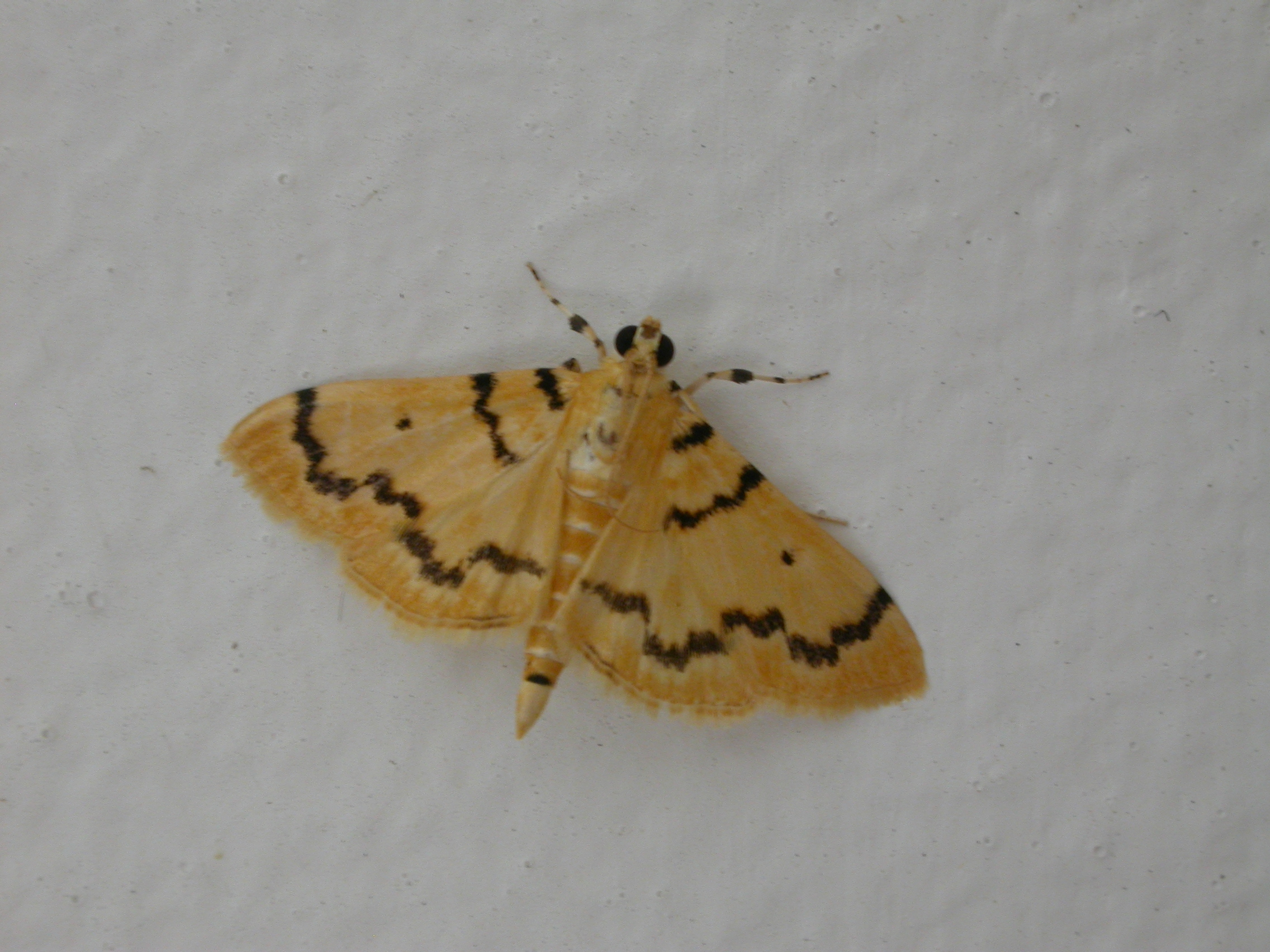

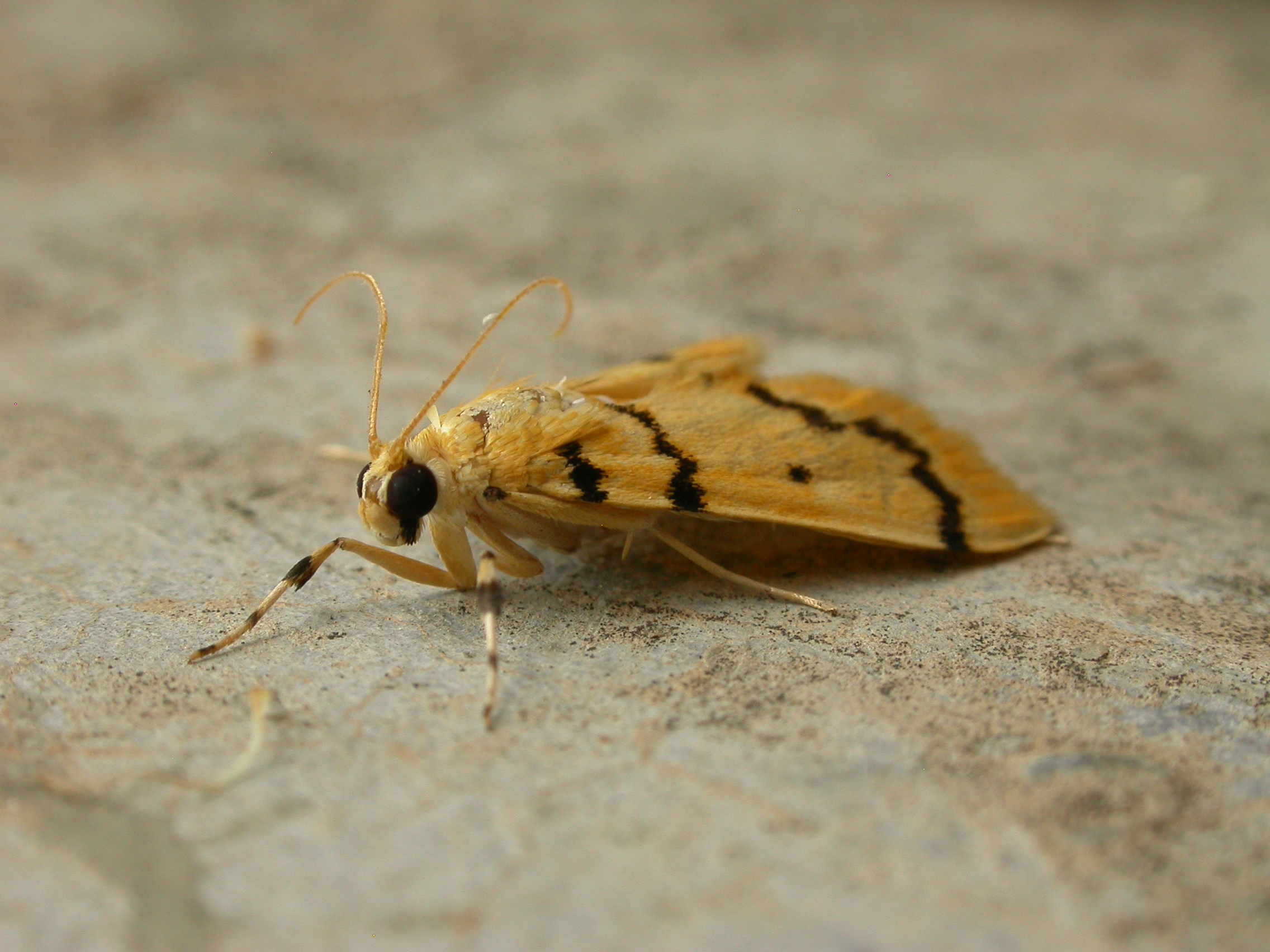

Scientific classification
- Kingdom: Animalia
- Phylum: Arthropoda
- Clade: Pancrustacea
- Class: Insecta
- Order: Lepidoptera
- Family: Crambidae
- Genus: Dichocrocis
- Species: D. clytusalis

Binomial name
- Dichocrocis clytusalis (Walker, 1859)

Synonyms
- Astura clytusalis Walker, 1859; Lygropia clytusalis

= Dichocrocis clytusalis =

Species of moth

Dichocrocis clytusalis, the kurrajong bag moth, is a species of moth of the family Crambidae. It is known from the north-eastern half of Australia.

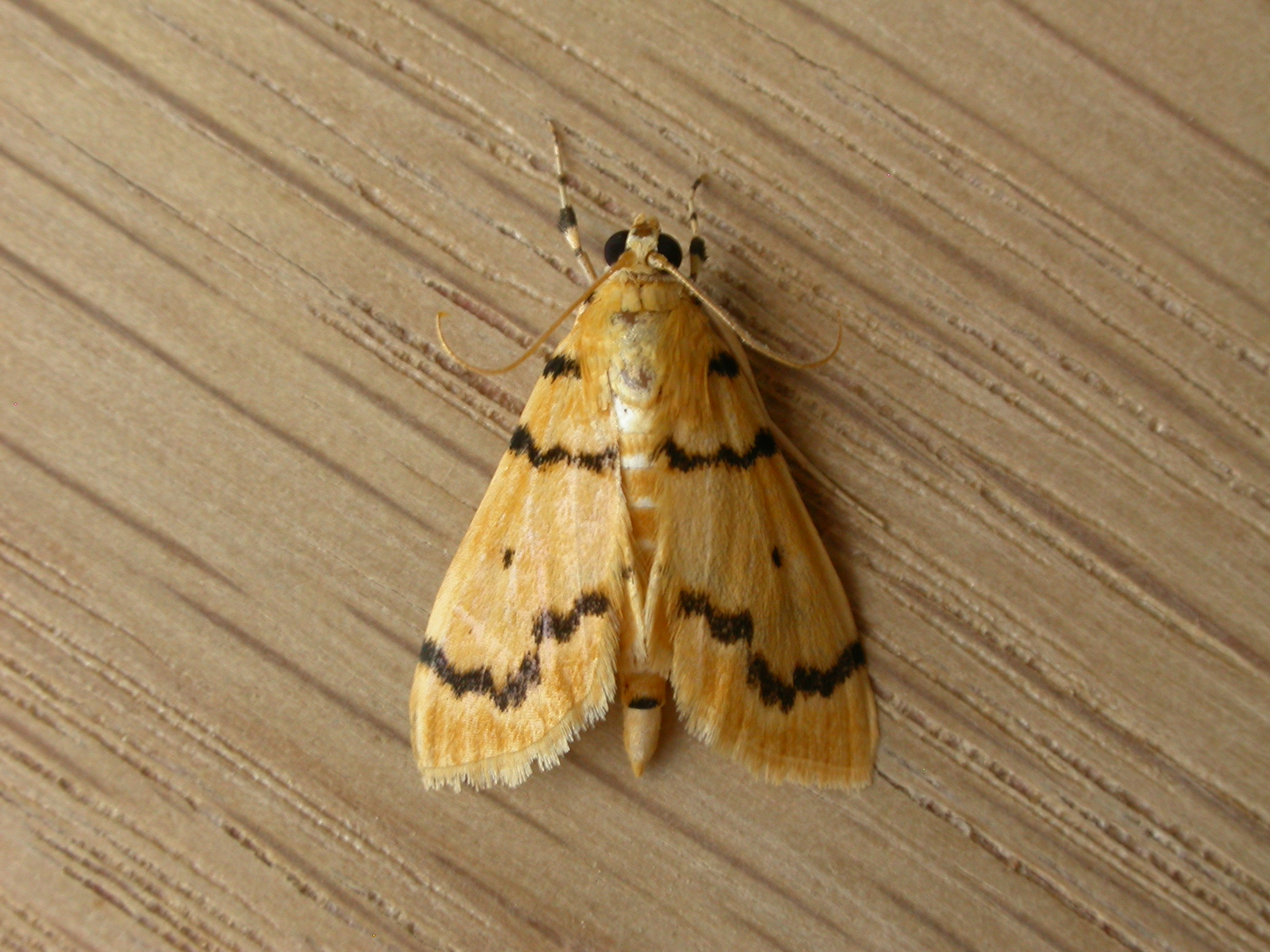

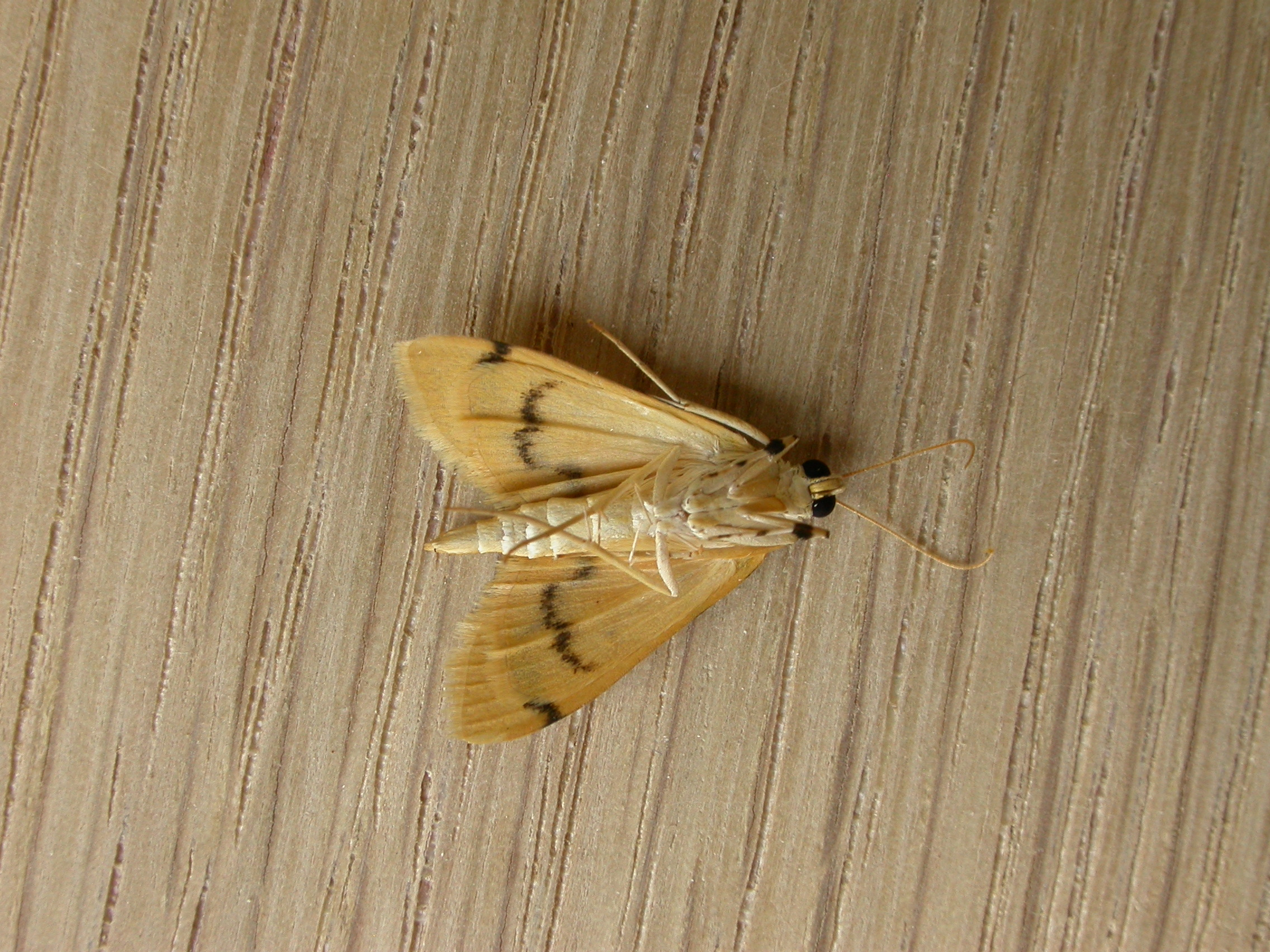

The wingspan is about 20 mm.

The larvae feed on Brachychiton rupestre, Brachychiton acerifolium and Brachychiton populneus.
