= Dichocrocis clystalis =

Scientific classification
- Kingdom: Animalia
- Phylum: Arthropoda
- Clade: Pancrustacea
- Class: Insecta
- Order: Lepidoptera
- Family: Crambidae
- Genus: Dichocrocis
- Species: D. clystalis

Binomial name
- Dichocrocis clystalis Schaus, 1920

Species of moth

Dichocrocis clystalis is a moth in the family Crambidae. It was described by Schaus in 1920. It is found in Guatemala and Honduras.
