= Dichocrocis penniger =

Scientific classification
- Kingdom: Animalia
- Phylum: Arthropoda
- Clade: Pancrustacea
- Class: Insecta
- Order: Lepidoptera
- Family: Crambidae
- Genus: Dichocrocis
- Species: D. penniger

Binomial name
- Dichocrocis penniger Dyar, 1913

Species of moth

Dichocrocis penniger is a moth in the family Crambidae. It was described by Harrison Gray Dyar Jr. in 1913 and is found in Guyana.
