= Azochis mactalis =

Scientific classification
- Kingdom: Animalia
- Phylum: Arthropoda
- Class: Insecta
- Order: Lepidoptera
- Family: Crambidae
- Genus: Azochis
- Species: A. mactalis

Binomial name
- Azochis mactalis (C. Felder, R. Felder & Rogenhofer, 1875)

Synonyms
- Botys mactalis C. Felder, R. Felder & Rogenhofer, 1875

Species of moth

Azochis mactalis is a moth in the family Crambidae. It was described by Cajetan Felder, Rudolf Felder and Alois Friedrich Rogenhofer in 1875. It is found throughout most of South America.
