= Dichocrocis bistrigalis =

Scientific classification
- Kingdom: Animalia
- Phylum: Arthropoda
- Clade: Pancrustacea
- Class: Insecta
- Order: Lepidoptera
- Family: Crambidae
- Genus: Dichocrocis
- Species: D. bistrigalis

Binomial name
- Dichocrocis bistrigalis (Walker, 1866)

Synonyms
- Zebronia bistrigalis Walker, 1866

Species of moth

Dichocrocis bistrigalis is a moth in the family Crambidae. It was described by Francis Walker in 1866. It is found in Darjeeling, India.
