= Dichocrocis xuthusalis =

Scientific classification
- Kingdom: Animalia
- Phylum: Arthropoda
- Clade: Pancrustacea
- Class: Insecta
- Order: Lepidoptera
- Family: Crambidae
- Genus: Dichocrocis
- Species: D. xuthusalis

Binomial name
- Dichocrocis xuthusalis (Walker, 1859)

Synonyms
- Botys xuthusalis Walker, 1859

Species of moth

Dichocrocis xuthusalis is a moth in the family Crambidae. It was described by Francis Walker in 1859. It is found on Borneo.
