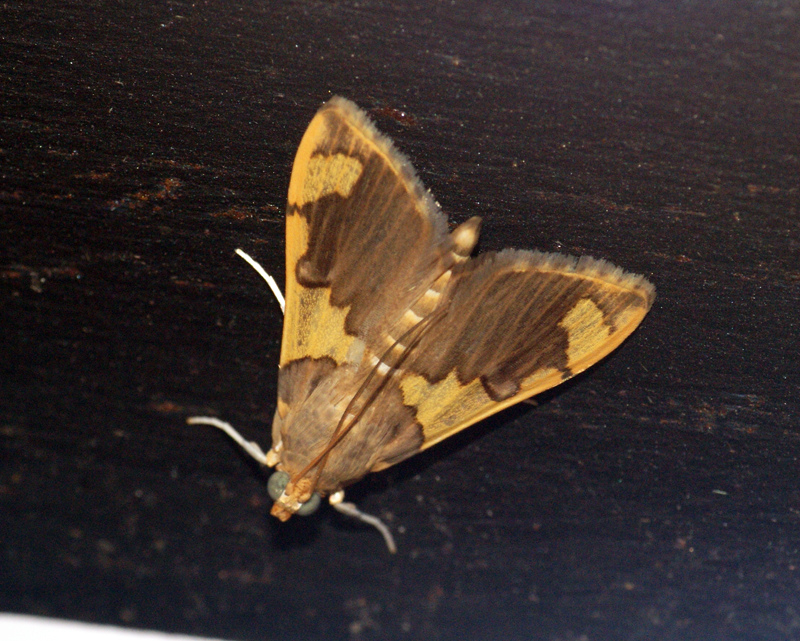

Scientific classification
- Kingdom: Animalia
- Phylum: Arthropoda
- Class: Insecta
- Order: Lepidoptera
- Family: Crambidae
- Genus: Rehimena
- Species: R. phrynealis

Binomial name
- Rehimena phrynealis (Walker, 1859)

Synonyms
- Botys phrynealis Walker, 1859; Botys haliusalis Walker, 1859

= Rehimena phrynealis =

Species of moth

Rehimena phrynealis is a moth in the family Crambidae. It was described by Francis Walker in 1859. It is found in China, Thailand, Sri Lanka, Papua New Guinea, Borneo, the Philippines, Korea, Taiwan, Fiji and Australia, where it has been recorded from the Northern Territory and Queensland.
