= Azochis ectangulalis =

Scientific classification
- Kingdom: Animalia
- Phylum: Arthropoda
- Class: Insecta
- Order: Lepidoptera
- Family: Crambidae
- Genus: Azochis
- Species: A. ectangulalis

Binomial name
- Azochis ectangulalis (Hampson, 1913)

Synonyms
- Polygrammodes ectangulalis Hampson, 1913; Azochis tallasalis Schaus, 1934

Species of moth

Azochis ectangulalis is a moth in the family Crambidae. It was described by George Hampson in 1913. It is found in Brazil.
