= Rehimena monomma =

Scientific classification
- Domain: Eukaryota
- Kingdom: Animalia
- Phylum: Arthropoda
- Class: Insecta
- Order: Lepidoptera
- Family: Crambidae
- Genus: Rehimena
- Species: R. monomma

Binomial name
- Rehimena monomma (Warren, 1896)

Synonyms
- Cyclarcha monomma Warren, 1896

Species of moth

Rehimena monomma is a moth in the family Crambidae. It was described by William Warren in 1896. It is found in the Khasi Hills of India.

The wingspan is about 20 mm. The forewings are straw yellow, suffused with greyish fuscous beneath the median vein for two thirds from the base, the veins themselves are paler. There are no markings, except for a large round velvety black discal spot. The hindwings are similar, but with the fuscous suffusion deeper and embracing the whole wing except the hind margin. There is a faint dark brown cell spot and a submarginal wavy line, edged externally with paler.
