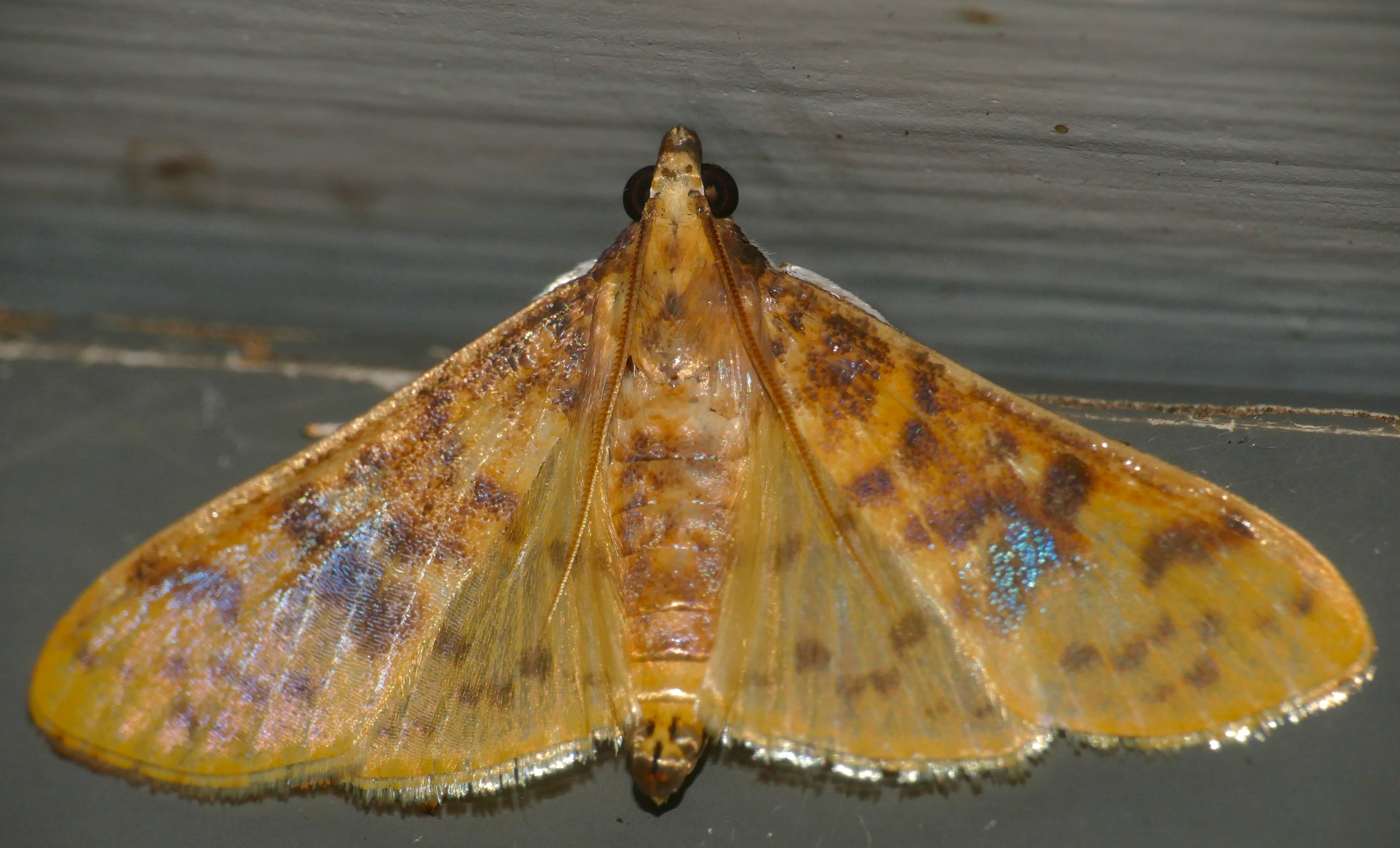

Scientific classification
- Kingdom: Animalia
- Phylum: Arthropoda
- Class: Insecta
- Order: Lepidoptera
- Family: Crambidae
- Genus: Ghesquierellana
- Species: G. hirtusalis

Binomial name
- Ghesquierellana hirtusalis (Walker, 1859)

Synonyms
- Botys hirtusalis Walker, 1859; Ghesquierellana hirsutalis Pinhey, 1975; Phostria pallas Meyrick, 1936; Polygrammodes hirtusalis borbonica Viette, 1976

= Ghesquierellana hirtusalis =

Species of moth

Ghesquierellana hirtusalis is a moth in the family Crambidae. It was described by Francis Walker in 1859. It is found on the Comoros (Mohéli) and in the Democratic Republic of the Congo (Orientale, North Kivu, Equateur), Ethiopia, Réunion, Madagascar, Sierra Leone, South Africa, Zimbabwe, and Mali.

The larvae feed on the fruits of Ficus species, including Ficus mucoso, Ficus vallis-choudae and Ficus mauritiana.
