= Dichocrocis leptalis =

Scientific classification
- Kingdom: Animalia
- Phylum: Arthropoda
- Clade: Pancrustacea
- Class: Insecta
- Order: Lepidoptera
- Family: Crambidae
- Genus: Dichocrocis
- Species: D. leptalis

Binomial name
- Dichocrocis leptalis Hampson, 1903

Species of moth

Dichocrocis leptalis is a moth in the family Crambidae. It was described by George Hampson in 1903. It is found in Himachal Pradesh, India.
