= Azochis cirrhigeralis =

Scientific classification
- Kingdom: Animalia
- Phylum: Arthropoda
- Class: Insecta
- Order: Lepidoptera
- Family: Crambidae
- Genus: Azochis
- Species: A. cirrhigeralis

Binomial name
- Azochis cirrhigeralis Dognin, 1908

Species of moth

Azochis cirrhigeralis is a moth in the family Crambidae. It was described by Paul Dognin in 1908. It is found in Peru.
