= Dichocrocis tigridalis =

Scientific classification
- Kingdom: Animalia
- Phylum: Arthropoda
- Clade: Pancrustacea
- Class: Insecta
- Order: Lepidoptera
- Family: Crambidae
- Genus: Dichocrocis
- Species: D. tigridalis

Binomial name
- Dichocrocis tigridalis Mabille, 1900

Synonyms
- Bocchoris tigridalis

Species of moth

Dichocrocis tigridalis is a moth of the family Crambidae. It can be found in Madagascar.
