= Dichocrocis megillalis =

Scientific classification
- Kingdom: Animalia
- Phylum: Arthropoda
- Clade: Pancrustacea
- Class: Insecta
- Order: Lepidoptera
- Family: Crambidae
- Genus: Dichocrocis
- Species: D. megillalis

Binomial name
- Dichocrocis megillalis (Walker, 1859)

Synonyms
- Botys megillalis Walker, 1859; Dichocrocis veisealis Swinhoe, 1906

Species of moth

Dichocrocis megillalis is a moth in the family Crambidae. It was described by Francis Walker in 1859. It is found in the Khasi Hills of India and on the island of Borneo.
