= Conogethes diminutiva =

Scientific classification
- Kingdom: Animalia
- Phylum: Arthropoda
- Class: Insecta
- Order: Lepidoptera
- Family: Crambidae
- Genus: Conogethes
- Species: C. diminutiva

Binomial name
- Conogethes diminutiva Warren, 1896

Species of moth

Conogethes diminutiva is a moth in the family Crambidae. It was described by William Warren in 1896. It is found in India and Australia.

The wingspan is about 17 mm. The forewings are yellow, the lines indicated by black spots. There is a black dot at the base and there are two subbasal spots on the inner margin. The hindwings have a discal spot and two lines of black spots, the central line forming a black blotch on the inner margin.
