= Conogethes tharsalea =

Scientific classification
- Kingdom: Animalia
- Phylum: Arthropoda
- Class: Insecta
- Order: Lepidoptera
- Family: Crambidae
- Genus: Conogethes
- Species: C. tharsalea

Binomial name
- Conogethes tharsalea (Meyrick, 1887)

Synonyms
- Notarcha tharsalea Meyrick, 1887

Species of moth

Conogethes tharsalea is a moth in the family Crambidae. It was described by Edward Meyrick in 1887. It is found in Australia, where it has been recorded from Queensland and the Northern Territory.

The wingspan is about 30 mm. Adults are pale yellow, with a pattern of black spots the wings.
