= Rehimena infundibulalis =

Scientific classification
- Kingdom: Animalia
- Phylum: Arthropoda
- Class: Insecta
- Order: Lepidoptera
- Family: Crambidae
- Genus: Rehimena
- Species: R. infundibulalis

Binomial name
- Rehimena infundibulalis (Snellen, 1880)

Synonyms
- Botys infundibulalis Snellen, 1880; Dichocrocis infundibulalis

Species of moth

Rehimena infundibulalis is a moth in the family Crambidae. It is found in Indonesia (Sumatra), Fiji and Australia, where it has been recorded from Queensland.
