= Conogethes ersealis =

Scientific classification
- Kingdom: Animalia
- Phylum: Arthropoda
- Class: Insecta
- Order: Lepidoptera
- Family: Crambidae
- Genus: Conogethes
- Species: C. ersealis

Binomial name
- Conogethes ersealis (Walker, 1859)

Synonyms
- Astura ersealis Walker, 1859

Species of moth

Conogethes ersealis is a moth in the family Crambidae. It was described by Francis Walker in 1859. It is found in Australia, where it has been recorded from Queensland.

Adults are pale yellow with black dots.
