= Azochis euvexalis =

Scientific classification
- Kingdom: Animalia
- Phylum: Arthropoda
- Class: Insecta
- Order: Lepidoptera
- Family: Crambidae
- Genus: Azochis
- Species: A. euvexalis

Binomial name
- Azochis euvexalis (Möschler, 1890)

Synonyms
- Catacteniza euvexalis Möschler, 1890

Species of moth

Azochis euvexalis is a moth in the family Crambidae. It was described by Heinrich Benno Möschler in 1890. It is found on the Virgin Islands and Puerto Rico.
