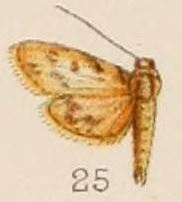

Scientific classification
- Kingdom: Animalia
- Phylum: Arthropoda
- Class: Insecta
- Order: Lepidoptera
- Family: Crambidae
- Genus: Rehimena
- Species: R. stictalis

Binomial name
- Rehimena stictalis Hampson, 1908

= Rehimena stictalis =

Species of moth

Rehimena stictalis is a species of moth of the family Crambidae described by George Hampson in 1908. It is known from Sri Lanka.

The wingspan of this species is 18 mm.
