= Dichocrocis rubritinctalis =

Scientific classification
- Kingdom: Animalia
- Phylum: Arthropoda
- Clade: Pancrustacea
- Class: Insecta
- Order: Lepidoptera
- Family: Crambidae
- Genus: Dichocrocis
- Species: D. rubritinctalis

Binomial name
- Dichocrocis rubritinctalis Hampson, 1918

Synonyms
- Proconica flavimaculalis Gaede, 1917

Species of moth

Dichocrocis rubritinctalis is a moth in the family Crambidae. It was described by George Hampson in 1918. It is found in Cameroon and Malawi.
