= Dichocrocis gyacalis =

Scientific classification
- Kingdom: Animalia
- Phylum: Arthropoda
- Clade: Pancrustacea
- Class: Insecta
- Order: Lepidoptera
- Family: Crambidae
- Genus: Dichocrocis
- Species: D. gyacalis

Binomial name
- Dichocrocis gyacalis Schaus, 1920

Species of moth

Dichocrocis gyacalis is a moth in the family Crambidae. It is found in Brazil (São Paulo).
