= Dichocrocis credulalis =

Scientific classification
- Kingdom: Animalia
- Phylum: Arthropoda
- Clade: Pancrustacea
- Class: Insecta
- Order: Lepidoptera
- Family: Crambidae
- Genus: Dichocrocis
- Species: D. credulalis

Binomial name
- Dichocrocis credulalis (Snellen, 1890)

Synonyms
- Botys credulalis Snellen, 1890

Species of moth

Dichocrocis credulalis is a moth in the family Crambidae. It was described by Snellen in 1890. It is found in India (Sikkim).
