= Rehimena straminealis =

Scientific classification
- Domain: Eukaryota
- Kingdom: Animalia
- Phylum: Arthropoda
- Class: Insecta
- Order: Lepidoptera
- Family: Crambidae
- Genus: Rehimena
- Species: R. straminealis

Binomial name
- Rehimena straminealis South in Leech & South, 1901

Species of moth

Rehimena straminealis is a moth in the family Crambidae. It was described by South in 1901. It is found in central China.

The wingspan is about 19 mm. The forewings are pale straw, rather darker on the costa. There is a black dot in the cell and a hook-shaped mark below it on the inner margin, as well as a black spot at end of the cell. The postmedial band is indicated by short black streaks on veins 1 to 7. The hindwings have black streaks on veins 2 to 7 and some black specks between veins 1 and 2, as well as a black cloud on the outer margin near the apex.
