= Dichocrocis actinialis =

Scientific classification
- Kingdom: Animalia
- Phylum: Arthropoda
- Clade: Pancrustacea
- Class: Insecta
- Order: Lepidoptera
- Family: Crambidae
- Genus: Dichocrocis
- Species: D. actinialis

Binomial name
- Dichocrocis actinialis Hampson, 1899

Species of moth

Dichocrocis actinialis is a moth in the family Crambidae. It was described by George Hampson in 1899. It is found in Meghalaya, India.
