= Dichocrocis fuscoalbalis =

Scientific classification
- Kingdom: Animalia
- Phylum: Arthropoda
- Clade: Pancrustacea
- Class: Insecta
- Order: Lepidoptera
- Family: Crambidae
- Genus: Dichocrocis
- Species: D. fuscoalbalis

Binomial name
- Dichocrocis fuscoalbalis Hampson, 1899

Synonyms
- Lygropia antithetis Meyrick, 1937

Species of moth

Dichocrocis fuscoalbalis is a moth in the family Crambidae. It was described by George Hampson in 1899. It is found in the area of the former province of Équateur in the Democratic Republic of the Congo and in Sierra Leone.

The larvae feed on Ixora coccinea.
