= Dichocrocis atrisectalis =

Scientific classification
- Kingdom: Animalia
- Phylum: Arthropoda
- Clade: Pancrustacea
- Class: Insecta
- Order: Lepidoptera
- Family: Crambidae
- Genus: Dichocrocis
- Species: D. atrisectalis

Binomial name
- Dichocrocis atrisectalis Hampson, 1908

Species of moth

Dichocrocis atrisectalis is a moth in the family Crambidae. It was described by George Hampson in 1908. It is found in the Andaman Islands in the Bay of Bengal.
