= Conogethes minimastis =

Scientific classification
- Kingdom: Animalia
- Phylum: Arthropoda
- Class: Insecta
- Order: Lepidoptera
- Family: Crambidae
- Genus: Conogethes
- Species: C. minimastis

Binomial name
- Conogethes minimastis Meyrick, 1897

Species of moth

Conogethes minimastis is a moth in the family Crambidae. It was described by Edward Meyrick in 1897. It is found in the Sangihe Islands of Indonesia.
