= Rehimena villalis =

Scientific classification
- Domain: Eukaryota
- Kingdom: Animalia
- Phylum: Arthropoda
- Class: Insecta
- Order: Lepidoptera
- Family: Crambidae
- Genus: Rehimena
- Species: R. villalis

Binomial name
- Rehimena villalis C. Swinhoe, 1906

Species of moth

Rehimena villalis is a moth in the family Crambidae. It was described by Charles Swinhoe in 1906. It is found on the Andaman Islands of the Indian Ocean.

Adults are pale yellow, the forewings with the apical half of the costal line brown. There is a moderately large black spot close to the costa beyond the middle and another slightly larger spot below it in the disc. The hindwings have an even larger black spot at the apex, and a lunular black spot in the disc, with its lower end near the outer margin. The outer marginal line is black.
