= Dichocrocis frenatalis =

Scientific classification
- Kingdom: Animalia
- Phylum: Arthropoda
- Clade: Pancrustacea
- Class: Insecta
- Order: Lepidoptera
- Family: Crambidae
- Genus: Dichocrocis
- Species: D. frenatalis

Binomial name
- Dichocrocis frenatalis Lederer, 1863

Species of moth

Dichocrocis frenatalis is a moth in the family Crambidae. It was described by Julius Lederer in 1863. It is found in India, where it has been recorded from the Nicobar Islands.
