= Dichocrocis loxophora =

Scientific classification
- Kingdom: Animalia
- Phylum: Arthropoda
- Clade: Pancrustacea
- Class: Insecta
- Order: Lepidoptera
- Family: Crambidae
- Genus: Dichocrocis
- Species: D. loxophora

Binomial name
- Dichocrocis loxophora Hampson, 1912

Species of moth

Dichocrocis loxophora is a moth in the family Crambidae. It was described by George Hampson in 1912. It is found on Bali in Indonesia.
