= Dichocrocis xanthocyma =

Scientific classification
- Kingdom: Animalia
- Phylum: Arthropoda
- Clade: Pancrustacea
- Class: Insecta
- Order: Lepidoptera
- Family: Crambidae
- Genus: Dichocrocis
- Species: D. xanthocyma

Binomial name
- Dichocrocis xanthocyma Hampson, 1898

Species of moth

Dichocrocis xanthocyma is a moth belonging to the Crambidae family. It was described by George Hampson in 1898. It is found in Papua New Guinea.
