= Conogethes semifascialis =

Scientific classification
- Kingdom: Animalia
- Phylum: Arthropoda
- Class: Insecta
- Order: Lepidoptera
- Family: Crambidae
- Genus: Conogethes
- Species: C. semifascialis

Binomial name
- Conogethes semifascialis (Walker, 1866)

Synonyms
- Astura semifascialis Walker, [1866]; Conogethes nigralis Warren, 1896; Conogethes jubata Lucas, 1900

Species of moth

Conogethes semifascialis is a moth in the family Crambidae. It was described by Francis Walker in 1866. It is found in India and Australia, where it has been recorded from New South Wales and Queensland.
