= Dichocrocis macrostidza =

Scientific classification
- Kingdom: Animalia
- Phylum: Arthropoda
- Clade: Pancrustacea
- Class: Insecta
- Order: Lepidoptera
- Family: Crambidae
- Genus: Dichocrocis
- Species: D. macrostidza

Binomial name
- Dichocrocis macrostidza Hampson, 1912

Synonyms
- Dichocrocis pulalis C. Swinhoe, 1916

Species of moth

Dichocrocis macrostidza is a species of moth of the family Crambidae. It was described by George Hampson in 1912 and it is known from Myanmar.

It is bright ochreous yellow and both wings are covered with large black spots. It has a wingspan of 30 mm.
