= Conogethes umbrosa =

Scientific classification
- Kingdom: Animalia
- Phylum: Arthropoda
- Class: Insecta
- Order: Lepidoptera
- Family: Crambidae
- Genus: Conogethes
- Species: C. umbrosa

Binomial name
- Conogethes umbrosa Meyrick, 1886

Species of moth

Conogethes umbrosa is a moth in the family Crambidae. It was described by Edward Meyrick in 1886. It is found on New Guinea.
