= Dichocrocis galmeralis =

Scientific classification
- Kingdom: Animalia
- Phylum: Arthropoda
- Clade: Pancrustacea
- Class: Insecta
- Order: Lepidoptera
- Family: Crambidae
- Genus: Dichocrocis
- Species: D. galmeralis

Binomial name
- Dichocrocis galmeralis Schaus, 1927

Species of moth

Dichocrocis galmeralis is a moth in the family Crambidae. It was described by Schaus in 1927. It is found in the Philippines (Luzon).
