= Rehimena striolalis =

Scientific classification
- Kingdom: Animalia
- Phylum: Arthropoda
- Class: Insecta
- Order: Lepidoptera
- Family: Crambidae
- Genus: Rehimena
- Species: R. striolalis

Binomial name
- Rehimena striolalis (Snellen, 1890)

Synonyms
- Filodes striolalis Snellen, 1890

Species of moth

Rehimena striolalis is a moth in the family Crambidae. It was described by Snellen in 1890. It is found in India (Sikkim).
