= Azochis patronalis =

Scientific classification
- Kingdom: Animalia
- Phylum: Arthropoda
- Class: Insecta
- Order: Lepidoptera
- Family: Crambidae
- Genus: Azochis
- Species: A. patronalis

Binomial name
- Azochis patronalis (Möschler, 1882)

Synonyms
- Botis patronalis Möschler, 1882

Species of moth

Azochis patronalis is a moth in the family Crambidae. It is found in Suriname.
