= Mabilleodes alacralis =

Scientific classification
- Domain: Eukaryota
- Kingdom: Animalia
- Phylum: Arthropoda
- Class: Insecta
- Order: Lepidoptera
- Family: Crambidae
- Genus: Mabilleodes
- Species: M. alacralis

Binomial name
- Mabilleodes alacralis Hayden, 2011

Synonyms
- Mabilleodes catalalis Marion and Viette, 1956

Species of moth

Mabilleodes alacralis is a moth in the family Crambidae. It was described by James E. Hayden in 2011. It is found in the Madagascar.
