= Ghesquierellana phialusalis =

Scientific classification
- Kingdom: Animalia
- Phylum: Arthropoda
- Class: Insecta
- Order: Lepidoptera
- Family: Crambidae
- Genus: Ghesquierellana
- Species: G. phialusalis

Binomial name
- Ghesquierellana phialusalis (Walker, 1859)

Synonyms
- Botys phialusalis Walker, 1859

Species of moth

Ghesquierellana phialusalis is a moth in the family Crambidae. It was described by Francis Walker in 1859. It is found in Sierra Leone.
