= Rehimena dichromalis =

Scientific classification
- Kingdom: Animalia
- Phylum: Arthropoda
- Class: Insecta
- Order: Lepidoptera
- Family: Crambidae
- Genus: Rehimena
- Species: R. dichromalis

Binomial name
- Rehimena dichromalis Walker, [1866]

Species of moth

Rehimena dichromalis is a moth in the family Crambidae. It was described by Francis Walker in 1866. It is found in India.
