= Orthospila orissusalis =

Scientific classification
- Kingdom: Animalia
- Phylum: Arthropoda
- Class: Insecta
- Order: Lepidoptera
- Family: Crambidae
- Genus: Orthospila
- Species: O. orissusalis

Binomial name
- Orthospila orissusalis (Walker, 1859)

Synonyms
- Botys orissusalis Walker, 1859; Botys demeter Snellen, 1890; Botys nigrilinealis Walker, 1866; Haritala tigrina Moore, 1886; Notarcha compsogramma Meyrick, 1894

Species of moth

Orthospila orissusalis is a moth in the family Crambidae. It was described by Francis Walker in 1859. It is found in Indonesia (Sulawesi, the Sula Islands, Sumbawa), India (Sikkim), Sri Lanka, Cambodia, China and Australia.
