= Dichocrocis liparalis =

Scientific classification
- Kingdom: Animalia
- Phylum: Arthropoda
- Clade: Pancrustacea
- Class: Insecta
- Order: Lepidoptera
- Family: Crambidae
- Genus: Dichocrocis
- Species: D. liparalis

Binomial name
- Dichocrocis liparalis West, 1931

Species of moth

Dichocrocis liparalis is a moth in the family Crambidae. It was described by West in 1931, and is found in the Philippines (Luzon).
