= Rehimena variegata =

Scientific classification
- Kingdom: Animalia
- Phylum: Arthropoda
- Class: Insecta
- Order: Lepidoptera
- Family: Crambidae
- Genus: Rehimena
- Species: R. variegata

Binomial name
- Rehimena variegata Inoue, 1996

Species of moth

Rehimena variegata is a moth in the family Crambidae. It was described by Hiroshi Inoue in 1996. It is found in Japan (Bonin Islands).

The larvae bore into and feed on the flower buds of Hibiscus glaber and Hibiscus tiliaceus.
