= Dichocrocis rigidalis =

Scientific classification
- Kingdom: Animalia
- Phylum: Arthropoda
- Clade: Pancrustacea
- Class: Insecta
- Order: Lepidoptera
- Family: Crambidae
- Genus: Dichocrocis
- Species: D. rigidalis

Binomial name
- Dichocrocis rigidalis (Snellen, 1890)

Synonyms
- Zebronia rigidalis Snellen, 1890; Ravanoa strigulosa Swinhoe, 1894

Species of moth

Dichocrocis rigidalis is a moth in the family Crambidae. It was described by Snellen in 1890. It is found in India (Sikkim, Meghalaya).
