= Dichocrocis punctilinealis =

Scientific classification
- Kingdom: Animalia
- Phylum: Arthropoda
- Clade: Pancrustacea
- Class: Insecta
- Order: Lepidoptera
- Family: Crambidae
- Genus: Dichocrocis
- Species: D. punctilinealis

Binomial name
- Dichocrocis punctilinealis Hampson, 1899

Species of moth

Dichocrocis punctilinealis is a moth in the family Crambidae. It was described by George Hampson in 1899. It is found in Indonesia, where it has been recorded from the Tanimbar Islands.
