= Azochis essequibalis =

Scientific classification
- Kingdom: Animalia
- Phylum: Arthropoda
- Class: Insecta
- Order: Lepidoptera
- Family: Crambidae
- Genus: Azochis
- Species: A. essequibalis

Binomial name
- Azochis essequibalis Schaus, 1924

Species of moth

Azochis essequibalis is a moth in the family Crambidae. It is found in Guyana.
