= Dichocrocis definita =

Scientific classification
- Kingdom: Animalia
- Phylum: Arthropoda
- Clade: Pancrustacea
- Class: Insecta
- Order: Lepidoptera
- Family: Crambidae
- Genus: Dichocrocis
- Species: D. definita

Binomial name
- Dichocrocis definita (Butler, 1889)

Synonyms
- Haritala definita Butler, 1889

Species of moth

Dichocrocis definita is a moth in the family Crambidae. It was described by Arthur Gardiner Butler in 1889. It is found in India (Assam).
