= Mabilleodes =

Scientific classification
- Domain: Eukaryota
- Kingdom: Animalia
- Phylum: Arthropoda
- Class: Insecta
- Order: Lepidoptera
- Family: Crambidae
- Subfamily: Odontiinae
- Genus: Mabilleodes; Marion & Viette, 1956

Genus of moths

Mabilleodes is a genus of moths of the family Crambidae.

== Species ==
- Mabilleodes alacralis Hayden, 2011
- Mabilleodes anabalis Viette, 1989
- Mabilleodes catalalis (Viette, 1953)
- Mabilleodes lithosialis (Hampson, 1899)
