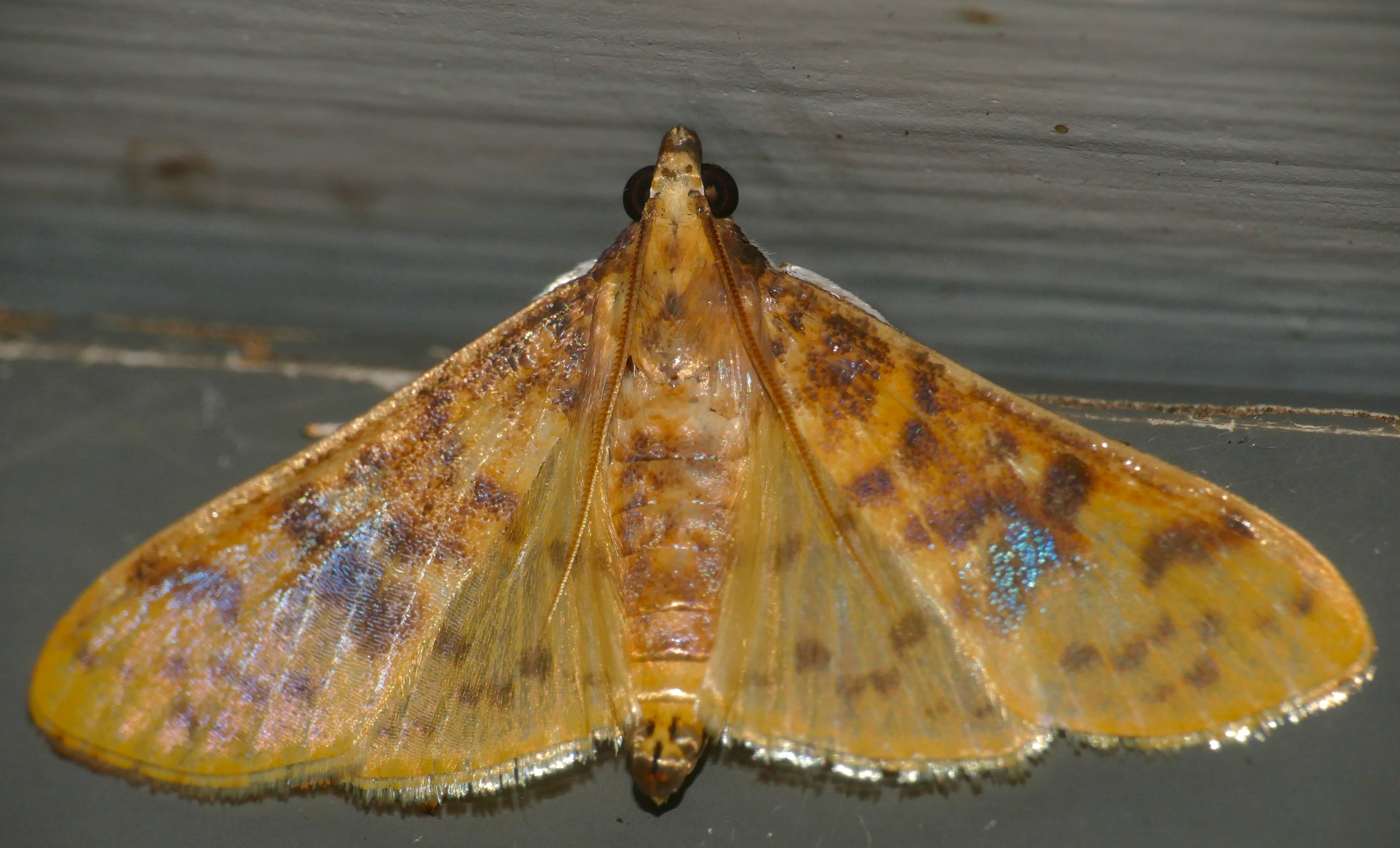
- G. hirtusalis in South Africa

Scientific classification
- Domain: Eukaryota
- Kingdom: Animalia
- Phylum: Arthropoda
- Class: Insecta
- Order: Lepidoptera
- Family: Crambidae
- Tribe: Margaroniini
- Genus: Ghesquierellana; Berger, 1955

Synonyms
- Ghesquieriellana Munroe, 1959; Phalanta Ghesquière, 1942

= Ghesquierellana =

Genus of moths

Ghesquierellana is a genus of moths of the family Crambidae.

== Species ==
- Ghesquierellana hirtusalis (Walker, 1859)
- Ghesquierellana johnstoni (Tams, 1941)
- Ghesquierellana phialusalis (Walker, 1859)
- Ghesquierellana tessellalis (Gaede, 1917)
- Ghesquierellana thaumasia Munroe, 1959
