= Orthospila plutusalis =

Scientific classification
- Kingdom: Animalia
- Phylum: Arthropoda
- Class: Insecta
- Order: Lepidoptera
- Family: Crambidae
- Genus: Orthospila
- Species: O. plutusalis

Binomial name
- Orthospila plutusalis (Walker, 1859)

Synonyms
- Zebronia plutusalis Walker, 1859; Pycnarmon discinotalis Moore, 1877

Species of moth

Orthospila plutusalis is a moth in the family Crambidae. It was described by Francis Walker in 1859. It is found in mainland India, as well as on the Andamans.
