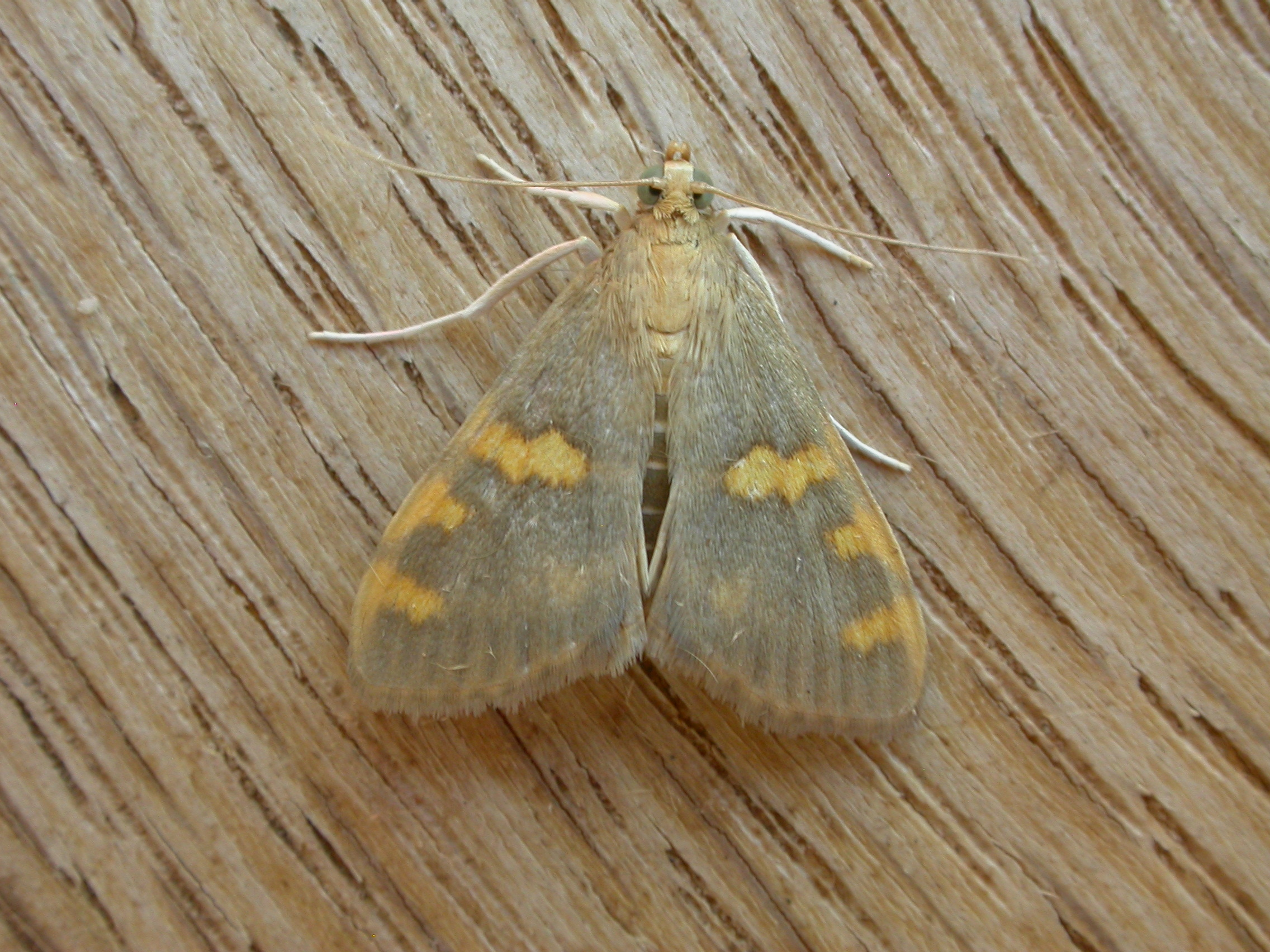

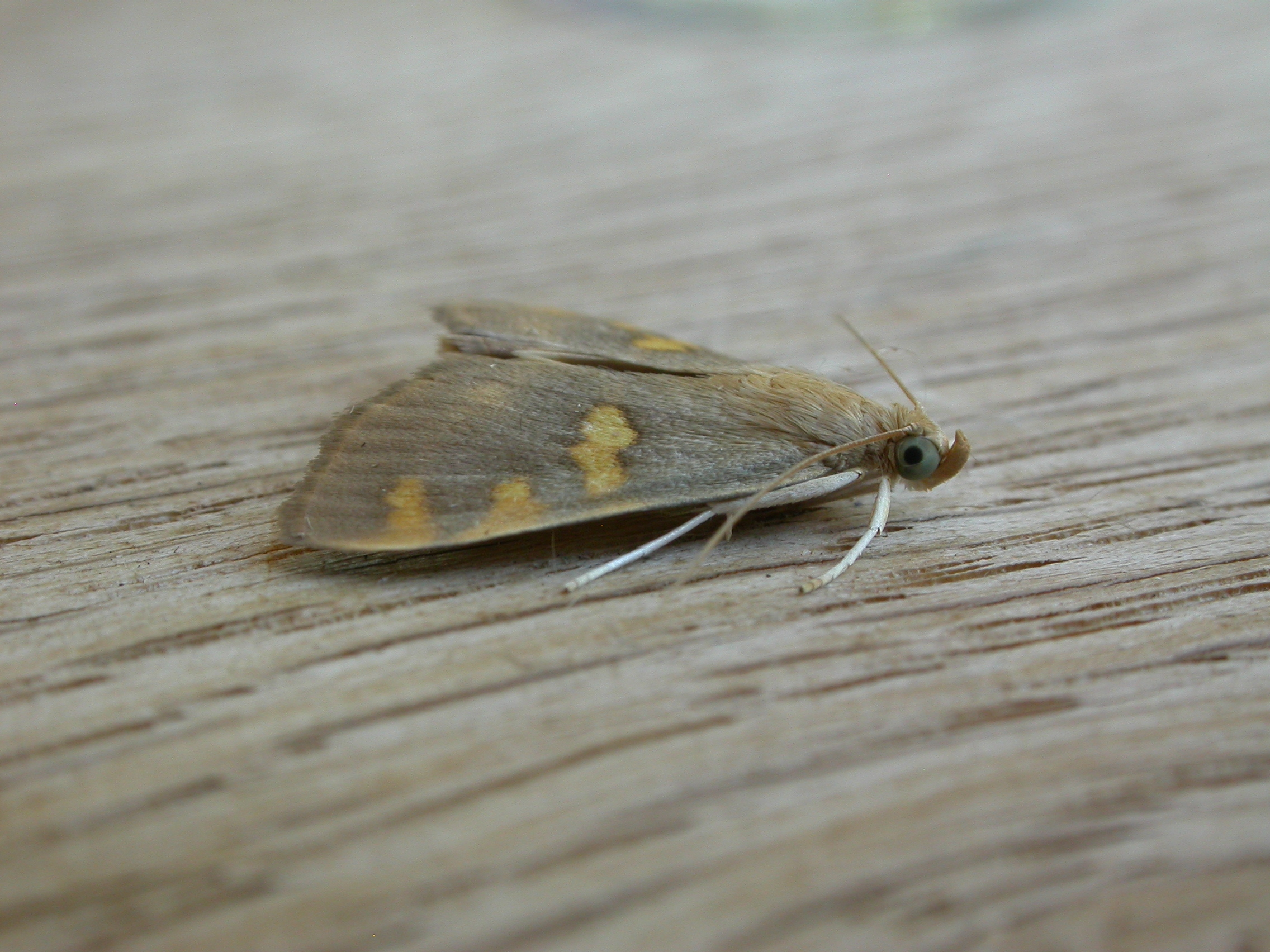

Scientific classification
- Kingdom: Animalia
- Phylum: Arthropoda
- Class: Insecta
- Order: Lepidoptera
- Family: Crambidae
- Genus: Rehimena
- Species: R. surusalis

Binomial name
- Rehimena surusalis (Walker, 1859)

Synonyms
- Botys surusalis Walker, 1859; Botys subjunctalis Walker, 1866; Botys triferalis Walker, 1866; Botys semifascialis Snellen van Vollenhoven, 1880

= Rehimena surusalis =

Species of moth

Rehimena surusalis is a species of moth of the family Crambidae described by Francis Walker in 1859. It is known from Australia (including New South Wales), China (including Hong Kong), the Andaman Islands, Sri Lanka, Indonesia, Taiwan, Korea and Japan.

The wingspan is about 16 mm.

The larvae bore in the buds of Hibiscus tiliaceus.
