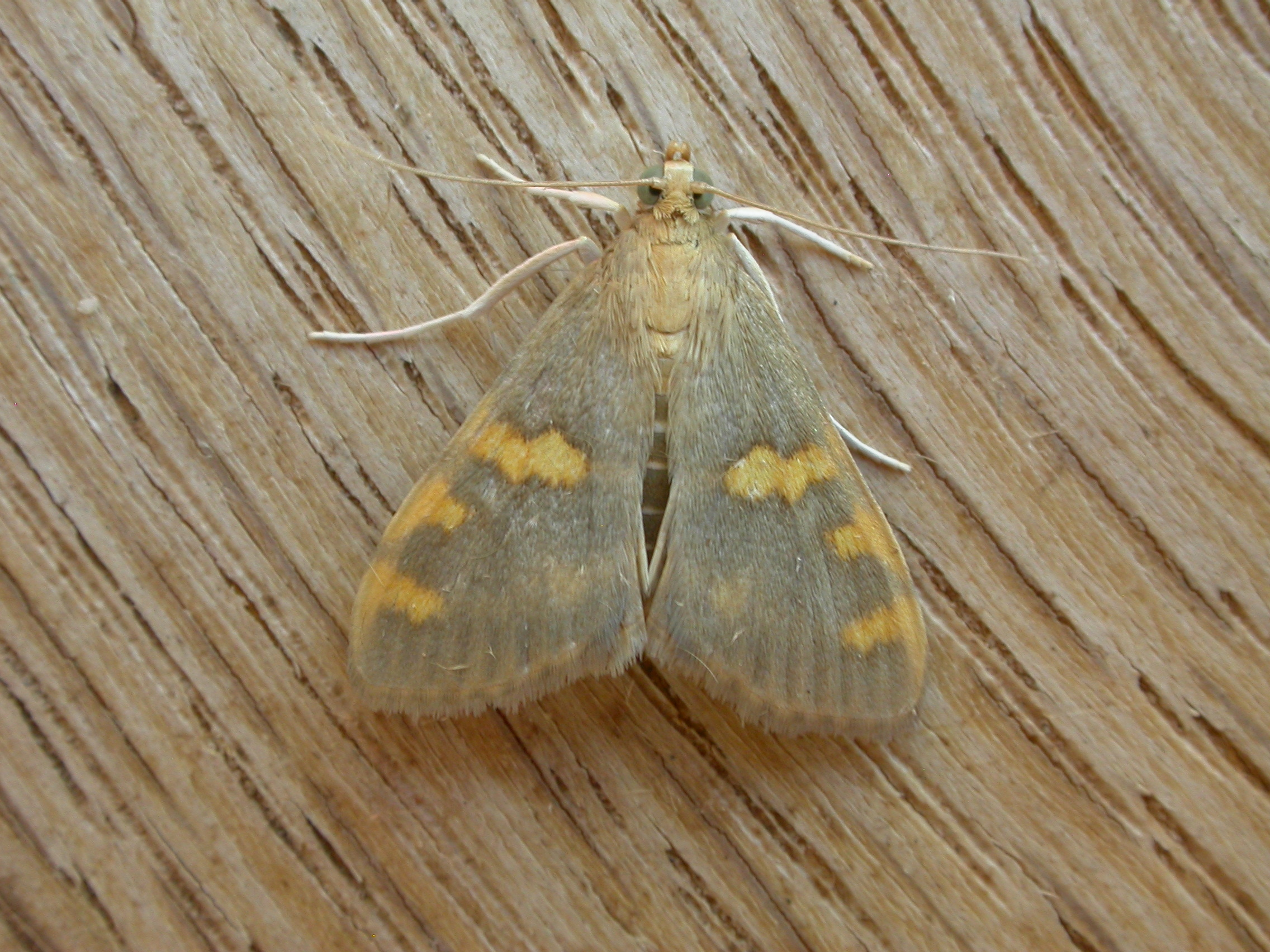
- Rehimena surusalis

Scientific classification
- Kingdom: Animalia
- Phylum: Arthropoda
- Class: Insecta
- Order: Lepidoptera
- Family: Crambidae
- Subfamily: Spilomelinae
- Genus: Rehimena; Walker, 1866

= Rehimena =

Genus of moths

Rehimena is a genus of moths of the family Crambidae described by Walker in 1866.

== Species ==
- Rehimena auritincta (Butler, 1886)
- Rehimena cissophora (Turner, 1908)
- Rehimena dichromalis Walker, [1866]
- Rehimena hypostictalis Hampson, 1908
- Rehimena infundibulalis (Snellen, 1880)
- Rehimena leptophaes (Turner, 1913)
- Rehimena monomma (Warren, 1896)
- Rehimena phrynealis (Walker, 1859)
- Rehimena reductalis Caradja, 1932
- Rehimena stictalis Hampson, 1908
- Rehimena straminealis South in Leech & South, 1901
- Rehimena striolalis (Snellen, 1890)
- Rehimena surusalis (Walker, 1859)
- Rehimena unimaculalis Hampson, 1912
- Rehimena variegata Inoue, 1996
- Rehimena villalis Swinhoe, 1906
