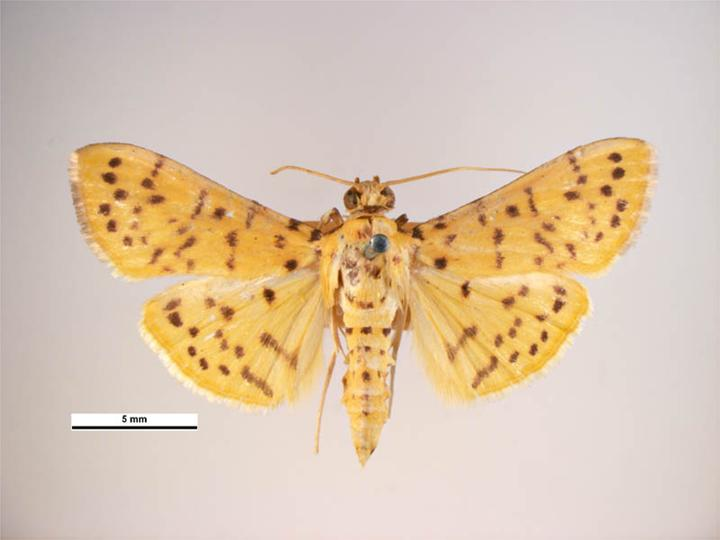
- Dorsal view
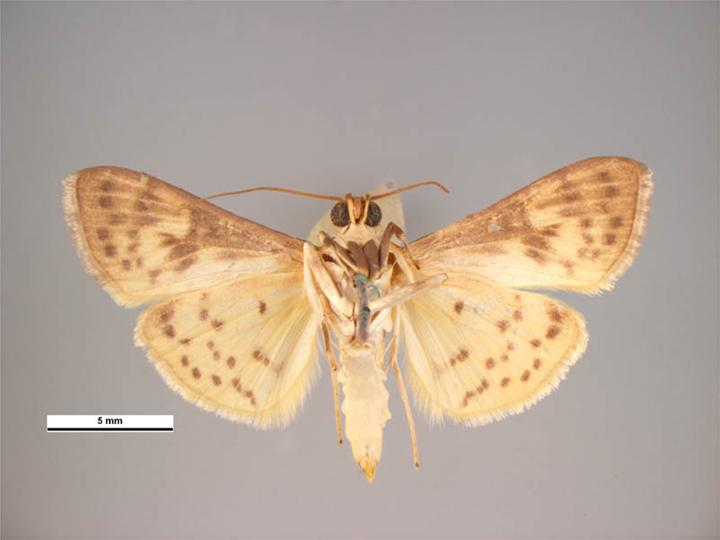
- Ventral view

Scientific classification
- Kingdom: Animalia
- Phylum: Arthropoda
- Clade: Pancrustacea
- Class: Insecta
- Order: Lepidoptera
- Family: Crambidae
- Genus: Conogethes
- Species: C. punctiferalis

Binomial name
- Conogethes punctiferalis (Guenée, 1854)

Synonyms
- Astura punctiferalis Guenée, 1854; Deiopeia detracta Walker, 1859; Botys nicippealis Walker, 1859; Astura guttatalis Walker, 1866

= Conogethes punctiferalis =

Species of moth

Conogethes punctiferalis, the durian fruit borer or yellow peach moth, is a moth of the family Crambidae.

== Description ==
Full-grown larvae are about 20 mm long. It is considered a pest on fruit trees. Adults have a wingspan of 14–20 mm. Adults are yellow with a dark pattern.

== Distribution ==
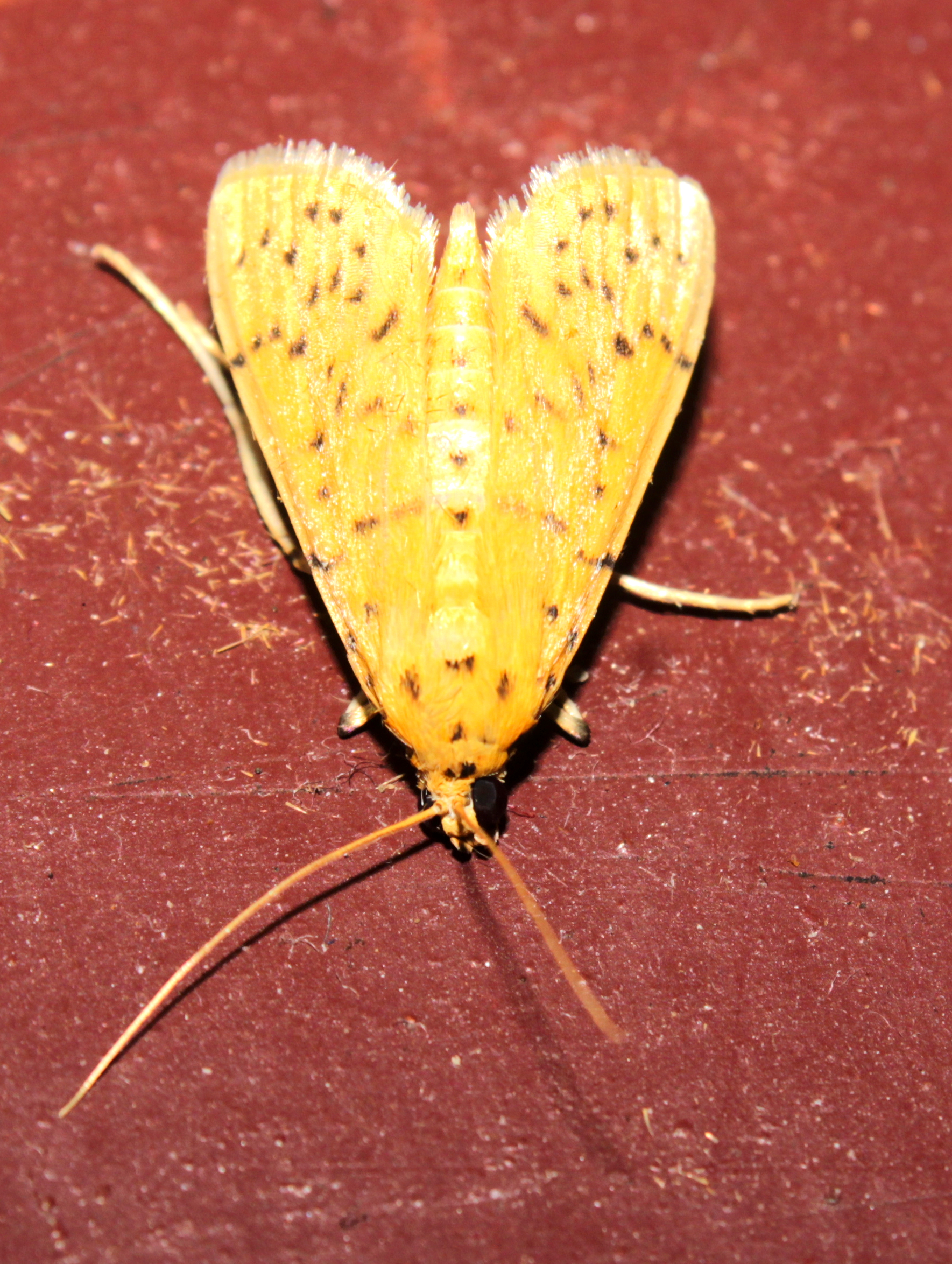
In Thrippunithura, Kerala.

It is found from India and Pakistan through south-east Asia to Australia. It has been reported from various parts of the world, mainly because larvae are imported alongside fruit. Records include Hawaii, Great Britain and the Netherlands.

== Diet ==
The larvae feed on a wide range of plants, including Zea mays, Livistona humilis, Helianthus annuus, Durio zibethinus, Carica papaya, Ricinus communis, Planchonia careya, Sorghum bicolor, Macadamia integrifolia, Prunus persica, Citrus limon, Nephelium lappaceum, Solanum melongena, Brachychiton acerifolium and Elettaria cardamomum.
