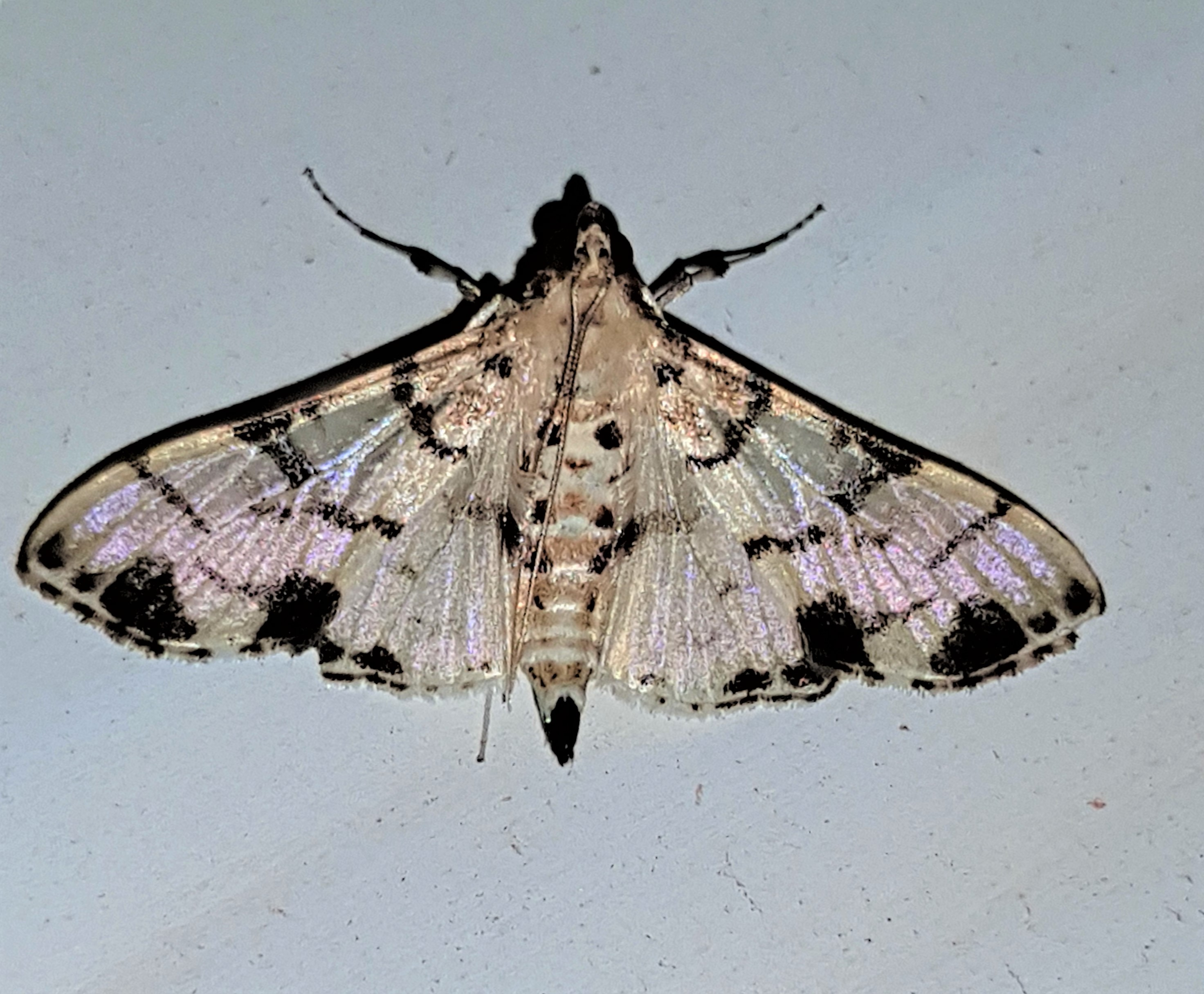

Scientific classification
- Kingdom: Animalia
- Phylum: Arthropoda
- Class: Insecta
- Order: Lepidoptera
- Family: Crambidae
- Subfamily: Spilomelinae
- Tribe: Margaroniini
- Genus: Azochis; Walker, 1859

Synonyms
- Arochis Walker, 1859; Catacteniza Möschler, 1890

= Azochis =

Genus of moths

Azochis is a genus of moths of the family Crambidae. The genus was erected by Francis Walker in 1859.

== Species ==
- Azochis camptozonalis Hampson, 1913
- Azochis cirrhigeralis Dognin, 1908
- Azochis curvilinealis Schaus, 1912
- Azochis cymographalis Hampson, 1918
- Azochis ectangulalis (Hampson, 1913)
- Azochis essequibalis Schaus, 1924
- Azochis euvexalis (Möschler, 1890)
- Azochis gripusalis Walker, 1859
- Azochis mactalis (C. Felder, R. Felder & Rogenhofer, 1875)
- Azochis oncalis Schaus, 1912
- Azochis patronalis (Möschler, 1882)
- Azochis pieralis (Walker, 1859)
- Azochis rufidiscalis Hampson, 1904
- Azochis rufifrontalis (Hampson, 1895)
- Azochis ruscialis (Druce, 1895)
- Azochis trichotarsalis Hampson, 1918
