= Dichocrocis evaxalis =

Scientific classification
- Kingdom: Animalia
- Phylum: Arthropoda
- Clade: Pancrustacea
- Class: Insecta
- Order: Lepidoptera
- Family: Crambidae
- Genus: Dichocrocis
- Species: D. evaxalis

Binomial name
- Dichocrocis evaxalis (Walker, 1859)

Synonyms
- Botys evaxalis Walker, 1859; Conogethes semistrigalis Snellen, 1895

Species of moth

Dichocrocis evaxalis is a moth in the family Crambidae. It was described by Francis Walker in 1859. It is found in India and on Sumatra and Java.
