= Mabilleodes catalalis =

Scientific classification
- Kingdom: Animalia
- Phylum: Arthropoda
- Class: Insecta
- Order: Lepidoptera
- Family: Crambidae
- Genus: Mabilleodes
- Species: M. catalalis

Binomial name
- Mabilleodes catalalis (Viette, 1953)

Synonyms
- Mecyna catalalis Viette, 1953; Autocharis catalalis (Viette, 1953); Uresiphita catalalis

Species of moth

Mabilleodes catalalis is a moth in the family Crambidae. It was described by Viette in 1953. It is found in Madagascar.

The species was previously placed in Autocharis, but was later transferred to the genus Mabilleodes.
