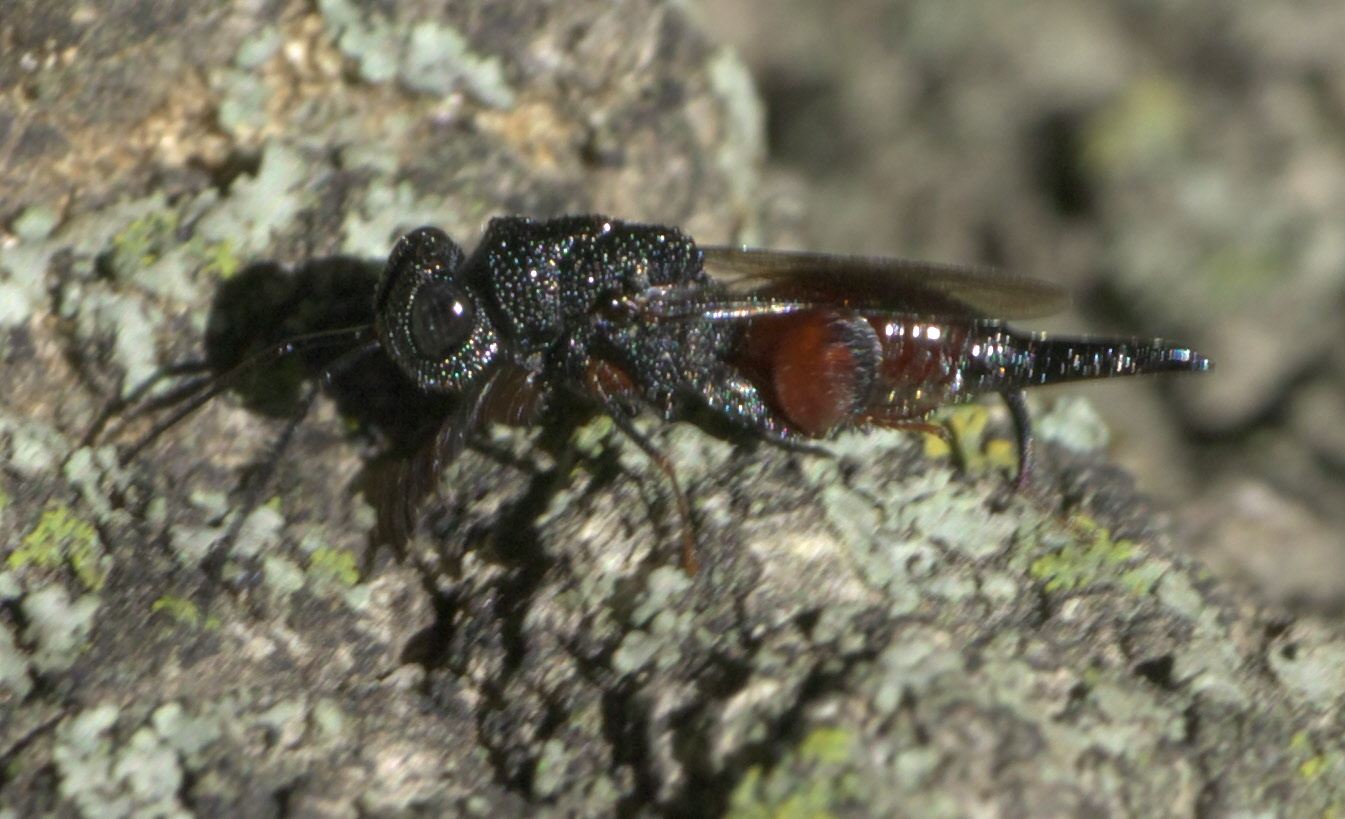
- Phasgonophora sulcata

Scientific classification
- Kingdom: Animalia
- Phylum: Arthropoda
- Class: Insecta
- Order: Hymenoptera
- Family: Chalcididae
- Subfamily: Chalcidinae
- Genus: Phasgonophora; Westwood, 1832

= Phasgonophora =

Genus of wasps

Phasgonophora is a genus of chalcidid wasps in the family Chalcididae. There are at least two described species in Phasgonophora.

== Species ==
These two species belong to the genus Phasgonophora:

- Phasgonophora rugithorax Strand, 1912^{c g}
- Phasgonophora sulcata Westwood, 1832^{c g b}

Data sources: i = ITIS, c = Catalogue of Life, g = GBIF, b = Bugguide.net
