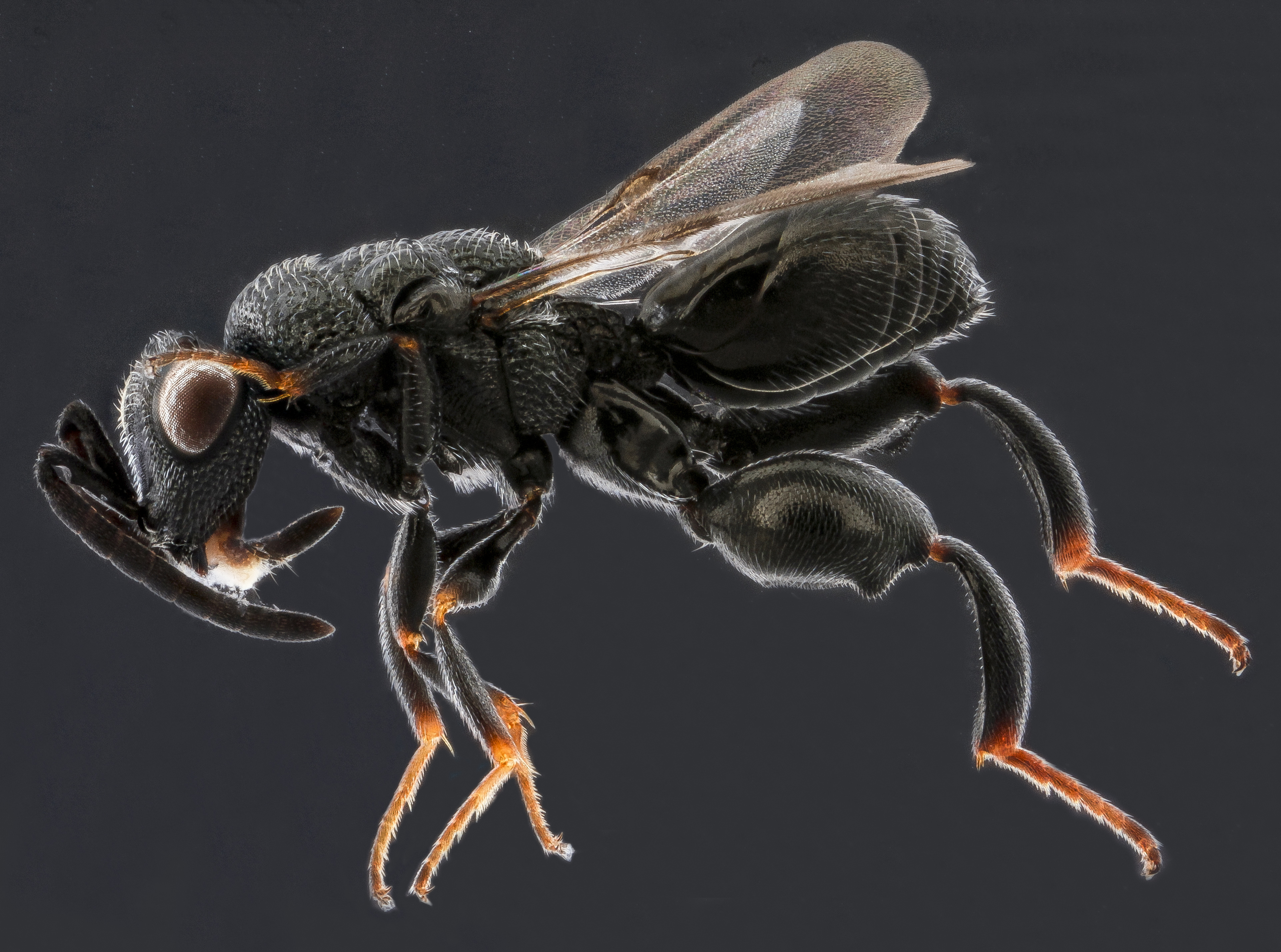

Scientific classification
- Kingdom: Animalia
- Phylum: Arthropoda
- Class: Insecta
- Order: Hymenoptera
- Family: Chalcididae
- Subfamily: Haltichellinae
- Genus: Psilochalcis; Kieffer, 1905

= Psilochalcis =

Genus of wasps

Psilochalcis is a genus of chalcidid wasps in the family Chalcididae. There are at least 20 described species in Psilochalcis.

== Species ==
These 22 species belong to the genus Psilochalcis:

- Psilochalcis benoisti (Steffan, 1948)^{c g}
- Psilochalcis brevialata Grissell & Johnson, 2001^{c g}
- Psilochalcis carinigena (Cameron, 1907)^{c g}
- Psilochalcis clypeata (Boucek, 1952)^{g}
- Psilochalcis deceptor (Grissell & Schauff, 1981)^{c g}
- Psilochalcis festiva (Steffan, 1962)^{g}
- Psilochalcis frontalis Askew, 1994^{c g}
- Psilochalcis hespenheidei (Boucek, 1984)^{c g}
- Psilochalcis immaculata (Rossi, 1792)^{c g}
- Psilochalcis keralensis Narendran, 1989^{c g}
- Psilochalcis ligustica (Masi, 1929)^{g}
- Psilochalcis longigena Kieffer, 1905^{c g}
- Psilochalcis mirabilis (Boucek, 1952)^{g}
- Psilochalcis nigerrima (Masi, 1929)^{g}
- Psilochalcis oranensis (Boucek, 1952)^{g}
- Psilochalcis rufitarsis (Illiger, 1807)^{c g}
- Psilochalcis soudanensis (Steffan, 1951)^{c g}
- Psilochalcis subaenea (Masi, 1929)^{c g}
- Psilochalcis subarmata (Forster, 1855)^{g}
- Psilochalcis tenuicornis Askew, 2001^{c g}
- Psilochalcis threa (Grissell & Schauff, 1981)^{c g}
- Psilochalcis usta (Grissell & Schauff, 1981)^{c g}

Data sources: i = ITIS, c = Catalogue of Life, g = GBIF, b = Bugguide.net
