= Cratocentrus =

Scientific classification
- Kingdom: Animalia
- Phylum: Arthropoda
- Class: Insecta
- Order: Hymenoptera
- Family: Chalcididae
- Subfamily: Cratocentrinae
- Genus: Cratocentrus; Cameron, 1907

Species
- See text

Synonyms
- Cerachalcis (Masi, 1944)

Genus of wasps

Cratocentrus is a genus of wasps in the family Chalcididae. Species are found in Asia and Africa.

== Species ==
- Cratocentrus argenteopilosus, synonym of Cratocentrus ruficornis
- Cratocentrus auropilosus, synonym of Cratocentrus ruficornis
- Cratocentrus bicornutus, synonym of Cratocentrus ruficornis
- Cratocentrus birmanus (Masi, 1944)
- Cratocentrus decoratus (Klug, 1834)
- Cratocentrus fastuosus (Masi, 1944)
- Cratocentrus maculicollis (Masi, 1944)
- Cratocentrus pruinosus (Steffan, 1959)
- Cratocentrus ruficornis (Cameron, 1907)
- Cratocentrus tomentosus (Nikolskaya, 1952)
