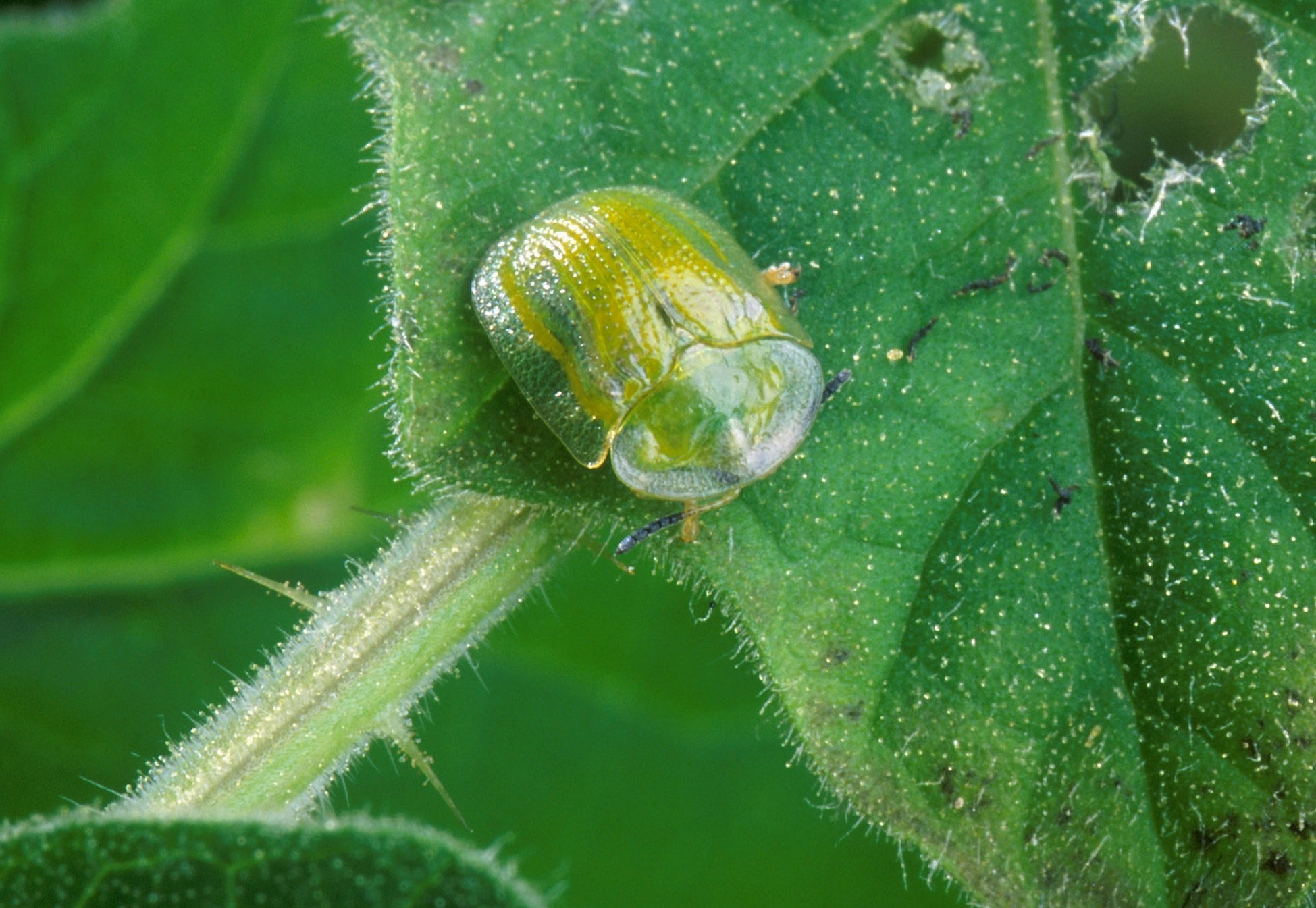

Scientific classification
- Kingdom: Animalia
- Phylum: Arthropoda
- Clade: Pancrustacea
- Class: Insecta
- Order: Coleoptera
- Suborder: Polyphaga
- Infraorder: Cucujiformia
- Family: Chrysomelidae
- Genus: Gratiana
- Species: G. boliviana

Binomial name
- Gratiana boliviana Spaeth, 1926

= Gratiana boliviana =

Species of beetle

Gratiana boliviana is a species of beetle in the leaf beetle family, Chrysomelidae. Its common name is tropical soda apple leaf beetle. It is native to South America, where its distribution includes Argentina, Brazil, and Paraguay. It specializes on tropical soda apple (Solanum viarum), an invasive plant species. It has been released as an agent of biological pest control against the weedy plant in Florida and other parts of the United States.

== Description and life cycle ==
The adult beetle is about 6 millimetres (0.24 in) long and 4 to 5 millimetres (0.16 to 0.20 in) wide. The young adult is green in color and turns yellow as it ages. It is pale brown during its overwintering stage, when it enters diapause. The ventral abdomen is somewhat transparent, and during its reproductive season the internal sex organs become visible: white oviducts in the female and orange testes in the male.

The larva is light green and covered in spines. Older larvae usually carry fecal shields. The pupa is flattened and pale green in color. It rests attached to the underside of a leaf.

In Florida, diapause occurs in December through March, during which time the adult is dormant and hidden in leaf litter. Starting in March or April, the adults come out to feed and mate. Seven to eight generations occur during the year. The female lays single eggs on the leaves of the tropical soda apple plant. A female can produce about 300 eggs. Each egg is between 1 and 2 millimetres (0.039 and 0.079 in) long including its wide, transparent, papery casing. The larva emerges in 5 to 6 days, feeds voraciously, progresses through five instars, and becomes a pupa after 16 to 18 days. Pupation lasts about a week. The female beetle lives 3 to 4 months.

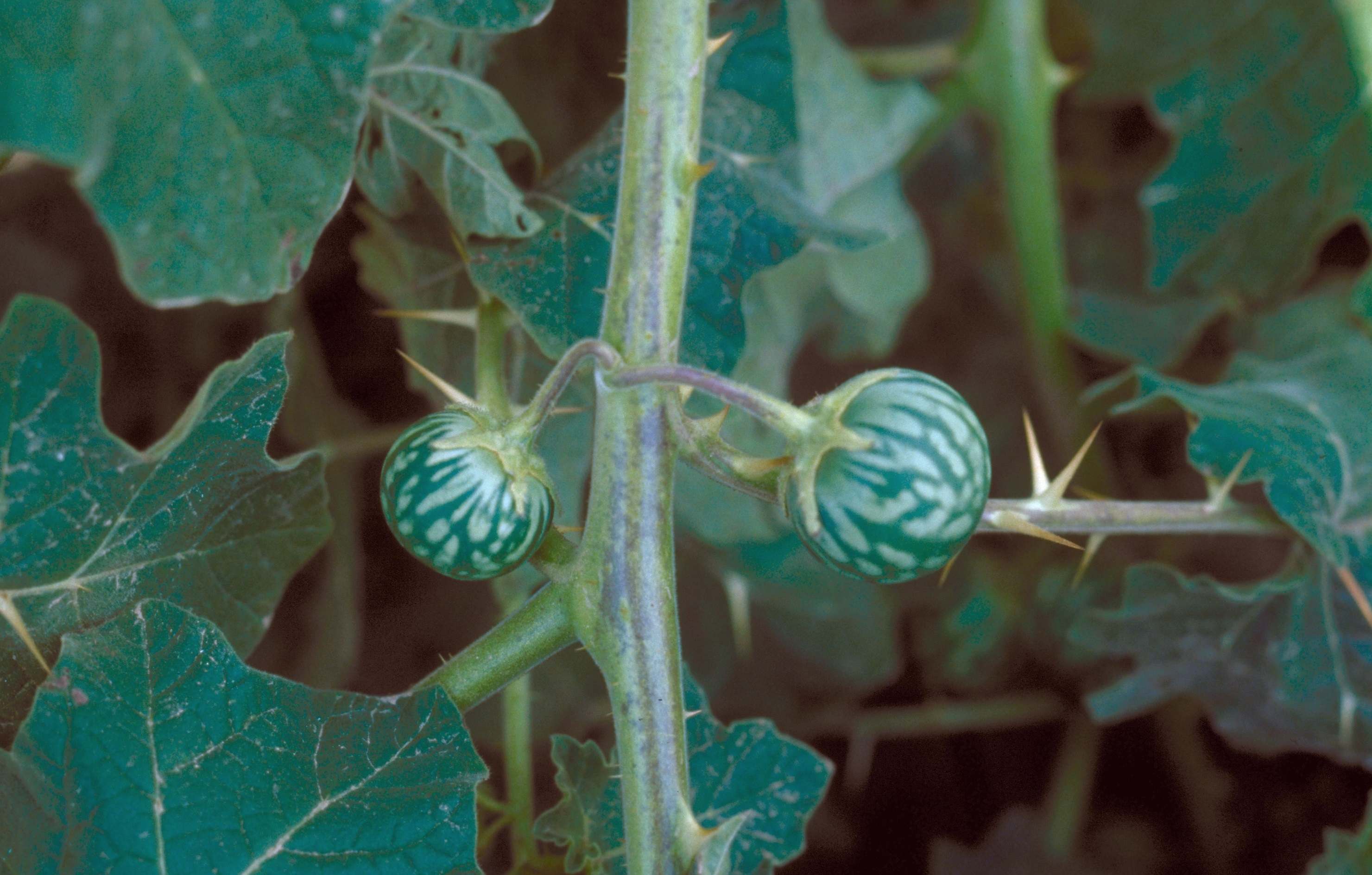
tropical soda apple

== Host interaction ==
The main host plant of the beetle is the tropical soda apple (Solanum viarum), a prickly shrub in the nightshade family. Like the beetle, it is native to South America. It was first discovered in the United States in 1988 in Florida. It has since spread as far north as Pennsylvania and as far west as Arizona. As of 2011, over one million acres are infested in the United States. The tropical soda apple has been nicknamed "the plant from hell".

The plant is a noxious weed producing large, dense, prickly thickets that outcompete native plants and disturb wildlife habitat. It reduces the cattle carrying capacity of pasture land, costing ranchers millions of dollars in Florida alone. It is an alternate host for several viruses of crop plants, including cucumber mosaic virus, potato leafroll virus, potato virus Y, tobacco etch virus, and tomato mosaic virus. It hosts pest insects such as the silverleaf whitefly, Colorado potato beetle, tomato hornworm, tobacco hornworm, and southern green stinkbug.

The beetle is host-specific. Studies have shown that it can only complete its life cycle on tropical soda apple. When offered over 120 other species of plants, the beetle fed lightly on only one of them and barely sampled three others, all Solanum species. It rarely laid eggs on any other plants, either. Eggplant, a Solanum crop, is not attacked by the beetle in its home range. Larvae always die when limited to native US Solanum species. The only other known natural host is the South American plant Solanum palinacanthum. Its host specificity made the beetle a relatively safe choice for introduction.

The larva of the beetle feeds on the upper third of the plant, damaging its leaves. The adult also feeds on the foliage. Feeding damage takes the form of holes in the leaves. The injury facilitates the entry of pathogens and causes stress to the plant, reducing its growth and fruit production. Larvae kept free of natural enemies can almost completely defoliate a plant.

The beetle was released in Florida in 2003. As of 2010 it had become established in many areas there, and stands of tropical soda apple in these areas have been well defoliated, lower in fruit yield, thinned and replaced by other plants. No beetle damage has been noted on any other plant species. This tropical beetle cannot develop where cold temperatures occur, so its establishment farther north will be limited.

== Ecology ==
Many natural enemies of the beetle have been noted in Florida, including predators and parasitoids. Predators include the bug Geocoris punctipes, an assassin bug of genus Sinea, the shield bugs Perillus bioculatus and Stiretrus anchorago, the mirid bug Tupiocoris notatus, the red imported fire ant (Solenopsis invicta), and the green lynx spider (Peucetia viridans).

A number of parasitoid wasps attack the pupae, including Conura side, Aprostocetus cassidis, and Brasema sp.

Pathogens that can affect the beetle include the parasitic neogregarine protozoan Mattesia oryzaephili and a microsporidian of the genus Nosema.
