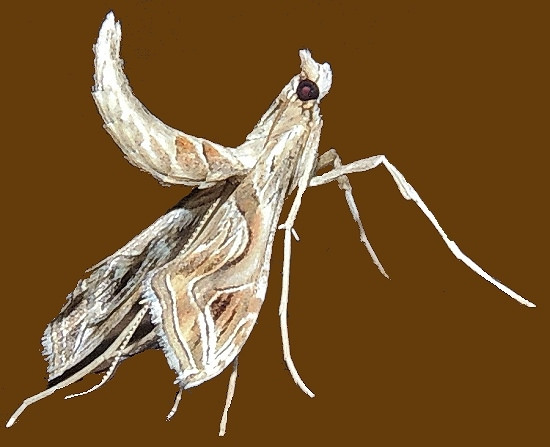

Scientific classification
- Kingdom: Animalia
- Phylum: Arthropoda
- Clade: Pancrustacea
- Class: Insecta
- Order: Lepidoptera
- Family: Crambidae
- Genus: Lineodes
- Species: L. integra

Binomial name
- Lineodes integra (Zeller, 1873)

Synonyms
- Scoptonoma integra Zeller, 1873

= Lineodes integra =

Species of moth

Lineodes integra, the eggplant leafroller moth or nightshade leaftier, is a moth of the family Crambidae. It is found from the southern United States (from Florida to California), south to Chile. It has also been recorded from Illinois, Michigan, Ontario and Cuba.

The wingspan is about 18 mm.

The larvae feed on Solanaceae species, including Solanum melongena, Physalis species, Capsicum species, Solanum viarum and Solanum lycopersicum.
