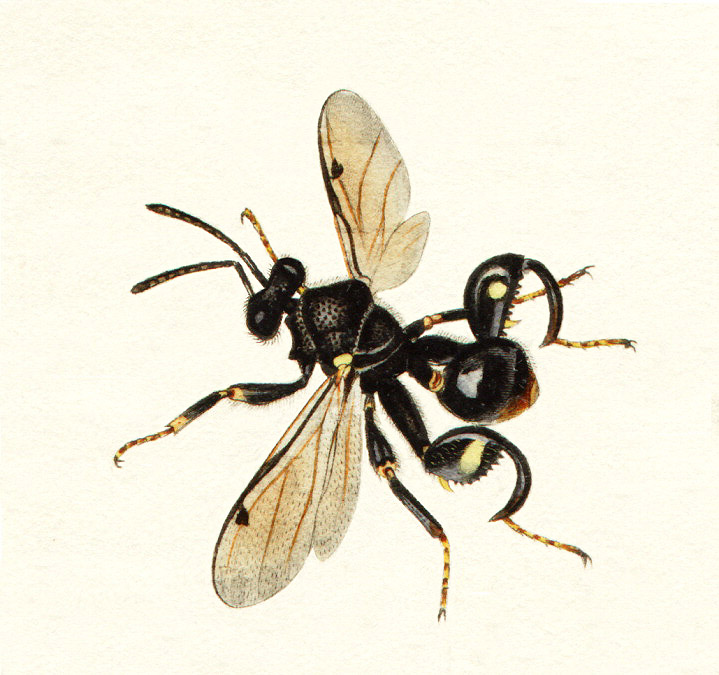
- Chalcis biguttata Spinola, 1808.

Scientific classification
- Domain: Eukaryota
- Kingdom: Animalia
- Phylum: Arthropoda
- Class: Insecta
- Order: Hymenoptera
- Superfamily: Chalcidoidea
- Family: Chalcididae
- Subfamily: Chalcidinae
- Genus: Chalcis; Fabricius, 1787

Type species
- Chalcis sispes (Linnaeus, 1761)

Species
- See text

= Chalcis (wasp) =

Genus of wasps

Chalcis is a wasp genus in the subfamily Chalcidinae.

== Species ==
According to waspweb.org, there are 19 species in the Afrotropics :

- Chalcis amphilochus Walker, 1846 (Sierra Leone)
- Chalcis bicolor Bingham, 1902 (Zimbabwe)
- Chalcis capensis Cameron, 1905 (South Africa)
- Chalcis ferox Kieffer, 1905 (Madagascar)
- Chalcis flavitarsis Kieffer, 1905 (Madagascar)
- Chalcis fuscus Schmitz, 1946 (Democratic Republic of Congo)
- Chalcis melanogastra Cameron, 1907 (South Africa)
- Chalcis melanospila Cameron, 1907 (South Africa)
- Chalcis microlinea Walker, 1862 (South Africa)
- Chalcis natalensis Cameron, 1907 (South Africa)
- Chalcis polyctor Walker, 1841 (South Africa)
- Chalcis pymi Cameron, 1905 (South Africa)
- Chalcis resus Walker, 1850 (Sierra Leone)
- Chalcis rotundata Cameron, 1905 (South Africa)
- Chalcis saussurei Kieffer, 1905 (Madagascar)
- Chalcis spilopus Cameron, 1905 (South Africa)
- Chalcis transvaalensis Cameron, 1911 (South Africa)
- Chalcis vera Boucek, 1974 (Namibia, South Africa)
- Chalcis visellus Walker, 1846 (Sierra Leone)
