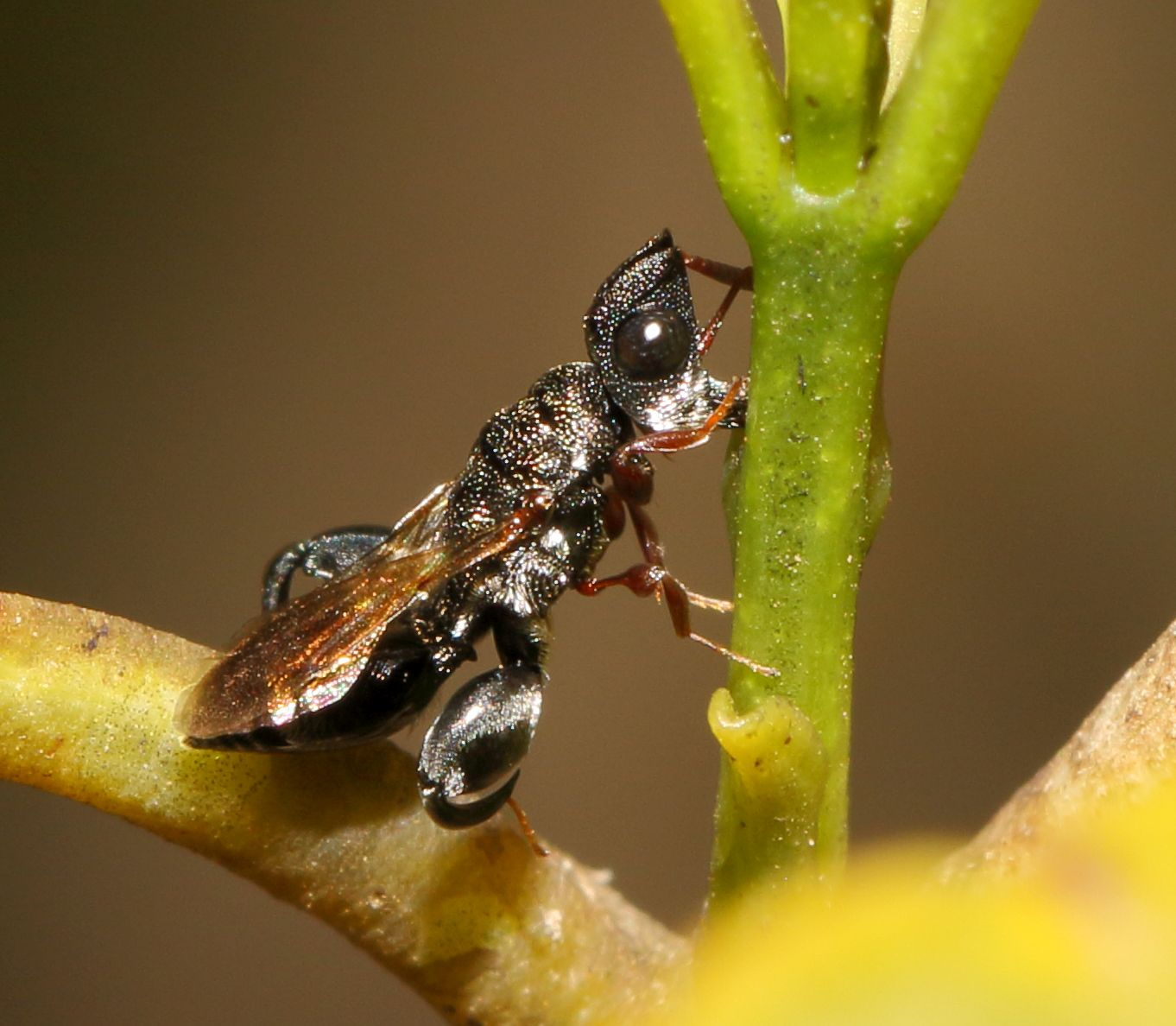
- Dirhinus sp. adult

Scientific classification
- Kingdom: Animalia
- Phylum: Arthropoda
- Class: Insecta
- Order: Hymenoptera
- Family: Chalcididae
- Subfamily: Dirhininae
- Genus: Dirhinus; Dalman, 1818

= Dirhinus =

Genus of wasps

Dirhinus is a genus of parasitic wasps in the family Chalcididae. The genus has a worldwide distribution.

These chalcids are parasitoids of flies; most of the host species are flies that develop in vertebrate corpses, and many are associated with humans (Calliphoridae, Sarcophagidae and Muscidae). Flies from the Tephritidae and Glossinidae are also parasitized.

Female Dirhinus wasps target the host flies while they pupate in the soil (after the larval stage is complete); the wasp reaches the pupa by digging in the soil with her horns and an egg is laid on the body of the fly pupa, within its puparium.

== Species ==
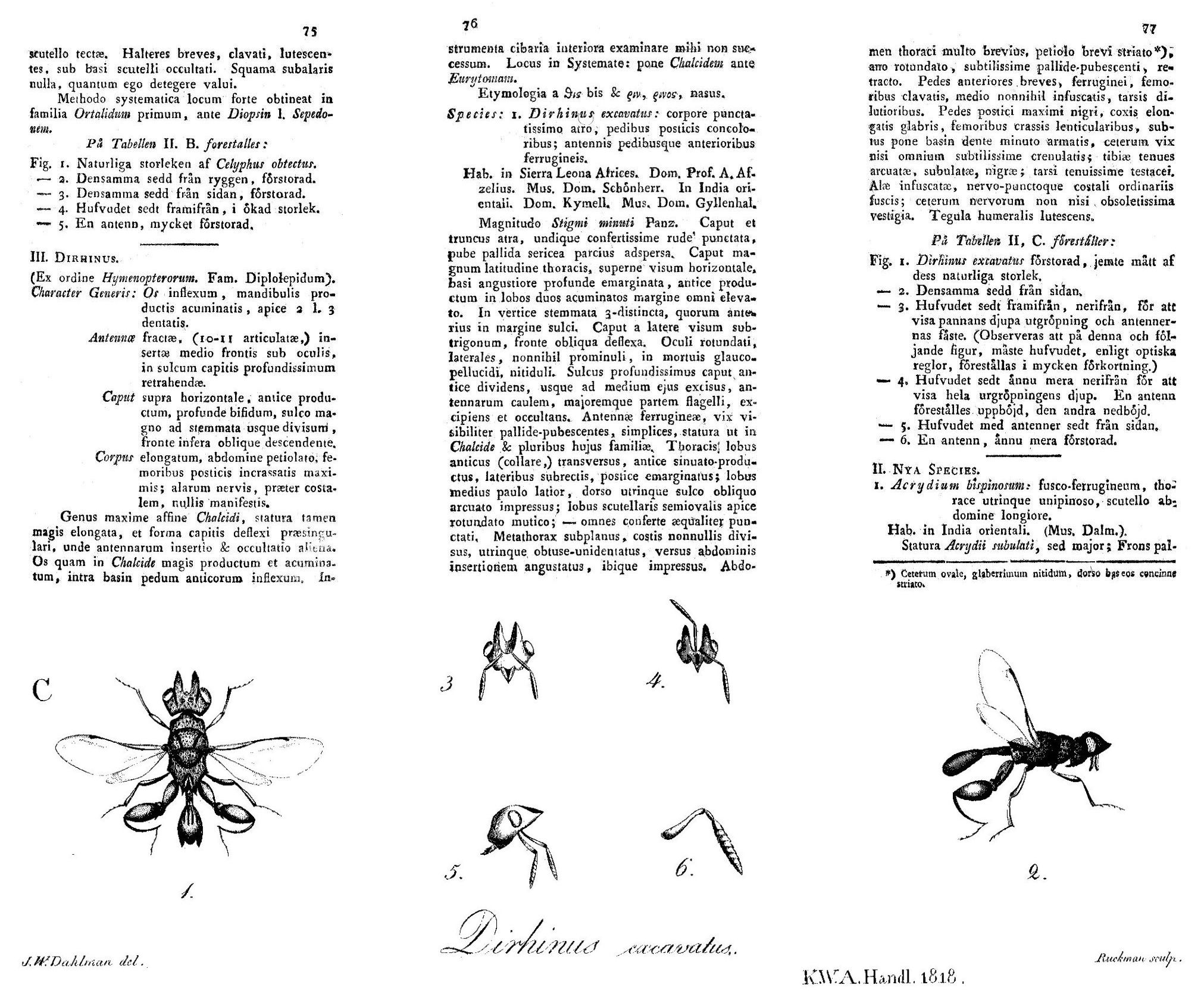
The original description of the genus Dirhinus and of Dirhinus excavatus by J.W. Dalman (1818)

There are about 70 described species:

- D. acutus (Schmitz)
- D. alticornis (Masi)
- D. altispina Bouček and Narendran
- D. anthracia Walker
- D. antonii Schmitz
- D. asirensis Gul, Soliman and Gadallah
- D. atricornis (Girault)
- D. auratus Ashmead
- D. bakeri (Crawford)
- D. banksi Rohwer
- D. browni (Crawford)
- D. buscki (Crawford)
- D. caelebs Masi
- D. caerulea (Cameron)
- D. caeruleiceps (Cameron)
- D. cameroni (Ashmead)
- D. clavatus Husain and Agarwal
- D. claviger Bouček and Narendran
- D. cornuta (Strand)
- D. cyclocerus Schmitz
- D. cyprius Masi
- D. deplanatus Bouček and Narendran
- D. dives Masi
- D. ehrhorni Silvestri
- D. emersoni (Girault)
- D. excavatus Dalman
- D. flavicornis Schmitz
- D. galesusaeformis (Risbec)
- D. garouae Risbec
- D. giffardii Silvestri
- D. gigasetosus Delvare
- D. gussakovskii Nikolskaya
- D. hesperidum (Rossi)
- D. himalayanus Westwood
- D. inflexus Waterston
- D. kambae Delvare
- D. kirbyi (Ashmead)
- D. kivuensis (Schmitz)
- D. leakeyorum Delvare
- D. linearis (Masi)
- D. loriae (Masi)
- D. maasaii Delvare
- D. maculatus (Girault)
- D. madagascariensis (Masi)
- D. magnificus (Crawford)
- D. mauritianus Westwood
- D. minimus (Schmitz)
- D. neoclaviger Narendran and Achterberg
- D. neotropicus Strand
- D. nidicolus Kerrich
- D. parotideus Masi
- D. perideus Burks
- D. pilifer Boucek and Narendran
- D. pusillus Masi
- D. quadrhinus Delvare
- D. reticulatus Cameron
- D. rossettoi De Santis
- D. ruficornis (Cameron)
- D. salinae Narendran
- D. schwarzi (Crawford)
- D. sculpturatus Gul, Soliman and Gadallah
- D. secundarius Masi
- D. sinon Fernando
- D. sureshani Narendran
- D. texanus (Ashmead)
- D. transversus Gul, Soliman and Gadallah
- D. ugandensis (Masi)
- D. variocelli Girault
- D. vultur (Girault)
- D. wohlfahrtiae Ferriere
