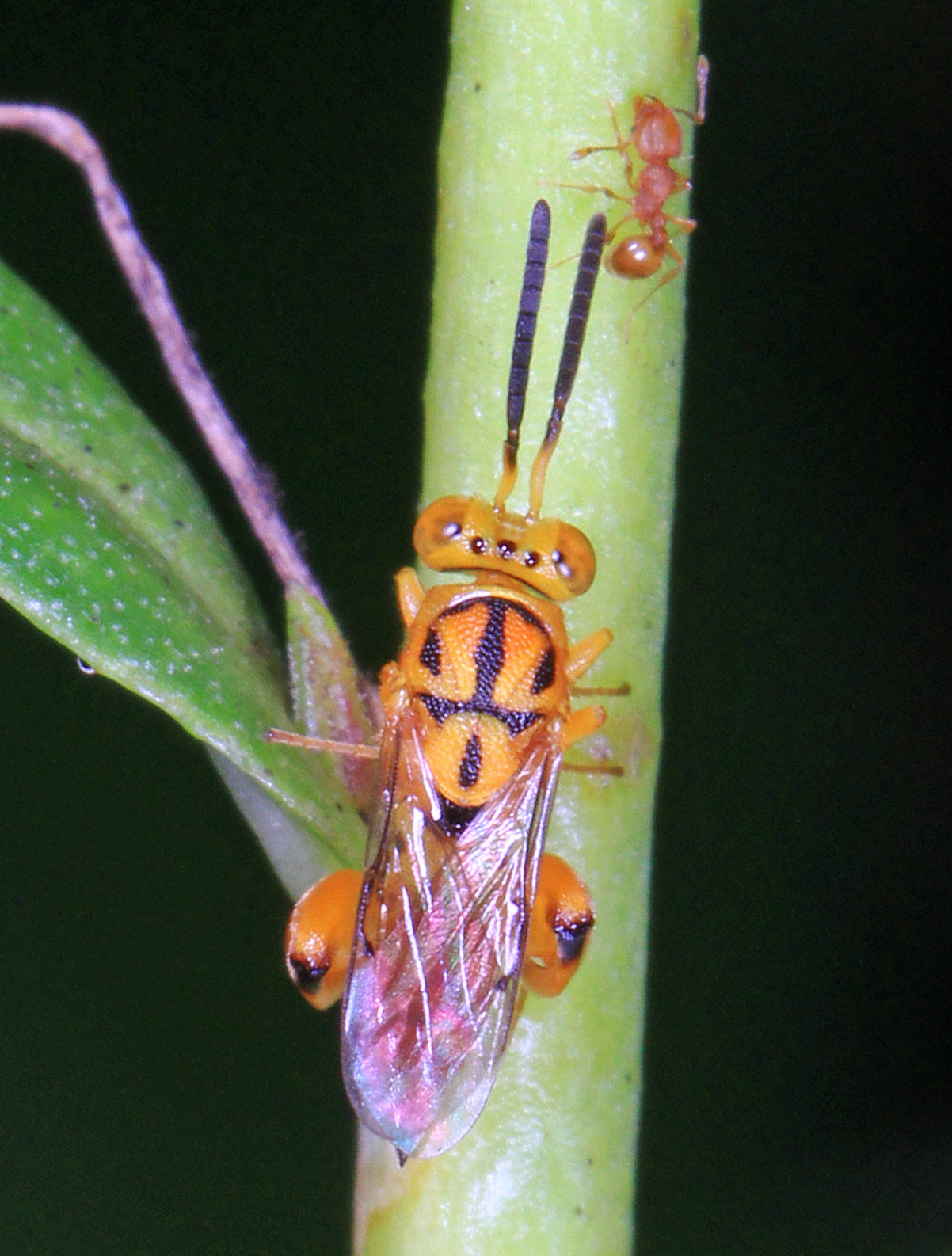

Scientific classification
- Kingdom: Animalia
- Phylum: Arthropoda
- Class: Insecta
- Order: Hymenoptera
- Family: Chalcididae
- Subfamily: Chalcidinae
- Genus: Conura; Spinola, 1837

Synonyms
- Spilochalcis Thomson, 1876

= Conura =

Genus of wasps

Conura is a genus of chalcidid wasps in the family Chalcididae, containing more than 300 species. They are distributed mostly in the New World, especially in the Neotropical region, where 279 species occur. Conura is divided into three subgenera and 63 species groups, which may not form taxonomic entities but reflect patterns of morphology that are useful for focused studies.

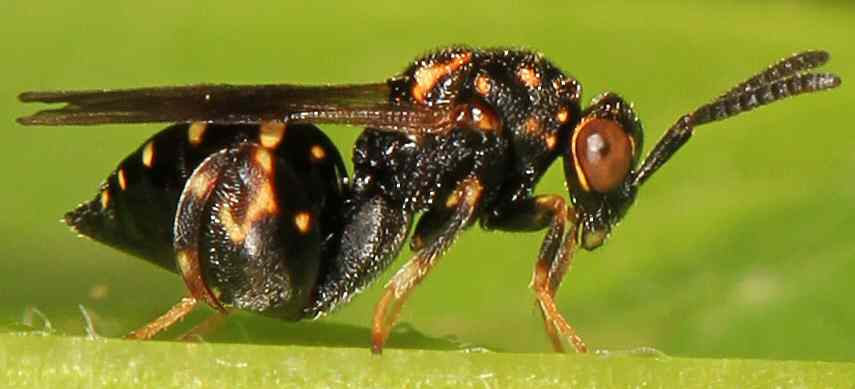

== Species ==
Subgenus Ceratosmicra

- Conura cocois (Wolcott, 1924)
- Conura cameroni (Ashmead, 1904)
- Conura fusiformis (Ashmead, 1904)
- Conura mayri (Ashmead, 1904)
- Conura tripunctata (Ashmead, 1904)
- Conura baturitei Tavares, 2019
- Conura convergea Delvare, 2003
- Conura dentiscapa Moitoza, 1994
- Conura delicata (Cresson, 1872)
- Conura bruchi (Blanchard, 1943)
- Conura elachis (Burks, 1940)
- Conura fulvovariegata (Cameron, 1884)
- Conura hirtifemora (Ashmead, 1885)
- Conura marcosensis (Cameron, 1904)
- Conura misturata (Howard, 1894)
- Conura perplexa (Ashmead, 1904)
- Conura petioliventris (Cameron, 1894)
- Conura pseudofulvovariegata (Becker, 1989)
- Conura ruffinellii (Blanchard, 1947)
- Conura unimaculata (Ashmead, 1904)
- Conura camescens Delvare, 1992
- Conura immaculata (Cresson, 1865)
- Conura lissa (Burks, 1940)
- Conura meteori (Burks, 1940)
- Conura onorei Delvare, 1992
- Conura albifrons (Walsh, 1861)
- Conura delumbis (Cresson, 1872)
- Conura dema (Burks, 1940)
- Conura dorsimaculata (Cameron, 1884)
- Conura flavopicta (Cresson, 1865)
- Conura leptis (Burks, 1940)
- Conura mendica (Cresson, 1872)
- Conura nigrita (Howard, 1894)
- Conura porteri (Brèthes, 1923)
- Conura sanguiniventris (Cresson, 1872)
- Conura side (Walker, 1843)
- Conura torvina (Cresson, 1872)
- Conura tanais (Burks, 1940)

Subgenus Conura

- Conura bouceki Delvare, 1992
- Conura dares (Walker, 1842)
- Conura incongrua (Ashmead, 1904)
- Conura acragae Delvare, 1993
- Conura ardens (Cameron, 1897)
- Conura bergi (Kirby, 1885)
- Conura celsa (Walker, 1864)
- Conura chapadae (Ashmead, 1904)
- Conura chapadensis (Ashmead, 1904)
- Conura corumbensis (Ashmead, 1904)
- Conura enocki (Ashmead, 1904)
- Conura fasciola (Cameron, 1897)
- Conura flammeola (Cresson, 1872)
- Conura flavicans Spinola, 1837
- Conura howardi (Ashmead, 1904)
- Conura igneoides (Kirby, 1883)
- Conura igneopatruelis Moitoza, 1994
- Conura leptogastra (Cameron, 1909)
- Conura lineocoxalis (Ashmead, 1904)
- Conura luteipennis (Walker, 1862)
- Conura maculata (Fabricius, 1787)
- Conura magistrettii (Blanchard, 1941)
- Conura maria (Riley, 1870)
- Conura mendozaensis (Cameron, 1909)
- Conura miniata (Cameron, 1884)
- Conura nigrifrons (Cameron, 1884)
- Conura patagonica (Blanchard, 1935)
- Conura phais (Burks, 1940)
- Conura pilosipartis Moitoza, 1994
- Conura rodriguezi (Cockerell, 1912)
- Conura segoviae (Cameron, 1904)
- Conura sordida (Walker, 1862)
- Conura strigosa (Costa, 1864)
- Conura vagabunda (Ashmead, 1904)
- Conura azteca (Cresson, 1872)
- Conura coccinea (Cresson, 1865)
- Conura conjungens (Walker, 1871)
- Conura coxalis (Cresson, 1872)
- Conura flavoaxillaris (Ashmead, 1904)
- Conura koehleri (Blanchard, 1935)
- Conura lasnierii (Guérin-Méneville, 1844)
- Conura martinezi Delvare, 1993
- Conura montezuma (Cresson, 1872)
- Conura napo Delvare, 1993
- Conura nigricornis (Fabricius, 1798)
- Conura nortonii (Cresson, 1872)
- Conura phobetronae Delvare, 1993
- Conura pompiloides (Walker, 1871)
- Conura rufa (Gahan, 1934)
- Conura sibinecola (Blanchard, 1935)
- Conura silvestrii (de Santis, 1980)
- Conura basilica (Walker, 1864)
- Conura elaeisis Delvare, 1993
- Conura fortidens (Cameron, 1909)
- Conura giraulti (de Santis, 1979)
- Conura mexicana (Cresson, 1872)
- Conura oiketicusi (Cameron, 1913)
- Conura philippia Delvare, 1992
- Conura steffani Delvare, 1992
- Conura toluca (Cresson, 1872)
- Conura vau (Ashmead, 1904)

Subgenus Spilochalcis

- Conura blanda (Walker, 1864)
- Conura flavoorbitalis (Ashmead, 1904)
- Conura magdalenensis Delvare, 1993
- Conura marginata (Ashmead, 1904)
- Conura tolteca (Cresson, 1872)
- Conura napoca Delvare, 1992
- Conura picta (Fabricius, 1804)
- Conura scutellaris (Cresson, 1865)
- Conura tygen Delvare, 1992
- Conura chrysomera (Walker, 1862)
- Conura scissa (Walker, 1864)
- Conura coccinata (Cresson, 1872)
- Conura dimidiata (Fabricius, 1804)
- Conura annexa (Walker, 1864)
- Conura exinaniens (Walker, 1864)
- Conura pylas (Walker, 1842)
- Conura huberi Delvare, 1992
- Conura leucotela (Walker, 1862)
- Conura referator (Walker, 1862)
- Conura sichelata Delvare, 1992
- Conura similis (Ashmead, 1904)
- Conura surumuae Delvare, 1992
- Conura transidiata Delvare, 1992
- Conura accila (Walker, 1841)
- Conura decisa (Walker, 1862)
- Conura destinata (Walker, 1864)
- Conura dorsata (Cresson, 1872)
- Conura eubule (Cresson, 1865)
- Conura foveata (Kirby, 1883)
- Conura phoenica (Burks, 1940)
- Conura transitiva (Walker, 1862)
- Conura vesicula Delvare, 1992
- Conura acutigaster Delvare, 1992
- Conura aequalis (Walker, 1864)
- Conura demota (Walker, 1864)
- Conura trilineata (Ashmead, 1904)
- Conura apaiis (Burks, 1940)
- Conura desmieri Delvare, 1993
- Conura hispinephaga Delvare, 1993
- Conura arcuaspina Delvare, 1992
- Conura biannulata (Ashmead, 1904)
- Conura minuta Delvare, 1992
- Conura carinata Delvare, 1992
- Conura carinifera Delvare, 1992
- Conura contributa (Walker, 1864)
- Conura cressoni (Howard, 1897)
- Conura debilis (Say, 1836)
- Conura longipetiola (Ashmead, 1885)
- Conura quadrilineata (Cameron, 1913)
- Conura prodebilis Delvare, 1992
- Conura adjuncta (Walker, 1864)
- Conura albomaculata (Ashmead, 1904)
- Conura annulifera (Walker, 1864)
- Conura bipunctata (Ashmead, 1904)
- Conura discolor (Walker, 1862)
- Conura ghilianii (Spinola, 1851)
- Conura lauta (Cresson, 1872)
- Conura lenta (Cresson, 1872)
- Conura lobata (Costa, 1864)
- Conura santaremensis (Ashmead, 1904)
- Conura tarsalis (Ashmead, 1904)
- Conura santarema (Ashmead, 1904)
- Conura testaceicollis (Cameron, 1913)
- Conura tuberculata (Ashmead, 1904)
- Conura elongata Delvare, 1992
- Conura janzeni Delvare, 1992
- Conura adela (Burks, 1939)
- Conura alutacea Delvare, 1992
- Conura lenkoi (de Santis, 1980)
- Conura maculipennis (Cameron, 1884)
- Conura media (Ashmead, 1904)
- Conura timida (Ashmead, 1904)
- Conura asantaremensis (Girault, 1913)
- Conura melana (Burks, 1940)
- Conura flaviscutellum (Girault, 1913)
- Conura nigropetiolata (Ashmead, 1904)
- Conura odontotae (Howard, 1885)
- Conura paya (Burks, 1940)
- Conura planifrons Delvare, 1992
- Conura propodea Delvare, 1992
- Conura rasplusi Delvare, 1992
- Conura megalospila (Cameron, 1913)
- Conura rufodorsalis (Ashmead, 1904)
- Conura shemaida Delvare, 1992
- Conura hansoni Delvare, 1992
- Conura iota Delvare, 1992
- Conura rufoscutellaris (Ashmead, 1904)
- Conura townesi Delvare, 1992
- Conura tricolorata (Cameron, 1913)
- Conura arcana (Cresson, 1872)
- Conura brancensis (Ashmead, 1904)
- Conura capitulata (Costa, 1864)
- Conura coronata (Cameron, 1913)
- Conura juxta (Cresson, 1872)
- Conura laddi (Girault, 1913)
- Conura nigropleuralis (Ashmead, 1904)
- Conura pulchripes (Cameron, 1909)
- Conura tridentata Delvare, 1992
- Conura abdominalis (Walker, 1862)
- Conura andersoni (Waterston, 1916)
- Conura congolensis (Schmitz, 1946)
- Conura lecta (Cresson, 1872)
- Conura libanotica (Schmiedeknecht, 1909)
- Conura nigrorufa (Walker, 1852)
- Conura provancheri (Burks, 1968)
- Conura subobsoleta (Cresson, 1872)
- Conura tenebrosa (Walker, 1862)
- Conura xantha (Burks, 1940)
- Conura xanthostigma (Dalman, 1820)
- Conura alienata (Walker, 1864)
- Conura annulipes (Spinola, 1853)
- Conura appressa (Walker, 1864)
- Conura atrata (Ashmead, 1904)
- Conura certa (Walker, 1864)
- Conura compactilis (Cresson, 1872)
- Conura decipiens (Kirby, 1883)
- Conura discalis (Walker, 1862)
- Conura incerta (Kirby, 1883)
- Conura transversa (Walker, 1862)
- Conura brasiliensis (Ashmead, 1904)
- Conura composita (Walker, 1864)
- Conura convexa Delvare, 1992
- Conura scalpella Delvare, 1992
- Conura sexdentata (Cameron, 1884)
- Conura acuta (Fabricius, 1804)
- Conura correcta (Walker, 1864)
- Conura imitator (Walker, 1862)
- Conura axillaris (Ashmead, 1904)
- Conura bidentata (Ashmead, 1904)
- Conura distincta Delvare, 1992
- Conura emarginata (Fabricius, 1804)
- Conura apicalis (Ashmead, 1904)
- Conura attacta (Walker, 1864)
- Conura belti (Cameron, 1904)
- Conura congrua (Walker, 1862)
- Conura expleta (Walker, 1864)
- Conura femorata (Fabricius, 1775)
- Conura ferruginea (Fabricius, 1804)
- Conura meridionalis (Ashmead, 1904)
- Conura pintoi (de Santis, 1980)
- Conura sexmaculata (Ashmead, 1904)
- Conura unilineata (Ashmead, 1904)
- Conura mesomelas (Walker, 1862)
- Conura depicta (Walker, 1864)
- Conura hempeli (Ashmead, 1904)
- Conura quadripunctata (Fabricius, 1804)
- Conura initia Delvare, 1997
- Conura amoena (Say, 1836)
- Conura adsita (Walker, 1864)
- Conura aemula (Walker, 1864)
- Conura commoda (Walker, 1864)
- Conura costalis (Walker, 1862)
- Conura acuminata (Ashmead, 1904)
- Conura admixta (Walker, 1864)
- Conura contermina (Walker, 1864)
- Conura flava (Fabricius, 1804)
- Conura longicaudata (Ashmead, 1904)
- Conura variegata (Fabricius, 1804)
- Conura lutea Delvare, 1992
- Conura bennetti (de Santis, 1979)
- Conura costalimai (de Santis, 1980)
- Conura mourei (de Santis, 1980)
- Conura persimilis (Ashmead, 1904)
- Conura grisselli Delvare, 1992
- Conura hollandi (Ashmead, 1904)
- Conura ashmiata Delvare, 1992
- Conura ashmilis Delvare, 1992
- Conura burmeisteri (Kirby, 1883)
- Conura fischeri (Brèthes, 1927)
- Conura morleyi (Ashmead, 1904)
- Conura nebulosa (Walker, 1862)
- Conura pallens (Cresson, 1865)
- Conura pygmaea (Fabricius, 1804)
- Conura terminalis (Walker, 1864)

No subgenus

- Conura africanus (Schmitz, 1946)
- Conura ampyx (Walker, 1850)
- Conura anisitsi (Girault, 1911)
- Conura attalica (Walker, 1864)
- Conura bertonii (Brèthes, 1909)
- Conura brassolis (Schrottky, 1909)
- Conura capensis (Cameron, 1907)
- Conura carinifoveata (Cameron, 1909)
- Conura contacta (Walker, 1864)
- Conura efficta (Walker, 1864)
- Conura equadorica Özdikmen, 2011
- Conura fidius (Walker, 1850)
- Conura flavescens (André, 1881)
- Conura illata (Walker, 1862)
- Conura intermedia (Cresson, 1865)
- Conura laticeps (Ashmead, 1904)
- Conura leprieuri (Spinola, 1840)
- Conura noyesi Özdikmen, 2011
- Conura pallida (Holmgren, 1868)
- Conura paranensis (Schrottky, 1902)
- Conura pratinas (Walker, 1850)
- Conura saintpierrei (Girault, 1913)
- Conura scudderi (Brues, 1910)
- Conura spilosoma (Cameron, 1904)
- Conura torrida (Walker, 1852)
- Conura trichostibatis (Strand, 1911)
- Conura variicolor (Dalla Torre, 1898)
- Conura vigintidentata (Brèthes, 1922)
