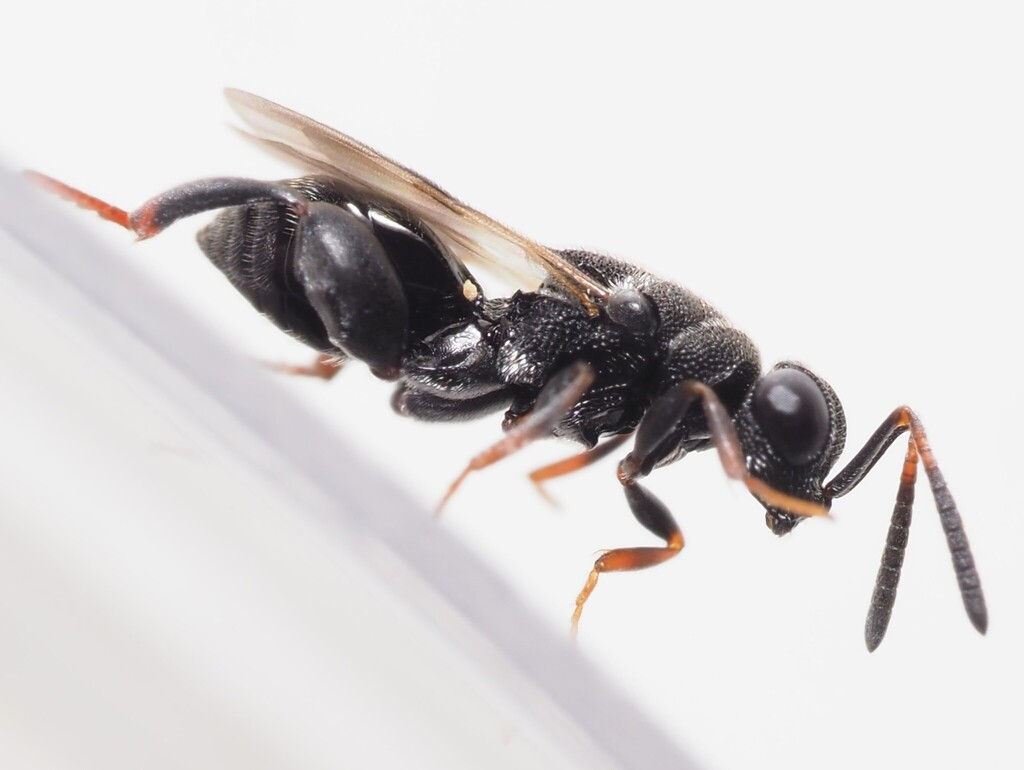
- Haltichella rufipes from Buckinghamshire, UK

Scientific classification
- Kingdom: Animalia
- Phylum: Arthropoda
- Clade: Pancrustacea
- Class: Insecta
- Order: Hymenoptera
- Family: Chalcididae
- Subfamily: Haltichellinae
- Genus: Haltichella; Spinola, 1811

= Haltichella =

Genus of wasps

Haltichella is a genus of chalcidid wasps in the family Chalcididae. There are at least 20 described species in Haltichella.

== Species ==
These 27 species belong to the genus Haltichella:

- Haltichella achterbergi Narendran, 1989^{c g}
- Haltichella bilobatus Schmitz, 1946^{c g}
- Haltichella burungae Schmitz, 1946^{c g}
- Haltichella cinchonica Narendran, 1989^{c g}
- Haltichella clavicornis (Ashmead, 1904)^{c g}
- Haltichella delhensis Roy & Farooqi, 1984^{c g}
- Haltichella flavipes Schmitz, 1946^{c g}
- Haltichella hydara (Walker, 1842)^{c g}
- Haltichella inermis Schmitz, 1946^{c g}
- Haltichella luzonica Masi, 1929^{c g}
- Haltichella macrocera Waterston, 1922^{c g}
- Haltichella magnidens (Girault, 1917)^{c g}
- Haltichella mboroensis Risbec, 1957^{c g}
- Haltichella megacerus Schmitz, 1946^{c g}
- Haltichella melana Schmitz, 1946^{c g}
- Haltichella nigroclava Roy & Farooqi, 1984^{c g}
- Haltichella nipponensis Habu, 1960^{c g}
- Haltichella onatas (Walker, 1843)^{c g b}
- Haltichella ornaticornis Cameron, 1884^{c g}
- Haltichella perpulcra (Walsh, 1861)^{c g}
- Haltichella rhyacioniae Gahan, 1927^{c g b}
- Haltichella rufipes (Olivier, 1791)^{c g}
- Haltichella rutshurui Schmitz, 1946^{c g}
- Haltichella swezeyi Fullaway, 1946^{c g}
- Haltichella uncinatus Schmitz, 1946^{c g}
- Haltichella variicolor Masi, 1929^{c g}
- Haltichella xanticles (Walker, 1843)^{c g b}

Data sources: i = ITIS, c = Catalogue of Life, g = GBIF, b = Bugguide.net
