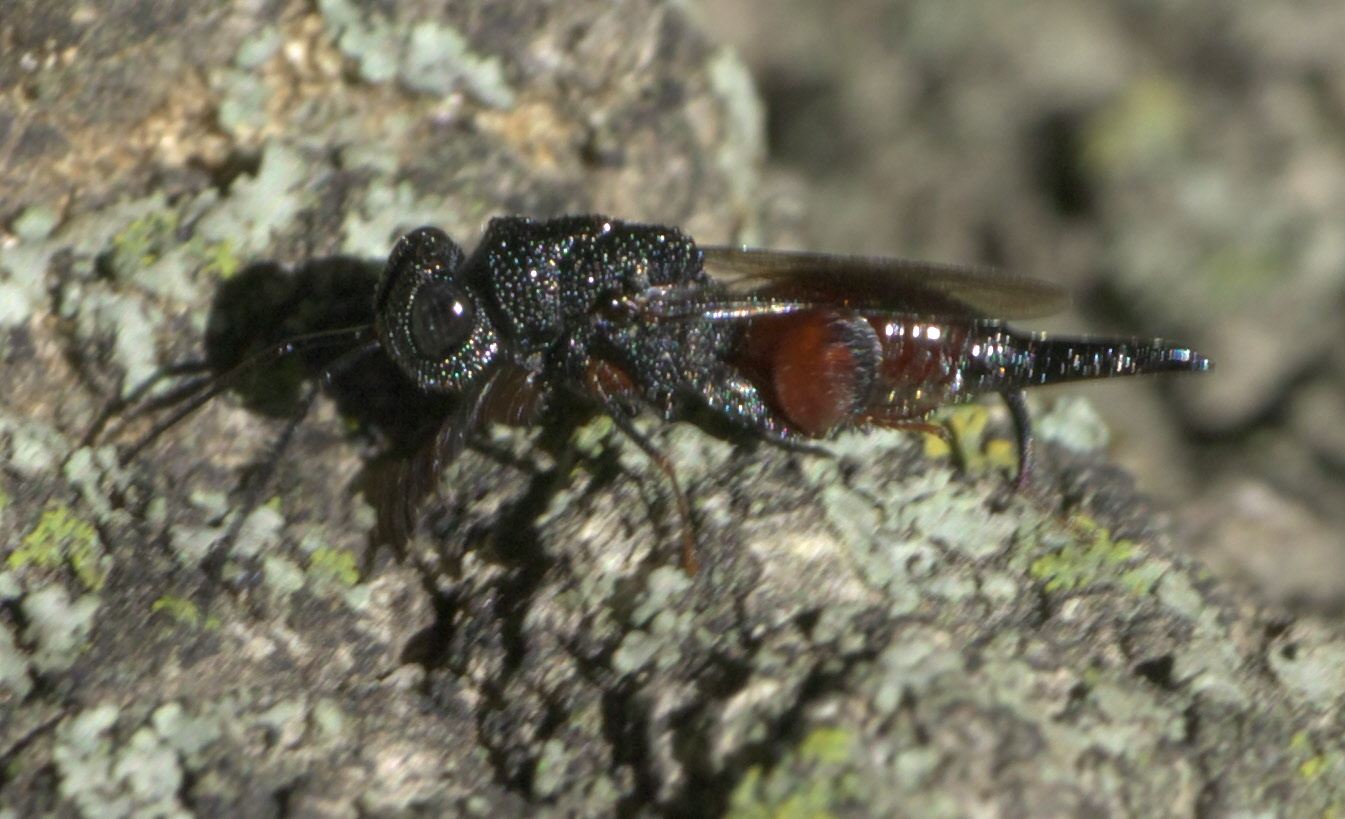

Scientific classification
- Kingdom: Animalia
- Phylum: Arthropoda
- Class: Insecta
- Order: Hymenoptera
- Family: Chalcididae
- Genus: Phasgonophora
- Species: P. sulcata

Binomial name
- Phasgonophora sulcata Westwood, 1832

= Phasgonophora sulcata =

Species of wasp

Phasgonophora sulcata is a species of chalcidid wasp in the family Chalcididae. It is a endoparasitoid of Agrilus beetles, and thus used in biological pest control of the emerald ash borer.
