= Cratocentrus ruficornis =

Scientific classification
- Kingdom: Animalia
- Phylum: Arthropoda
- Class: Insecta
- Order: Hymenoptera
- Family: Chalcididae
- Genus: Cratocentrus
- Species: C. ruficornis

Binomial name
- Cratocentrus ruficornis (Cameron, 1907)

Synonyms
- Cerachalcis argenteopilosa (Cameron, 1907); Cratocentrus bicornutus Cameron, 1907; Cratocentrus auropilosus Cameron, 1911; Cratocentrus argenteopilosus Cameron, 1907; Cerachalcis auropilosa (Cameron, 1911); Cerachalcis bicornuta (Cameron, 1907); Cerachalcis elegans Masi, 1944; Cratocentrus elegans (Masi, 1944)

Species of wasp

Cratocentrus ruficornis is a species of wasp in the family Chalcididae. It is found in Namibia, South Africa and Zimbabwe.
