= Lineodes hamulalis =

Scientific classification
- Kingdom: Animalia
- Phylum: Arthropoda
- Class: Insecta
- Order: Lepidoptera
- Family: Crambidae
- Genus: Lineodes
- Species: L. hamulalis

Binomial name
- Lineodes hamulalis Hampson, 1913

Species of moth

Lineodes hamulalis is a moth in the family Crambidae. It was described by George Hampson in 1913. It is found in Argentina.
