= Lineodes ochrea =

Scientific classification
- Kingdom: Animalia
- Phylum: Arthropoda
- Class: Insecta
- Order: Lepidoptera
- Family: Crambidae
- Genus: Lineodes
- Species: L. ochrea

Binomial name
- Lineodes ochrea Walsingham, 1907

Synonyms
- Lineodes subextincta Walsingham, 1907

Species of moth

Lineodes ochrea is a moth of the family Crambidae. It has only been recorded from Kauai, Oahu, Molokai and Hawaii, but might be an introduced species in Hawaii.

The larvae feed on eggplants.
