= Lineodes tridentalis =

Scientific classification
- Kingdom: Animalia
- Phylum: Arthropoda
- Class: Insecta
- Order: Lepidoptera
- Family: Crambidae
- Genus: Lineodes
- Species: L. tridentalis

Binomial name
- Lineodes tridentalis Hampson, 1913

Species of moth

Lineodes tridentalis is a moth in the family Crambidae. It was described by George Hampson in 1913. It is found in Guyana and Honduras.
