= Lineodes triangulalis =

Scientific classification
- Kingdom: Animalia
- Phylum: Arthropoda
- Class: Insecta
- Order: Lepidoptera
- Family: Crambidae
- Genus: Lineodes
- Species: L. triangulalis

Binomial name
- Lineodes triangulalis Möschler, 1890

Synonyms
- Lineodes cyclophora Hampson, 1913; Lineodes triangularis Walsingham, 1915

Species of moth

Lineodes triangulalis is a moth in the family Crambidae. It was described by Heinrich Benno Möschler in 1890. It is found in Cuba, Puerto Rico, Jamaica, Dominica, the Bahamas, Mexico, Honduras, Guatemala, Colombia, Trinidad and Venezuela. In the United States it has been recorded from Florida and Texas.

The length of the forewings is 7.7-9.7 mm.

The larvae have been reared on the leaves of Capsicum frutescens.
