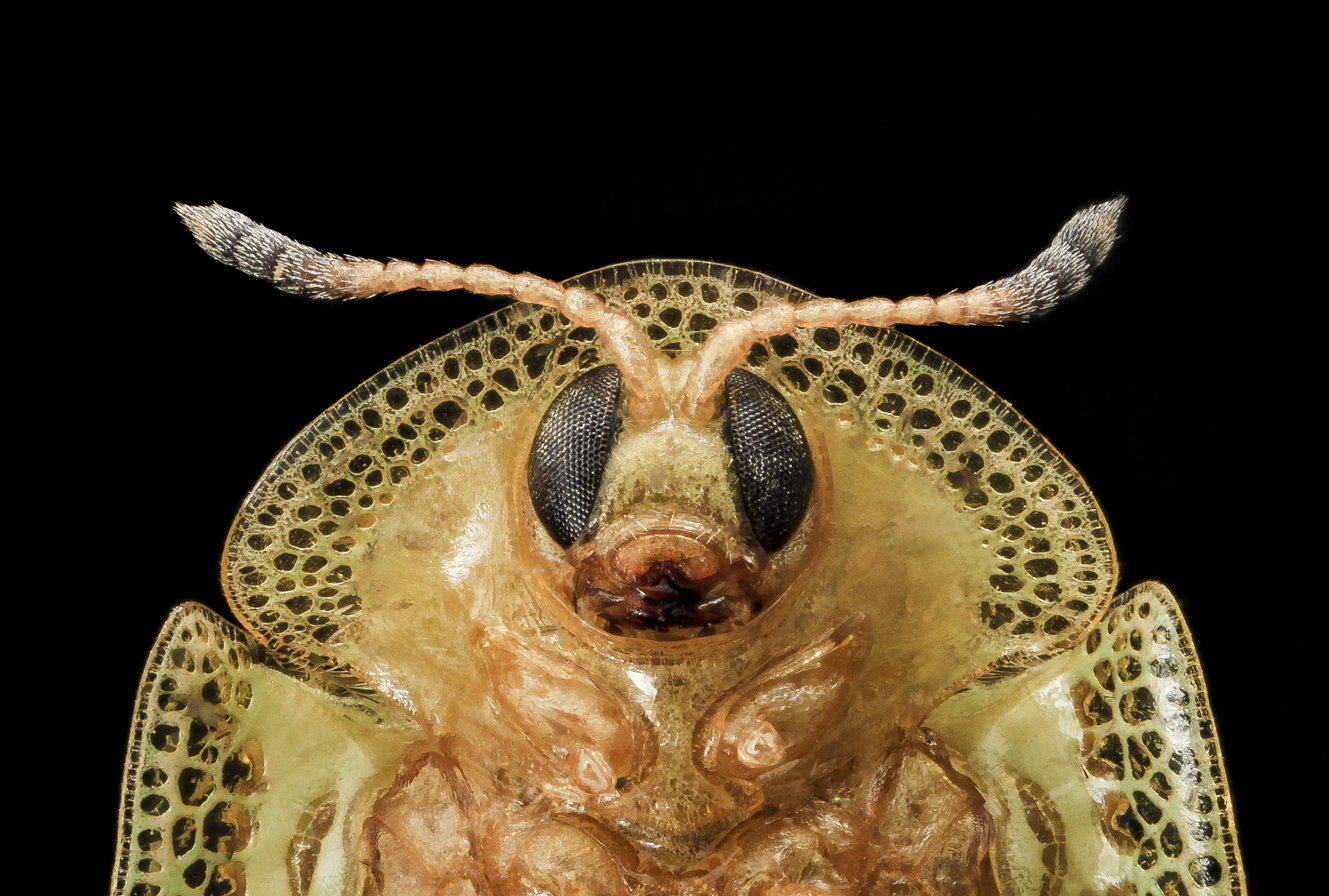
- Gratiana pallidula

Scientific classification
- Kingdom: Animalia
- Phylum: Arthropoda
- Clade: Pancrustacea
- Class: Insecta
- Order: Coleoptera
- Suborder: Polyphaga
- Infraorder: Cucujiformia
- Family: Chrysomelidae
- Subfamily: Cassidinae
- Tribe: Cassidini
- Genus: Gratiana; Spaeth, 1913

= Gratiana (beetle) =

Genus of beetles

Gratiana is a genus of tortoise beetles in the family Chrysomelidae. There are about seven described species in Gratiana.

== Species ==
These seven species belong to the genus Gratiana:

- Gratiana boliviana Spaeth, 1926^{i c g b} (tropical soda apple leaf beetle)
- Gratiana conformis (Boheman, 1854)^{i c g}
- Gratiana graminea (Klug, 1829)^{i c g}
- Gratiana insculpta (Boheman, 1855)^{i c g}
- Gratiana lutescens (Boheman, 1854)^{i c g}
- Gratiana pallidula (Boheman, 1854)^{i c g b} (eggplant tortoise beetle)
- Gratiana spadicea (Klug, 1829)^{i c g}

Data sources: i = ITIS, c = Catalogue of Life, g = GBIF, b = Bugguide.net
