= Lineodes metagrammalis =

Scientific classification
- Kingdom: Animalia
- Phylum: Arthropoda
- Class: Insecta
- Order: Lepidoptera
- Family: Crambidae
- Genus: Lineodes
- Species: L. metagrammalis

Binomial name
- Lineodes metagrammalis Möschler, 1890

Species of moth

Lineodes metagrammalis is a moth in the family Crambidae. It was described by Heinrich Benno Möschler in 1890. It is found in Puerto Rico.
