= Lineodes venezuelensis =

Scientific classification
- Kingdom: Animalia
- Phylum: Arthropoda
- Class: Insecta
- Order: Lepidoptera
- Family: Crambidae
- Genus: Lineodes
- Species: L. venezuelensis

Binomial name
- Lineodes venezuelensis Amsel, 1956

Species of moth

Lineodes venezuelensis is a moth in the family Crambidae. It was described by Hans Georg Amsel in 1956 and is found in Venezuela and Peru.

The larvae feed on the buds, fruit and leaves of Capsicum annuum.
