= Lineodes longipes =

Scientific classification
- Kingdom: Animalia
- Phylum: Arthropoda
- Clade: Pancrustacea
- Class: Insecta
- Order: Lepidoptera
- Family: Crambidae
- Genus: Lineodes
- Species: L. longipes

Binomial name
- Lineodes longipes (Sepp, 1845)

Synonyms
- Phalaena longipes Sepp, 1845

Species of moth

Lineodes longipes is a moth in the family Crambidae. It was described by Sepp in 1845. It is found on Suriname.
