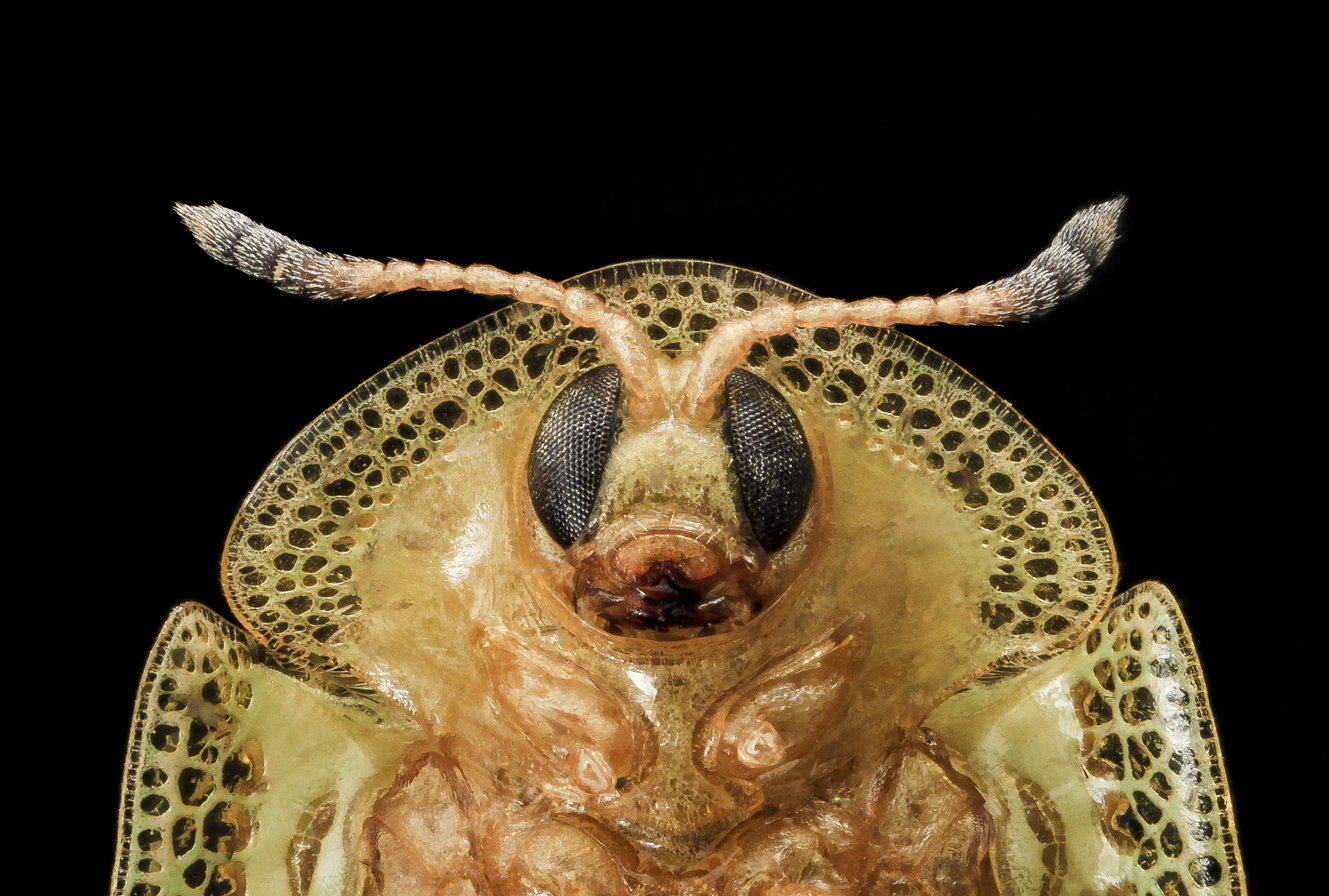

Scientific classification
- Kingdom: Animalia
- Phylum: Arthropoda
- Class: Insecta
- Order: Coleoptera
- Suborder: Polyphaga
- Infraorder: Cucujiformia
- Family: Chrysomelidae
- Genus: Gratiana
- Species: G. pallidula

Binomial name
- Gratiana pallidula (Boheman, 1854)

= Gratiana pallidula =

Species of beetle

Gratiana pallidula, the eggplant tortoise beetle, is a species of tortoise beetle in the family Chrysomelidae. It is found in Central America and North America.

Adult: in most live individuals, pronotum light green, elytra light golden brown with explanate, transparent margins; color of dead specimens mostly medium brown with lighter brownish-yellow margins; body oblong; elytral margins almost parallel-sided for more than half of their length; elytral disc with many small surface pits arranged in several longitudinal rows.

Larva: may be at least partly green, and carry a fecal shield above its back.
