= Lineodes formosalis =

Scientific classification
- Kingdom: Animalia
- Phylum: Arthropoda
- Class: Insecta
- Order: Lepidoptera
- Family: Crambidae
- Genus: Lineodes
- Species: L. formosalis

Binomial name
- Lineodes formosalis Amsel, 1956

Synonyms
- Lineodes formosella Munroe, 1995

Species of moth

Lineodes formosalis is a moth in the family Crambidae. It was described by Hans Georg Amsel in 1956 and is found in Venezuela.
