= Lineodes caracasia =

Scientific classification
- Kingdom: Animalia
- Phylum: Arthropoda
- Class: Insecta
- Order: Lepidoptera
- Family: Crambidae
- Genus: Lineodes
- Species: L. caracasia

Binomial name
- Lineodes caracasia Amsel, 1956

Species of moth

Lineodes caracasia is a moth in the family Crambidae. It was described by Hans Georg Amsel in 1956 and is found in Venezuela.
