= Lineodes contortalis =

Scientific classification
- Kingdom: Animalia
- Phylum: Arthropoda
- Class: Insecta
- Order: Lepidoptera
- Family: Crambidae
- Genus: Lineodes
- Species: L. contortalis

Binomial name
- Lineodes contortalis Guenée, 1854

Species of moth

Lineodes contortalis is a moth in the family Crambidae. It was described by Achille Guenée in 1854. It is found in Brazil and Cuba.
