= Lineodes craspediodonta =

Scientific classification
- Kingdom: Animalia
- Phylum: Arthropoda
- Class: Insecta
- Order: Lepidoptera
- Family: Crambidae
- Genus: Lineodes
- Species: L. craspediodonta

Binomial name
- Lineodes craspediodonta Dyar, 1913

Species of moth

Lineodes craspediodonta is a moth in the family Crambidae. It was described by Harrison Gray Dyar Jr. in 1913. It is found in Bolivia.
