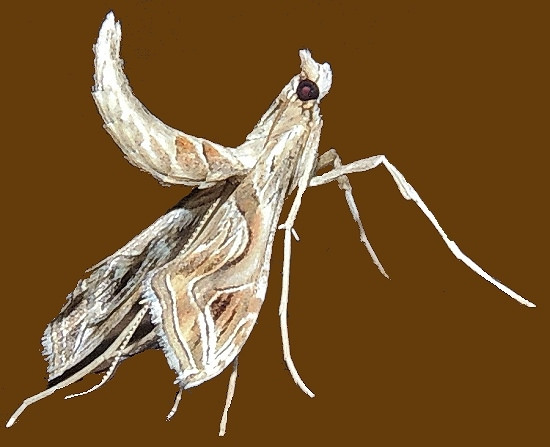
- Lineodes integra

Scientific classification
- Kingdom: Animalia
- Phylum: Arthropoda
- Clade: Pancrustacea
- Class: Insecta
- Order: Lepidoptera
- Family: Crambidae
- Subfamily: Spilomelinae
- Tribe: Lineodini
- Genus: Lineodes; Guenée, 1854

Synonyms
- Ciraphorus Dyar, 1910; Scoptonoma Zeller, 1873

= Lineodes =

Genus of moth

Lineodes is a genus of snout moths of the subfamily Spilomelinae in the family Crambidae. The genus was described by Achille Guenée in 1854, with Lineodes hieroglyphalis as the type species.

The genus is mostly Neotropical and southern Nearctic in distribution (with the exception of Lineodes longipes, described from Sumatra) and currently comprises 38 species.

== Species ==
- Lineodes albicincta E. Hering, 1906
- Lineodes aztecalis Hampson, 1913
- Lineodes caracasia Amsel, 1956
- Lineodes contortalis Guenée, 1854
- Lineodes convolutalis Hampson, 1913
- Lineodes corinnae Landry, 2016
- Lineodes craspediodonta Dyar, 1913
- Lineodes dianalis Hampson, 1913
- Lineodes elcodes (Dyar, 1910)
- Lineodes encystalis Hampson, 1913
- Lineodes fontella Walsingham in Hampson, 1913
- Lineodes formosalis Amsel, 1956
- Lineodes furcillata E. Hering, 1906
- Lineodes gracilalis (Herrich-Schäffer, 1871)
- Lineodes hamulalis Hampson, 1913
- Lineodes hieroglyphalis Guenée, 1854
- Lineodes integra (Zeller, 1873)
- Lineodes interrupta (Zeller, 1873)
- Lineodes latipennis Walsingham in Hampson, 1913
- Lineodes leucostrigalis Hampson, 1913
- Lineodes longipes (Sepp, 1852)
- Lineodes mesodonta Hampson, 1913
- Lineodes metagrammalis Möschler, 1890
- Lineodes monetalis Dyar, 1913
- Lineodes multisignalis Herrich-Schäffer, 1868
- Lineodes ochrea Walsingham, 1907
- Lineodes peterseni Walsingham in Hampson, 1913
- Lineodes polychroalis Hampson, 1913
- Lineodes pulcherrima E. Hering, 1906
- Lineodes pulchralis Guenée, 1854
- Lineodes serpulalis Lederer, 1863
- Lineodes tipuloides Walsingham, 1891
- Lineodes triangulalis Möschler, 1890
- Lineodes tridentalis Hampson, 1913
- Lineodes undulata Walsingham in Hampson, 1913
- Lineodes venezuelensis Amsel, 1956
- Lineodes vulcanalis Landry, 2016
- Lineodes vulnifica Dyar, 1913
