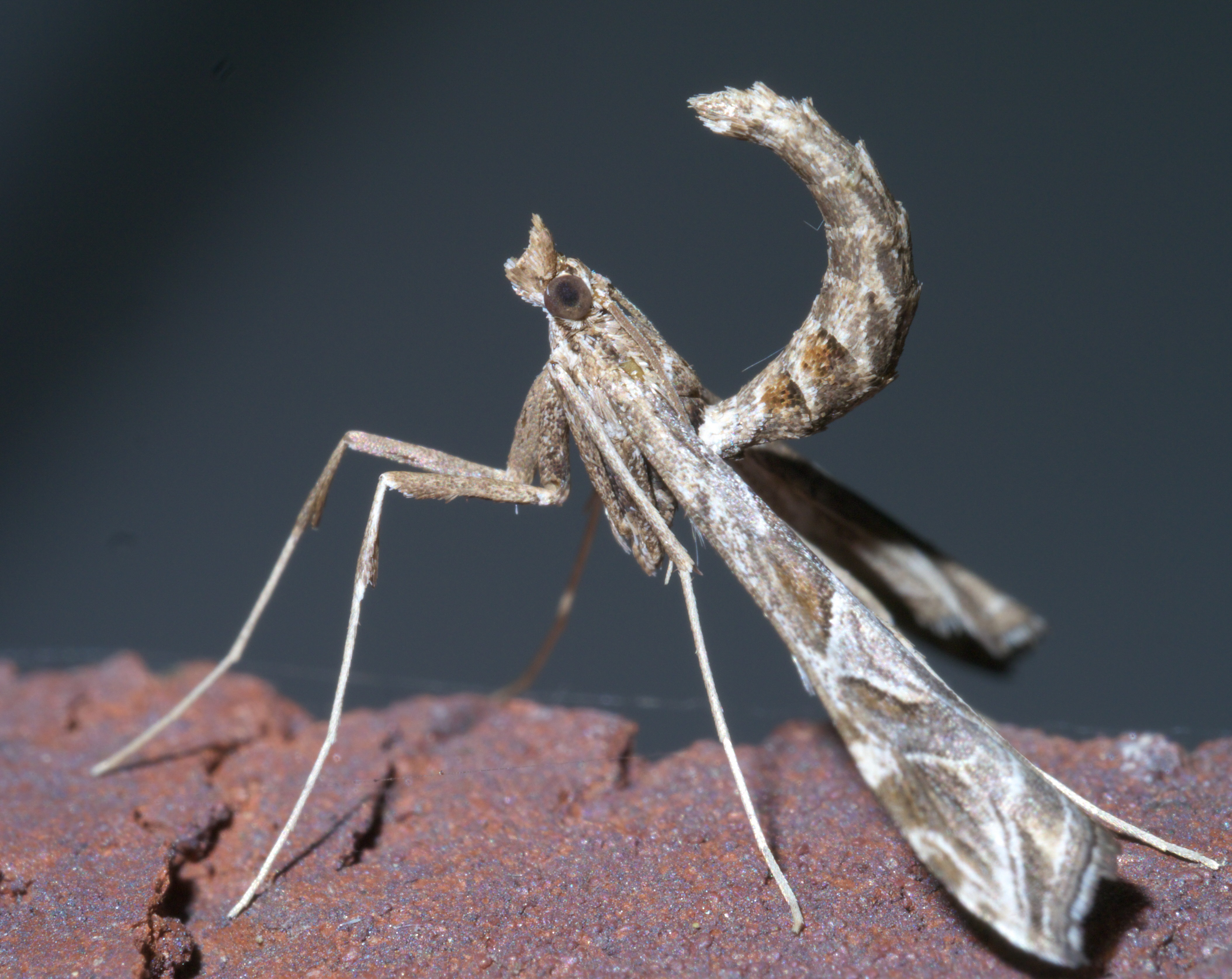

Scientific classification
- Kingdom: Animalia
- Phylum: Arthropoda
- Clade: Pancrustacea
- Class: Insecta
- Order: Lepidoptera
- Family: Crambidae
- Genus: Lineodes
- Species: L. interrupta

Binomial name
- Lineodes interrupta (Zeller, 1873)

Synonyms
- Scoptonoma interrupta Zeller, 1873

= Lineodes interrupta =

Species of moth

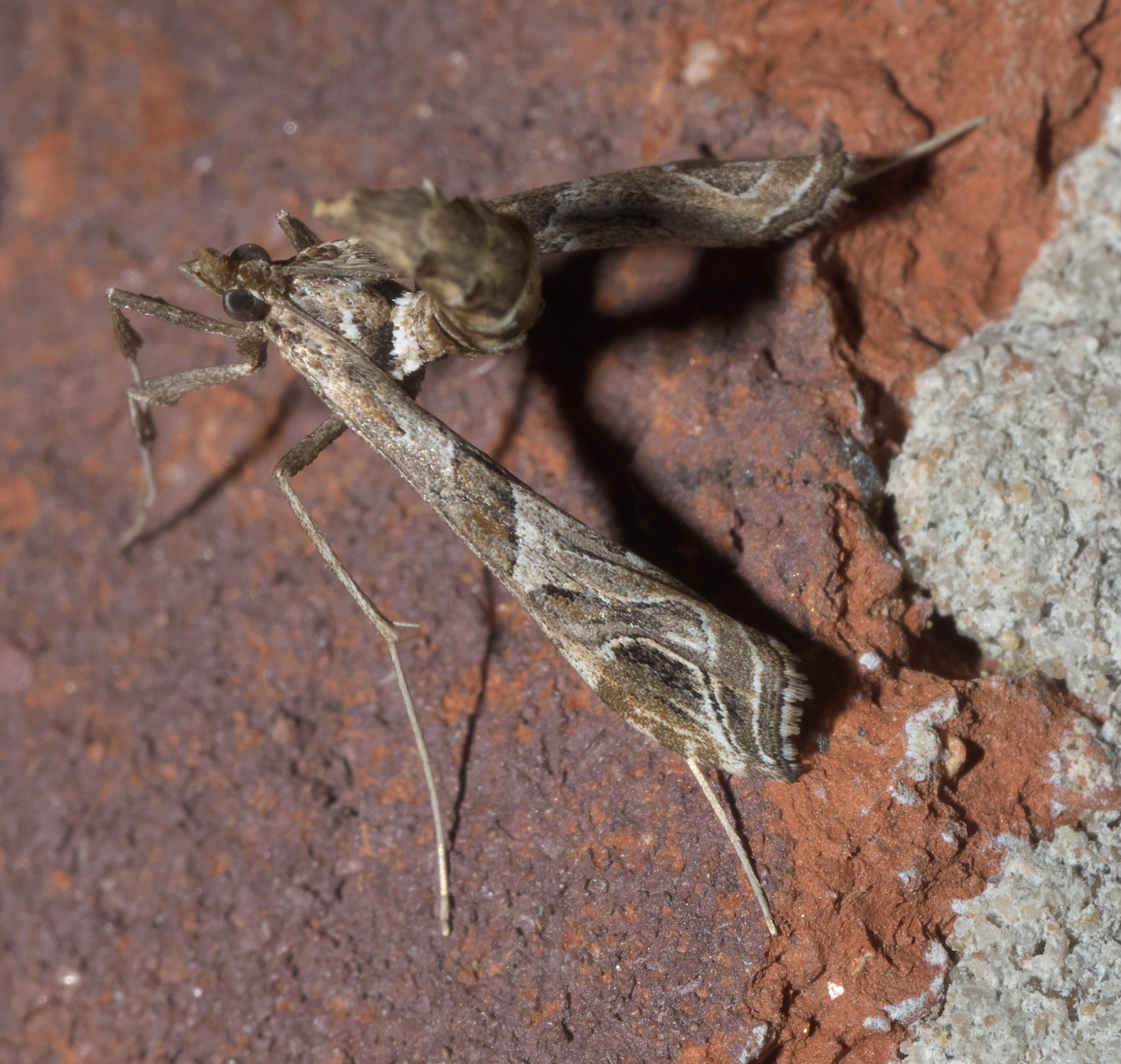
Lineodes interrupta

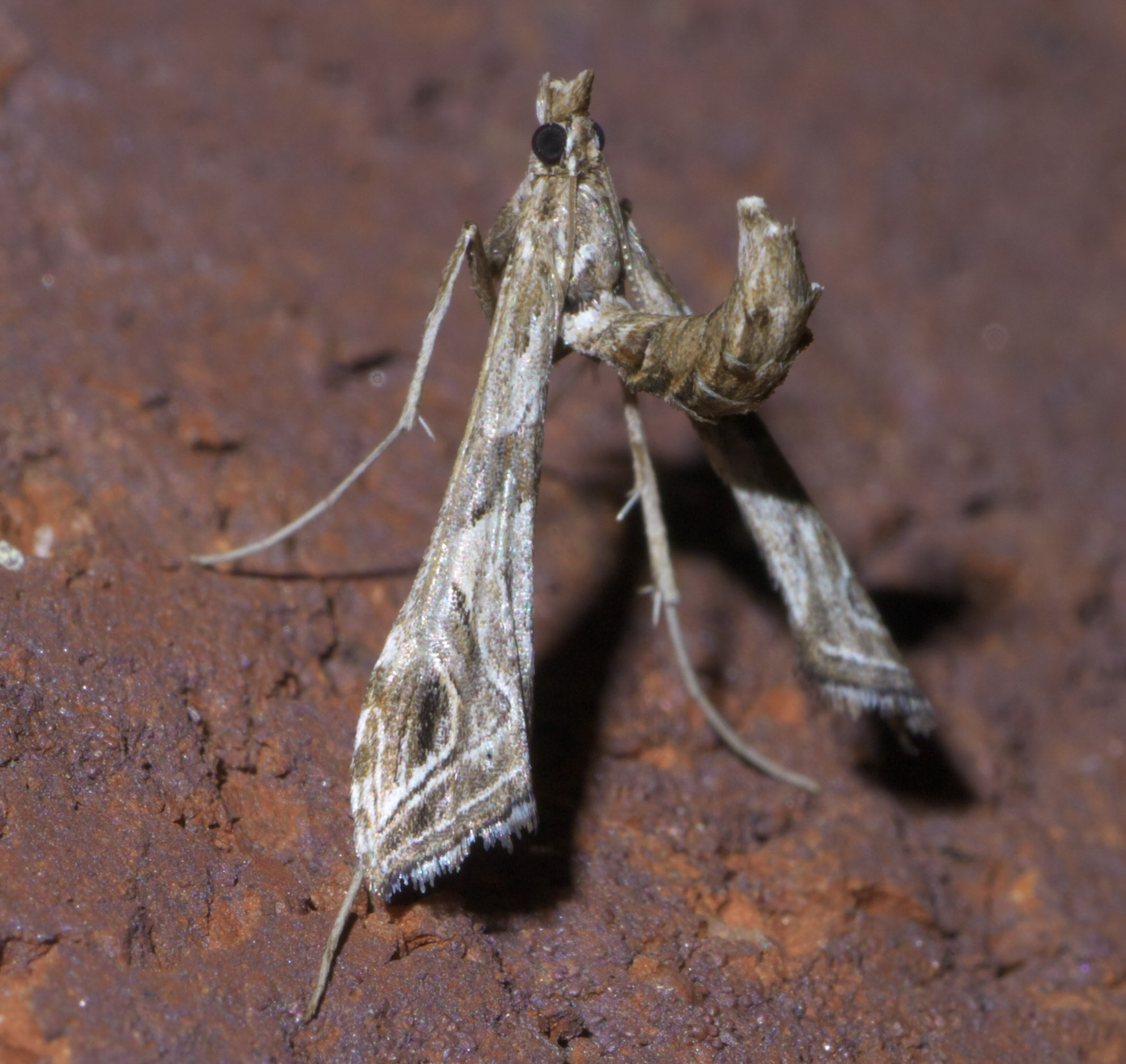
Lineodes interrupta

Lineodes interrupta is a moth in the family Crambidae. It was described by Zeller in 1873. It is found in Mexico and the United States, where it has been recorded from Florida, Louisiana, Oklahoma and Texas.

The wingspan is about 21 mm. Adults have been recorded on wing nearly year-round.
