= Lineodes latipennis =

Scientific classification
- Kingdom: Animalia
- Phylum: Arthropoda
- Class: Insecta
- Order: Lepidoptera
- Family: Crambidae
- Genus: Lineodes
- Species: L. latipennis

Binomial name
- Lineodes latipennis Walsingham in Hampson, 1913

Species of moth

Lineodes latipennis is a moth in the family Crambidae. It was described by Walsingham in 1913. It is found in Colombia.
