= Lineodes pulchralis =

Scientific classification
- Kingdom: Animalia
- Phylum: Arthropoda
- Class: Insecta
- Order: Lepidoptera
- Family: Crambidae
- Genus: Lineodes
- Species: L. pulchralis

Binomial name
- Lineodes pulchralis Guenée, 1854

Species of moth

Lineodes pulchralis is a moth in the family Crambidae. It was described by Achille Guenée in 1854. It is found in Brazil.
