= Lineodes gracilalis =

Scientific classification
- Kingdom: Animalia
- Phylum: Arthropoda
- Class: Insecta
- Order: Lepidoptera
- Family: Crambidae
- Genus: Lineodes
- Species: L. gracilalis

Binomial name
- Lineodes gracilalis Herrich-Schäffer, 1871

Synonyms
- Botys gracilalis Hulst, 1886; Lineodes gracilaris Walsingham, 1915; Lineodes gracillalis Hampson, 1913; Lineodes graciealis

Species of moth

Lineodes gracilalis is a moth in the family Crambidae. It was described by Gottlieb August Wilhelm Herrich-Schäffer in 1871. It is found in Cuba and Puerto Rico.

The larvae feed on Brunfelsia species.
