= Lineodes monetalis =

Scientific classification
- Kingdom: Animalia
- Phylum: Arthropoda
- Class: Insecta
- Order: Lepidoptera
- Family: Crambidae
- Genus: Lineodes
- Species: L. monetalis

Binomial name
- Lineodes monetalis Dyar, 1913

Species of moth

Lineodes monetalis is a moth in the family Crambidae. It was described by Harrison Gray Dyar Jr. in 1913. It is found in Mexico.
