= Lineodes aztecalis =

Scientific classification
- Kingdom: Animalia
- Phylum: Arthropoda
- Class: Insecta
- Order: Lepidoptera
- Family: Crambidae
- Genus: Lineodes
- Species: L. aztecalis

Binomial name
- Lineodes aztecalis Hampson, 1913

Synonyms
- Lineodes contortalis Druce, 1895 (preocc.)

Species of moth

Lineodes aztecalis is a moth in the family Crambidae. It was described by George Hampson in 1913. It is found in Xalapa, Mexico.
