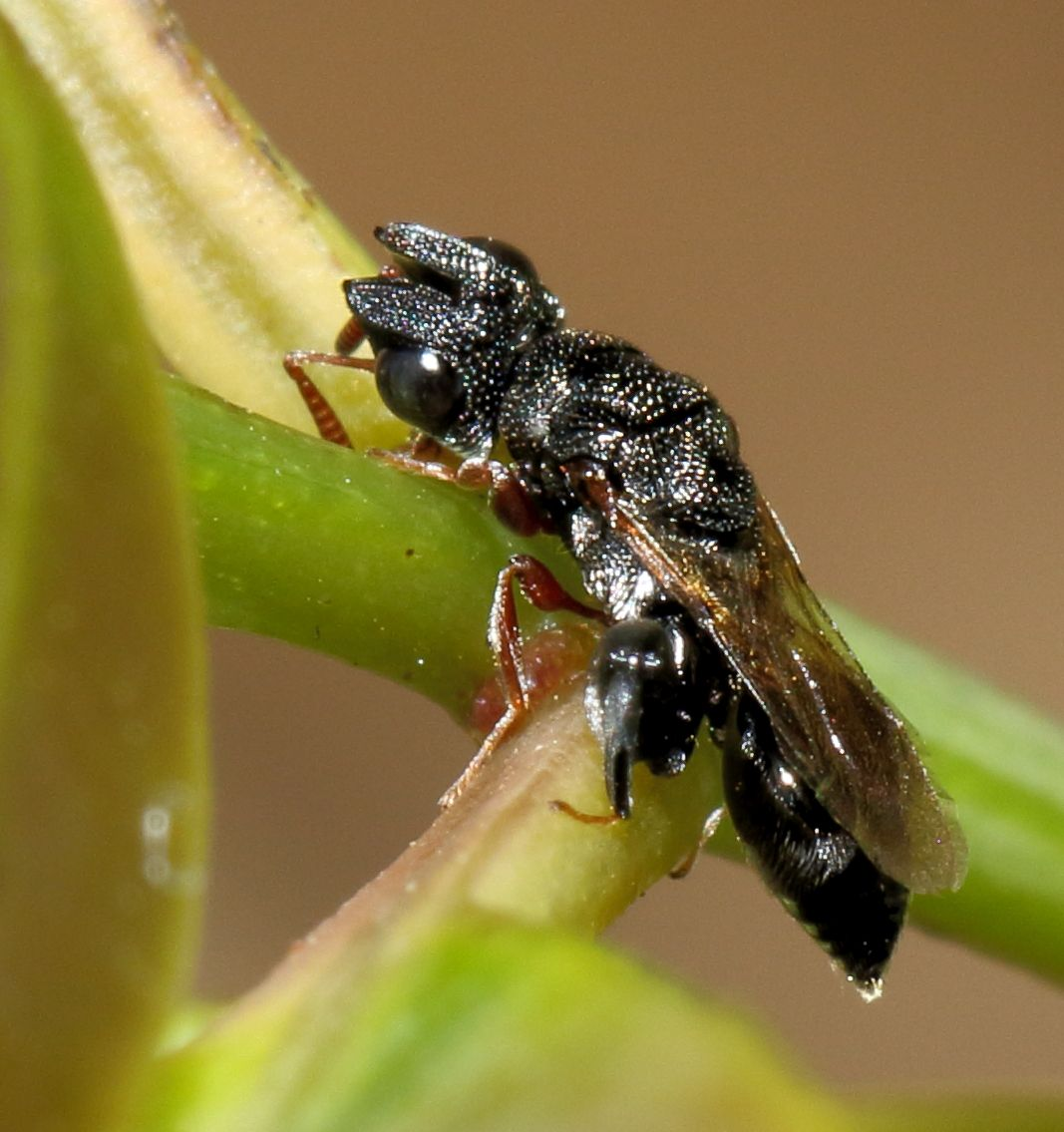

Scientific classification
- Kingdom: Animalia
- Phylum: Arthropoda
- Clade: Pancrustacea
- Class: Insecta
- Order: Hymenoptera
- Family: Chalcididae
- Subfamily: Dirhininae; Ashmead, 1904

Genera
- Aplorhinus; Dirhinus; Pseudeniaca; Youngaia

= Dirhininae =

Subfamily of wasps

Dirhininae is a subfamily of chalcidid wasps in the family Chalcididae. There are four genera.

Dirhinini have a pair of horns on the head and found in the tropics. This group has more than 100 species but many are undescribed.

It develops as a parasite using a host, usually various Brachycera.

The wasp uses its horns, mandible, and their heavy body to emerge from the host.
