= Lineodes hieroglyphalis =

Scientific classification
- Kingdom: Animalia
- Phylum: Arthropoda
- Class: Insecta
- Order: Lepidoptera
- Family: Crambidae
- Genus: Lineodes
- Species: L. hieroglyphalis

Binomial name
- Lineodes hieroglyphalis Guenée, 1854

Synonyms
- Lineodes hieroglyphicalis Lederer, 1863

Species of moth

Lineodes hieroglyphalis is a moth in the family Crambidae. It was described by Achille Guenée in 1854. It is found in Brazil.
