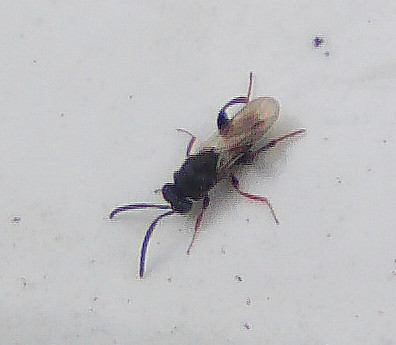
- Haltichella

Scientific classification
- Kingdom: Animalia
- Phylum: Arthropoda
- Class: Insecta
- Order: Hymenoptera
- Family: Chalcididae
- Subfamily: Haltichellinae

= Haltichellinae =

Subfamily of wasps

Haltichellinae is a subfamily of chalcidid wasps in the family Chalcididae.

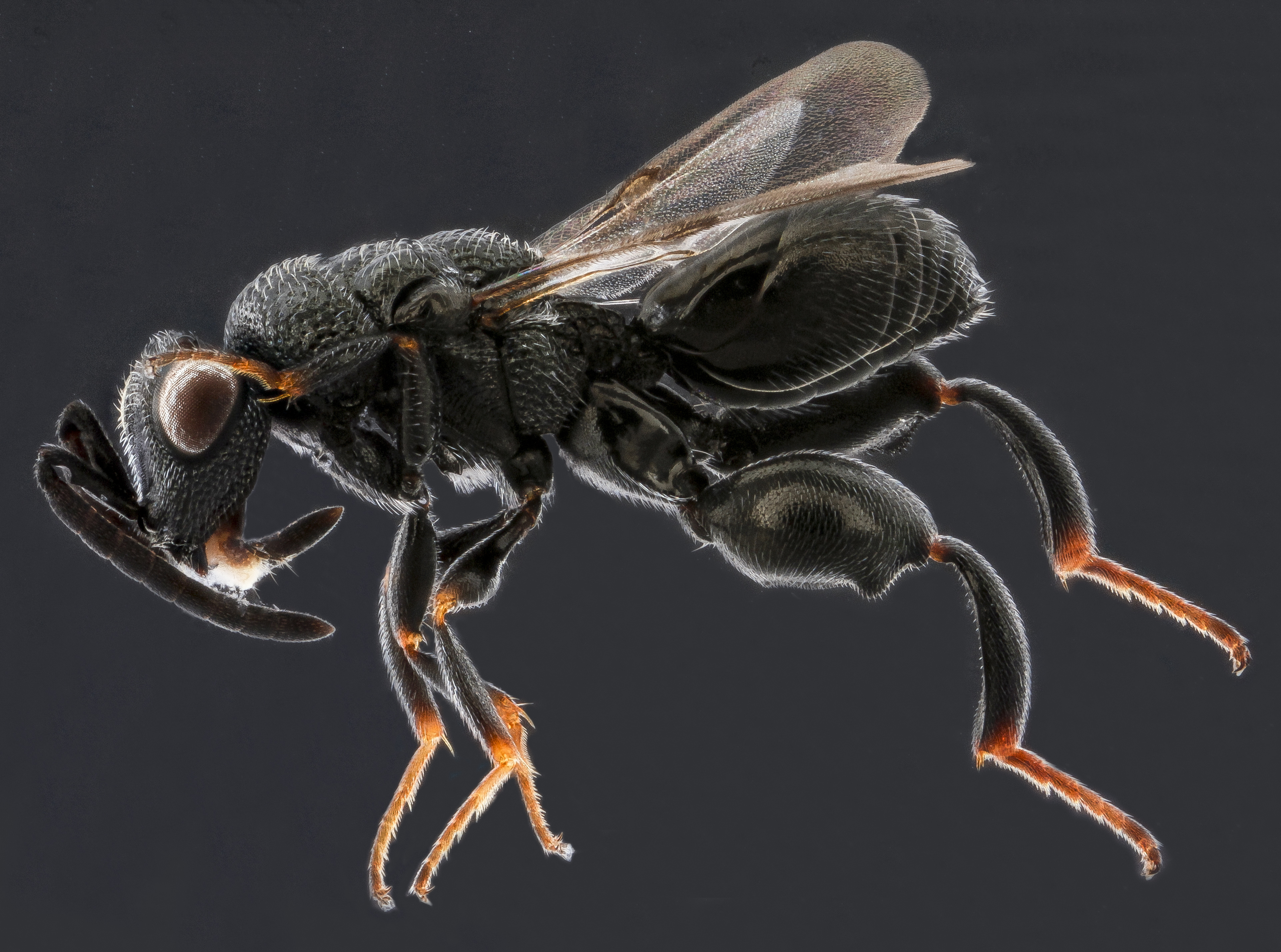
Psilochalcis

== Genera ==
These genera belong to the subfamily Haltichellinae:

- Allochalcis Kieffer, 1905^{c g}
- Anachalcis Steffan, 1951^{c g}
- Antrocephalus Kirby, 1883^{c g}
- Aphasganophora Nikol'skaya, 1952^{c g}
- Belaspidia Masi, 1916^{c g}
- Chirocera Latreille, 1825^{c g}
- Euchalcis Dufour, 1861^{c g}
- Haltichella Spinola, 1811^{c g b}
- Hockeria Walker, 1834^{c g b}
- Hybothorax Ratzeburg, 1844^{c g}
- Irichohalticella Cameron, 1912^{c g}
- Kriechbaumerella Dalla Torre, 1897^{c g}
- Lasiochalcidia Masi, 1929^{c g}
- Nearretocera Girault, 1913^{c g}
- Neochalcis Kirby, 1883^{c g}
- Neohybothorax Nikolskaja, 1960^{c g}
- Neostomatoceras Girault, 1920^{c g}
- Nipponochalcidia Habu, 1976^{c g}
- Proconura Dodd, 1915^{c g}
- Psilochalcis Kieffer, 1905^{c g b}
- Schwarzella Ashmead, 1904^{c g b}
- Steninvreia Boucek, 1988^{c g}
- Tanycoryphus Cameron, 1905^{c g}
- Trichoxenia Kirby, 1883^{c g}
- Uga Girault, 1930^{c g}
- Xenarretocera

Girault, 1926^{c g}Data sources: i = ITIS, c = Catalogue of Life, g = GBIF, b = Bugguide.net
