= Lineodes serpulalis =

Scientific classification
- Kingdom: Animalia
- Phylum: Arthropoda
- Class: Insecta
- Order: Lepidoptera
- Family: Crambidae
- Genus: Lineodes
- Species: L. serpulalis

Binomial name
- Lineodes serpulalis Lederer, 1863

Synonyms
- Lineodes peridialis Walker, 1859

Species of moth

Lineodes serpulalis is a moth in the family Crambidae. It was described by Julius Lederer in 1863. It is found in Brazil.
