= Lineodes multisignalis =

Scientific classification
- Kingdom: Animalia
- Phylum: Arthropoda
- Class: Insecta
- Order: Lepidoptera
- Family: Crambidae
- Genus: Lineodes
- Species: L. multisignalis

Binomial name
- Lineodes multisignalis Herrich-Schäffer, 1868

Species of moth

Lineodes multisignalis is a moth in the family Crambidae. It was described by Gottlieb August Wilhelm Herrich-Schäffer in 1868. It is found almost entirely in Cuba; however, one was identified in Florida in 2014. The species can be identified against others in the Lineodes genus by the absence of a yellow dash on the far-edge of its frontal wings and by presence of a dark spot and contrasting shades on its back wings.
