= Lineodes pulcherrima =

Scientific classification
- Kingdom: Animalia
- Phylum: Arthropoda
- Class: Insecta
- Order: Lepidoptera
- Family: Crambidae
- Genus: Lineodes
- Species: L. pulcherrima

Binomial name
- Lineodes pulcherrima E. Hering, 1906

Species of moth

Lineodes pulcherrima is a moth in the family Crambidae. It was described by E. Hering in 1906. It is found in Peru.
