= Conura side =

Scientific classification
- Kingdom: Animalia
- Phylum: Arthropoda
- Class: Insecta
- Order: Hymenoptera
- Family: Chalcididae
- Genus: Conura
- Species: C. side

Binomial name
- Conura side (Walker, 1843)

Synonyms
- Spilochalcis side (Walker, 1843); Smiera flavopicta Cresson, 1865; Spilochalcis flavopicta (Cresson, 1865)

Species of wasp

Conura side is a species of chalcidid wasp in the family Chalcididae. It is a hyperparasitoid of Diadegma insulare.
