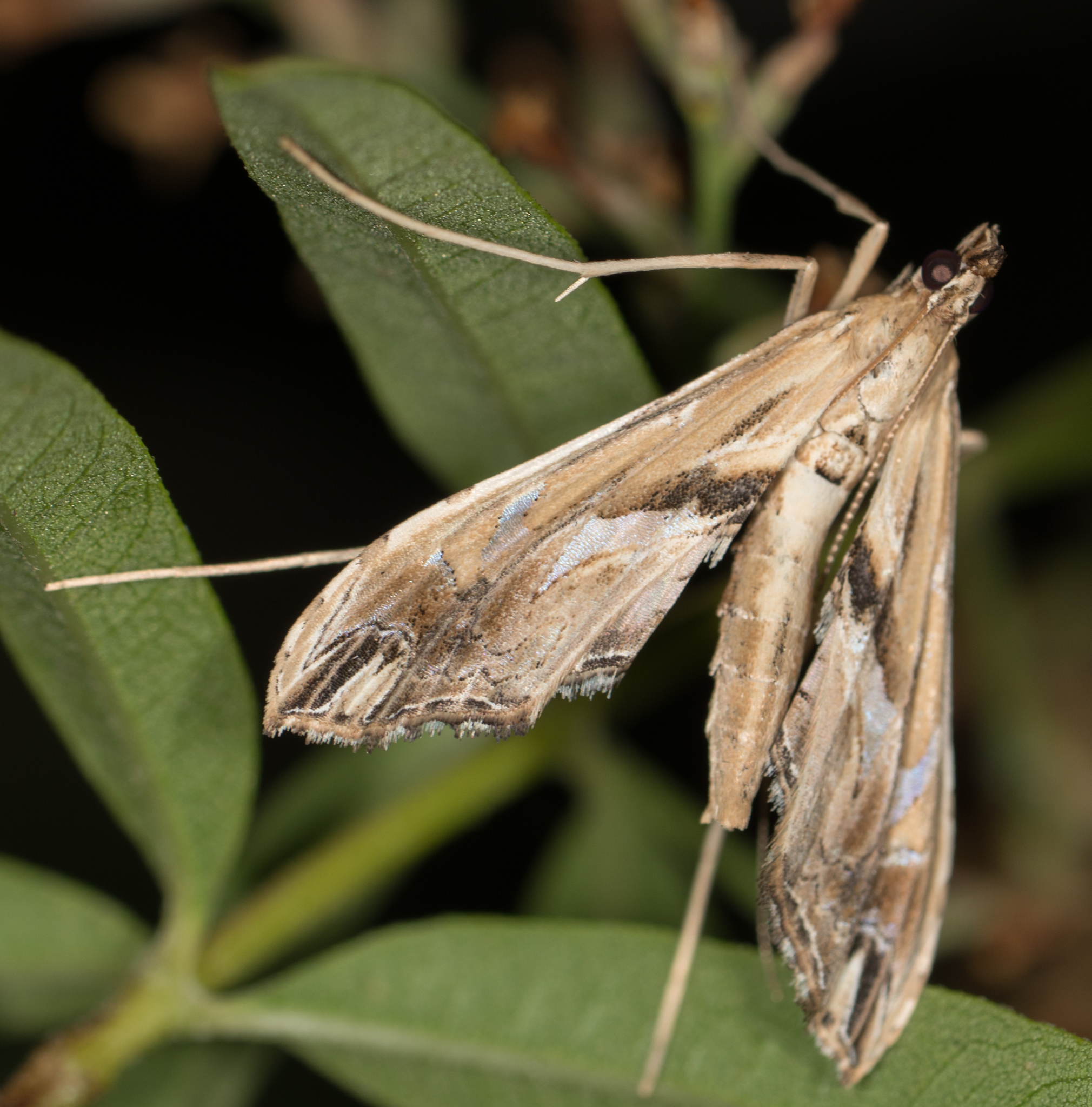

Scientific classification
- Kingdom: Animalia
- Phylum: Arthropoda
- Clade: Pancrustacea
- Class: Insecta
- Order: Lepidoptera
- Family: Crambidae
- Genus: Lineodes
- Species: L. elcodes

Binomial name
- Lineodes elcodes (Dyar, 1910)

Synonyms
- Ciraphorus elcodes Dyar, 1910

= Lineodes elcodes =

Species of moth

Lineodes elcodes is a moth in the family Crambidae. It was described by Harrison Gray Dyar Jr. in 1910. It is found in Mexico and the US state of California.
