= Lineodes tipuloides =

Scientific classification
- Kingdom: Animalia
- Phylum: Arthropoda
- Class: Insecta
- Order: Lepidoptera
- Family: Crambidae
- Genus: Lineodes
- Species: L. tipuloides

Binomial name
- Lineodes tipuloides Walsingham, 1891

Species of moth

Lineodes tipuloides is a moth in the family Crambidae. It was described by Walsingham in 1891. It is found in Trinidad.
