= Lineodes polychroalis =

Scientific classification
- Kingdom: Animalia
- Phylum: Arthropoda
- Clade: Pancrustacea
- Class: Insecta
- Order: Lepidoptera
- Family: Crambidae
- Genus: Lineodes
- Species: L. polychroalis

Binomial name
- Lineodes polychroalis Hampson, 1913

Species of moth

Lineodes polychroalis is a moth in the family Crambidae. It was described by George Hampson in 1913. It is found in Peru.
