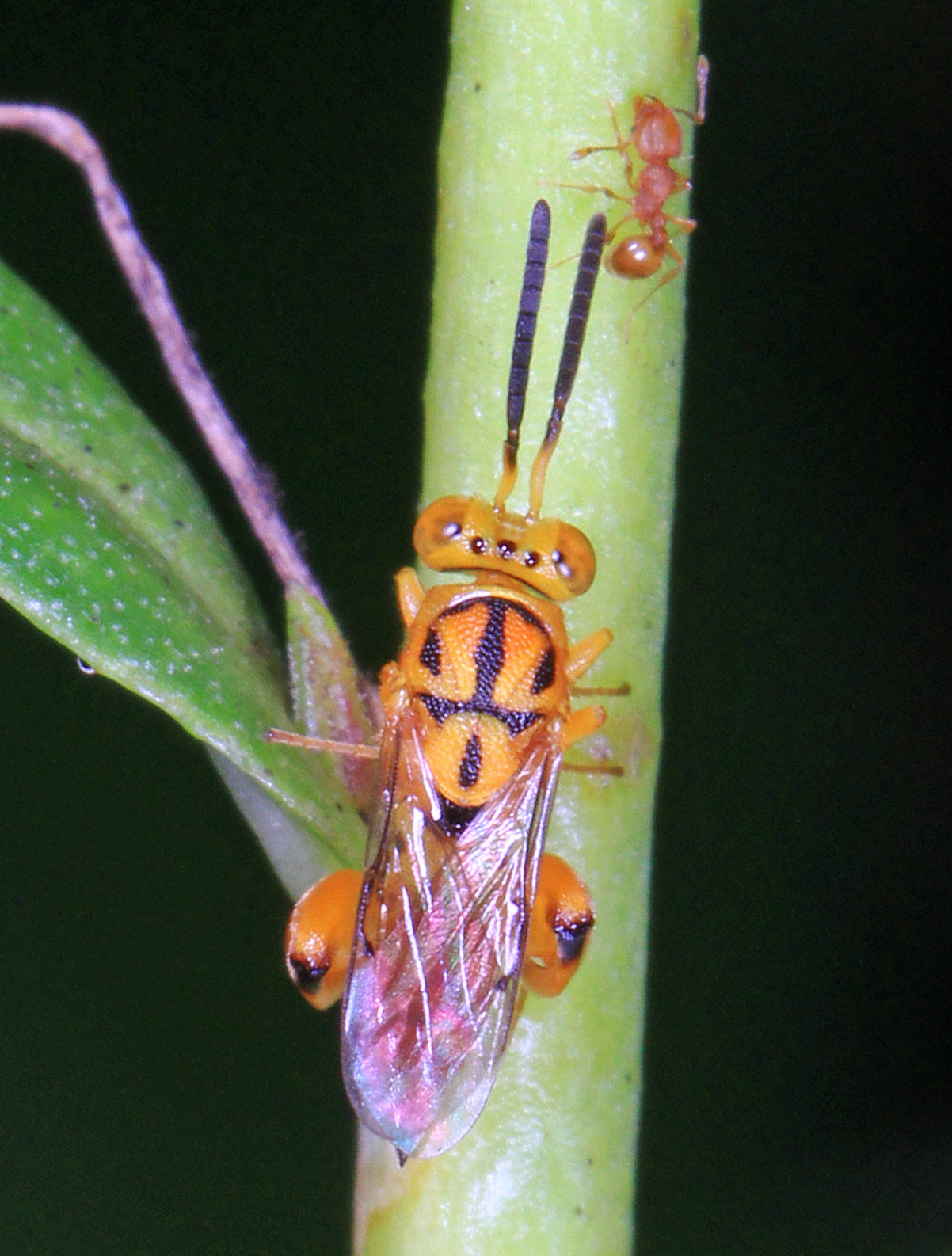
- Conura sp. in Florida

Scientific classification
- Domain: Eukaryota
- Kingdom: Animalia
- Phylum: Arthropoda
- Class: Insecta
- Order: Hymenoptera
- Family: Chalcididae
- Subfamily: Chalcidinae

= Chalcidinae =

Subfamily of wasps

Chalcidinae is a subfamily of chalcidid wasps in the family Chalcididae.

== Taxonomy and phylogeny ==
Phylogenetic analysis has restricted Chalcidinae to only encompass those genera formerly included in the tribe Chalcidini, with the former tribes Brachymeriini and Phasgonophorini being elevated to subfamily status as Brachymeriinae and Phasgonophorinae, respectively.

== Genera ==
There are 7 genera belonging to the subfamily Chalcidinae:

- Chalcis Fabricius, 1787
- Conura Spinola, 1837
- Corumbichalcis Delvare, 1992
- Hovachalcis Steffan, 1949
- Melanosmicra Ashmead, 1904
- Pilismicra Bouček, 1992
- Stenosmicra Bouček & Delvare, 1992
