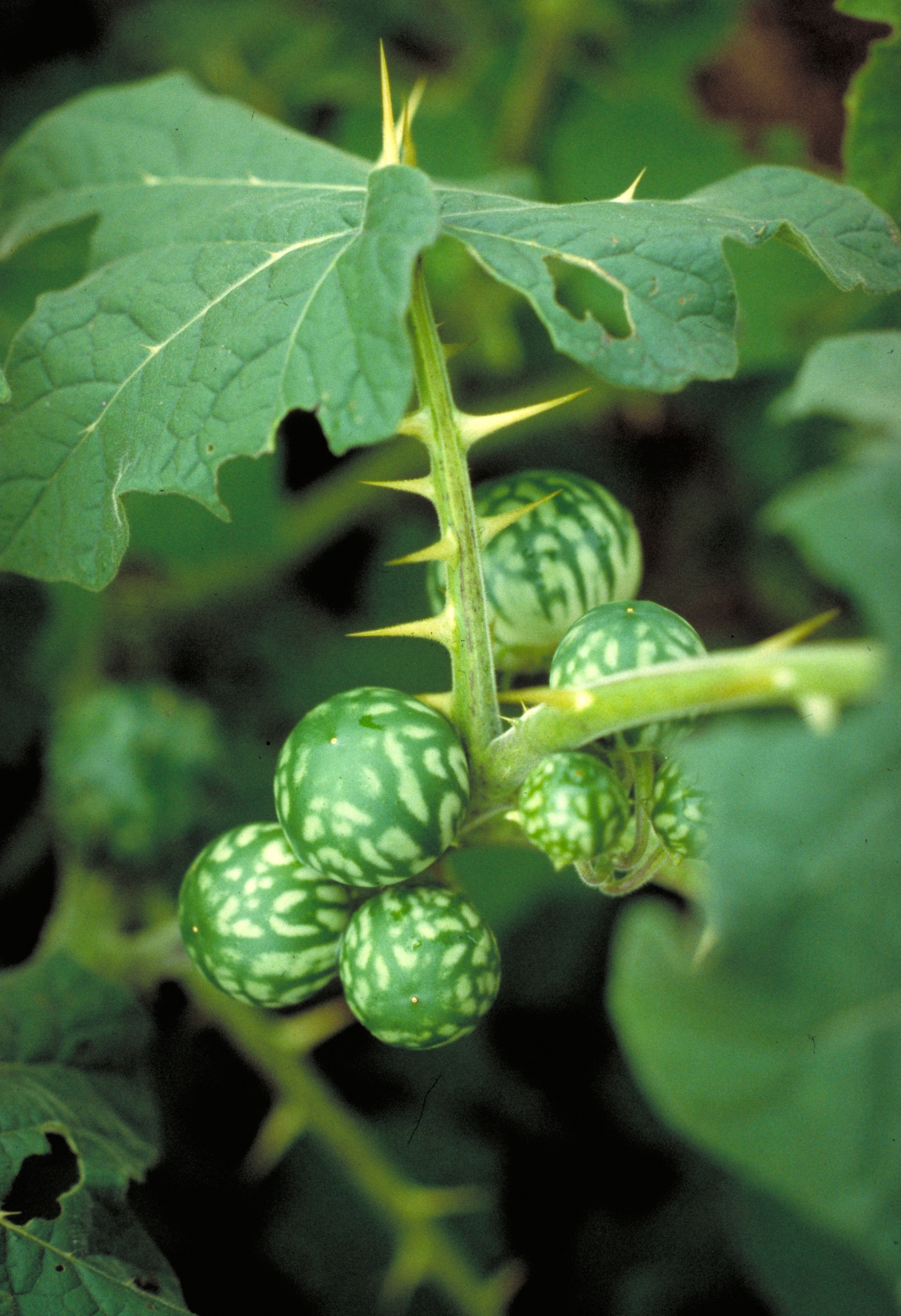
- Fruit

Scientific classification
- Kingdom: Plantae
- Clade: Tracheophytes
- Clade: Angiosperms
- Clade: Eudicots
- Clade: Asterids
- Order: Solanales
- Family: Solanaceae
- Genus: Solanum
- Species: S. viarum

Binomial name
- Solanum viarum Dunal

Synonyms
- See text

= Solanum viarum =

Species of shrub

Solanum viarum, the tropical soda apple, is a species of perennial shrub native to Brazil and Argentina with a prickly stem and prickly leaves. The fruit is golf-ball-sized with the coloration of a watermelon. It is considered an invasive species in the lower eastern coastal states of the United States and more recently in New South Wales and Queensland in Australia (first being spotted on the Mid North Coast in 2010).

== Synonyms ==
This species has several synonyms, one of which is particularly ambiguous:

- Solanum chloranthum DC.

S. chloranthum as described by Poeppig based on Otto Sendtner in von Martius is now S. velutinum
S. chloranthum as described by Philipp Salzmann based on Dunal in de Candolle is now S. agrarium
S. chloranthum as described by C.P.J. Sprengel is now S. arenarium as described by Otto Sendtner

- Solanum khasianum var. chatterjeeanum Sengupta & Sengupta

S. khasianum proper is now S. aculeatissimum as described by Nikolaus Joseph von Jacquin.

- Solanum viridiflorum Schltdl.

Not to be confused with S. acuminatum var. viridiflorum, which is now S. caavurana.

== Introduction and control ==
The tropical soda apple is native to northeastern Argentina, southeastern Brazil, Paraguay and Uruguay, having since naturalised in other parts of South America. However, the plant has been introduced to several other parts of the world, including parts of Africa, Honduras, India, Mexico, Nepal, the West Indies and (most notably) the Australian states of New South Wales and Queensland, and parts of the United States.

=== Australia ===
The tropical soda apple was first discovered in Australia in August 2010, in the upper Macleay Valley on the Mid North Coast of New South Wales. It has since become a prolific pest species on the Mid North Coast, with heavy infestations in particular being found along the Clarence and Macleay Rivers. In New South Wales, infestations also exist in the Hunter, Northern Rivers and Northern Tablelands regions. Small isolated infestations also exist in Queensland, where it was first detected in November 2010 near the town of Coominya in South East Queensland.

Control programs are underway in New South Wales and Queensland in an effort to eradicate the plant. It is an offence to import or sell the plant in New South Wales, while it is classed as a "prohibited invasive plant" in Queensland under the Biosecurity Act 2014.

=== United States ===
The tropical soda apple was first discovered in the United States in 1988, having probably been introduced through contaminated seed or other agricultural products. It crowds out native species and forage for livestock. Its habitat is terrestrial, in fields, rights-of-way, and open forest. It is spread by livestock and wildlife, such as raccoons, deer, feral hogs, and birds feeding on fruits.

It is classified as a noxious weed or plant in Alabama, Florida, Mississippi, North Carolina, Texas, and Vermont, and in California and Oregon it is a quarantine pest. It is a prohibited noxious weed in Arizona and Minnesota; prohibited in Massachusetts; and a plant pest in South Carolina and Tennessee. It is also listed as a tier 1 noxious weed in Virginia, along with giant hogweed.

Since its introduction into the U.S., tropical soda apple has spread rapidly, and currently infests an estimated one million acres of improved pastures, citrus groves, sugarcane fields, ditches, vegetable crops, sod farms, forestlands (oak hammocks and cypress heads), natural areas, etc. in Alabama, Florida, Georgia, and Mississippi. Although it can be a threat to a variety of habitat, it tends to be most problematic in pastures in the Mid South.

It is controlled by triclopyr herbicide. Gratiana boliviana, the tropical soda apple leaf beetle, has been used successfully as an agent of biological pest control to reduce the abundance of this plant in the United States, particularly in Florida.

== Flowering ==
The mature fruits are smooth, round, yellow and ¾ to 1¼ inches in diameter with a leathery-skin surrounding a thin-layered, pale green, scented pulp and 180 to 420 flattened, reddish brown seeds. Each plant is capable of producing 200 or more fruit per year. Tropical Soda Apple (Solanum viarum) usually grows to 3–6 ft tall.
