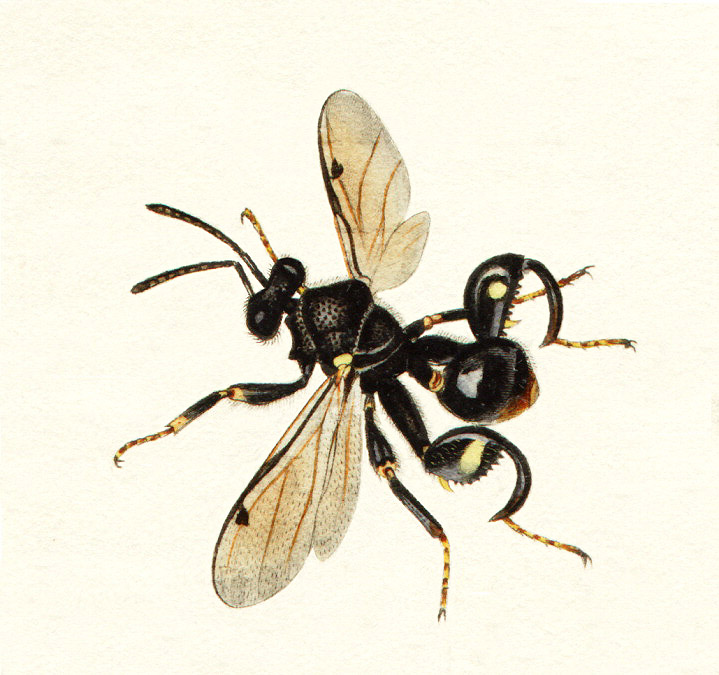
- Chalcis biguttata (Spinola, 1808)

Scientific classification
- Kingdom: Animalia
- Phylum: Arthropoda
- Clade: Pancrustacea
- Class: Insecta
- Order: Hymenoptera
- Superfamily: Chalcidoidea
- Family: Chalcididae; Latreille, 1817

Subfamilies
- Brachymeriinae; Chalcidinae; Cratocentrinae; Dirhininae; Epitraninae; Haltichellinae; Phasgonophorinae; Smicromorphinae

Diversity
- 8 subfamilies c.85 genera c.1455 species

= Chalcididae =

Family of insects

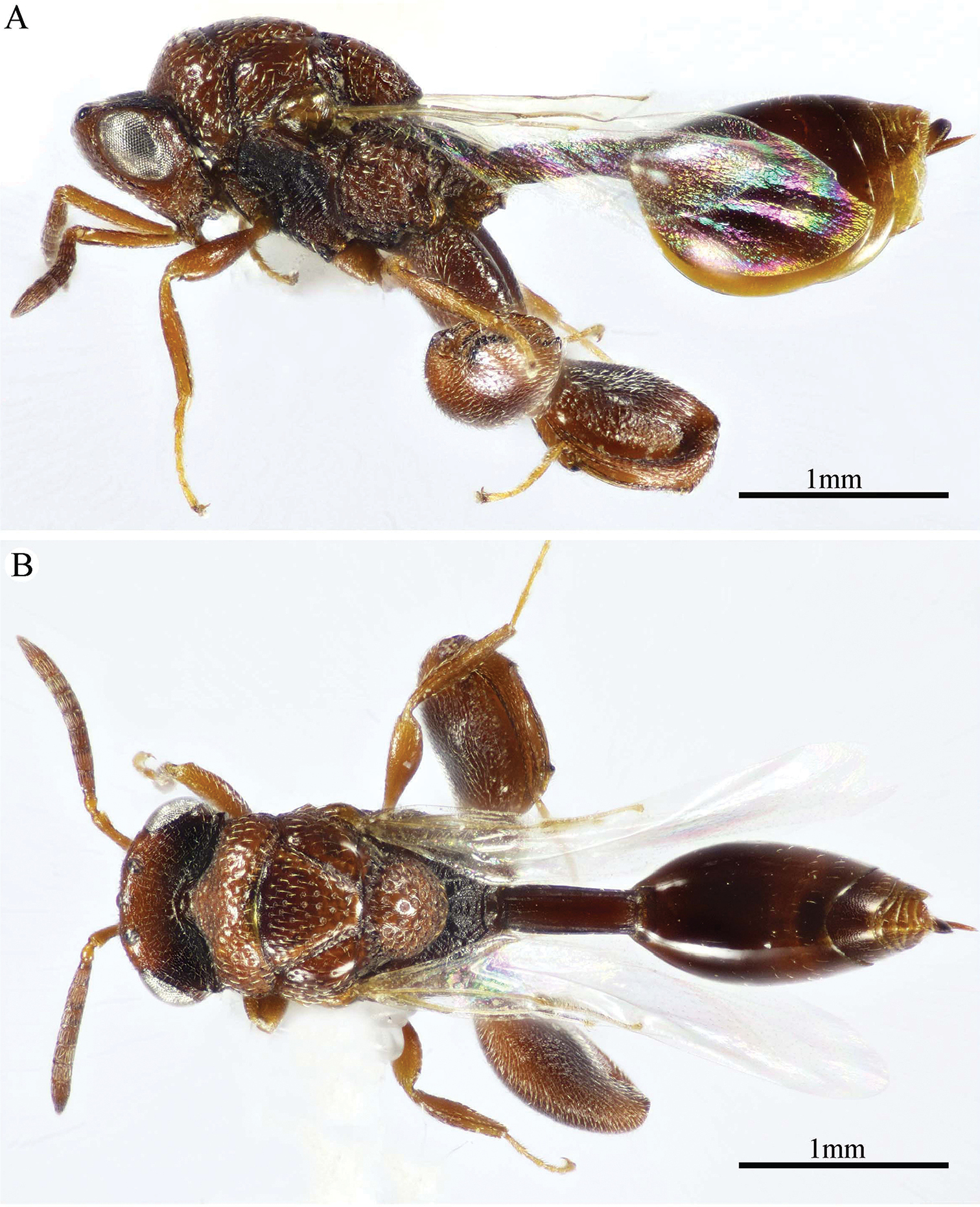
Epitranus clavatus

The Chalcididae are a moderate-sized family within the Chalcidoidea, composed mostly of parasitoids and a few hyperparasitoids. The family is apparently polyphyletic, though the different subfamilies may each be monophyletic, and some may be elevated to family status in the near future. As presently defined, there are over 85 genera and over 1460 species worldwide. They are often black with yellow, red, or white markings, rarely brilliantly metallic, with a robust mesosoma and very strong sculpturing. The hind femora are often greatly enlarged, with a row of teeth or serrations along the lower margin.

One of the more remarkable uses of the muscular hind legs is the species Lasiochalcidia igiliensis, which attacks the predatory larvae of ant lions, holding the mandibles of the larva spread apart while the wasp injects an egg into the membrane of the exposed throat.
