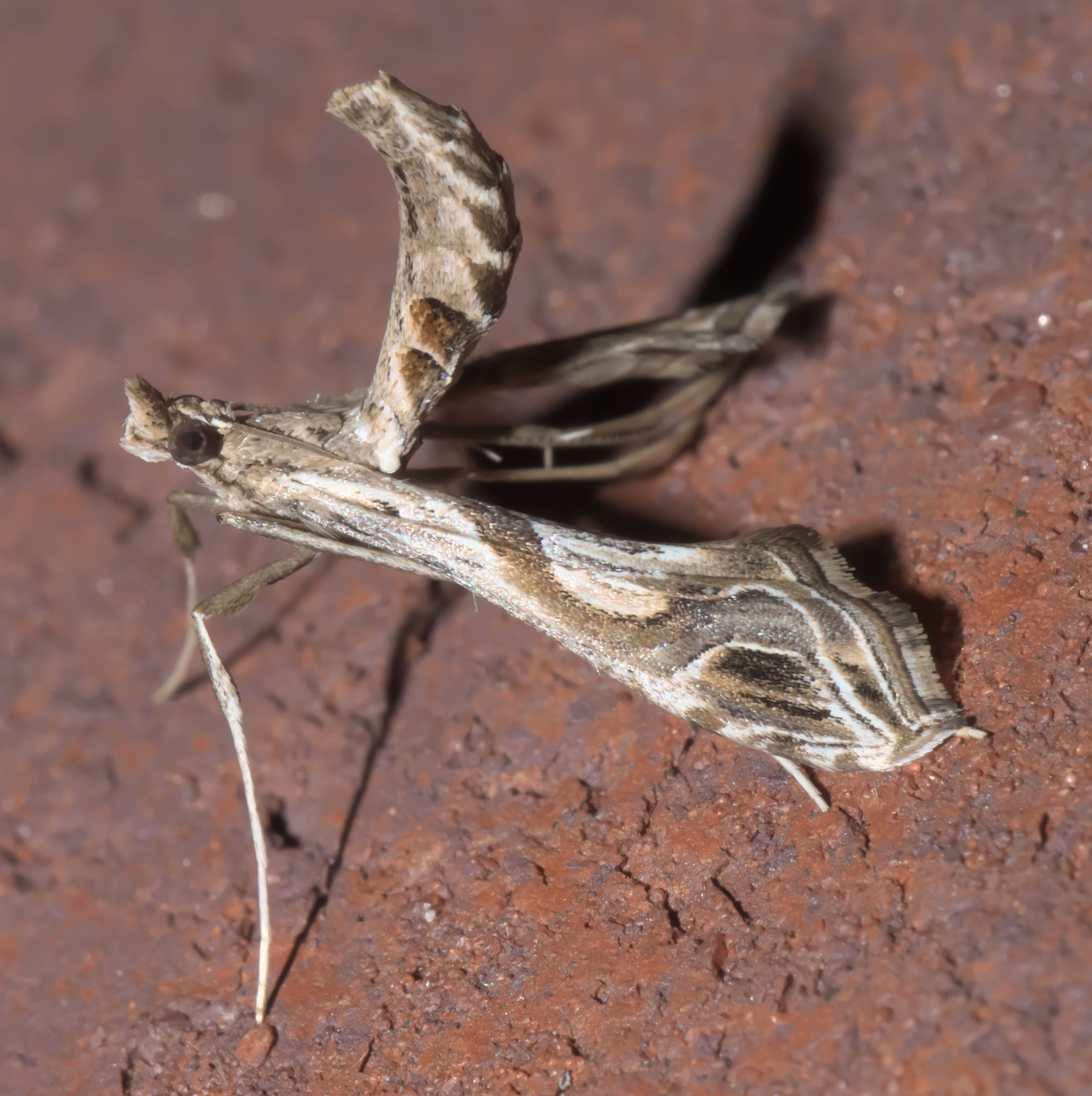
- Lineodes integra, adult with abdomen bent over the head

Scientific classification
- Kingdom: Animalia
- Phylum: Arthropoda
- Clade: Pancrustacea
- Class: Insecta
- Order: Lepidoptera
- Family: Crambidae
- Subfamily: Spilomelinae
- Tribe: Lineodini; Amsel, 1956

Genera
- Atomopteryx; Euleucinodes; Leucinodes; Lineodes; Neoleucinodes; Proleucinodes; Rhectosemia

= Lineodini =

Tribe of moths

Lineodini is a tribe of the species-rich subfamily Spilomelinae in the snout moth family Crambidae.

== Description ==
Lineodini comprise medium-sized moths, mostly with moderately broad wings, whereas in the slender, long-legged Atomopteryx and Lineodes, the wings are narrow and almost pterophorid-like. Females exhibit only one frenular bristle on the hind wing base, with the exception of Rhectosemia, where two frenular bristles are present.

The sacci tympani of the tympanal organ are ventrally open.

In the male genitalia, the valvae are of variable shape, from very slender to relatively broad and triangular with a broad valva base or paddle-shaped with a narrow valva base. The valva apex is rounded to somewhat acute. The costa is straight to concave, as in other non-euspilomeline species. The fibula is variable in shape, being either slender and emerging from the costa base or shorter and emerging more from the centre of the valva; in Euleucinodes and Proleucinodes, the fibula is absent. The valva sacculus is usually simple, whereas in Leucinodes there is a distal sacculus process that is in close association with the fibula. The posterior phallus is simple and unmodified or with sclerotized appendages.

In the female genitalia, the ductus bursae is normally unsclerotized – a synapomorphy of Lineodini. However, in Leucinodes and Neoleucinodes the posterior ductus bursae, the colliculum and the antrum are often partially sclerotized often have a thickened mesocuticle. The corpus bursae is membranous, but at least Rhectosemia antofagastalis and R. striata exhibit a small sclerotized signum.

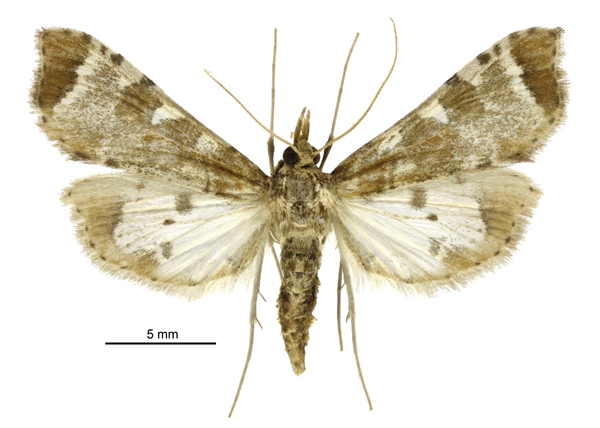
Leucinodes cordalis, adult female

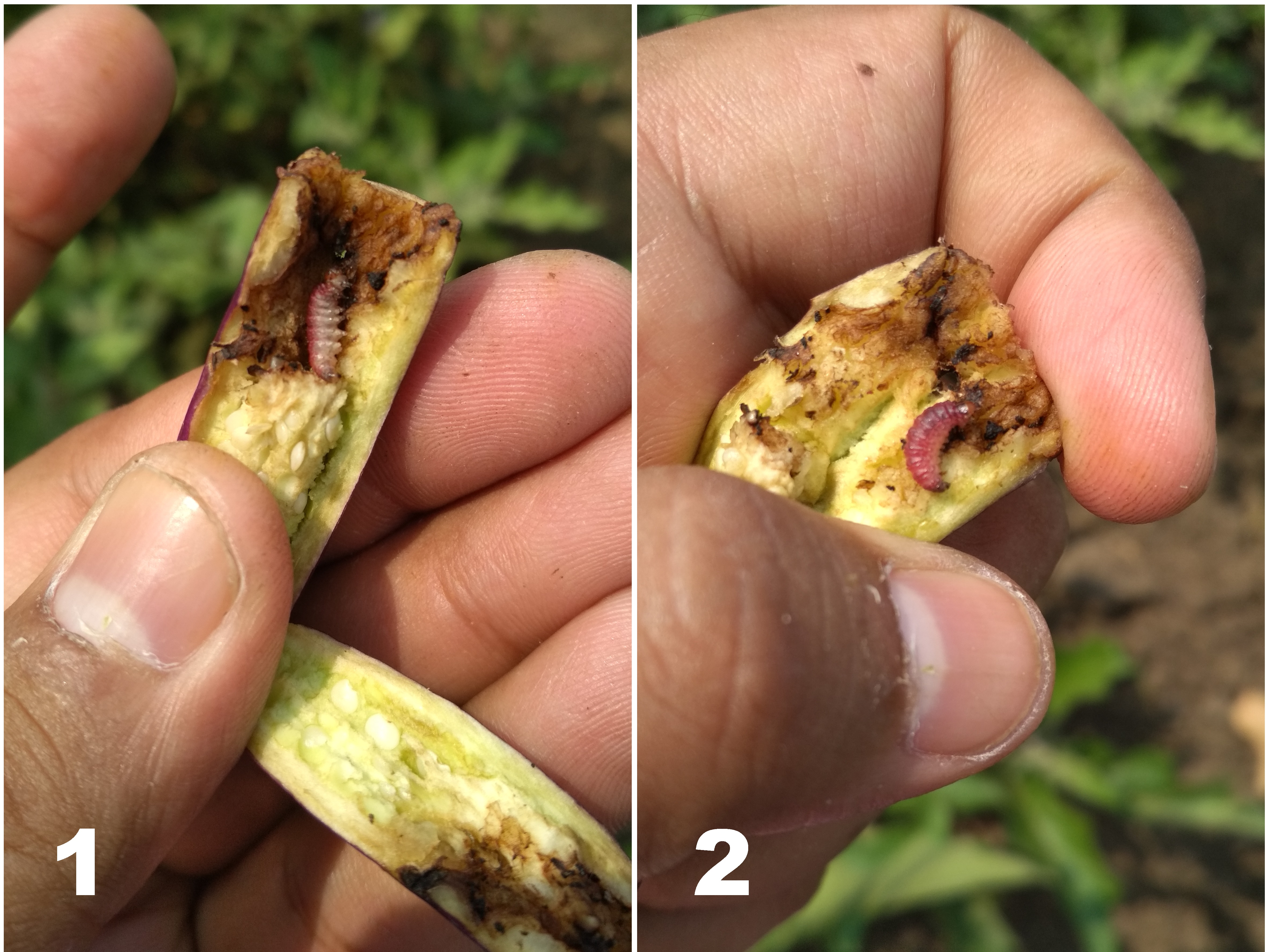
Leucinodes orbonalis caterpillar feeding inside an eggplant fruit

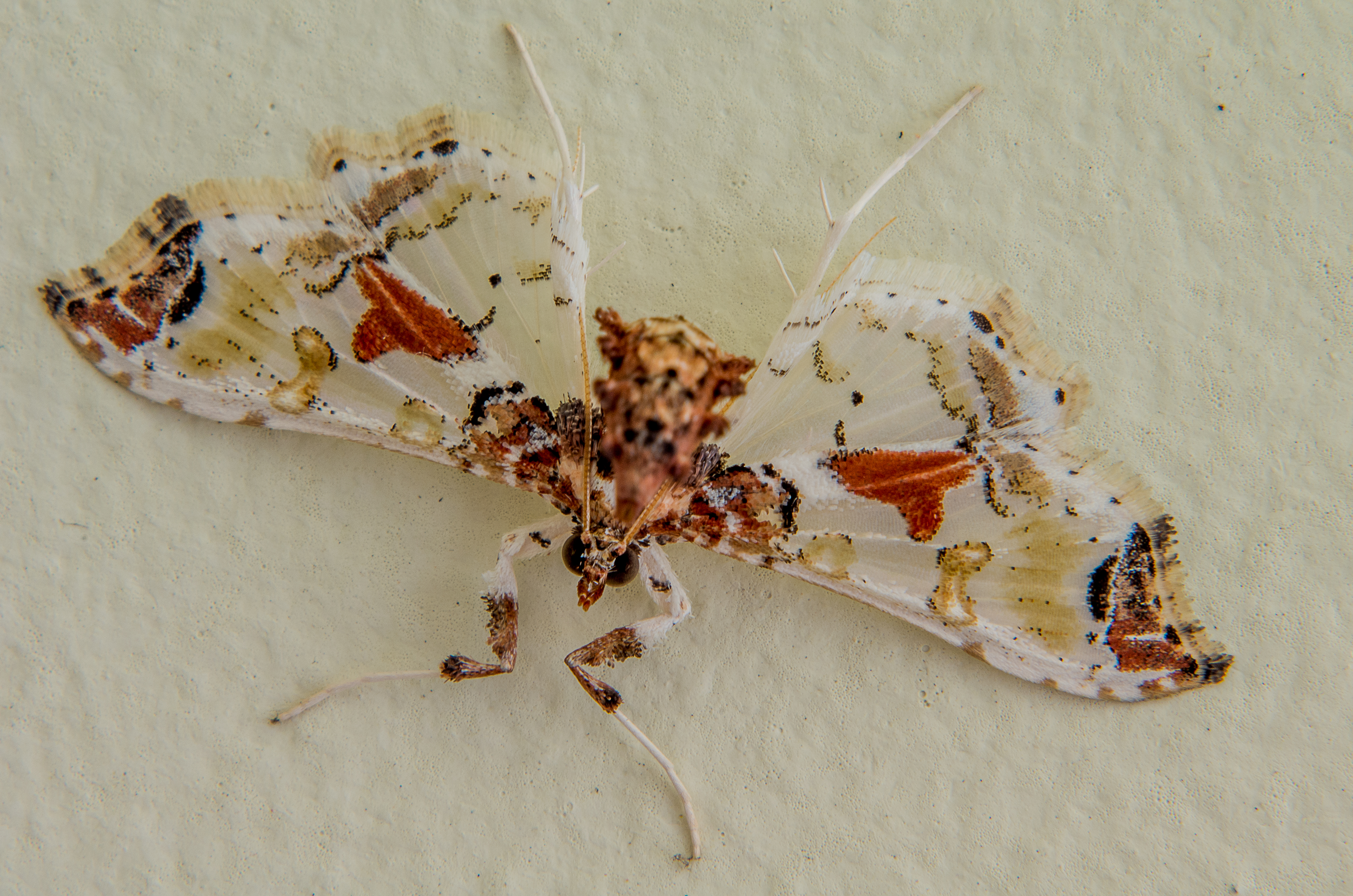
Neoleucinodes elegantalis, adult with abdomen bent over the head

== Food plants ==
As far as known, Lineodini feed exclusively on Solanaceae plants like tomato, eggplant, potato, Capsicum (pepper), Physalis and numerous others. The caterpillars tie leaves together or bore in the plant, especially in fruits, by which they diminish or ruin the marketable value of the fruits.

== Distribution ==
Except for the Old World Leucinodes, all Lineodini have a Neotropical to temperate Nearctic distribution.

Species feeding on globally traded Solanaceae fruits are frequently transported by accident through fruits occupied by larvae. In Europe, the Asian Leucinodes orbonalis as well as the Afrotropical L. africensis, L. pseudorbonalis and L. rimavallis are frequently intercepted at ports of entry.

== Systematics ==
The tribe Lineodini was proposed in 1956 by Hans Georg Amsel in his "Microlepidoptera Venezolana" monography. He erected the tribe for the genus Lineodes for its outstanding habitus, genitalia and wing venation, and further included Stenoptycha in the group, which is now considered a synonym of Atomopteryx. The proposed tribe did not gain much acceptance and was considered a synonym of Pyraustinae, and later of Spilomelinae, a split-off of Pyraustinae, mostly due to a lack of a comprehensive understanding of the evolutionary relationships among the very species-rich Spilomelinae. Lineodini in its current circumscription was mentioned by Hayden et al. (2013) as "Leucinodes genus group", and was reinstated as tribe in 2019.

Capps (1948) split off three Neotropical genera from the Old World Leucinodes: Euleucinodes, Neoleucinodes and Proleucinodes.

Seven genera, altogether comprising 94 species, are currently placed in Lineodini:

- Atomopteryx Walsingham, 1891 (synonyms Zellerina Torre & Callejas, 1958, Stenoptycha Zeller, 1863)
- Euleucinodes Capps, 1948
- Leucinodes Guenée, 1854 (synonyms Hyperanalyta Strand, 1918, Sceliodes Guenée, 1854; misspelling Leuctinodes South, 1897)
- Lineodes Guenée, 1854 (synonyms Ciraphorus Dyar, 1910, Scoptonoma Zeller, 1873)
- Neoleucinodes Capps, 1948
- Proleucinodes Capps, 1948
- Rhectosemia Lederer, 1863 (misspelling Rhectosomia Lederer, 1863)
