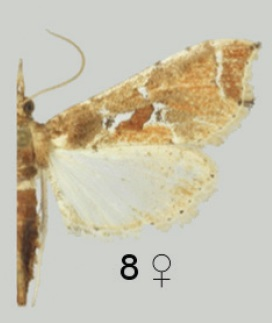
- Female, brownish form
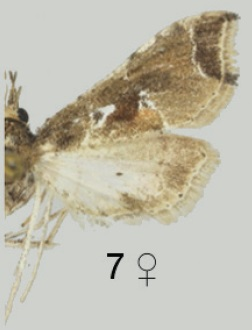
- Female, grey form

Scientific classification
- Kingdom: Animalia
- Phylum: Arthropoda
- Clade: Pancrustacea
- Class: Insecta
- Order: Lepidoptera
- Family: Crambidae
- Genus: Leucinodes
- Species: L. laisalis

Binomial name
- Leucinodes laisalis (Walker, 1859)

Synonyms
- Megaphysa laisalis Walker, 1859; Sceliodes laisalis; Daraba laisalis; Daraba idmonealis Walker, 1859; Hyamia subterminalis Walker, 1866; Leucinodes translucidalis Gaede, 1917; Sceliodes translucidalis

= Leucinodes laisalis =

Species of moth

Leucinodes laisalis is a species of moth in the family Crambidae. It was described as Megaphysa laisalis by Francis Walker based on material collected in the Cape Province of South Africa.

The wingspan is 20–34 mm. The species exhibits sexual dimorphism, with females being somewhat larger. The forewing ground colour ranges from orange to grey brown.

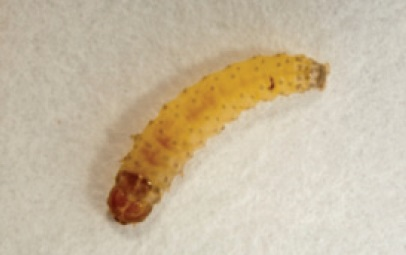
Early-instar larva

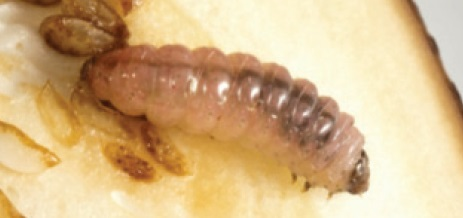
Late-instar larva

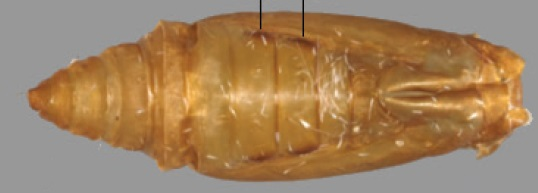
Pupa

== Distribution ==
It is mainly distributed in Africa, where it is known from the Democratic Republic of the Congo, Eritrea, Ethiopia, the Gambia, Ghana, Israel, Ivory Coast, Kenya, Morocco, Mozambique, Niger, Nigeria, Oman, Réunion, Saudi Arabia, Senegal, Somalia, South Africa, Tanzania and Zimbabwe. It has also been recorded from Belgium, the Czech Republic, Spain, Portugal and the United Kingdom, which probably do not represent native occurrences of the species but rather unintentional introductions along with imports of eggplants, tomatoes and other Solanaceae, the species' host plants. In southern Spain, the species is established since at least 1958 and has extended its range to Portugal, with a spread rate of 5.51–11.51 km/year.

== Larval food plants ==
Like all species of the tribe Lineodini, the larvae of L. laisalis exclusively feed on the fruits of Solanaceae. Their recorded host plants are Solanum anguivi, Solanum incanum, Solanum linnaeanum, Solanum macrocarpon, Solanum melongena, Lycopersicon esculentum and Capsicum annuum.
