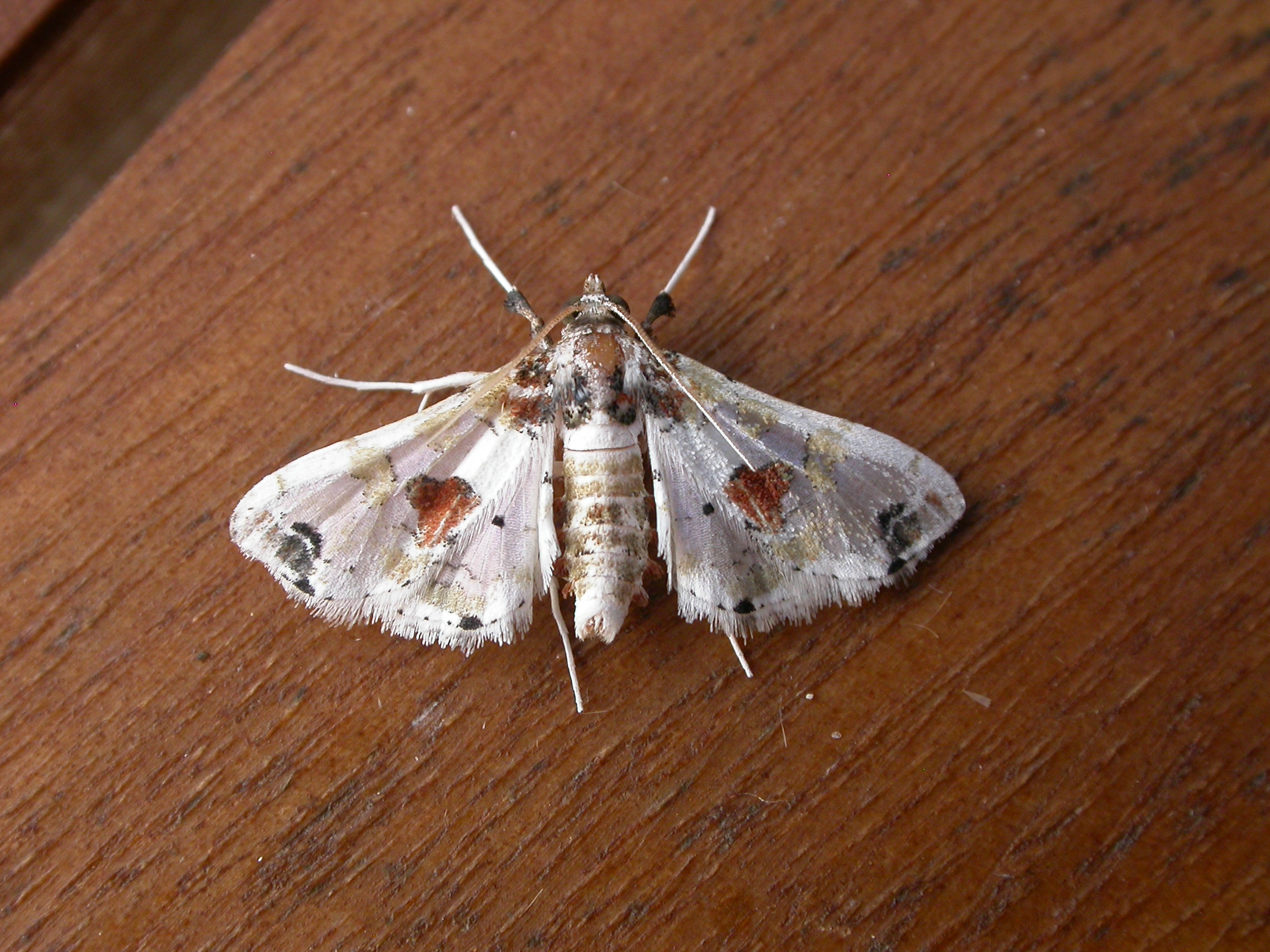

Scientific classification
- Kingdom: Animalia
- Phylum: Arthropoda
- Class: Insecta
- Order: Lepidoptera
- Family: Crambidae
- Tribe: Lineodini
- Genus: Leucinodes; Guenée, 1854

Synonyms
- Sceliodes Guenée, 1854; Daraba Walker, 1859; Eretria Snellen, 1880; Leuctinodes South, 1897 (misspelling)

= Leucinodes =

Genus of moths

Leucinodes is a genus of moths of the family Crambidae. It was first described by Achille Guenée in 1854.

Leucinodes species have been documented as eggplant fruit borers. They are occasionally imported by accident from African and Asian countries to North America and Europe and pose medium threats to Solanaceae crops.

== Species ==
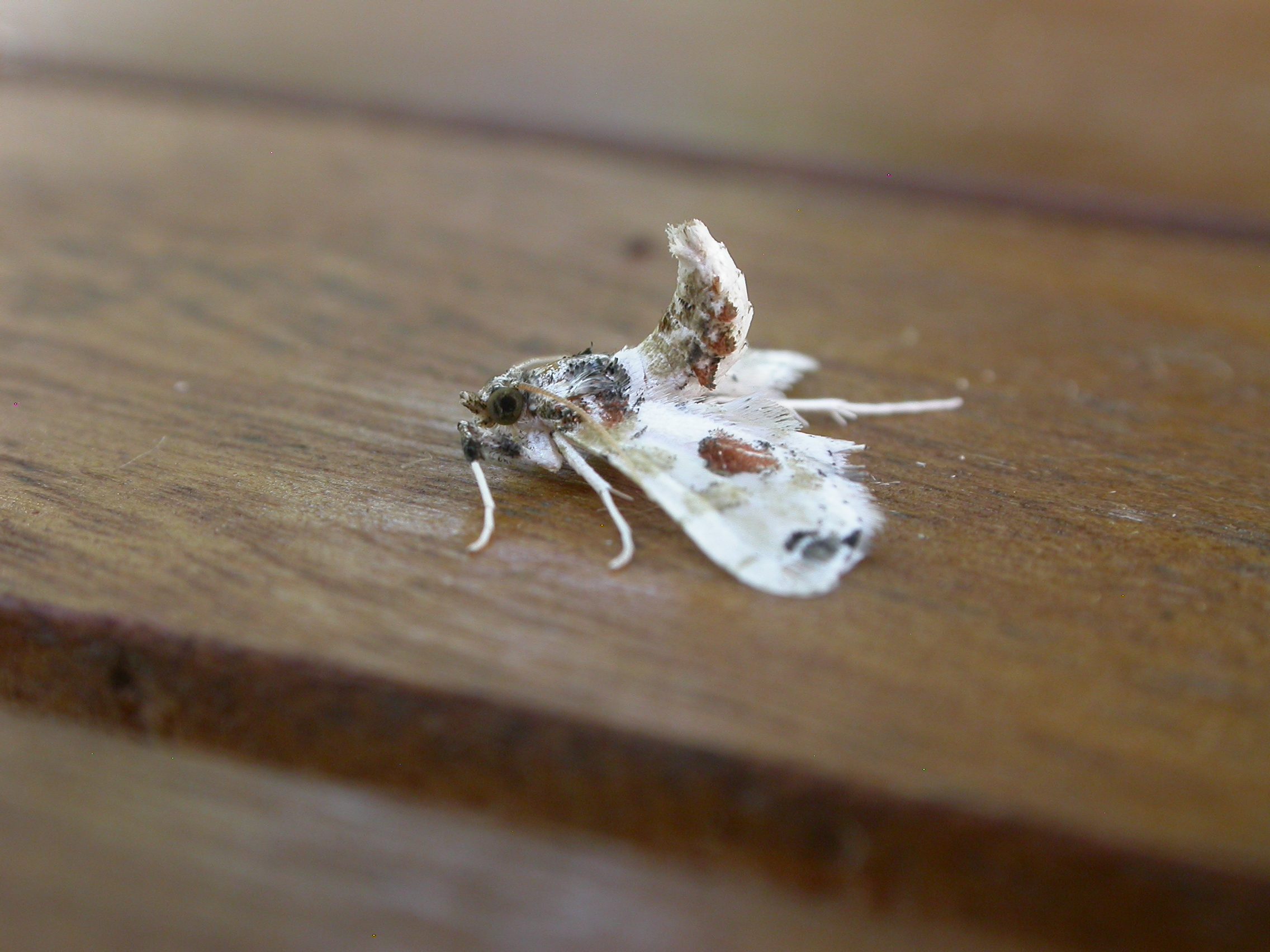
Leucinodes orbonalis, imago

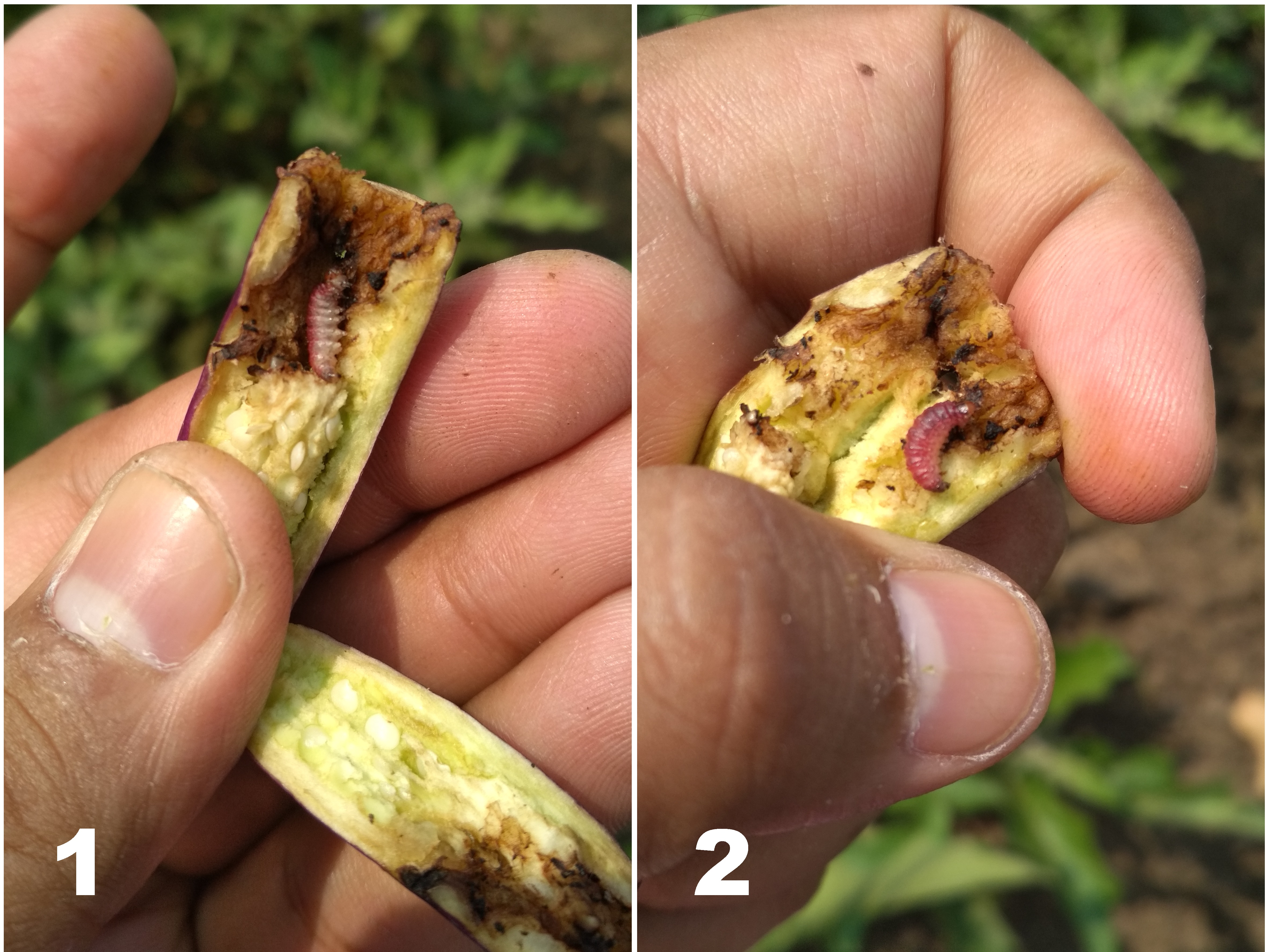
Leucinodes orbonalis, caterpillar feeding in an eggplant fruit

- Leucinodes africensis Mally et al., 2015
- Leucinodes bilinealis Snellen, 1899
- Leucinodes cordalis (Doubleday, 1843)
- Leucinodes diaphana (Hampson, 1891)
- Leucinodes erosialis Pagenstecher, 1884
- Leucinodes ethiopica Mally et al., 2015
- Leucinodes grisealis (Kenrick, 1912)
- Leucinodes kenyensis Mally et al., 2015
- Leucinodes labefactalis Swinhoe, 1904
- Leucinodes laisalis (Walker, 1859)
- Leucinodes malawiensis Mally et al., 2015
- Leucinodes melanopalis Guenée, 1854
- Leucinodes orbonalis Guenée, 1854
- Leucinodes perlucidalis Caradja in Caradja & Meyrick, 1933
- Leucinodes pseudorbonalis Mally et al., 2015
- Leucinodes raondry (Viette, 1981)
- Leucinodes rimavallis Mally et al., 2015
- Leucinodes sigulalis Guenée, 1854
- Leucinodes ugandensis Mally et al., 2015
- Leucinodes unilinealis Snellen, 1899

== Former species ==
- Leucinodes apicalis Hampson, 1896, currently placed in Analyta
- Leucinodes aureomarginalis Gaede, 1916, currently placed in Lygropia
- Leucinodes hemichionalis (Mabille, 1900), currently placed in Syllepte
- Leucinodes translucidalis Gaede, 1917, now considered a synonym of Leucinodes laisalis
- Leucinodes vagans (Tutt, 1890), currently placed in Syllepte

== Taxonomy ==
Hyperanalyta Strand, 1918 was formerly treated as a synonym of Leucinodes, but was found to be a synonym of Analyta Lederer, 1863.
