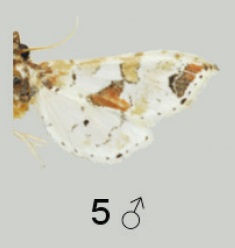

Scientific classification
- Domain: Eukaryota
- Kingdom: Animalia
- Phylum: Arthropoda
- Class: Insecta
- Order: Lepidoptera
- Family: Crambidae
- Genus: Leucinodes
- Species: L. kenyensis

Binomial name
- Leucinodes kenyensis Mally et al., 2015

= Leucinodes kenyensis =

Species of moth

Leucinodes kenyensis is a species of moth in the family Crambidae. It is found in Kenya and possibly Zimbabwe. The species was described by Richard Mally, Anastasia Korycinska, David J. L. Agassiz, Jayne Hall, Jennifer Hodgetts and Matthias Nuss in 2015.

The length of the forewings is about 9 mm for both males and females. The wing pattern is as in Leucinodes orbonalis.

The larvae feed on Withania somnifera.

== Etymology ==
The species is named after Kenya, the only country from where it is confidently recorded so far.
