= Euleucinodes =

Scientific classification
- Kingdom: Animalia
- Phylum: Arthropoda
- Class: Insecta
- Order: Lepidoptera
- Family: Crambidae
- Tribe: Lineodini
- Genus: Euleucinodes; Capps, 1948
- Species: E. conifrons

Binomial name
- Euleucinodes conifrons Capps, 1948

Genus of moths

Euleucinodes is a monotypic moth genus of the family Crambidae described by Hahn William Capps in 1948. It contains only one species, Euleucinodes conifrons, described in the same publication, which is found in Peru.
