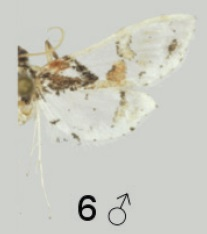

Scientific classification
- Domain: Eukaryota
- Kingdom: Animalia
- Phylum: Arthropoda
- Class: Insecta
- Order: Lepidoptera
- Family: Crambidae
- Genus: Leucinodes
- Species: L. malawiensis

Binomial name
- Leucinodes malawiensis Mally et al., 2015

= Leucinodes malawiensis =

Species of moth

Leucinodes malawiensis is a species of moth in the family Crambidae. It is found in Malawi. The species was described by Richard Mally, Anastasia Korycinska, David J. L. Agassiz, Jayne Hall, Jennifer Hodgetts and Matthias Nuss in 2015.

The length of the forewings is about 8.5 mm for both males and females. The forewings have a dark brown base and the outer margin consists of a straight diagonal line from the costa to the maculation of the central hind margin. There is a triangular patch leading lateroposteriad from the costa with the costal half reddish brown and the central tip white. The outer median area has a faint brownish transverse streak and the subterminal line is indistinct except for a subapical thickening. The hindwing antemedial line is indistinct. There is a dark discal spot and the postmedial line is clear at the costal margin, fading out posteriad. The anterior distal area has a faint brownish transverse streak and the terminal wing veins are dark spotted.

== Etymology ==
The species name refers to the country of Malawi, where the holotype originates.
