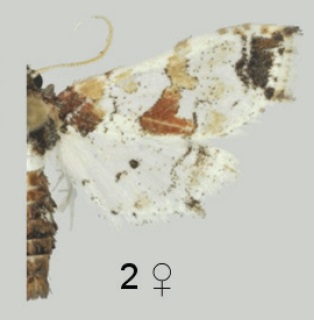
- Female

Scientific classification
- Domain: Eukaryota
- Kingdom: Animalia
- Phylum: Arthropoda
- Class: Insecta
- Order: Lepidoptera
- Family: Crambidae
- Genus: Leucinodes
- Species: L. africensis

Binomial name
- Leucinodes africensis Mally et al., 2015

= Leucinodes africensis =

Species of moth

Leucinodes africensis is a species of moth in the family Crambidae. It is found in West Africa (Ivory Coast, Ghana, Liberia, Nigeria), Angola, the Democratic Republic of the Congo, Gabon and Tanzania. It has been intercepted with plant imports from Ghana and Zimbabwe to Great Britain and the Netherlands. The species was described by Richard Mally, Anastasia Korycinska, David J. L. Agassiz, Jayne Hall, Jennifer Hodgetts and Matthias Nuss in 2015.

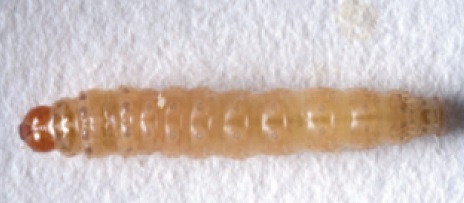
Mid instar larva

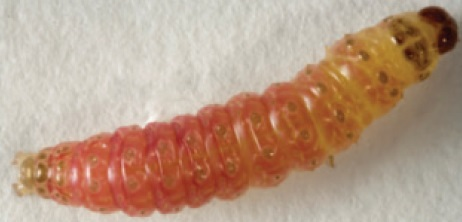
Late instar larva

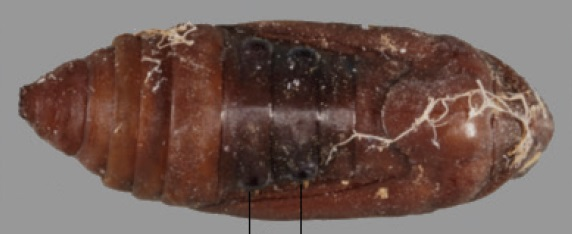
Pupa

The length of the forewings is 7.5–10.5 mm for males and 7–11.5 mm for females. The wing pattern is as in Leucinodes orbonalis.

The larvae feed on Solanum aethiopicum, Solanum lycopersicum and Solanum melongena.

== Etymology ==
The species name is derived from the continent of Africa from where the type material originates and refers to the widespread distribution of the species on the African continent.
