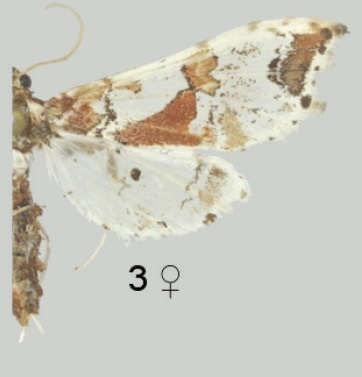

Scientific classification
- Domain: Eukaryota
- Kingdom: Animalia
- Phylum: Arthropoda
- Class: Insecta
- Order: Lepidoptera
- Family: Crambidae
- Genus: Leucinodes
- Species: L. rimavallis

Binomial name
- Leucinodes rimavallis Mally et al., 2015

= Leucinodes rimavallis =

Species of moth

Leucinodes rimavallis is a species of moth in the family Crambidae. It is found in Burundi, eastern and southern Democratic Republic of the Congo, Kenya, Rwanda, South Africa and Uganda. The species was described by Richard Mally, Anastasia Korycinska, David J. L. Agassiz, Jayne Hall, Jennifer Hodgetts and Matthias Nuss in 2015.

The length of the forewings is 8.5–12 mm for males and 7–14 mm for females. The wing pattern is as in Leucinodes orbonalis.

The larvae feed on Solanum melongena and Withania somnifera.

== Etymology ==
The species name refers to the African Rift Valley, the main distributional area of this species and is derived from Latin rima (meaning rift) and vallis (meaning valley).
