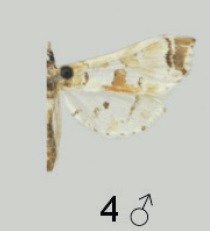

Scientific classification
- Domain: Eukaryota
- Kingdom: Animalia
- Phylum: Arthropoda
- Class: Insecta
- Order: Lepidoptera
- Family: Crambidae
- Genus: Leucinodes
- Species: L. pseudorbonalis

Binomial name
- Leucinodes pseudorbonalis Mally et al., 2015

= Leucinodes pseudorbonalis =

Species of moth

Leucinodes pseudorbonalis is a species of moth in the family Crambidae. It is found in Angola, Senegal and Uganda. The species was described by Richard Mally, Anastasia Korycinska, David J. L. Agassiz, Jayne Hall, Jennifer Hodgetts and Matthias Nuss in 2015.

The length of the forewings is 7–8.5 mm for males and 9–11 mm for females. The wing pattern is as in Leucinodes orbonalis.

The larvae feed on Solanum aethiopicum and Solanum melongena.

== Etymology ==
The species name refers to the similarities in external and male genital characters with Leucinodes orbonalis and is derived from Greek pseud(o) (meaning false) and orbonalis (the name of the similar species).
