= Rhectosemia nomophiloides =

Scientific classification
- Kingdom: Animalia
- Phylum: Arthropoda
- Class: Insecta
- Order: Lepidoptera
- Family: Crambidae
- Genus: Rhectosemia
- Species: R. nomophiloides

Binomial name
- Rhectosemia nomophiloides Munroe, 1959

Species of moth

Rhectosemia nomophiloides is a moth in the family Crambidae. It was described by Eugene G. Munroe in 1959. It is found in Bolivia.
