= Atomopteryx solanalis =

Scientific classification
- Kingdom: Animalia
- Phylum: Arthropoda
- Class: Insecta
- Order: Lepidoptera
- Family: Crambidae
- Genus: Atomopteryx
- Species: A. solanalis

Binomial name
- Atomopteryx solanalis (Barnes & McDunnough, 1913)

Synonyms
- Stenoptycha solanalis Barnes & McDunnough, 1913

Species of moth

Atomopteryx solanalis, the carabid moth, is a moth in the family Crambidae. It is found in North America, where it has been recorded from Florida. The species was first described by William Barnes and James Halliday McDunnough in 1913.
