= Syllepte hemichionalis =

Scientific classification
- Domain: Eukaryota
- Kingdom: Animalia
- Phylum: Arthropoda
- Class: Insecta
- Order: Lepidoptera
- Family: Crambidae
- Genus: Syllepte
- Species: S. hemichionalis

Binomial name
- Syllepte hemichionalis (Mabille, 1900)

Synonyms
- Sylepta hemichionalis Mabille, 1900; Leucinodes hemichionalis; Syllepta hemichionalis idalis Viette, 1958

Species of moth

Syllepte hemichionalis is a moth species in the genus Leucinodes of the family of Crambidae. It is found in Madagascar and on the Comoros.

== Subspecies ==
- Syllepte hemichionalis hemichionalis
- Syllepte hemichionalis idalis (Viette, 1958) (Comoros)
