= Rhectosemia vausignalis =

Scientific classification
- Kingdom: Animalia
- Phylum: Arthropoda
- Class: Insecta
- Order: Lepidoptera
- Family: Crambidae
- Genus: Rhectosemia
- Species: R. vausignalis

Binomial name
- Rhectosemia vausignalis Hampson, 1918

Synonyms
- Rhectosemia vausignalis

Species of moth

Rhectosemia vausignalis is a moth in the family Crambidae. It was described by George Hampson in 1918. It is found in Peru and Bolivia.
