= Analyta gammalis =

Scientific classification
- Kingdom: Animalia
- Phylum: Arthropoda
- Class: Insecta
- Order: Lepidoptera
- Family: Crambidae
- Subfamily: Spilomelinae
- Tribe: Margaroniini
- Genus: Analyta
- Species: A. gammalis

Binomial name
- Analyta gammalis Viette, 1958

Species of moth

Analyta gammalis is a species of moth of the family Crambidae. It was described by Pierre Viette in 1958 and is found in eastern Madagascar.

Its wingspan is 24 mm, with a length of the forewings of 11.5 mm.

The holotype had been collected near Ranomafana, Ifanadiana, in eastern Madagascar.
