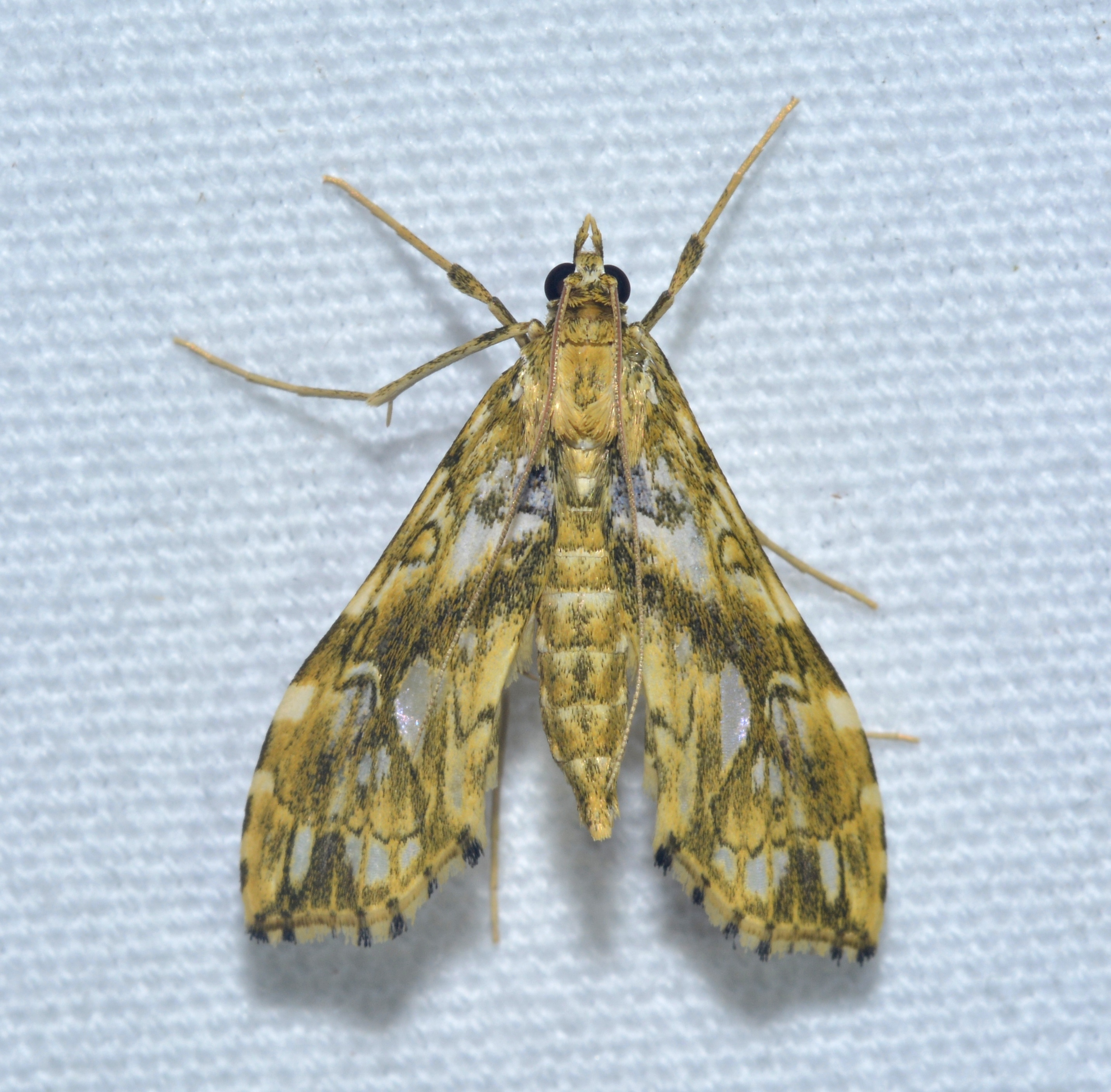

Scientific classification
- Kingdom: Animalia
- Phylum: Arthropoda
- Clade: Pancrustacea
- Class: Insecta
- Order: Lepidoptera
- Family: Crambidae
- Genus: Rhectosemia
- Species: R. viriditincta

Binomial name
- Rhectosemia viriditincta Munroe, 1959

= Rhectosemia viriditincta =

Species of moth

Rhectosemia viriditincta is a species of moth in the family Crambidae. It was first described in 1959 by Eugene G. Munroe. It is found in Santa Catarina, Brazil and Costa Rica.
