= Leucinodes unilinealis =

Scientific classification
- Kingdom: Animalia
- Phylum: Arthropoda
- Clade: Pancrustacea
- Class: Insecta
- Order: Lepidoptera
- Family: Crambidae
- Genus: Leucinodes
- Species: L. unilinealis

Binomial name
- Leucinodes unilinealis Snellen, 1899

Species of moth

Leucinodes unilinealis is a moth in the family Crambidae, found on Java.

It was described by Snellen in 1899.
