= Proleucinodes xylopastalis =

Scientific classification
- Kingdom: Animalia
- Phylum: Arthropoda
- Class: Insecta
- Order: Lepidoptera
- Family: Crambidae
- Genus: Proleucinodes
- Species: P. xylopastalis

Binomial name
- Proleucinodes xylopastalis (Schaus, 1912)

Synonyms
- Leucinodes xylopastalis Schaus, 1912

Species of moth

Proleucinodes xylopastalis is a moth in the family Crambidae. It was described by William Schaus in 1912. It is found in Costa Rica, Guatemala and Mexico.

The wingspan is about 31 mm. The wings are semi-hyaline with greenish-white markings. The outer margin of the forewings is whitish with a narrow border of buff and a slightly darker subparallel subterminal line. The hindwings have an ocherous-white outer margin with a narrow border of buff and a postmedial line subparallel from the costa to about midway between veins 3 and 2 where it is bent sharply inward toward the cell to slightly below the outer angle of the cell and then continuing unevenly to the hind margin.
