= Rhectosemia longistrialis =

Scientific classification
- Kingdom: Animalia
- Phylum: Arthropoda
- Class: Insecta
- Order: Lepidoptera
- Family: Crambidae
- Genus: Rhectosemia
- Species: R. longistrialis

Binomial name
- Rhectosemia longistrialis Dognin, 1904

Species of moth

Rhectosemia longistrialis is a moth in the family Crambidae. It was described by Paul Dognin in 1904. It is found in Ecuador.
