= Rhectosemia multifarialis =

Scientific classification
- Kingdom: Animalia
- Phylum: Arthropoda
- Class: Insecta
- Order: Lepidoptera
- Family: Crambidae
- Genus: Rhectosemia
- Species: R. multifarialis

Binomial name
- Rhectosemia multifarialis Lederer, 1863

Species of moth

Rhectosemia multifarialis is a moth in the family Crambidae. It was described by Julius Lederer in 1863. It is found in Venezuela, Brazil, Mexico and Costa Rica.
