= Leucinodes perlucidalis =

Scientific classification
- Kingdom: Animalia
- Phylum: Arthropoda
- Clade: Pancrustacea
- Class: Insecta
- Order: Lepidoptera
- Family: Crambidae
- Genus: Leucinodes
- Species: L. perlucidalis

Binomial name
- Leucinodes perlucidalis Caradja in Caradja & Meyrick, 1933

Species of moth

Leucinodes perlucidalis is a moth in the family Crambidae. It was described by Aristide Caradja in 1933. It is found in Guangdong, China.
