= Leucinodes raondry =

Scientific classification
- Kingdom: Animalia
- Phylum: Arthropoda
- Class: Insecta
- Order: Lepidoptera
- Family: Crambidae
- Genus: Leucinodes
- Species: L. raondry

Binomial name
- Leucinodes raondry (Viette, 1981)

Synonyms
- Daraba raondry Viette, 1981

Species of moth

Leucinodes raondry is a species of moth in the family Crambidae. It is found in Madagascar. The species was first described by Pierre Viette in 1981.
