= Atomopteryx doeri =

Scientific classification
- Kingdom: Animalia
- Phylum: Arthropoda
- Class: Insecta
- Order: Lepidoptera
- Family: Crambidae
- Genus: Atomopteryx
- Species: A. doeri

Binomial name
- Atomopteryx doeri Walsingham, 1891

Species of moth

Atomopteryx doeri is a moth in the family Crambidae. It was described by Walsingham in 1891. It is found in Brazil.
