= Atomopteryx peruviana =

Scientific classification
- Kingdom: Animalia
- Phylum: Arthropoda
- Clade: Pancrustacea
- Class: Insecta
- Order: Lepidoptera
- Family: Crambidae
- Genus: Atomopteryx
- Species: A. peruviana

Binomial name
- Atomopteryx peruviana (Zeller, 1877)

Synonyms
- Stenoptycha peruviana Zeller, 1877

Species of moth

Atomopteryx peruviana is a moth in the family Crambidae. It was described by Zeller in 1877. It is found in Peru.
