= Analyta heranicealis =

Scientific classification
- Kingdom: Animalia
- Phylum: Arthropoda
- Class: Insecta
- Order: Lepidoptera
- Family: Crambidae
- Subfamily: Spilomelinae
- Tribe: Margaroniini
- Genus: Analyta
- Species: A. heranicealis

Binomial name
- Analyta heranicealis (Walker, 1859)

Synonyms
- Leucinodes heranicealis Walker, 1859

Species of moth

Analyta heranicealis is a moth in the family Crambidae. It was described by Francis Walker in 1859. It is found on Borneo.

The wings are white with two interrupted yellowish lines. The forewings with some irregular brown marks at the base and with a short brown streak along the first part of the exterior border. There is a brown spot on the hindwings at the middle of the interior border, as well as a blackish subapical dot.
