= Analyta calligrammalis =

Scientific classification
- Kingdom: Animalia
- Phylum: Arthropoda
- Class: Insecta
- Order: Lepidoptera
- Family: Crambidae
- Subfamily: Spilomelinae
- Tribe: Margaroniini
- Genus: Analyta
- Species: A. calligrammalis

Binomial name
- Analyta calligrammalis Mabille, 1879

Synonyms
- Alyta calligrammalis Mabille, 1879

Species of moth

Analyta calligrammalis is a species of moth of the family Crambidae. It is found in Sierra Leone, Ghana, Madagascar, Seychelles as well as in Cameroon, The Gambia, Nigeria, South Africa, and Mali.

Its wingspan is 24–26 mm.

The larvae have been recorded feeding on Ficus species.
