= Leucinodes grisealis =

Scientific classification
- Domain: Eukaryota
- Kingdom: Animalia
- Phylum: Arthropoda
- Class: Insecta
- Order: Lepidoptera
- Family: Crambidae
- Genus: Leucinodes
- Species: L. grisealis

Binomial name
- Leucinodes grisealis (Kenrick, 1912)

Synonyms
- Sceliodes grisealis Kenrick, 1912

Species of moth

Leucinodes grisealis is a species of moth in the family Crambidae. It is found in New Guinea, where it has been recorded from Arfak Mountains. It was first described by George Hamilton Kenrick in 1912.
