= Leucinodes labefactalis =

Scientific classification
- Kingdom: Animalia
- Phylum: Arthropoda
- Clade: Pancrustacea
- Class: Insecta
- Order: Lepidoptera
- Family: Crambidae
- Genus: Leucinodes
- Species: L. labefactalis

Binomial name
- Leucinodes labefactalis C. Swinhoe, 1904

Species of moth

Leucinodes labefactalis is a moth in the family Crambidae. It was described by Charles Swinhoe in 1904. It is found on Borneo.
