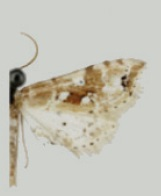

Scientific classification
- Domain: Eukaryota
- Kingdom: Animalia
- Phylum: Arthropoda
- Class: Insecta
- Order: Lepidoptera
- Family: Crambidae
- Genus: Leucinodes
- Species: L. ethiopica

Binomial name
- Leucinodes ethiopica Mally et al., 2015

= Leucinodes ethiopica =

Species of moth

Leucinodes ethiopica is a species of moth in the family Crambidae. It is found in Eritrea, Ethiopia and Saudi Arabia. The species was described by Richard Mally, Anastasia Korycinska, David J. L. Agassiz, Jayne Hall, Jennifer Hodgetts and Matthias Nuss in 2015.

The length of the forewings is 6–8 mm for both males and females. The forewings are mixed ochreous and white. There is an oblique dark ochreous fascia from above the dorsum reaching halfway across the wing, as well as a blackish crescent before the ochreous subterminal line and there are black dots along the termen. The hindwings are white with a small black discal spot, a faint irregular dark subterminal line and ochreous suffusion in the outer part of the wing in the middle and towards the apex.

== Etymology ==
The species name refers to Ethiopia, where the holotype originates.
