= Analyta pervinca =

Scientific classification
- Kingdom: Animalia
- Phylum: Arthropoda
- Class: Insecta
- Order: Lepidoptera
- Family: Crambidae
- Subfamily: Spilomelinae
- Tribe: Margaroniini
- Genus: Analyta
- Species: A. pervinca

Binomial name
- Analyta pervinca Ghesquière, 1942

Species of moth

Analyta pervinca is a moth in the family Crambidae. It was described by Jean Ghesquière in 1942. It is found in the Democratic Republic of the Congo, where it has been recorded from Katanga Province.
