= Leucinodes diaphana =

Scientific classification
- Kingdom: Animalia
- Phylum: Arthropoda
- Clade: Pancrustacea
- Class: Insecta
- Order: Lepidoptera
- Family: Crambidae
- Genus: Leucinodes
- Species: L. diaphana

Binomial name
- Leucinodes diaphana (Hampson, 1891)

Synonyms
- Cirrhochrista diaphana Hampson, 1891

Species of moth

Leucinodes diaphana is a moth in the family Crambidae. It was described by George Hampson in 1891. It is found in India.
