= Analyta beaulaincourti =

Scientific classification
- Kingdom: Animalia
- Phylum: Arthropoda
- Class: Insecta
- Order: Lepidoptera
- Family: Crambidae
- Subfamily: Spilomelinae
- Tribe: Margaroniini
- Genus: Analyta
- Species: A. beaulaincourti

Binomial name
- Analyta beaulaincourti Rougeot, 1977

Species of moth

Analyta beaulaincourti is a moth in the family Crambidae. It was described by Rougeot in 1977. It is found in Djibouti.
