= Leucinodes bilinealis =

Scientific classification
- Kingdom: Animalia
- Phylum: Arthropoda
- Clade: Pancrustacea
- Class: Insecta
- Order: Lepidoptera
- Family: Crambidae
- Genus: Leucinodes
- Species: L. bilinealis

Binomial name
- Leucinodes bilinealis Snellen, 1899

Species of moth

Leucinodes bilinealis is a moth in the family Crambidae. It was described by Snellen in 1899. It is found on Sulawesi.
