= Analyta semantris =

Scientific classification
- Kingdom: Animalia
- Phylum: Arthropoda
- Class: Insecta
- Order: Lepidoptera
- Family: Crambidae
- Subfamily: Spilomelinae
- Tribe: Margaroniini
- Genus: Analyta
- Species: A. semantris

Binomial name
- Analyta semantris Dyar, 1914

Species of moth

Analyta semantris is a moth in the family Crambidae. It was described by Harrison Gray Dyar Jr. in 1914. It is found in Panama and French Guiana.

The wingspan is about 17 mm. There is an irregularly triangular yellow patch on the forewings near the middle of the inner margin. The costa is blackish purple, the outer area suffused with red brown. The costal edge is red brown, followed by a purple band. The hindwings are white, shaded by yellow at the base, apex and the costal mark.
