= Rhectosemia compositalis =

Scientific classification
- Kingdom: Animalia
- Phylum: Arthropoda
- Class: Insecta
- Order: Lepidoptera
- Family: Crambidae
- Genus: Rhectosemia
- Species: R. compositalis

Binomial name
- Rhectosemia compositalis Schaus, 1912

Species of moth

Rhectosemia compositalis is a moth in the family Crambidae. It was described by Schaus in 1912. It is found in Costa Rica.
