= Analyta albicillalis =

Scientific classification
- Kingdom: Animalia
- Phylum: Arthropoda
- Clade: Pancrustacea
- Class: Insecta
- Order: Lepidoptera
- Family: Crambidae
- Subfamily: Spilomelinae
- Tribe: Margaroniini
- Genus: Analyta
- Species: A. albicillalis

Binomial name
- Analyta albicillalis Lederer, 1863

Species of moth

Analyta albicillalis is a moth in the family Crambidae. It was described by Julius Lederer in 1863. It is found in Indonesia (Ambon Island) and Australia, where it has been recorded Queensland.
