= Rhectosemia argentipunctalis =

Scientific classification
- Kingdom: Animalia
- Phylum: Arthropoda
- Class: Insecta
- Order: Lepidoptera
- Family: Crambidae
- Genus: Rhectosemia
- Species: R. argentipunctalis

Binomial name
- Rhectosemia argentipunctalis H. Druce, 1895

Species of moth

Rhectosemia argentipunctalis is a moth in the family Crambidae. It was described by Herbert Druce in 1895. It is found in the Mexican state of Veracruz and Guatemala.
