= Rhectosemia tumidicosta =

Scientific classification
- Kingdom: Animalia
- Phylum: Arthropoda
- Class: Insecta
- Order: Lepidoptera
- Family: Crambidae
- Genus: Rhectosemia
- Species: R. tumidicosta

Binomial name
- Rhectosemia tumidicosta Hampson, 1913

Species of moth

Rhectosemia tumidicosta is a moth in the family Crambidae. It was described by George Hampson in 1913. It is found in Colombia, and Bolivia.
