= Atomopteryx coelodactyla =

Scientific classification
- Kingdom: Animalia
- Phylum: Arthropoda
- Clade: Pancrustacea
- Class: Insecta
- Order: Lepidoptera
- Family: Crambidae
- Genus: Atomopteryx
- Species: A. coelodactyla

Binomial name
- Atomopteryx coelodactyla (Zeller, 1863)

Synonyms
- Stenoptycha coelodactyla Zeller, 1863; Stenoptycha caelodactyla; Stenoptycha coeldactyla D. S. Fletcher & Nye, 1984; Agathodes dubitalis Maassen, 1890; Stenoptycha lindigi C. Felder, R. Felder & Rogenhofer, 1875; Stenoptycha zelleri Butler, 1883

Species of moth

Atomopteryx coelodactyla is a moth in the family Crambidae. It was described by Philipp Christoph Zeller in 1863. It is found in Venezuela, Ecuador, Colombia and Chile.
