= Leucinodes erosialis =

Scientific classification
- Kingdom: Animalia
- Phylum: Arthropoda
- Clade: Pancrustacea
- Class: Insecta
- Order: Lepidoptera
- Family: Crambidae
- Genus: Leucinodes
- Species: L. erosialis

Binomial name
- Leucinodes erosialis Pagenstecher, 1884

Species of moth

Leucinodes erosialis is a moth in the family Crambidae. It was described by Pagenstecher in 1884. It is found in Indonesia (Ambon Island).
