= Atomopteryx incalis =

Scientific classification
- Kingdom: Animalia
- Phylum: Arthropoda
- Class: Insecta
- Order: Lepidoptera
- Family: Crambidae
- Genus: Atomopteryx
- Species: A. incalis

Binomial name
- Atomopteryx incalis (Hampson, 1913)

Synonyms
- Stenoptycha incalis Hampson, 1913

Species of moth

Atomopteryx incalis is a moth in the family Crambidae. It was described by George Hampson in 1913. It is found in Peru.
