= Proleucinodes lucealis =

Scientific classification
- Kingdom: Animalia
- Phylum: Arthropoda
- Class: Insecta
- Order: Lepidoptera
- Family: Crambidae
- Genus: Proleucinodes
- Species: P. lucealis

Binomial name
- Proleucinodes lucealis (C. Felder, R. Felder & Rogenhofer, 1875)

Synonyms
- Leucinodes lucealis C. Felder, R. Felder & Rogenhofer, 1875

Species of moth

Proleucinodes lucealis is a moth in the family Crambidae. It was described by Cajetan Felder, Rudolf Felder and Alois Friedrich Rogenhofer in 1875. It is found in French Guiana and Brazil.

The wingspan is 22–25 mm. The forewings have a brownish area bordering an excavation between the apex and vein 4, with the border continuous to the hind margin. There is a rather large brown patch next to it, separated by a narrow white line. The area extending from vein 5 to the hind margin has a short, dark fuscous line between it and the median patch on the hind margin and there is a small blackish or dark fuscous patch or spots on the outer margin in lower half of the excavation. The hindwings have a cinnamon-brown outer band extending from the apex to vein 3.
