= Atomopteryx =

Scientific classification
- Kingdom: Animalia
- Phylum: Arthropoda
- Class: Insecta
- Order: Lepidoptera
- Family: Crambidae
- Tribe: Lineodini
- Genus: Atomopteryx; Walsingham, 1891

Synonyms
- Zellerina Torre y Callejas, 1958; Stenoptycha Zeller, 1863

Genus of moths

Atomopteryx is a genus of moths of the family Crambidae.

== Species ==
- Atomopteryx coelodactyla (Zeller, 1863)
- Atomopteryx doeri Walsingham, 1891
- Atomopteryx erschoffiana (Zeller, 177)
- Atomopteryx incalis (Hampson, 1913)
- Atomopteryx perelongata (Hampson, 1913)
- Atomopteryx peruviana (Zeller, 1877)
- Atomopteryx pterophoralis (Walker, 1866)
- Atomopteryx serpentifera (Hampson, 1913)
- Atomopteryx solanalis
- Atomopteryx unicolor (E. Hering, 1906)
