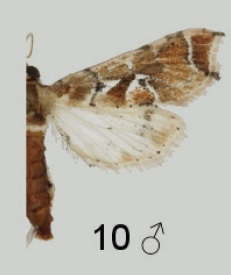

Scientific classification
- Domain: Eukaryota
- Kingdom: Animalia
- Phylum: Arthropoda
- Class: Insecta
- Order: Lepidoptera
- Family: Crambidae
- Genus: Leucinodes
- Species: L. ugandensis

Binomial name
- Leucinodes ugandensis Mally et al., 2015

= Leucinodes ugandensis =

Species of moth

Leucinodes ugandensis is a species of moth in the family Crambidae. It is found in Ethiopia, Kenya, Somalia, South Sudan and Uganda. The species was described by Richard Mally, Anastasia Korycinska, David J. L. Agassiz, Jayne Hall, Jennifer Hodgetts and Matthias Nuss in 2015.

The length of the forewings is 6.5–11.5 mm for both males and females. The forewings are pale fuscous with an oblique brown partial fascia halfway, with white markings on either side. There is an orange triangle on the dorsum beyond halfway and the apex is deep brown, separated by a whitish line. The hindwings are whitish, fuscous suffused near the margin in the middle and towards the apex and with a faint subterminal line in the costal part of the wing.

The larvae feed on Solanum species.

== Etymology ==
The species name refers to Uganda, where the type specimens originate.
