= Proleucinodes melanoleuca =

Scientific classification
- Kingdom: Animalia
- Phylum: Arthropoda
- Class: Insecta
- Order: Lepidoptera
- Family: Crambidae
- Genus: Proleucinodes
- Species: P. melanoleuca

Binomial name
- Proleucinodes melanoleuca (Hampson, 1913)

Synonyms
- Leucinodes melanoleuca Hampson, 1913

Species of moth

Proleucinodes melanoleuca is a moth in the family Crambidae. It was described by George Hampson in 1913. It is found in Peru.

The wingspan is 32–34 mm. The forewings are white and semihyaline, except the marginal areas, which are irrorated (sprinkled) with some black scales. The base is largely irrorated with black and with two indistinct waved black subbasal lines. There is a discoidal spot, defined by a few black scales, its upper part filled with pale red brown and with a pale red-brown spot above it below the costa. The postmedial line consists of a slight brown mark and a series of black spots. The hindwings are white and semihyaline, except for the terminal area. There is some black at the base and a pale brownish discoidal spot defined by some black scales.
