= Leucinodes melanopalis =

Scientific classification
- Kingdom: Animalia
- Phylum: Arthropoda
- Clade: Pancrustacea
- Class: Insecta
- Order: Lepidoptera
- Family: Crambidae
- Genus: Leucinodes
- Species: L. melanopalis

Binomial name
- Leucinodes melanopalis Guenée, 1854

Synonyms
- Leucinodes auxialis Swinhoe, 1886

Species of moth

Leucinodes melanopalis is a moth in the family Crambidae. It was described by Achille Guenée in 1854. It is found in India.
