= Rhectosemia excisalis =

Scientific classification
- Kingdom: Animalia
- Phylum: Arthropoda
- Class: Insecta
- Order: Lepidoptera
- Family: Crambidae
- Genus: Rhectosemia
- Species: R. excisalis

Binomial name
- Rhectosemia excisalis (Snellen, 1900)

Synonyms
- Agathodes excisalis Snellen, 1900

Species of moth

Rhectosemia excisalis is a moth in the family Crambidae. It was described by Snellen in 1900. It is found in Argentina.
