= Leucinodes sigulalis =

Scientific classification
- Kingdom: Animalia
- Phylum: Arthropoda
- Clade: Pancrustacea
- Class: Insecta
- Order: Lepidoptera
- Family: Crambidae
- Genus: Leucinodes
- Species: L. sigulalis

Binomial name
- Leucinodes sigulalis Guenée, 1854

Species of moth

Leucinodes sigulalis is a moth in the family Crambidae. It was described by Achille Guenée in 1854. It is found in India.
