= Atomopteryx unicolor =

Scientific classification
- Kingdom: Animalia
- Phylum: Arthropoda
- Class: Insecta
- Order: Lepidoptera
- Family: Crambidae
- Genus: Atomopteryx
- Species: A. unicolor

Binomial name
- Atomopteryx unicolor (E. Hering, 1906)

Synonyms
- Stenoptycha unicolor E. Hering, 1906

Species of moth

Atomopteryx unicolor is a moth in the family Crambidae. It was described by E. Hering in 1906. It is found in Peru.
