= Analyta nigriflavalis =

Scientific classification
- Kingdom: Animalia
- Phylum: Arthropoda
- Class: Insecta
- Order: Lepidoptera
- Family: Crambidae
- Subfamily: Spilomelinae
- Tribe: Margaroniini
- Genus: Analyta
- Species: A. nigriflavalis

Binomial name
- Analyta nigriflavalis Hampson, 1913

Species of moth

Analyta nigriflavalis is a moth in the family Crambidae. It was described by George Hampson in 1913. It is found in Nigeria.
