= Analyta vansomereni =

Scientific classification
- Kingdom: Animalia
- Phylum: Arthropoda
- Class: Insecta
- Order: Lepidoptera
- Family: Crambidae
- Subfamily: Spilomelinae
- Tribe: Margaroniini
- Genus: Analyta
- Species: A. vansomereni

Binomial name
- Analyta vansomereni Tams, 1932

Species of moth

Analyta vansomereni is a moth in the family Crambidae. It was described by Willie Horace Thomas Tams in 1932. It is found in Kenya.
