= Atomopteryx pterophoralis =

Scientific classification
- Kingdom: Animalia
- Phylum: Arthropoda
- Class: Insecta
- Order: Lepidoptera
- Family: Crambidae
- Genus: Atomopteryx
- Species: A. pterophoralis

Binomial name
- Atomopteryx pterophoralis (Walker, 1866)

Synonyms
- Hydrocampa pterophoralis Walker, 1866

Species of moth

Atomopteryx pterophoralis is a moth in the family Crambidae. It was described by Francis Walker in 1866. It is found in the Dominican Republic, Puerto Rico and Cuba.
