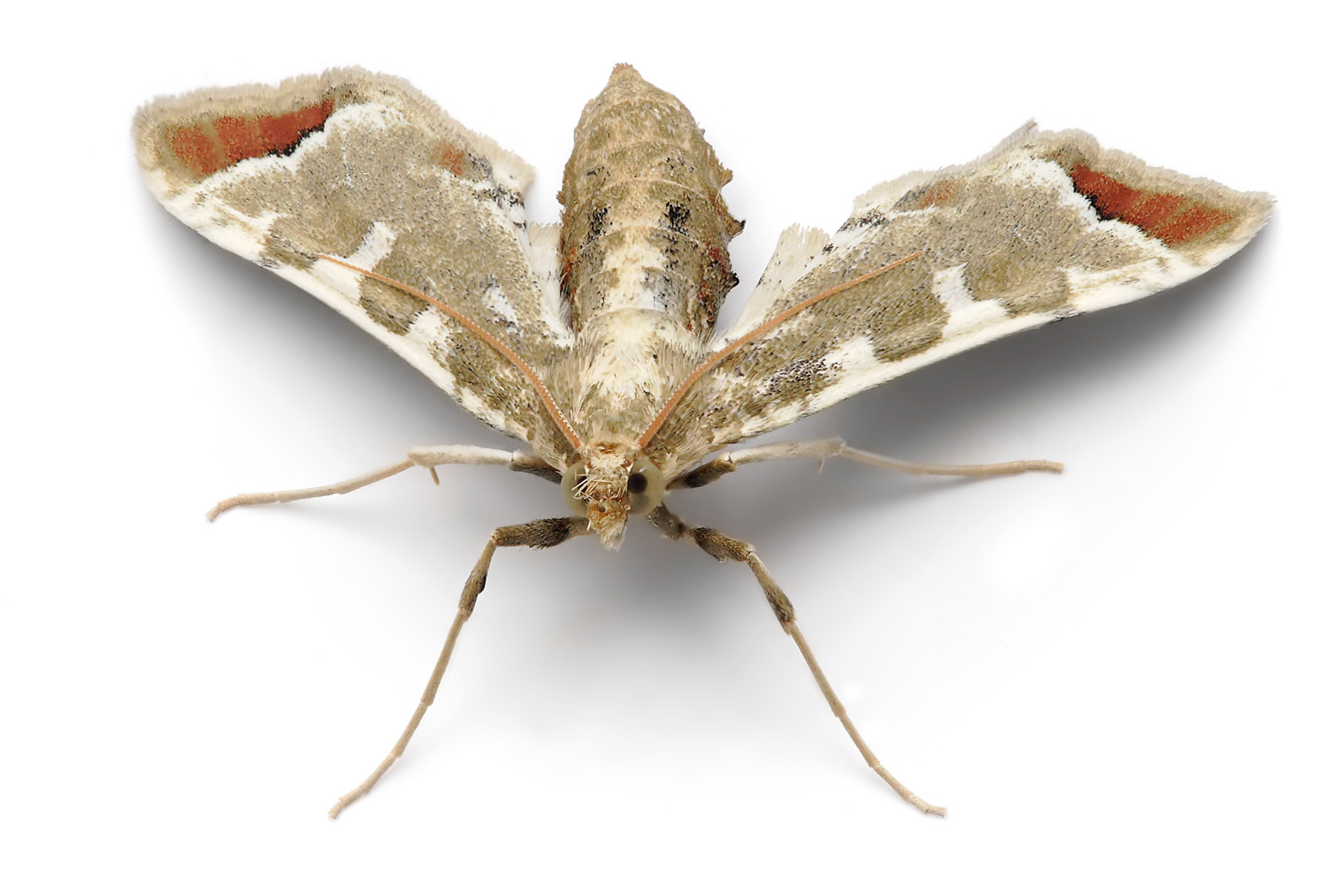

Scientific classification
- Domain: Eukaryota
- Kingdom: Animalia
- Phylum: Arthropoda
- Class: Insecta
- Order: Lepidoptera
- Family: Crambidae
- Genus: Leucinodes
- Species: L. cordalis

Binomial name
- Leucinodes cordalis (Doubleday, 1843)

Synonyms
- Margaritia cordalis Doubleday, 1843; Sceliodes cordalis; Daraba extensalis Walker, 1866; Eretria obsistalis Snellen, 1880; Sceliodes mucidalis Guenée, 1854

= Leucinodes cordalis =

Species of moth

Leucinodes cordalis, the poroporo fruit borer or eggfruit caterpillar, is a species of moth in the family Crambidae. It is found in New Zealand, Australia and Indonesia (Sulawesi). In Australia, it has been reported from Norfolk Island, the Northern Territory, Queensland, New South Wales, the Australian Capital Territory, Victoria, Tasmania and South Australia. The species was first described by Henry Doubleday in 1843.

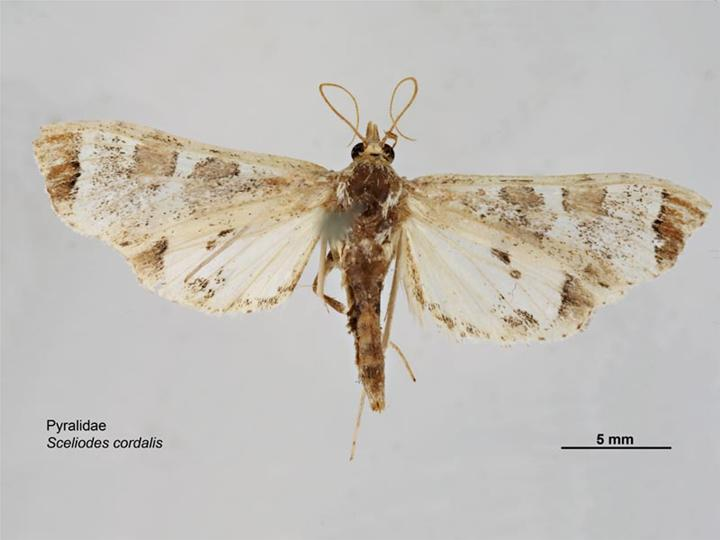
Dorsal view

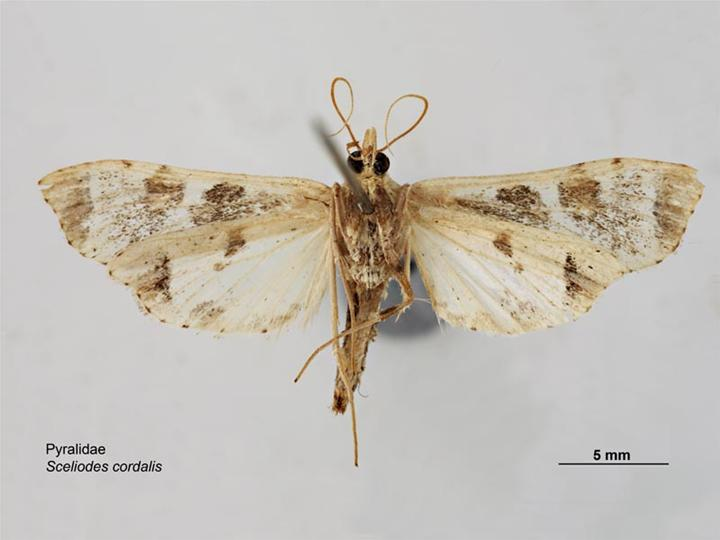
Ventral view

The length of the forewings is 13.5–15 mm. There are two generations per year in New Zealand. In Australia, there may be more generations.

The larvae feed on Solanum melongena, Solanum muricatum, Solanum aviculare, Solanum lycopersicum, Solanum esuriale, Solanum americanum, Solanum tuberosum, Capsicum annuum, Datura wrightii and Datura stramonium. They bore into the fruit of their host plant and feed on the flesh and seeds.
