= Rhectosemia striata =

Scientific classification
- Kingdom: Animalia
- Phylum: Arthropoda
- Class: Insecta
- Order: Lepidoptera
- Family: Crambidae
- Genus: Rhectosemia
- Species: R. striata

Binomial name
- Rhectosemia striata Munroe, 1959

Species of moth

Rhectosemia striata is a moth in the family Crambidae. It was described by Eugene G. Munroe in 1959. It is found in Chiapas, Mexico.
