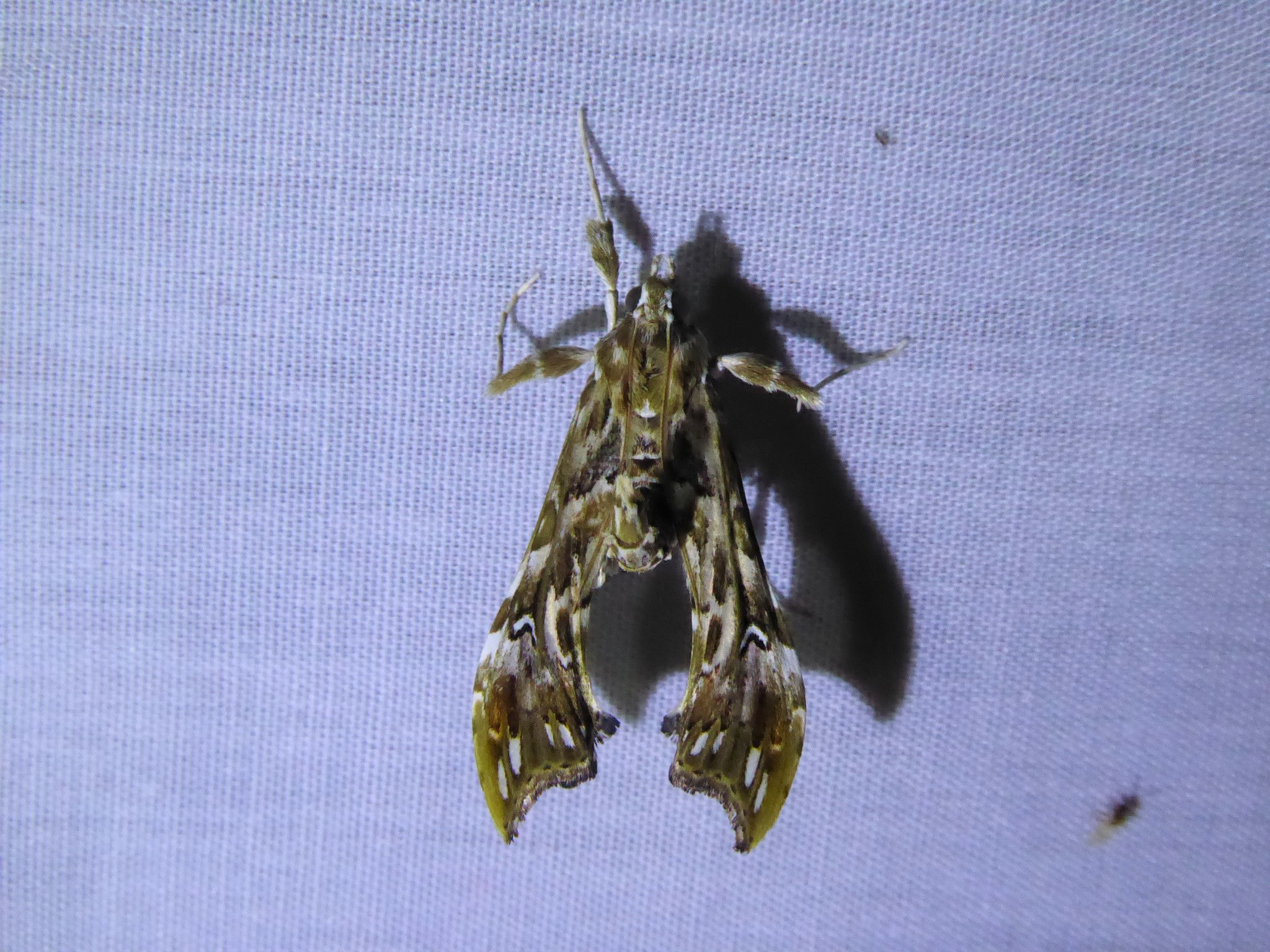

Scientific classification
- Kingdom: Animalia
- Phylum: Arthropoda
- Clade: Pancrustacea
- Class: Insecta
- Order: Lepidoptera
- Family: Crambidae
- Genus: Rhectosemia; Lederer, 1863

Synonyms
- Rhectosomia Lederer, 1863

= Rhectosemia =

Genus of moths

Rhectosemia is a genus of moths of the family Crambidae described by Julius Lederer in 1863.

== Species ==
- Rhectosemia antofagastalis Munroe, 1959
- Rhectosemia argentipunctalis H. Druce, 1895
- Rhectosemia braziliensis Munroe, 1959
- Rhectosemia compositalis Schaus, 1912
- Rhectosemia excisalis (Snellen, 1900)
- Rhectosemia longistrialis Dognin, 1904
- Rhectosemia multifarialis Lederer, 1863
- Rhectosemia nomophiloides Munroe, 1959
- Rhectosemia striata Munroe, 1959
- Rhectosemia tumidicosta Hampson, 1913
- Rhectosemia vausignalis Hampson, 1918
- Rhectosemia viriditincta Munroe, 1959
