= Proleucinodes =

Scientific classification
- Kingdom: Animalia
- Phylum: Arthropoda
- Class: Insecta
- Order: Lepidoptera
- Family: Crambidae
- Subfamily: Spilomelinae
- Genus: Proleucinodes; Capps, 1948

Genus of moths

Proleucinodes is a genus of moths of the family Crambidae.

== Species ==
- Proleucinodes impuralis (C. Felder, R. Felder & Rogenhofer, 1875)
- Proleucinodes lucealis (C. Felder, R. Felder & Rogenhofer, 1875)
- Proleucinodes melanoleuca (Hampson, 1913)
- Proleucinodes xylopastalis (Schaus, 1912)
