= Syllepte vagans =

Scientific classification
- Domain: Eukaryota
- Kingdom: Animalia
- Phylum: Arthropoda
- Class: Insecta
- Order: Lepidoptera
- Family: Crambidae
- Genus: Syllepte
- Species: S. vagans

Binomial name
- Syllepte vagans (Tutt, 1890)

Synonyms
- Aphytoceros vagans Tutt, 1890; Leucinodes vagans; Aphytoceros longipalpis Warren, 1892

Species of moth

Syllepte vagans, the leaden pearl, is a moth in the family Crambidae. It was described by Tutt in 1890. It is found in South Africa, Botswana, the Democratic Republic of Congo, Kenya, Mozambique, Namibia, Nigeria, Tanzania, Zambia and Zimbabwe. It is recorded infrequently in the Great Britain through accidental import.

The wingspan is 23–26 millimetres (0.91–1.02 in).
