= Analyta apicalis =

Scientific classification
- Kingdom: Animalia
- Phylum: Arthropoda
- Class: Insecta
- Order: Lepidoptera
- Family: Crambidae
- Subfamily: Spilomelinae
- Tribe: Margaroniini
- Genus: Analyta
- Species: A. apicalis

Binomial name
- Analyta apicalis (Hampson, 1896)

Synonyms
- Leucinodes apicalis Hampson, 1896; Analyta; (Hyperanalyta) pseudoapicalis Strand, 1918

Species of moth

Analyta apicalis is a moth in the family Crambidae. It was described by George Hampson in 1896. It is found in India, Sri Lanka and Taiwan.
