= Analyta =

Scientific classification
- Kingdom: Animalia
- Phylum: Arthropoda
- Clade: Pancrustacea
- Class: Insecta
- Order: Lepidoptera
- Family: Crambidae
- Subfamily: Spilomelinae
- Tribe: Margaroniini
- Genus: Analyta; Lederer, 1863

Synonyms
- Alyta Mabille, 1879; Hyperanalyta Strand, 1918

Genus of moths

Analyta is a genus of moths of the family Crambidae.

== Species ==
- Analyta apicalis Hampson, 1896
- Analyta albicillalis Lederer, 1863
- Analyta beaulaincourti Rougeot, 1977
- Analyta calligrammalis Mabille, 1879
- Analyta gammalis Viette, 1958
- Analyta heranicealis (Walker, 1859)
- Analyta nigriflavalis Hampson, 1913
- Analyta pervinca Ghesquière, 1942
- Analyta semantris Dyar, 1914
- Analyta vansomereni Tams, 1932

== Former species ==
- Analyta aldabralis (Viette, 1958)
