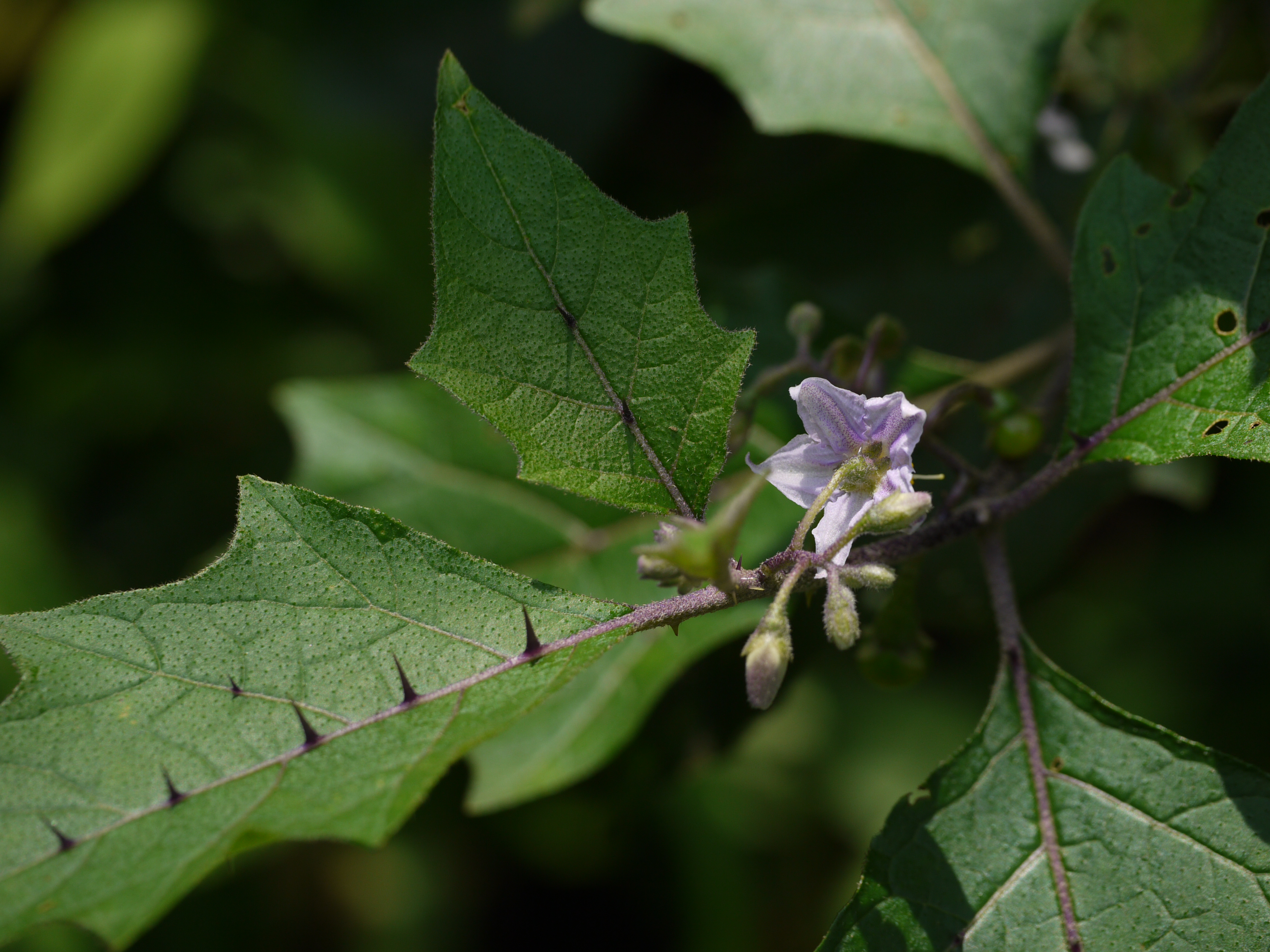

Scientific classification
- Kingdom: Plantae
- Clade: Tracheophytes
- Clade: Angiosperms
- Clade: Eudicots
- Clade: Asterids
- Order: Solanales
- Family: Solanaceae
- Genus: Solanum
- Species: S. anguivi

Binomial name
- Solanum anguivi Lam.

Synonyms
- List: Solanum aethiopicum subsp. anguivi (Lam.) Banfi, Galasso & Bartolucci; Solanum albidum De Wild.; Solanum albiflorum De Wild.; Solanum aurantiacobaccatum De Wild.; Solanum batangense Dammer; Solanum buettneri Dammer; Solanum carvalhoi Dammer; Solanum cultum De Wild.; Solanum dichroanthum Dammer; Solanum dinklagei Dammer; Solanum distichum Schumach. & Thonn.; Solanum flamignii De Wild.; Solanum grotei Dammer; Solanum halophilum Pax; Solanum hermannii Dunal; Solanum indicum var. brevipedicellatum Bitter; Solanum indicum subsp. distichum (Schumach. & Thonn.) Bitter; Solanum indicum subsp. mesodolichum Bitter; Solanum indicum subsp. pervilleanum Bitter; Solanum indicum var. pseudogeminifolium (Dammer) Bitter; Solanum jaegeri Dammer; Solanum jespersenii De Wild.; Solanum kandtii Dammer; Solanum keniense Turrill; Solanum lividum Link; Solanum mesodolichum (Bitter) Pic.Serm.; Solanum newtonii Dammer; Solanum nguelense Dammer; Solanum occidentale Dunal; Solanum olivaceum Dammer; Solanum orthocarpum Pic.Serm.; Solanum pseudogeminifolium Dammer; Solanum recurvum Hoffmanns.; Solanum rederi Dammer; Solanum rohrii C.H.Wright; Solanum ruwenzoriense De Wild.; Solanum sakarense Dammer; Solanum scalare C.H.Wright; Solanum schroederi Dammer; Solanum senegambicum Dunal; Solanum sodomeum L.; Solanum spathotrichum Dammer; Solanum stuhlmannii Dammer; Solanum ueleense De Wild.; Solanum urosepalum Dammer; Solanum wildemanii Dammer ex De Wild. & T.Durand; Solanum yangambiense De Wild.

= Solanum anguivi =

Species of flowering plant from Africa

Solanum anguivi is a plant indigenous to non-arid parts of Africa, and is commonly known as forest bitterberry or African eggplant, although the latter term is most commonly associated with Solanum aethiopicum.

It is a traditional ethnomedicine in India.
