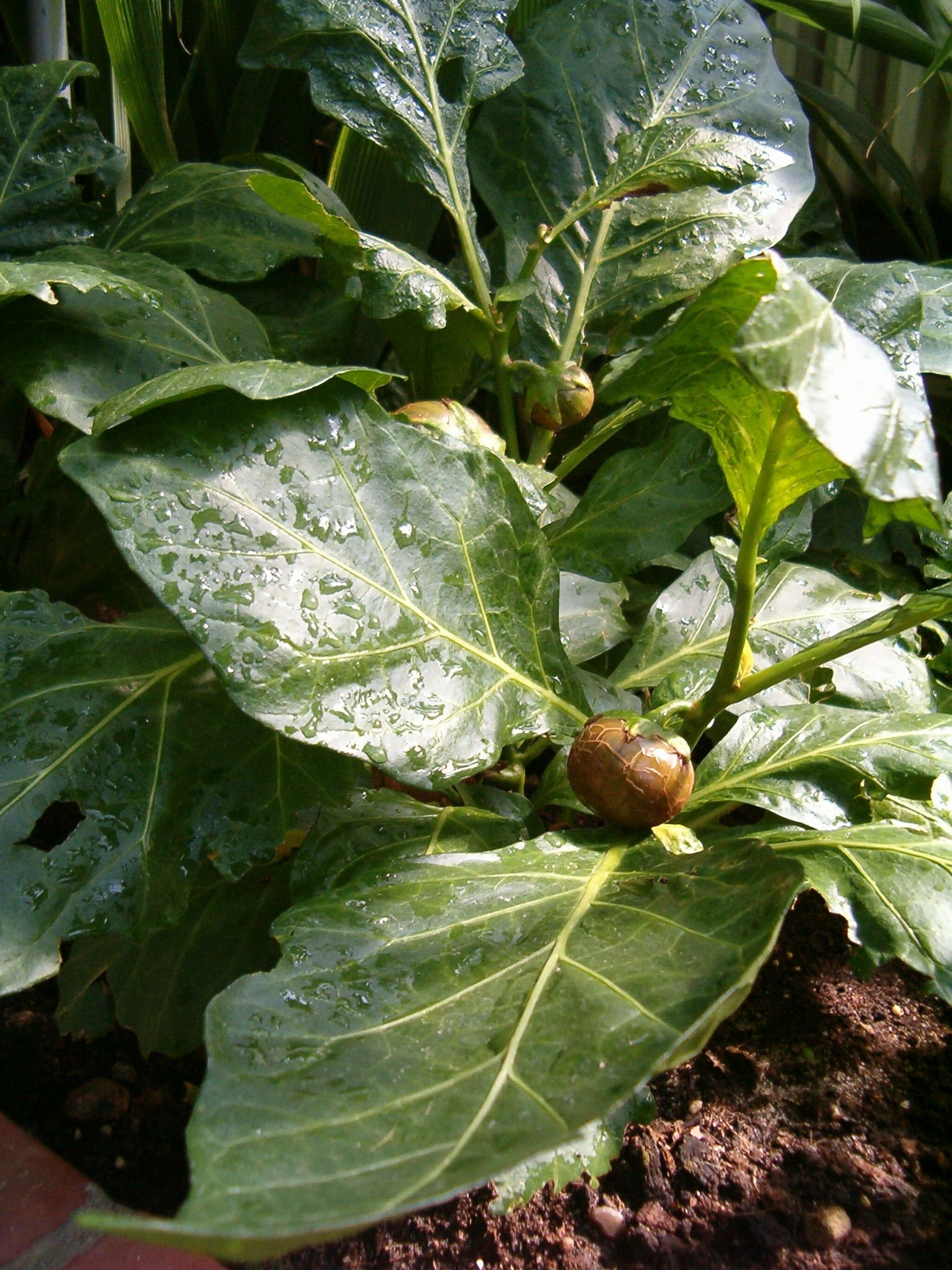

Scientific classification
- Kingdom: Plantae
- Clade: Tracheophytes
- Clade: Angiosperms
- Clade: Eudicots
- Clade: Asterids
- Order: Solanales
- Family: Solanaceae
- Genus: Solanum
- Species: S. macrocarpon

Binomial name
- Solanum macrocarpon L.

= Solanum macrocarpon =

Species of fruit and plant

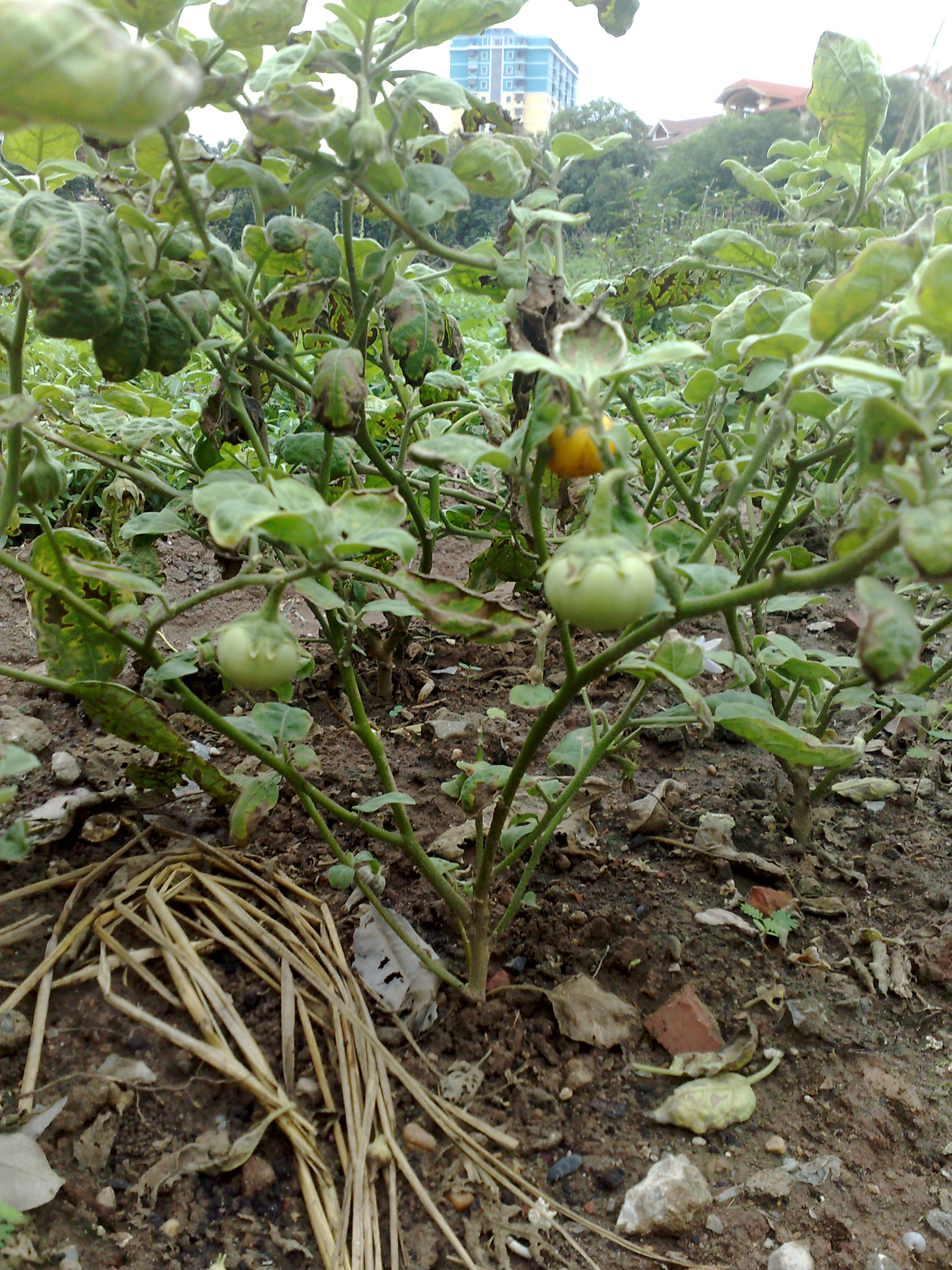
Solanum macrocarpon grown outside of Hanoi, Vietnam

Solanum macrocarpon otherwise known as the African eggplant (Yoruba: Igba) (Igbo language/ Igbo): añara), Surinamese eggplant (Sranang Tongo: Antroewa / Antruwa) or Vietnamese eggplant (Vietnamese: cà pháo, fire-cracker eggplant) is a plant of the family Solanaceae. S. macrocarpon is a tropical perennial plant that is closely related to the eggplant. S. macrocarpon originated from West Africa, but is now widely distributed in Central and East Africa. The plant also grows in the Caribbean, South America, and some parts of Southeast Asia. S. macrocarpon is widely cultivated for its use as a food, its medicinal purposes, and as an ornamental plant.

== Description ==
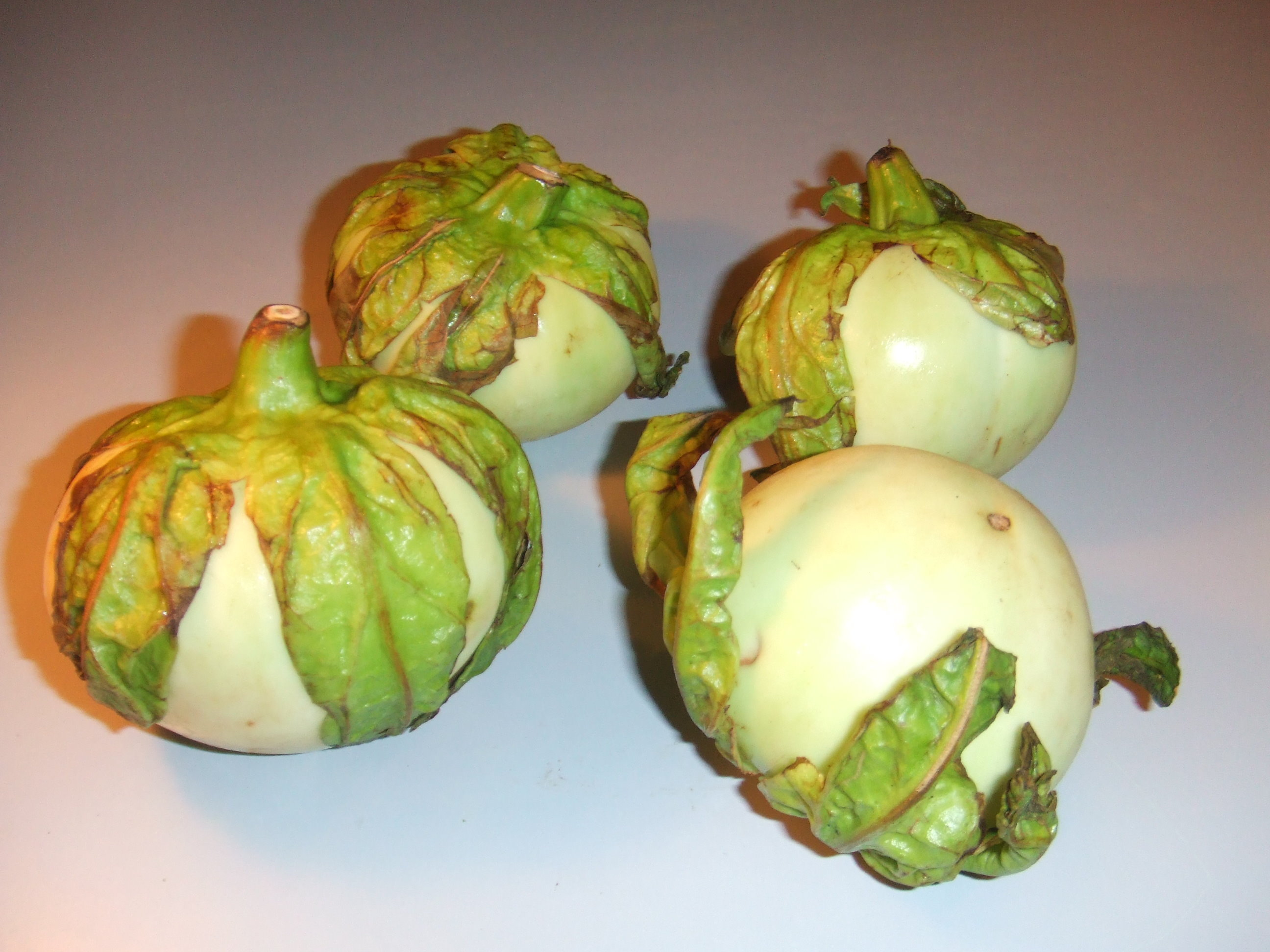
The fruit of S. macrocarpon

Solanum macrocarpon can grow to a height of 1-1.5 m. It has an alternate leaf pattern with the blade width of 4–15 cm and a height of 10–30 cm. The shapes of the leaves are oval and lobed with a wavy margin. Both sides of the leaves are hairy with stellate or simple hairs. Prickles may or may not be present on the leaves depending on the cultivar. When prickles are present they are found more along the midrib and lateral veins. The prickles are straight and can grow up to a length of 13 mm. The flowers have a diameter of 3–8 cm and are located on short stalked inflorescence that can contain 2 to 7 flowers. The lower portion of the plant carries bisexual flowers while the upper portion contains male flowers. The flowers are 2-3.5 cm in length and usually have a purple or pale purple color, on rare occasions there are white flowers.

The fruits are round, the top and the bottom are flattened out and have grooved portions with a length of 5–7 cm and a width of 7–8 cm. The stalk of the fruit is 1–4 cm long and is either de-curved or erect. At a young stage the color of the fruit is green, ivory, or a purple and white color with dark stripes. When ripe, the fruit turns yellow or a yellow-brown. The fruit contains many seeds and it is partly covered by the calyx lobes. The seeds have a length of 3-4.5 mm, a width of 2-3.5 mm, and are shaped in an obivoid or reniform.

Cultivars in Vietnam have fruit of 1.5 inches in diameter, looking similar to a golf ball with a stem. The color can be medium green, pale green, or white with green stripes.

== Ecology ==
Solanum macrocarpon has a large variety of cultivars. It grows in areas of high rainfall found in the tropical and humid regions of West and Central Africa, South-East Asia, South America and the Caribbean. Some cultivars can be found in the savanna and semi-arid region of Northern Ghana, Burkina Faso and their neighboring countries. The cultivars grown there consist of plants with small leaves and fruit. The fruit cultivars are only able to grow in humid coastal areas. S. macrocarpon can occasionally be found at higher altitudes but have a slower growth rate and are more robust. S. macrocarpon reproduces mostly by self-pollination. Out crossing occurs by bees and other insects, but at low frequencies. The flowers open early in the morning, while still dark. The stigma becomes receptive a few hours before the flower opens, and remains open for two days. The fruits are ready for picking 3–4 weeks after the fruit has set, but it takes about 10 weeks for the fruits to ripen. Germination typically begins a week after sowing. Flowering does not occur until 2–3 months after germination. S. macrocarpon that resides in the savannahs have an earlier flowering period compared to plants that reside in areas with high amounts of rainfall. The savannah cultivars are also more resistant to drought.

== Toxicity ==
Aside from the fruit, every other part of S. macrocarpon has been reported to cause heart failure, digestive problems, and lethargy in dogs. Because S. macrocarpon is part of the family Solanaceae, it contains alkaloids, giving the plant and fruit its bitter taste. Consuming the plant in large frequencies may potentially be poisonous. S. macrocarpon contains glycoalkaloids and the levels found in the fruit were 5-10 times higher than what is considered safe, and may not be safe for humans to eat.

== Uses ==
=== Culinary ===
Solanum macrocarpon is consumed in the various regions of the world where it is found. The parts of the plant that is consumed are the fruits and its young leaves. While taste of both the leaves and the fruit are very bitter they have a high nutrient yield.

The fruit's crunchy texture and mild flavor make it unique. It can be consumed raw without removing the skin. Typically, the Vietnamese eggplant has a slightly bitter taste, but the bitterness may become stronger when the eggplant is over-ripe. The Vietnamese eggplant is very neutral smelling when raw, and develops an earthy scent when cooked. Vietnamese eggplants are used in Vietnamese cuisine in stir fries, soups and salads. They are also eaten raw or pickled.

=== Medicinal ===
The roots, leaves, and fruit of S. macrocarpon contain medicinal qualities. In Nigeria, the fruit is used as a laxative, and as a means to treat cardiac diseases. The flowers are chewed on to clean teeth. In Sierra Leone the leaves are heated and then are chewed to ease throat pain. In Kenya the roots are boiled and the juice is then consumed to kill any hookworms in the stomach. The root is also used for bronchitis, body aches, asthma, and speed up the process of healing wounds. The seeds of S. macrocarpon crushed to treat toothaches. Promising molluscicidal and schistosomicidal activities were displayed for the S. macrocarpon extracts and fractions which are attributed to the glycoalkaloid content.

== See also ==
- Thai eggplant
- Tomatillo

== External reference ==
- Solanum incanum L., Prota database
