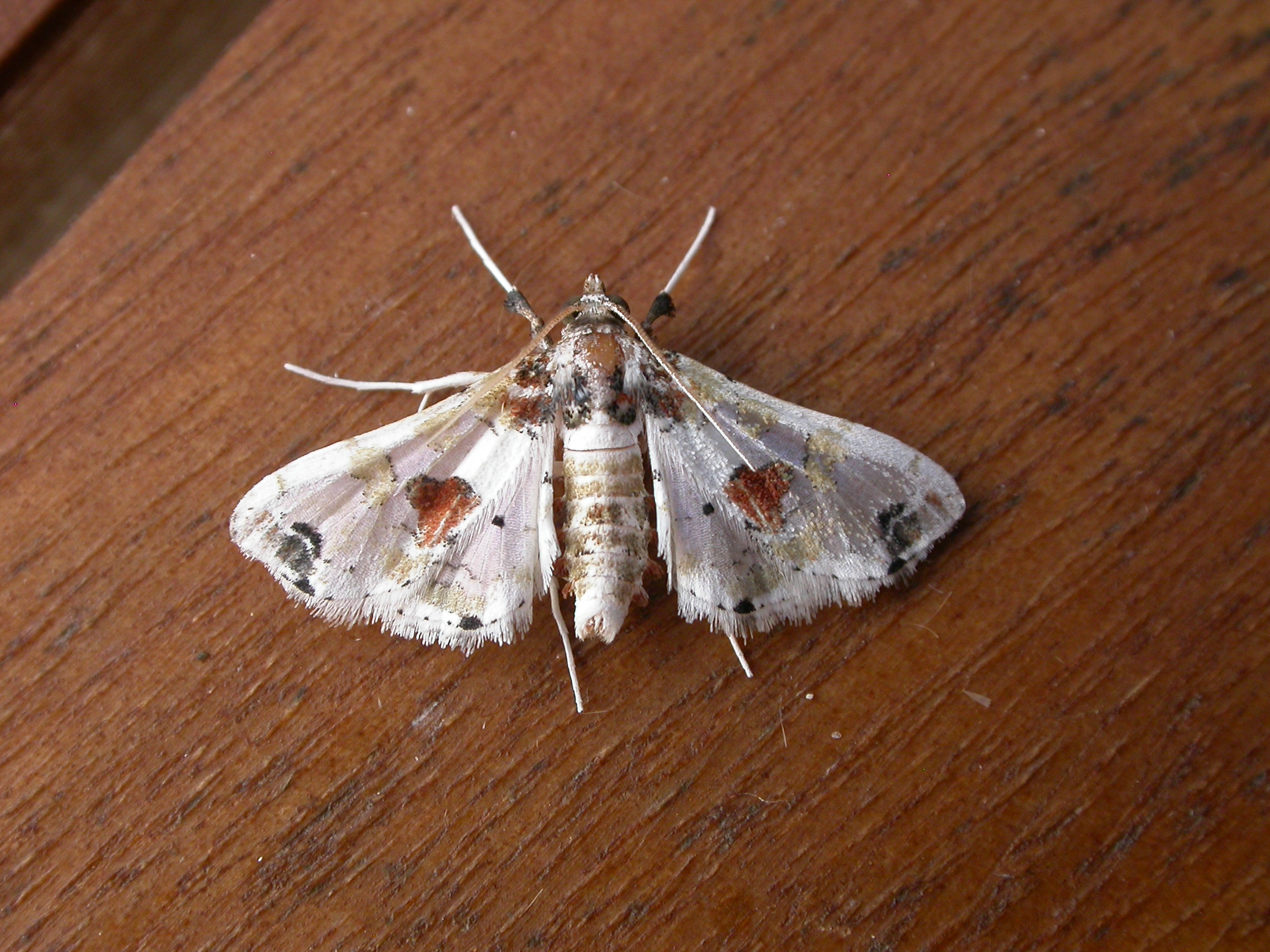

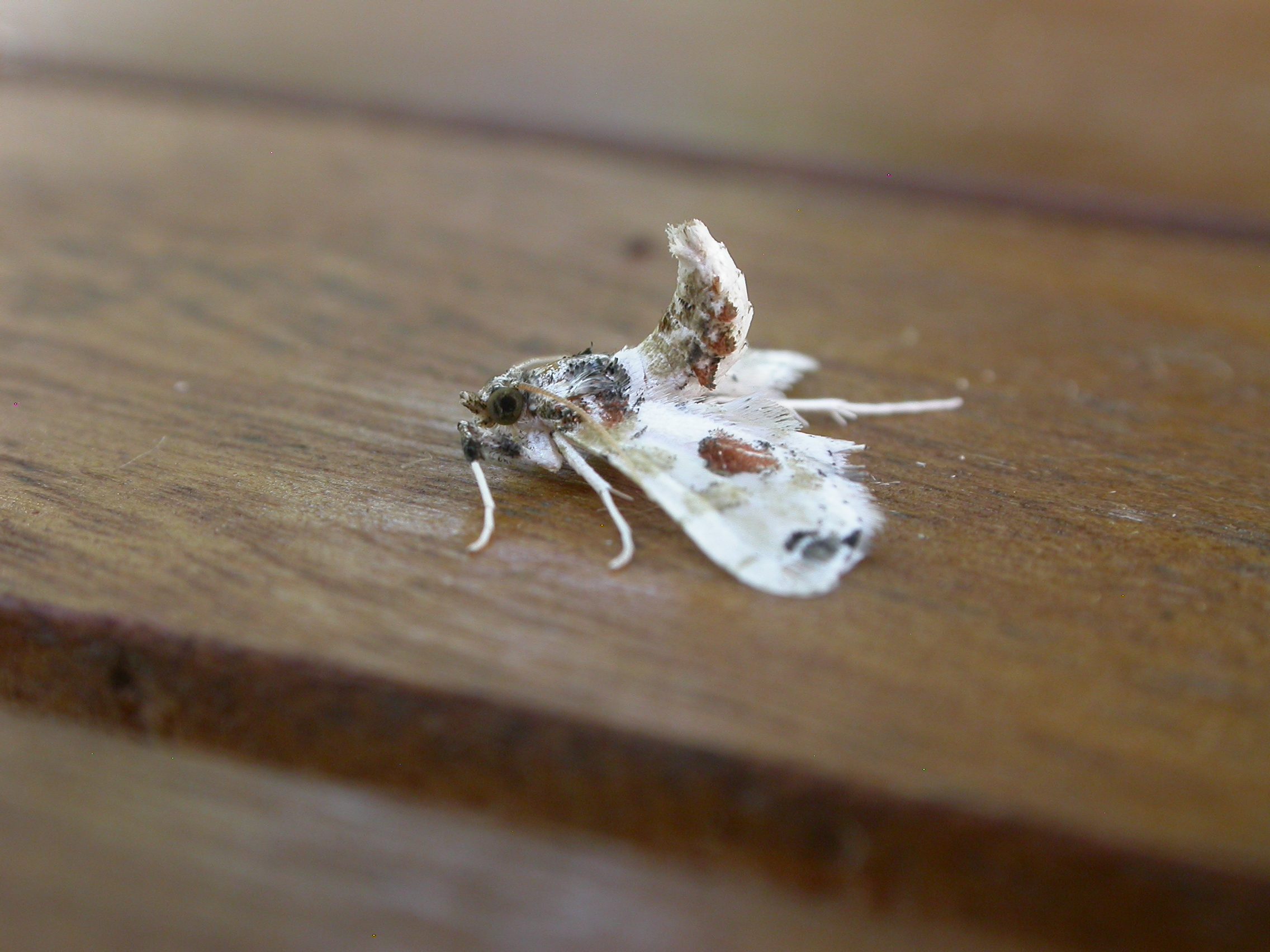

Scientific classification
- Kingdom: Animalia
- Phylum: Arthropoda
- Clade: Pancrustacea
- Class: Insecta
- Order: Lepidoptera
- Family: Crambidae
- Genus: Leucinodes
- Species: L. orbonalis

Binomial name
- Leucinodes orbonalis Guenée, 1854

= Leucinodes orbonalis =

Species of moth

Leucinodes orbonalis, the eggplant fruit and shoot borer or brinjal fruit and shoot borer, is a moth species in the genus Leucinodes described by Achille Guenée in 1854. Its native distribution is in the tropical and subtropical parts of Australia and Asia, where it is recorded from Pakistan, Nepal, India, including the Andaman Islands, Sri Lanka, Bangladesh, Myanmar, Laos, Cambodia, Vietnam, Thailand, China, Taiwan, Japan, Malaysia, Singapore, Brunei, the Philippines, and Indonesia (Java). It has also been intercepted from fruit imports in the U.S.A., the Netherlands, Denmark and Great Britain, where it was also reported from the wild. A taxonomic revision of the Leucinodes species of Sub-Saharan Africa concluded that L. orbonalis is currently not present in Africa, and that previous records of this species were misidentifications of previously undescribed species.

== Description of adults ==
Imagines have a forewing length of 8.5–10.5 mm in males and 9.5–12 mm in females. The forewing ground colour is white, with a light- to dark-brown basal area, delimited by a dark-brown to grey antemedial line. The median area has a pale-brown, faint proximal discoidal stigma. The distal discoidal stigma is pale brown, reaching from the costa to the forewing centre. The central dorsum has a prominent orange to dark brown L-shaped or triangular spot leading to the forewing centre and often meeting with the distal discoidal stigma. The antemedial line is sinuate, more or less distinct, but with a prominent subcostal bulge. The subapical half of the termen has a half moon-shaped brown to grey-grown spot. The marginal line is dotted. The hindwing ground colour is white. The internal area is white, with a discoidal spot, basicostally often with an auxiliary spot. The medial line is sinuate, the distal half approaching the discoidal spot, then turning towards the dorsum. The external area is pale brown to grey with a dotted marginal line.

== Food plants ==
The primary larval hostplant is eggplant or brinjal, Solanum melongena, where most of the economical impact of this species is reported. Secondary hostplants comprise tomato, potato, nightshade, Sodom apple, Ethiopian nightshade, potatotree, nipplefruit, black nightshade, turkey berry, tropical soda apple, Solanum anguivi, Solanum xanthocarpum, cape gooseberry, and Physalis minima.

Eggs are laid during the night on the lower surface of the young leaves, green stems, flower buds, or calyces of the fruits. Within an hour of hatching, the caterpillar (larva) bores into the nearest tender shoot, flower, or fruit. Soon after boring into shoots or fruits, they plug the entrance hole with excreta. In young plants, caterpillars are reported to bore inside petioles and midribs of large leaves. As a result, the affected leaves may drop off. Larval feeding inside shoots results in wilting of the young shoot. The damaged shoots ultimately drop off, disturbing plant growth and reducing fruit number and size. New shoots may grow but this delays crop maturity. Larval feeding inside the fruit results in the destruction of fruit tissue, making even slightly damaged fruit unfit for marketing.

A genetically modified brinjal, called Bt brinjal, has been developed to fight against L. orbonalis. Several other integrated pest management strategies, for example, sex pheromones, physical and mechanical barriers, cultural practices, use of bio-pesticides and biological agents, botanical pesticides and safer chemical pesticides has been suggested to combat this pest.

== Management of pests ==
=== Prevention ===
Tolerant varieties of eggplant are available.

Partners of the CABI-led programme Plantwise suggest synchronous planting with neighbouring fields to help reduce the spread of infestation. They also suggest protecting seedlings by growing them away from areas of known infestation and growing them under netting to prevent moths laying eggs.

Removal of any infected material up until harvest can also be conducted to prevent spread. In addition, removal of stubble from the previous season can help reduce carryover.

Partners of Plantwise also recommend crop rotation with root crops or pulses after Solanaceous planting can also be used as a method to reduce infestation.

==== Intercropping ====
Intercropping can be used to reduce infestation of L. orbonalis.

Partners of Plantwise have recommended using maize as a barrier crop and intercropping with non-host crops including cowpea, coriander, black gram and green gram.

=== Control ===
In small plantings, partners of Plantwise suggest infected shoots and fruits can be hand picked and eggs and larvae can be physically removed.

They also recommend introducing light traps into fields to attract moths at night.

Chemical control methods can also be used to control P. truncatus.

Due to variable regulations around (de-)registration of pesticides, specific chemical control methods may differ between countries.

== Gallery ==
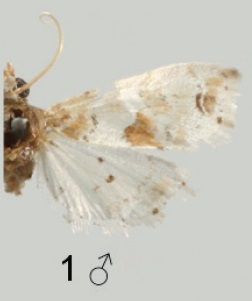
Mounted male imago

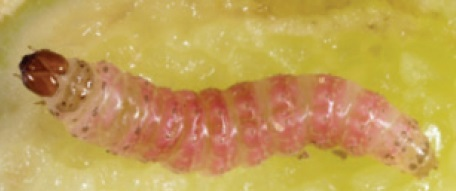
Mid instar larva

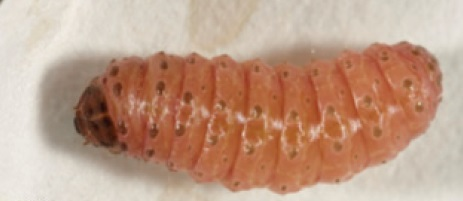
Late instar larva

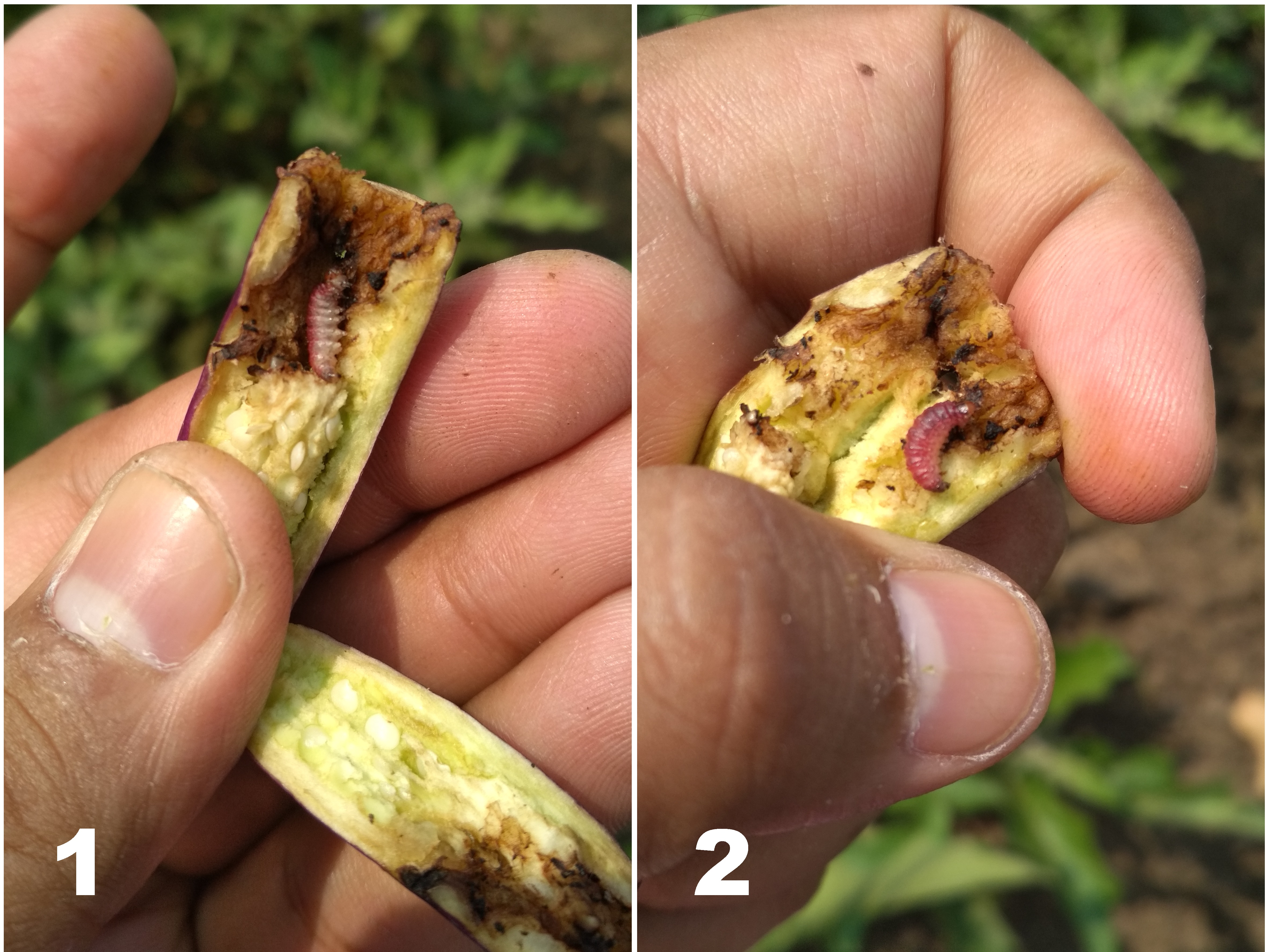
A later instar causing damage in a brinjal fruit by feeding

== See also ==
- List of moths of Australia (Pyralidae)

== Sources ==
This article incorporates text from a free content work. Licensed under CC BY-SA (license statement/permission). Text taken from Plantwise Factsheets for Farmers: Fruit and shoot borer of brinjal - Bangladesh, Md. Rafiquzzaman, Zahidul Islam, M. Anwar Hossain, CABI.

This article incorporates text from a free content work. Licensed under CC BY-SA (license statement/permission). Text taken from PMDG: Fruit/shoot borer on eggplant - Ghana, Benjamin K. Badii, Hannah Nuamah, Harunah Braimah, Antony Cudjoe, Maxwell Awuku, CABI.

This article incorporates text from a free content work. Licensed under CC BY-SA (license statement/permission). Text taken from PMDG: Fruit and shoot borer of brinjal, Ratna Kumar Jha (NPQP), Parshu Ram Rawat (RPPL, Nepalgunj), NareshDangi (NARC), CABI.

This article incorporates text from a free content work. Licensed under CC BY-SA (license statement/permission). Text taken from PMDG: Brinjal fruit and shoot borer - India, Mr. Nilesh Ganesh Patkar, Dr. Raja.Ramesh, CABI.

This article incorporates text from a free content work. Licensed under CC BY-SA (license statement/permission). Text taken from PMDG: Fruit and shoot borer of brinjal - Sri Lanka, K.P. Somachandra, M. S. K. K Perera, T. K. A. I. Hadji and K. Thanabalasingam, CABI.

This article incorporates text from a free content work. Licensed under CC BY-SA (license statement/permission). Text taken from PMDG Green list: Eggplant fruit and shoot borer, Plantwise, CABI.

This article incorporates text from a free content work. Licensed under CC BY-SA (license statement/permission). Text taken from PMDG: Fruit and Shoot Borer on African Eggplant - Uganda, Fred Muzira (Department of Crop Protection, MAAIF) and Idd Ramathani (NARO), CABI.
