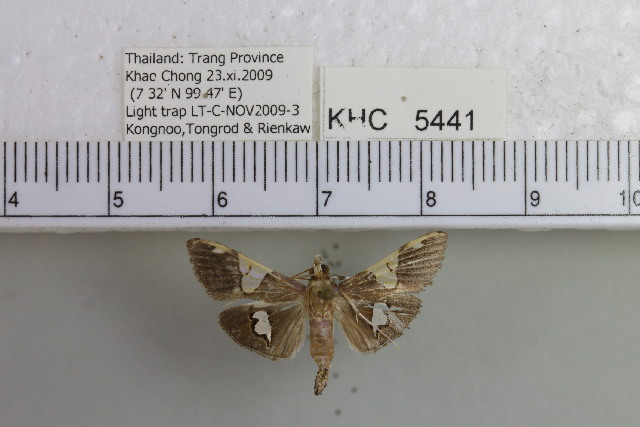

Scientific classification
- Kingdom: Animalia
- Phylum: Arthropoda
- Class: Insecta
- Order: Lepidoptera
- Family: Crambidae
- Genus: Heterocnephes
- Species: H. lymphatalis

Binomial name
- Heterocnephes lymphatalis (C. Swinhoe, 1889)

Synonyms
- Nosophora lymphatalis C. Swinhoe, 1889

= Heterocnephes lymphatalis =

Species of moth

Heterocnephes lymphatalis is a moth in the family Crambidae. It was described by Charles Swinhoe in 1889. It is found in China, Thailand, Cambodia, Peninsular Malaysia, north-eastern India and Myanmar, as well as on the Mollucas, Borneo, Sulawesi and Java.

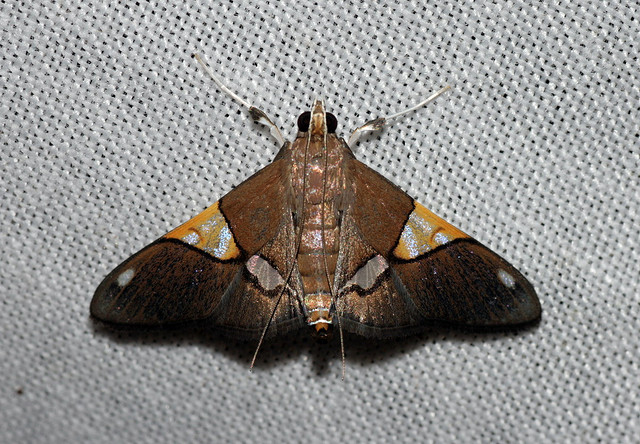
Borneo, Crocker Range National Park
