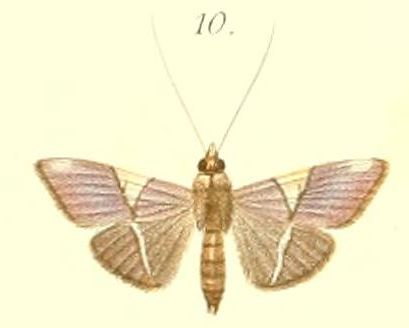

Scientific classification
- Domain: Eukaryota
- Kingdom: Animalia
- Phylum: Arthropoda
- Class: Insecta
- Order: Lepidoptera
- Family: Crambidae
- Genus: Heterocnephes
- Species: H. scapulalis

Binomial name
- Heterocnephes scapulalis Lederer, 1863

= Heterocnephes scapulalis =

Species of moth

Heterocnephes scapulalis is a moth of the family Crambidae. It is found on Ambon, Peninsular Malaysia and New Guinea.
