= Charitoprepes apicipicta =

Scientific classification
- Kingdom: Animalia
- Phylum: Arthropoda
- Clade: Pancrustacea
- Class: Insecta
- Order: Lepidoptera
- Family: Crambidae
- Genus: Charitoprepes
- Species: C. apicipicta

Binomial name
- Charitoprepes apicipicta Inoue, 1963

Species of moth

Charitoprepes apicipicta is a moth in the family Crambidae. It was described by Hiroshi Inoue in 1963 in the genus Heterocnephes, and was later moved to its current genus. The species is found in Japan (Honshu), China and Korea.

The wingspan is 21–24 mm. Adults are flying from May to June and again from August to September in two generations in Japan.
