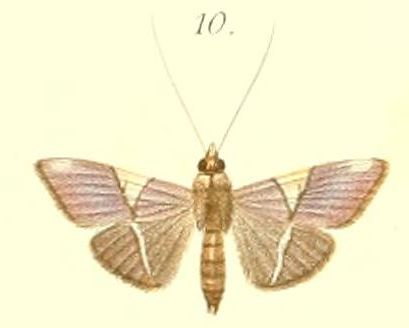
- Heterocnephes scapulalis

Scientific classification
- Kingdom: Animalia
- Phylum: Arthropoda
- Clade: Pancrustacea
- Class: Insecta
- Order: Lepidoptera
- Family: Crambidae
- Tribe: Margaroniini
- Genus: Heterocnephes; Lederer, 1863

Type species
- Heterocnephes scapulalis Lederer, 1863

= Heterocnephes =

Genus of moths

Heterocnephes is a genus of moths of the family Crambidae.

== Species ==
- Heterocnephes apicipicta Inoue, 1963
- Heterocnephes delicata Swinhoe, 1917
- Heterocnephes lymphatalis (Swinhoe, 1889)
- Heterocnephes scapulalis Lederer, 1863
- Heterocnephes vicinalis Snellen, 1880
