= Heterocnephes vicinalis =

Scientific classification
- Kingdom: Animalia
- Phylum: Arthropoda
- Class: Insecta
- Order: Lepidoptera
- Family: Crambidae
- Genus: Heterocnephes
- Species: H. vicinalis

Binomial name
- Heterocnephes vicinalis Snellen, 1880

Species of moth

Heterocnephes vicinalis is a moth in the family Crambidae. It was described by Snellen in 1880. It is found on Sumatra.
