= Heterocnephes delicata =

Scientific classification
- Domain: Eukaryota
- Kingdom: Animalia
- Phylum: Arthropoda
- Class: Insecta
- Order: Lepidoptera
- Family: Crambidae
- Genus: Heterocnephes
- Species: H. delicata

Binomial name
- Heterocnephes delicata C. Swinhoe, 1917

Species of moth

Heterocnephes delicata is a moth in the family Crambidae. It was described by Charles Swinhoe in 1917. It is found in Papua New Guinea.
