= Charitoprepes =

Scientific classification
- Kingdom: Animalia
- Phylum: Arthropoda
- Class: Insecta
- Order: Lepidoptera
- Family: Crambidae
- Subfamily: Spilomelinae
- Tribe: Margaroniini
- Genus: Charitoprepes; Warren, 1896

Type species
- Charitoprepes lubricosa Warren, 1896

Genus of moths

Charitoprepes is a genus of moths of the family Crambidae. It is placed in the species-rich tribe Margaroniini in the subfamily Spilomelinae.

The genus currently contains three species:

- C. lubricosa Warren, 1896, the type species of the genus; it is known from the Indian Khasi Hills, Korea, Japan, China and Taiwan;
- C. apicipicta (Inoue, 1963), occurring in China, Japan and Korea;
- C. aciculata Huang & Du, 2023, which is so far only known from the southern Chinese Hainan and Yunnan provinces.
