= Charitoprepes lubricosa =

Scientific classification
- Kingdom: Animalia
- Phylum: Arthropoda
- Clade: Pancrustacea
- Class: Insecta
- Order: Lepidoptera
- Family: Crambidae
- Genus: Charitoprepes
- Species: C. lubricosa

Binomial name
- Charitoprepes lubricosa Warren, 1896

Species of moth

Charitoprepes lubricosa is a moth in the species-rich subfamily Spilomelinae of the family Crambidae. It was described by William Warren in 1896 as the type species of the genus Charitoprepes. The species is known from its type locality in the Indian Khasi Hills as well as from Japan and Korea.

The wingspan is 32 mm. The forewings are of a brown ground colour and exhibit an elongate dark brown spot in the apex, and feature two dark brown stigmata below the lighter brown costa. The hindwings are of a lighter brown ground colour than the forewings, and they exhibit a darker brown discal spot. In Japan, adults can be found flying in the months of May to September. The food plants of the caterpillars are still unknown.
