= List of Lepidoptera of Telangana =

The Lepidoptera of Telangana consists of the butterflies and moths recorded in the state. These species have been recorded from surveys and citizen science platforms like iNaturalist. A total of 181 species of butterfly and 455 species of moth (and one currently undescribed species) have been recorded from Telangana.

The state butterfly of Telangana is yet to be decided, with the three main options being Delias eucharis (common Jezebel), Danaus genutia (common tiger) and Papilio crino (common banded peacock swallowtail).

== Butterflies ==
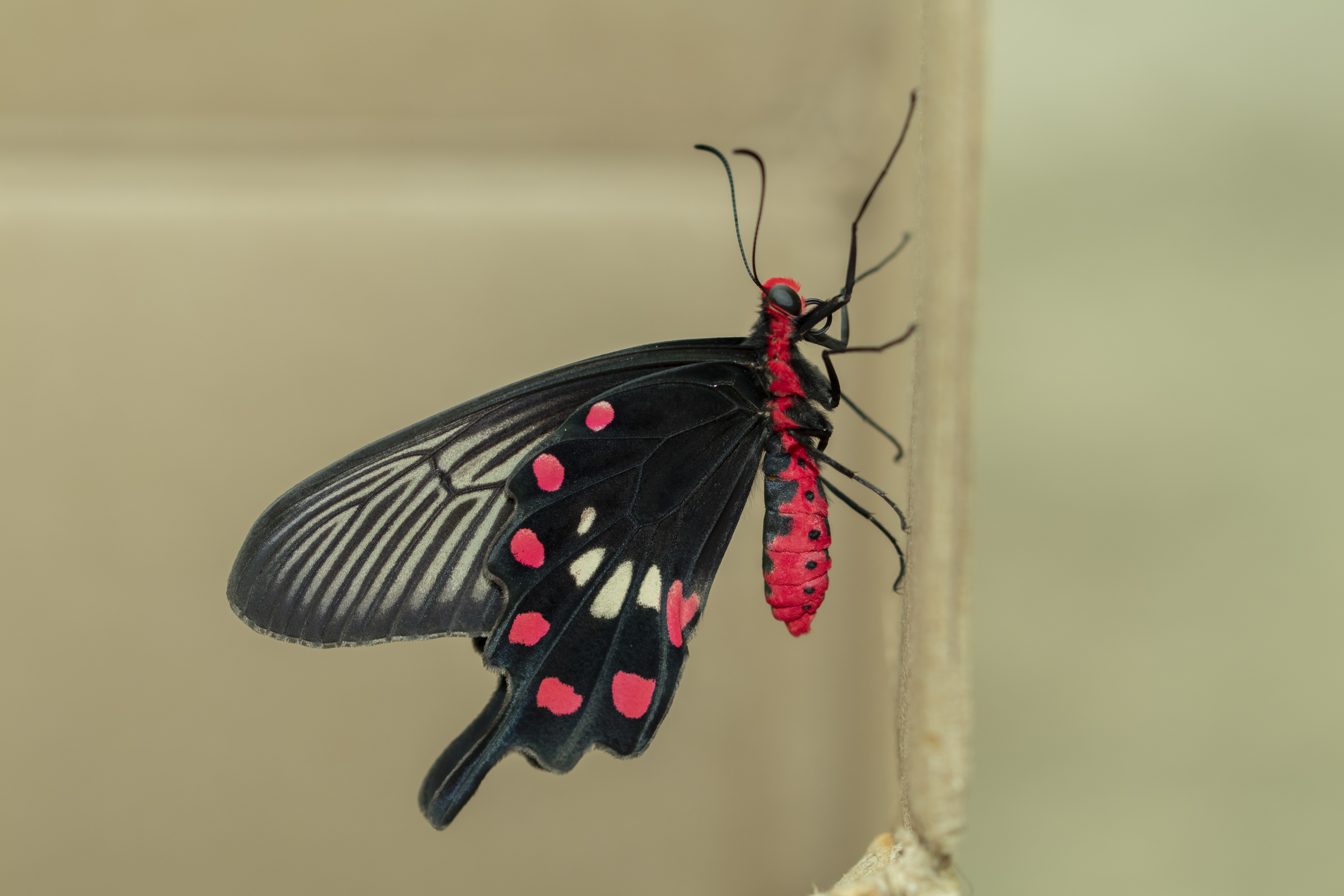
Pachliopta aristolochiae

=== Papilionidae ===
- Graphium agamemnon – tailed jay
- Graphium doson – common jay
- Graphium nomius – spot swordtail
- Pachliopta aristolochiae – common rose
- Pachliopta hector – crimson rose
- Papilio agenor – great mormon
- Papilio clytia – common mime
- Papilio crino – common banded peacock swallowtail
- Papilio demoleus – lime swallowtail
- Papilio helenus – red helen swallowtail
- Papilio paris – Paris peacock swallowtail
- Papilio polytes – common mormon swallowtail
- Troides minos – southern birdwing

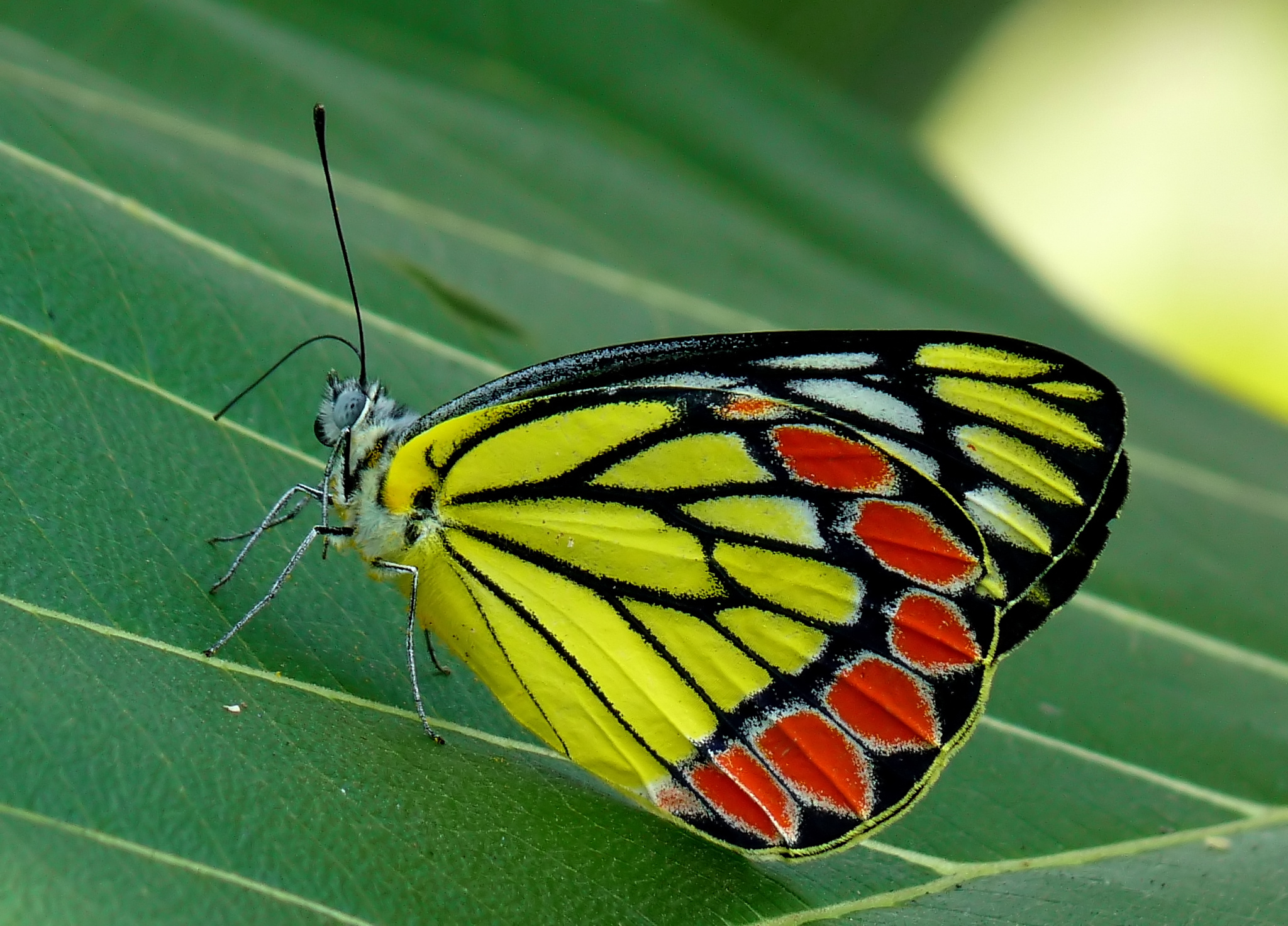
Delias eucharis

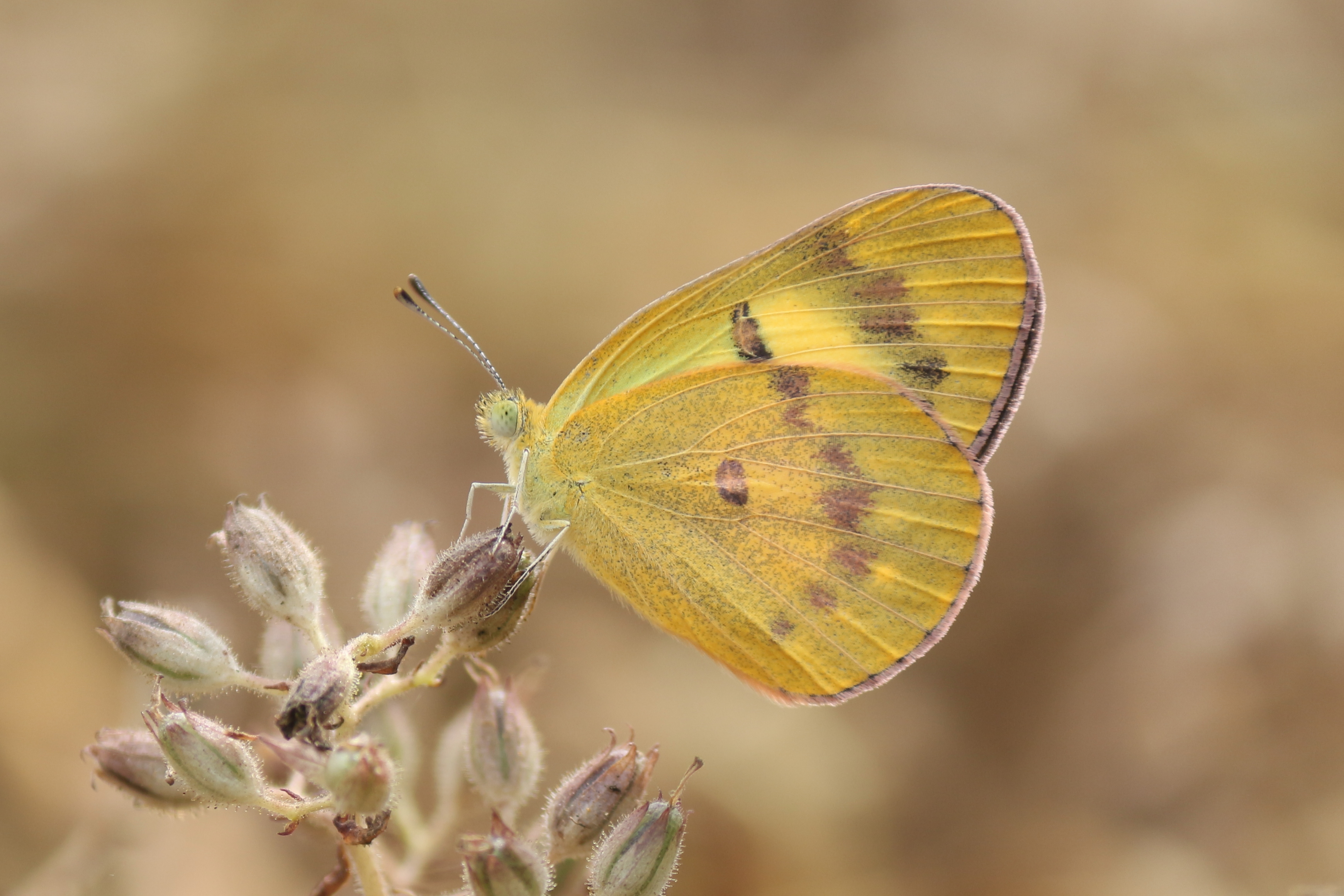
Colotis amata

=== Pieridae ===
- Appias albina – common albatross
- Appias libythea – striped albatross
- Belenois aurota – pioneer white
- Catopsilia pomona – lemon emigrant
- Catopsilia pyranthe – mottled emigrant
- Cepora nerissa – common gull
- Colotis amata – small salmon arab
- Colotis aurora – plain orange tip
- Colotis danae – banded scarlet tip
- Colotis etrida – little orange tip
- Colotis fausta – large salmon arab
- Delias eucharis – common jezebel
- Eurema andersonii – one-spot grass yellow
- Eurema blanda – three-spotted grass yellow
- Eurema brigitta – broad-bordered grass yellow
- Eurema hecabe – common grass yellow
- Eurema laeta – spotless grass yellow
- Leptosia nina – psyche
- Hebomoia glaucippe – great orange tip
- Ixias marianne – white orange tip
- Ixias pyrene – yellow orange tip
- Pareronia hippia – Indian wanderer
- Pareronia ceylanica – dark wanderer
- Pieris canidia – Indian cabbage white

=== Riodinidae ===
- Abisara bifasciata – double-banded Judy

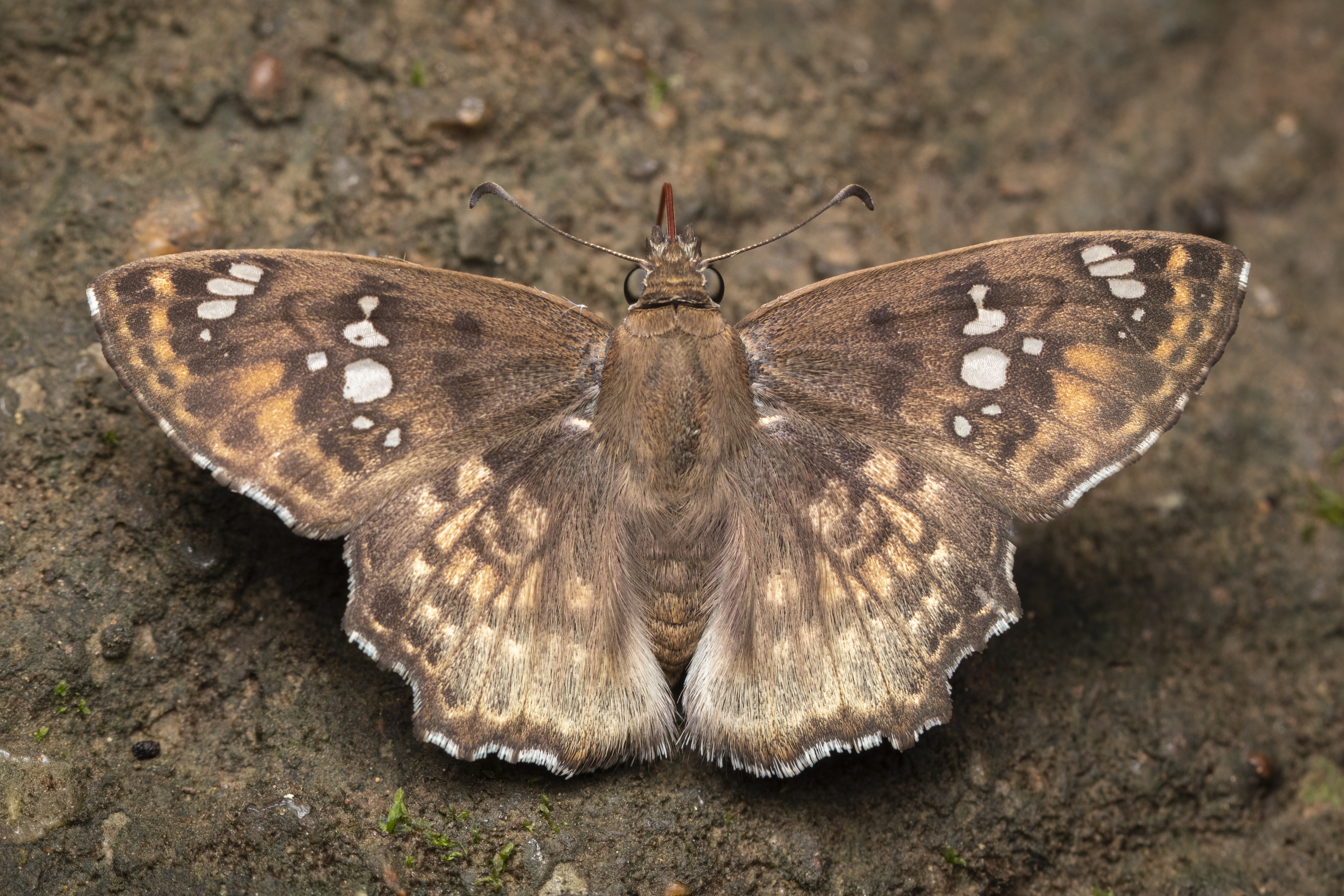
Caprona ransonnetii

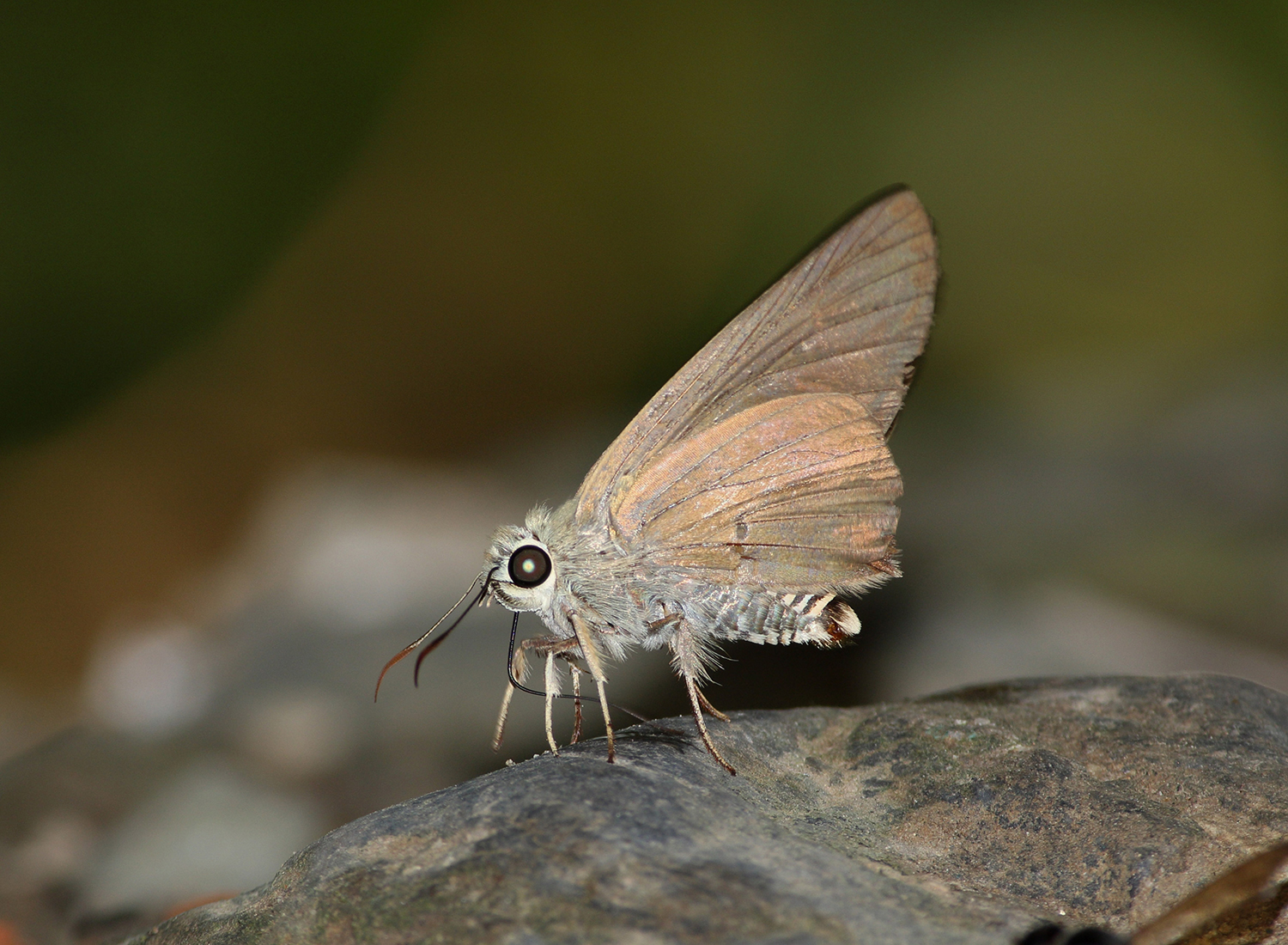
Badamia exclamationis

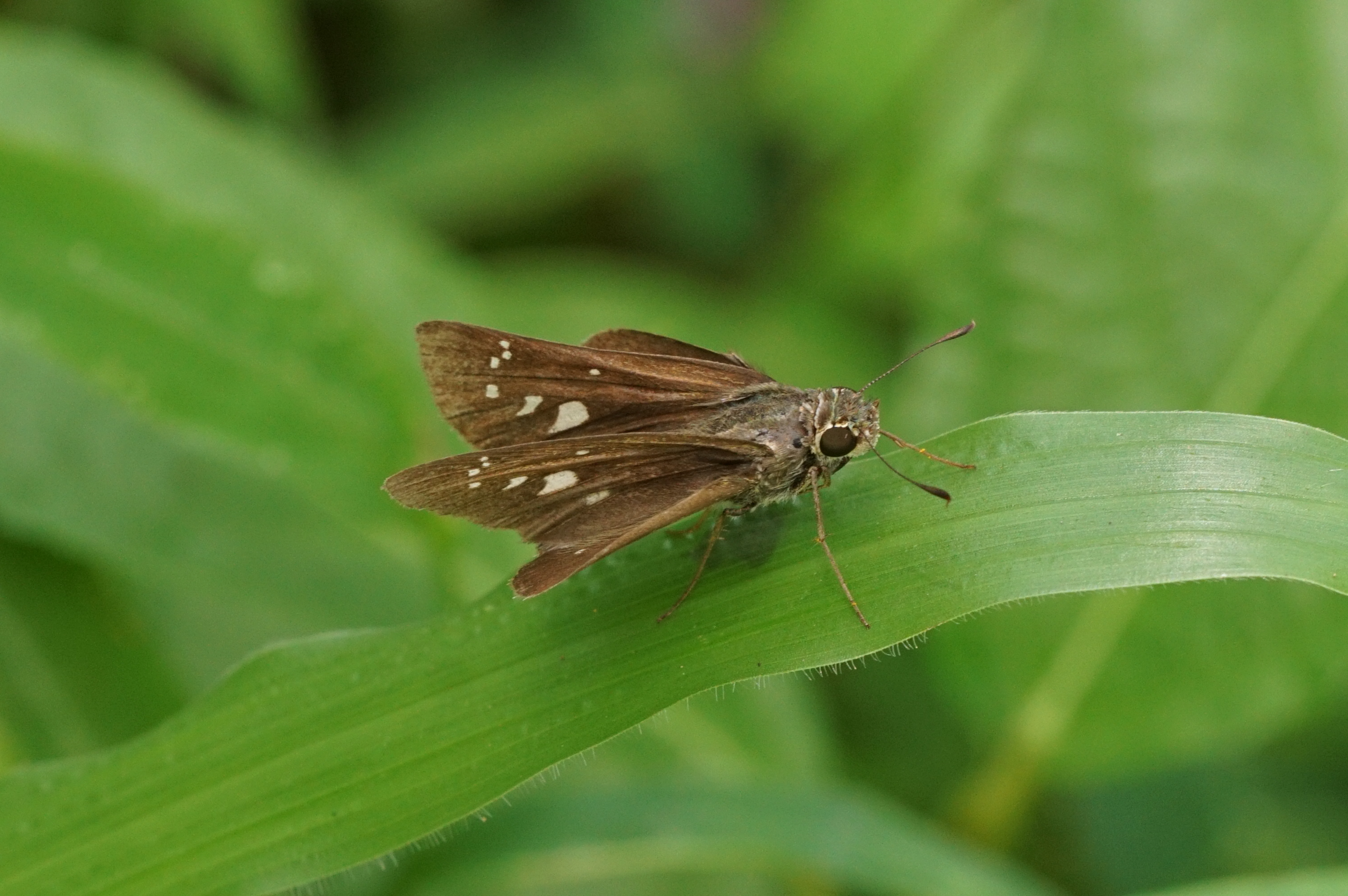
Parnara bada

=== Hesperiidae ===
- Aeromachus dubius – dingy scrub hopper
- Ampittia dioscoroides – common bush hopper
- Badamia exclamationis – brown awl
- Baoris farri – paintbrush swift
- Borbo cinnara – rice swift
- Caprona agama – spotted angle
- Caprona ransonnettii – golden angle
- Celaenorrhinus leucocera – common spotted flat
- Celaenorrhinus ambareesa – Malabar spotted flat
- Coladenia indrani – tricolour pied flat
- Gangara thyrsis – giant redeye
- Gomalia elma – green-marbled skipper
- Halpe porus – Moore's ace
- Hasora badra – common awl
- Hasora chromus – common banded awl
- Iambrix salsala – chestnut bob
- Matapa aria – common redeye
- Notocrypta curvifascia – restricted demon
- Notocrypta paralysos – common banded demon
- Parnara bada – oriental straight swift
- Parnara ganga – continental swift
- Pelopidas agna – little branded swift
- Pelopidas conjuncta – conjoined swift
- Pelopidas mathias – small branded swift
- Pelopidas subochracea – large branded swift
- Potanthus pseudomaesa – Indian dart
- Pseudocoladenia dan – fulvous pied flat
- Spialia galba – Asian grizzled skipper
- Suastus gremius – Indian palm bob
- Tagiades gana – suffused snow flat
- Tapena thwaitesi – black angle
- Telicota bambusae – dark palm dart
- Udaspes folus – grass demon

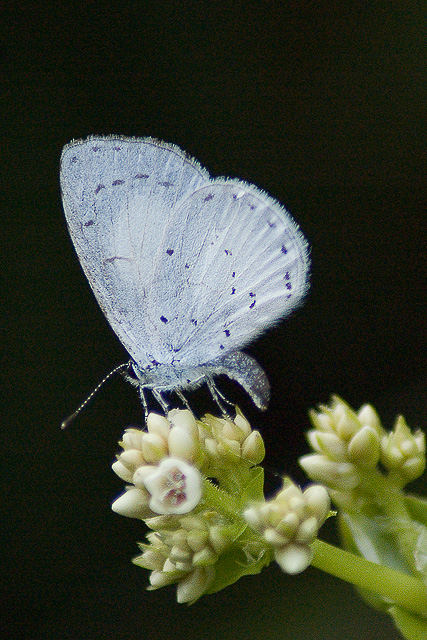
Udara akasa

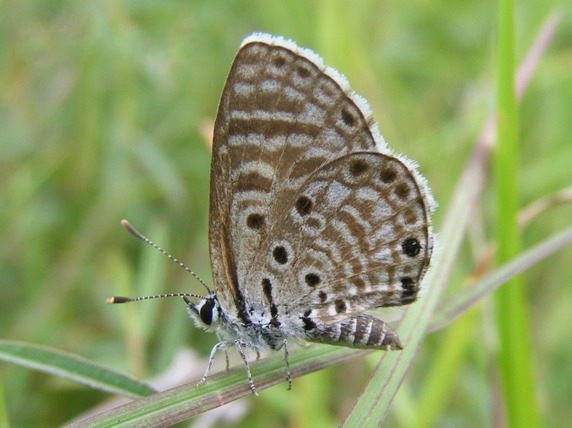
Azanus jesous

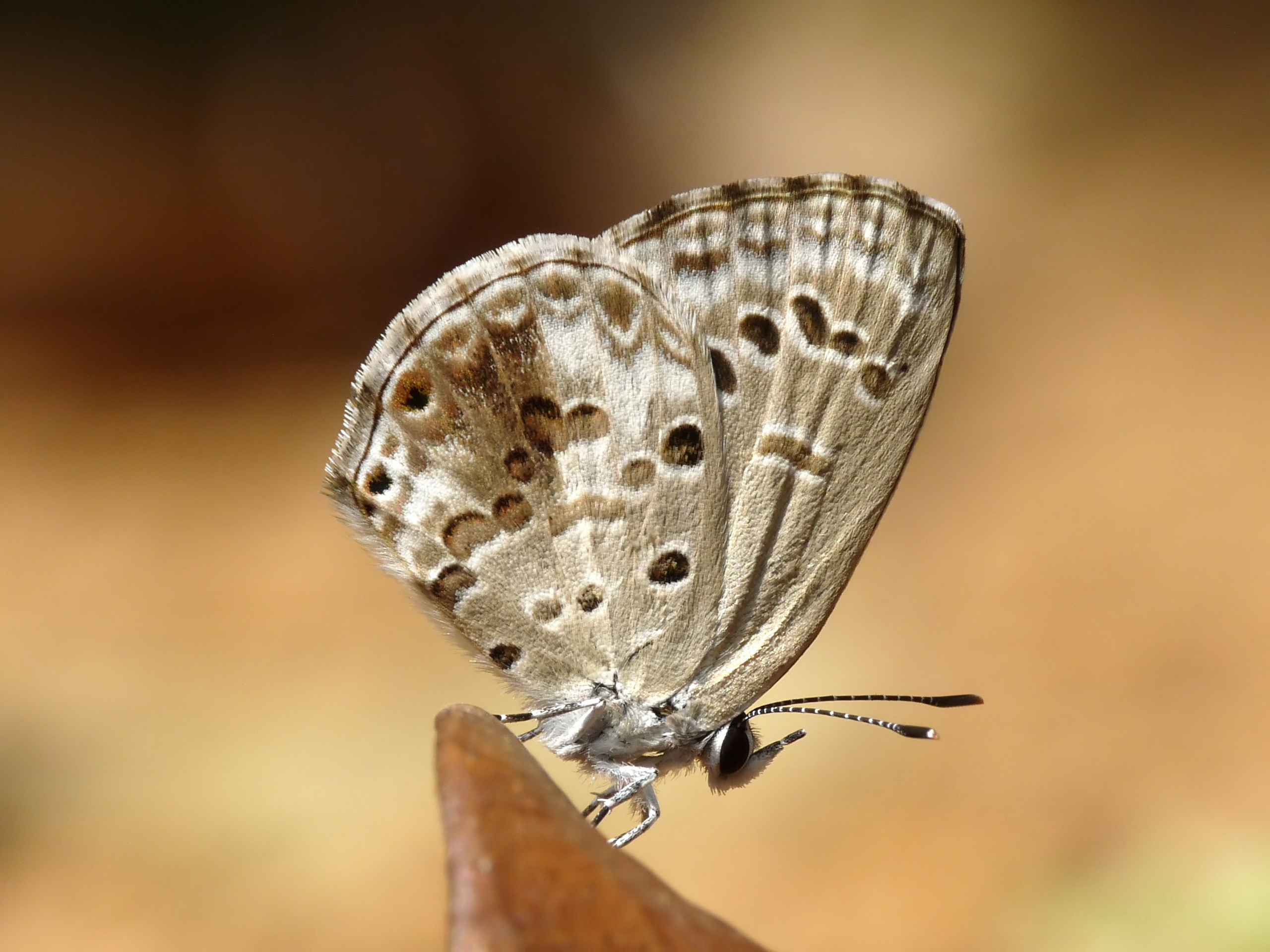
Chilades lajus

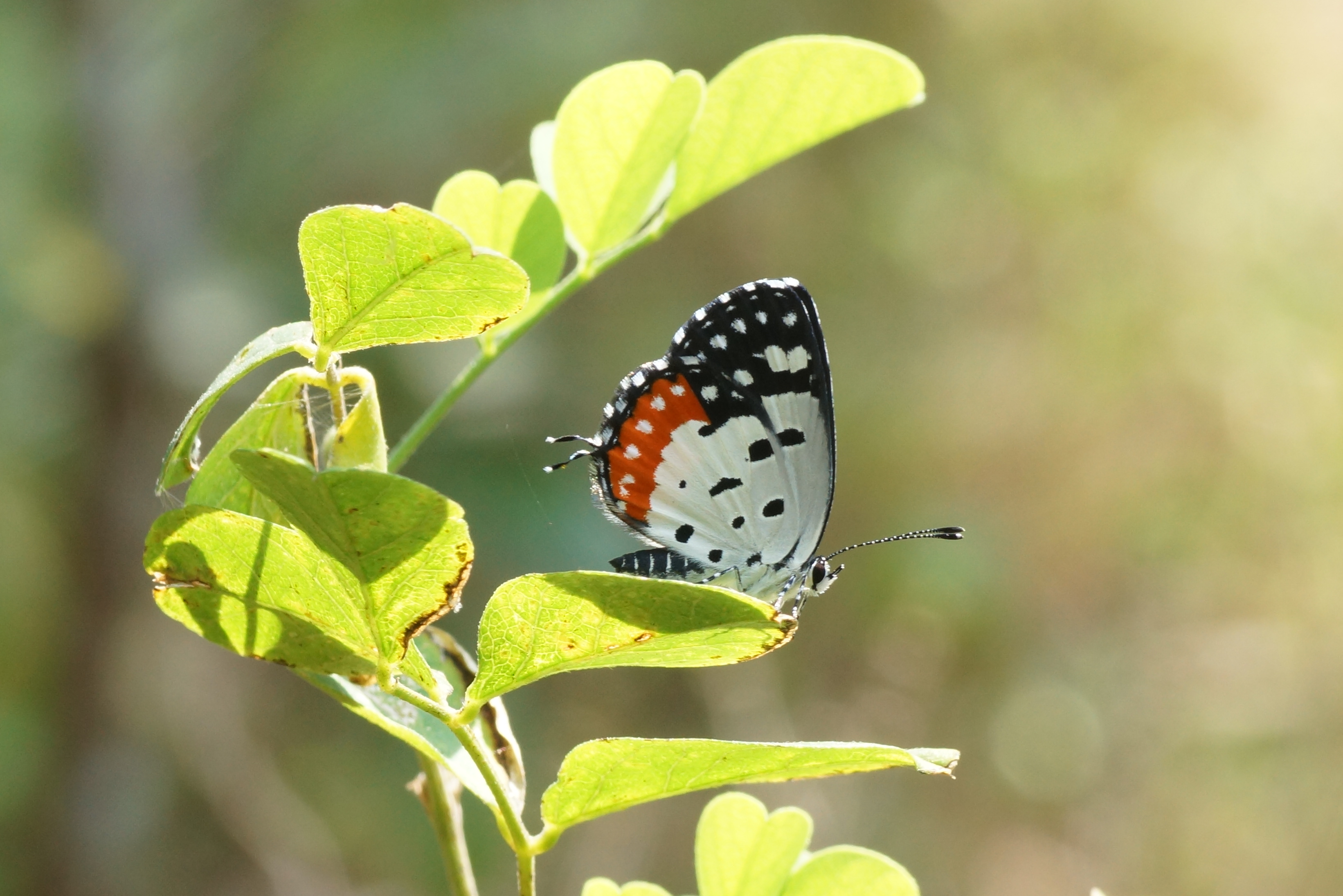
Talicada nyseus

=== Lycaenidae ===
- Acytolepis puspa – common hedge blue
- Amblypodia anita – purple leaf blue
- Anthene emolus – common ciliate blue
- Anthene lycaenina – pointed ciliate blue
- Arhopala amantes – large oakblue
- Arhopala centaurus – dull oakblue
- Azanus jesous – African babul blue
- Azanus ubaldus – bright babul blue
- Azanus uranus – dull babul blue
- Caleta decidia – angled pierrot
- Caleta elna – elbowed pierrot
- Castalius rosimon – common pierrot
- Catochrysops strabo – forget-me-not
- Chilades lajus – lime blue
- Chilades parrhasius – small cupid
- Cigaritis elima – scarce shot silverline
- Cigaritis ictis – common shot silverline
- Cigaritis schistacea – plumbeous silverline
- Cigaritis vulcanus – common silverline
- Chilades lajus – lime blue
- Chilades parrhasius – small cupid
- Curetis acuta – angled sunbeam
- Curetis thetis – Indian sunbeam
- Discolampa ethion – banded blue pierrot
- Euchrysops cnejus – gram blue
- Everes lacturnus – orange-tipped peablue
- Freyeria putli – jewelled grass-blue
- Freyeria trochylus – grass jewel
- Jamides alecto – metallic cerulean
- Jamides bochus – dark cerulean
- Jamides celeno – common cerulean
- Lampides boeticus – peablue
- Leptotes plinius – zebra blue
- Loxura atmynus – common yamfly
- Luthrodes pandava – plains cupid
- Megisba malaya – Malayan
- Petrelaea dana – dingy lineblue
- Prosotas dubiosa – tailless lineblue
- Prosotas nora – common lineblue
- Prosotas noreia – white-tipped lineblue
- Pseudozizeeria maha – pale grass blue
- Rapala iarbus – common red flash
- Rapala varuna – indigo flash
- Rathinda amor – monkey puzzle
- Spalgis epius – apefly
- Tajuria cippus – peacock royal
- Tajuria jehana – plains blue royal
- Talicada nyseus – red Pierrot
- Tarucus balkanica – little tiger pierrot
- Tarucus nara – spotted Pierrot
- Udara akasa – white hedge blue
- Virachola isocrates – common guava blue
- Virachola perse – large guava blue
- Zinaspa todara – silver-streaked acacia blue
- Zizeeria karsandra – dark grass blue
- Zizina otis – lesser grass blue
- Zizula hylax – tiny grass blue

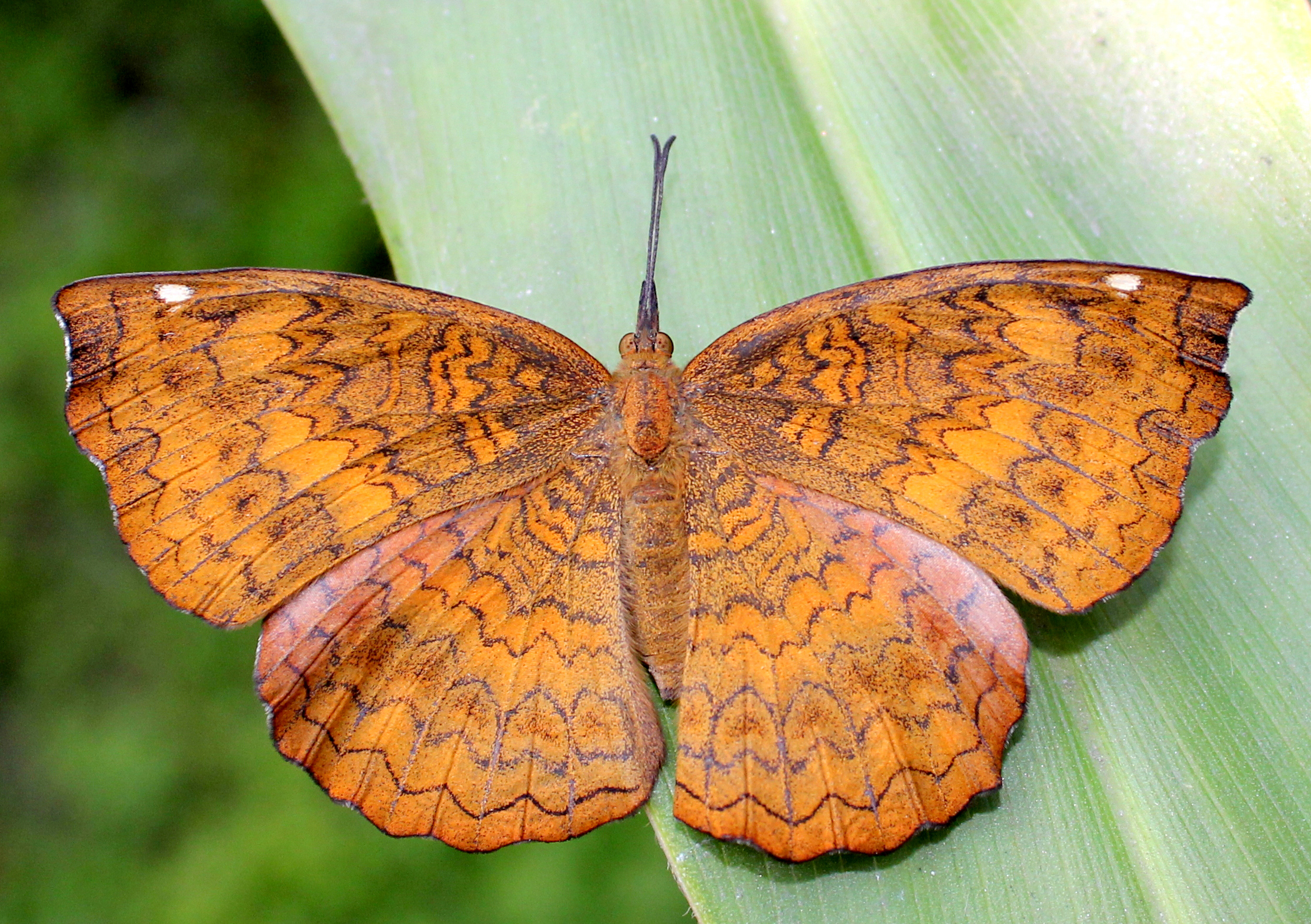
Ariadne merione

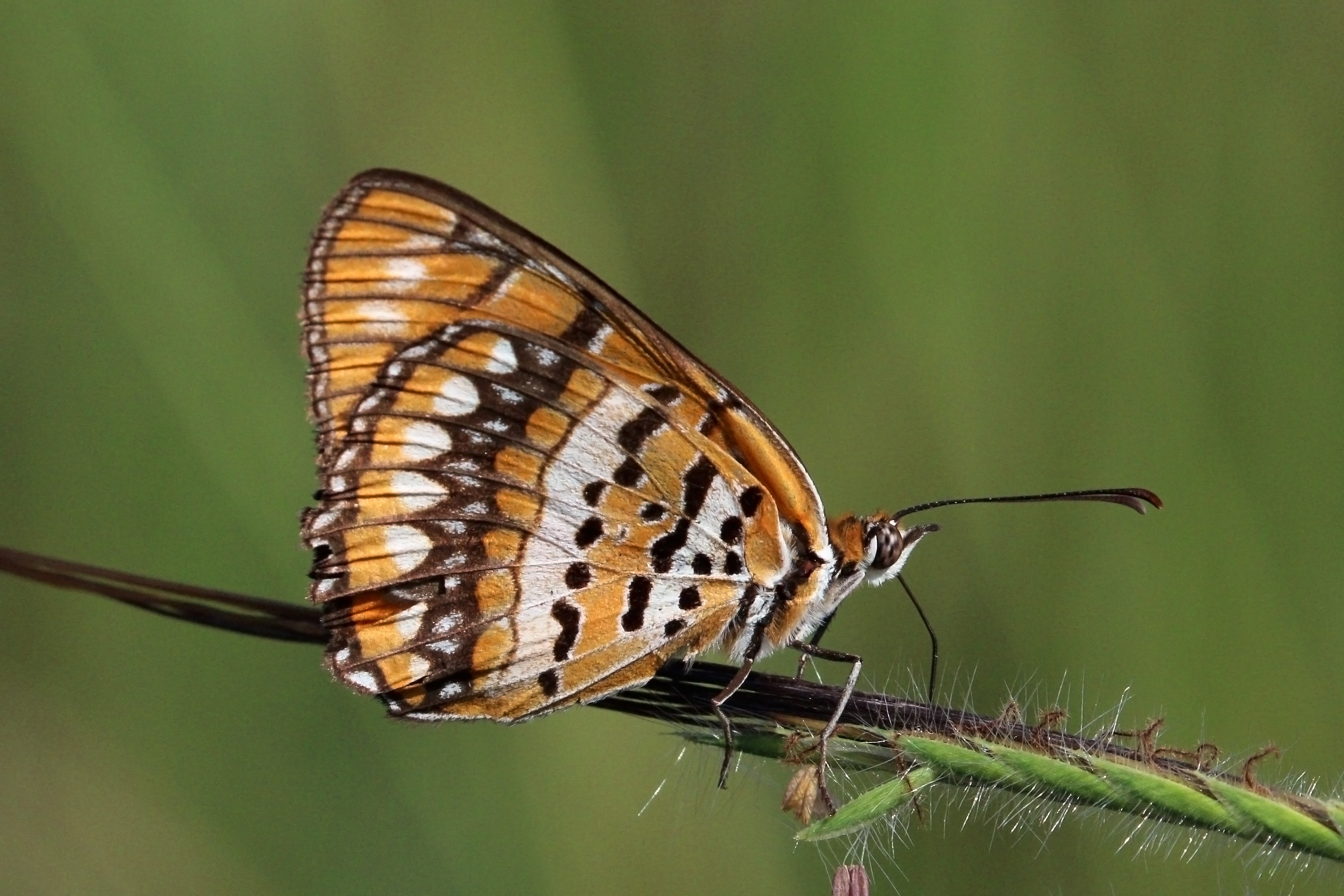
Byblia ilithyia

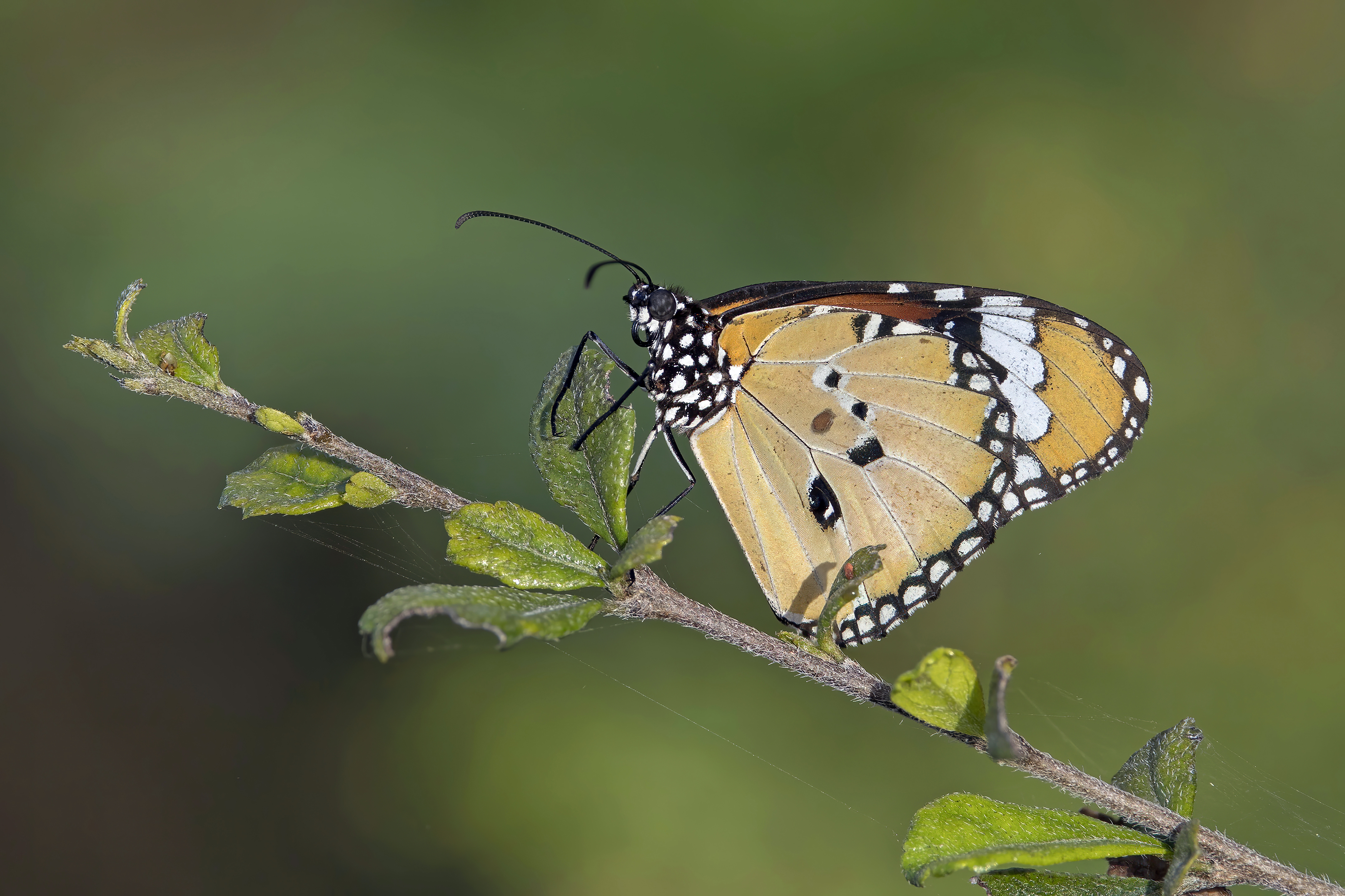
Danaus chrysippus

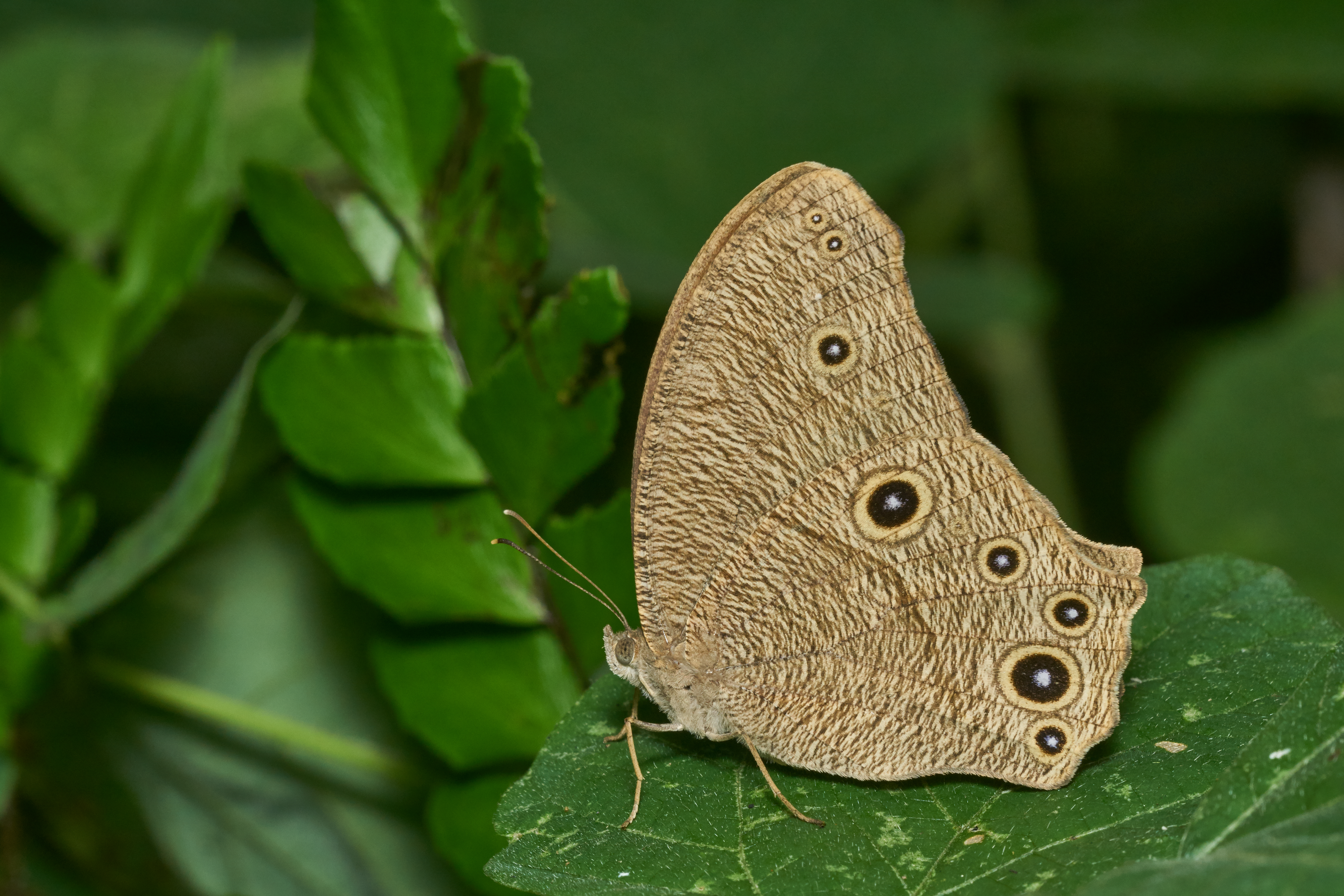
Melanitis leda

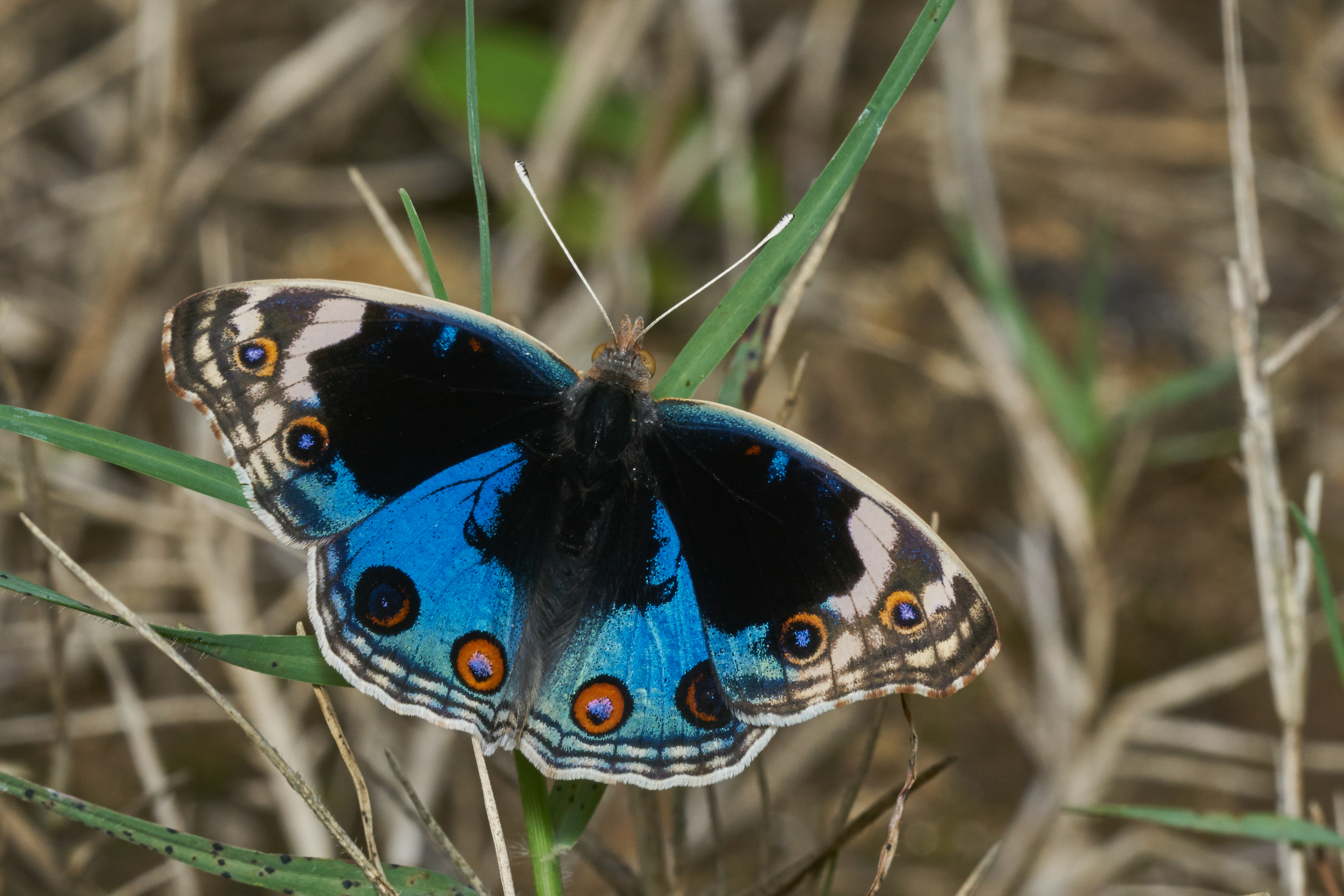
Junonia orithya

=== Nymphalidae ===
- Acraea terpsicore – tawny coster
- Ariadne ariadne – angled castor
- Ariadne merione – common castor
- Athyma inara – colour sergeant
- Athyma perius – common sergeant
- Byblia ilithya – spotted joker
- Charaxes bernardus – tawny rajah
- Charaxes psaphon – plain tawny rajah
- Danaus chrysippus – plain tiger
- Danaus genutia – common tiger
- Elymnias hypermnestra – common palmfly
- Eriboea solon – black rajah
- Euploea core – common crow
- Euploea klugii – brown king crow
- Euploea mulciber – striped blue crow
- Euploea sylvester – double-branded crow
- Euthalia aconthea – common baron
- Euthalia nais – baronet
- Hypolimnas bolina – great eggfly
- Hypolimnas misippus – danaid eggfly
- Junonia almana – peacock pansy
- Junonia atlites – grey pansy
- Junonia hierta – yellow pansy
- Junonia iphita – chocolate pansy
- Junonia lemonias – lemon pansy
- Junonia orithya – blue pansy
- Kallima inachus – orange oakleaf
- Lasippa viraja – yellowjack sailer
- Lethe europa – bamboo treebrown
- Lethe rohria – common treebrown
- Libythea laius – lobed beak
- Melanitis leda – common evening brown
- Melanitis phedima – dark evening brown
- Moduza procris – commander
- Mycalesis mineus – dark brand bushbrown
- Mycalesis perseus – dingy bushbrown
- Mycalesis subdita – Tamil bushbrown
- Neptis hylas – common sailer
- Neptis jumbah – chestnut-streaked sailer
- Orsotriaena medus – smooth-eyed bushbrown
- Pantoporia hordonia – common lascar
- Parantica aglea – glassy tiger
- Phaedyma columella – short banded sailer
- Phalanta phalantha – common leopard
- Polyura agraria – anomalous nawab
- Polyura bharata – Indian nawab
- Symbrenthia lilaea – common jester
- Tanaecia lepidea – grey count
- Tirumala limniace – blue tiger
- Tirumala septentrionis – dark blue tiger
- Vanessa cardui – painted lady
- Ypthima asterope – common threering
- Ypthima baldus – common fivering
- Ypthima huebneri – common fourring

== Moths ==
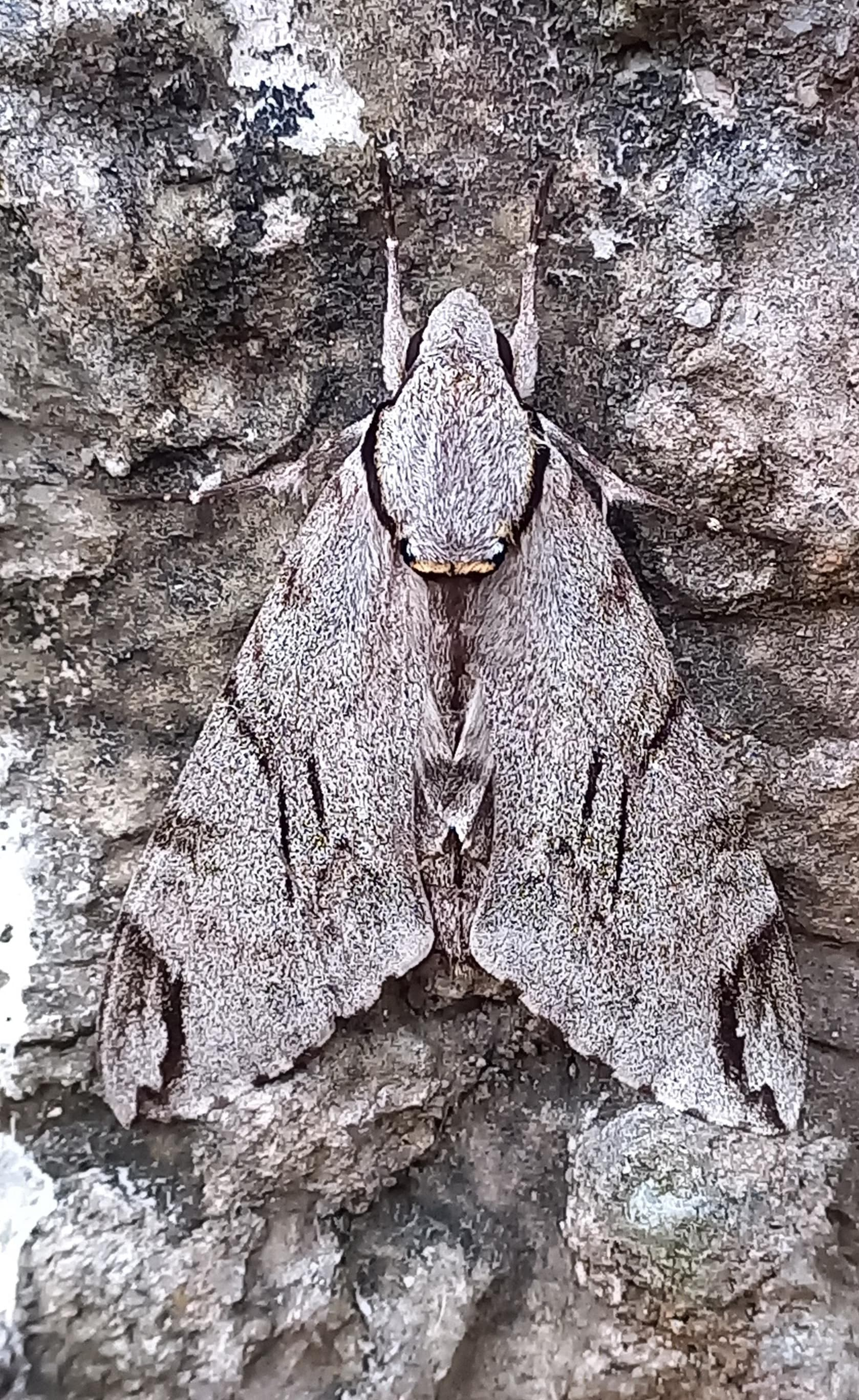
Psilogramma vates

=== Bombycoidea ===
- Acherontia lachesis
- Acherontia styx
- Actias selene
- Agrius convolvuli
- Ambulyx moorei
- Antheraea paphia
- Bombyx mori (cultivated)
- Cephonodes hylas
- Clanis phalaris
- Daphnis nerii
- Eupterote orientalis
- Eupterote undata
- Hippotion boerhaviae
- Hippotion celerio
- Hippotion rosetta
- Hyles livornica
- Marumba dyras
- Neogurelca hyas
- Nephele hespera
- Polyptychus dentatus
- Psilogramma increta
- Psilogramma vates
- Theretra alecto
- Theretra clotho
- Theretra nessus
- Theretra silhetensis
- Trilocha varians

=== Choreutoidea ===
- Choreutia orthogona
- Choreutia sexfasciella
- Brenthiinae spp.

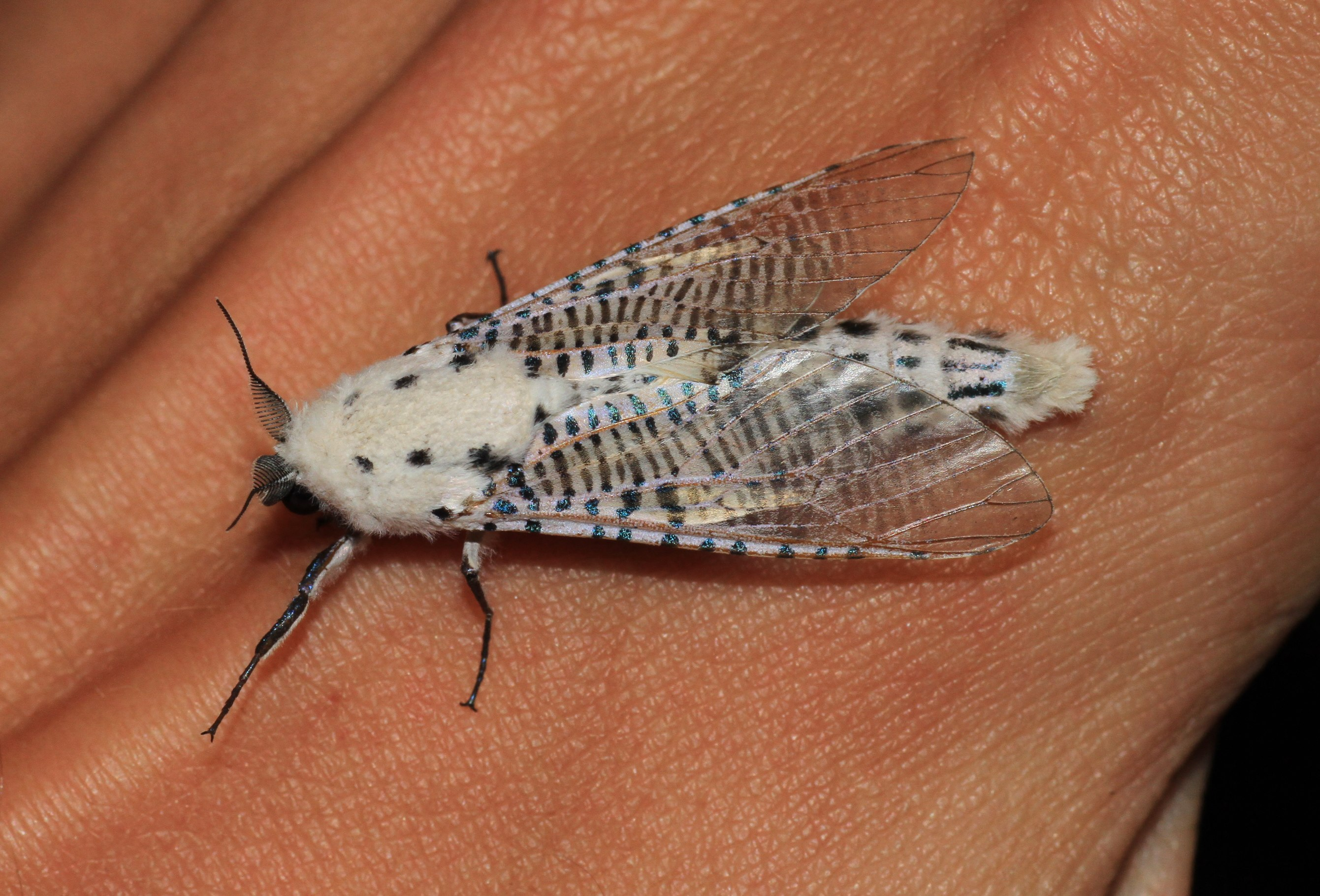
Polyphagozerra coffeae

=== Cossoidea ===
- Azygophleps pusilla
- Indarbela quadrinotata
- Phykodes radiata
- Polyphagozerra coffeae
- Xyleutes persona

=== Drepanoidea ===
- Cyclidia substigmaria

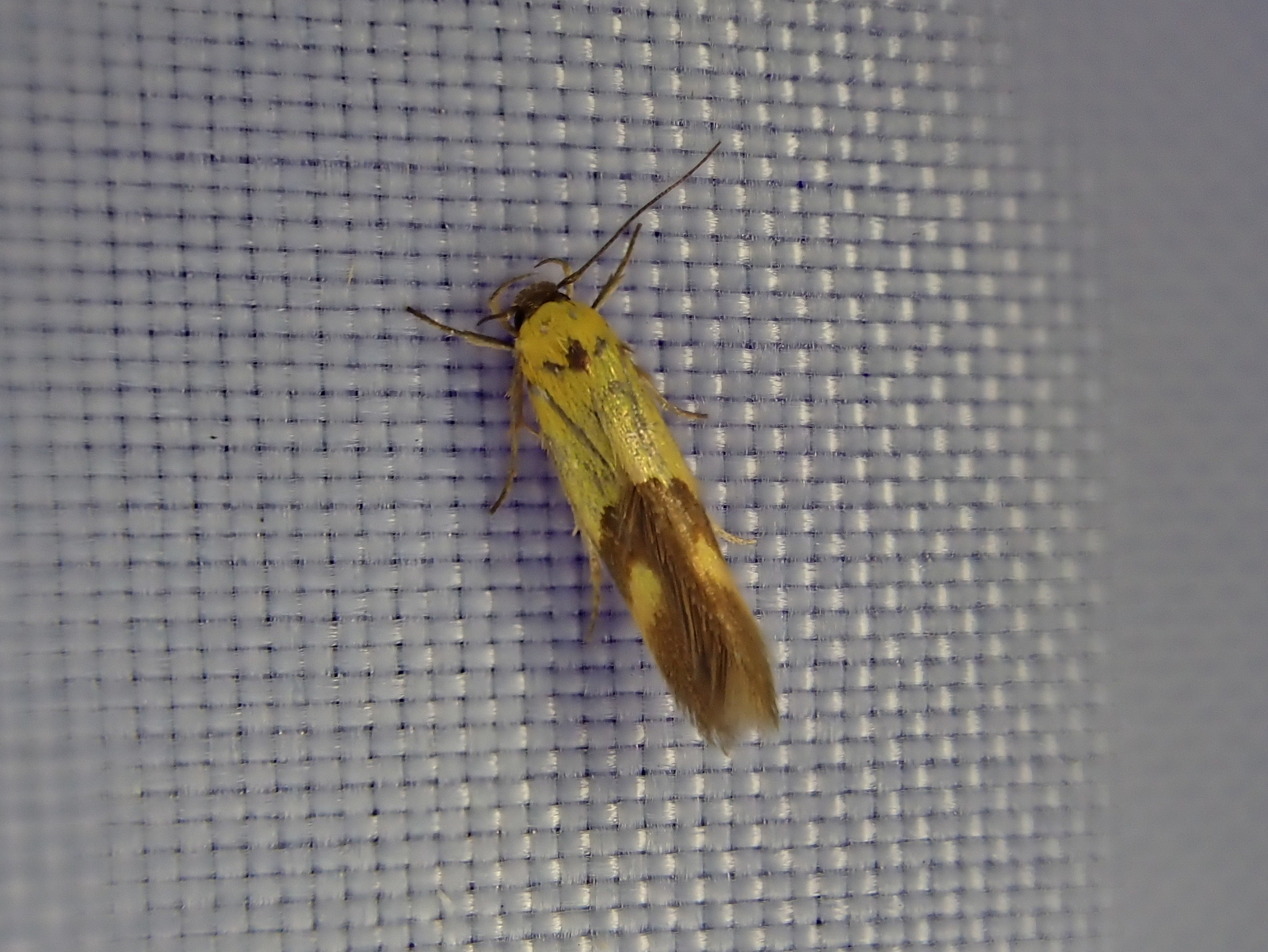
Stathmopoda auriferella

=== Gelechioidea ===
- Alciphanes clavata
- Ascalenia spp.
- Blastobasis spp.
- Deltophora spp.
- Dichomeris anisacuminata
- Eretmocera spp.
- Faristenia spp.
- Homaloxestis spp.
- Labdia spp.
- Macrobathra spp.
- Mesophleps spp.
- Odites ricinella
- Polyhymno spp.
- Promalactis spp.
- Psilocorsis spp.
- Stagmatophora argyrostrepta
- Stathmopoda auriferella
- Stegasta spp.
- Torodora iresia

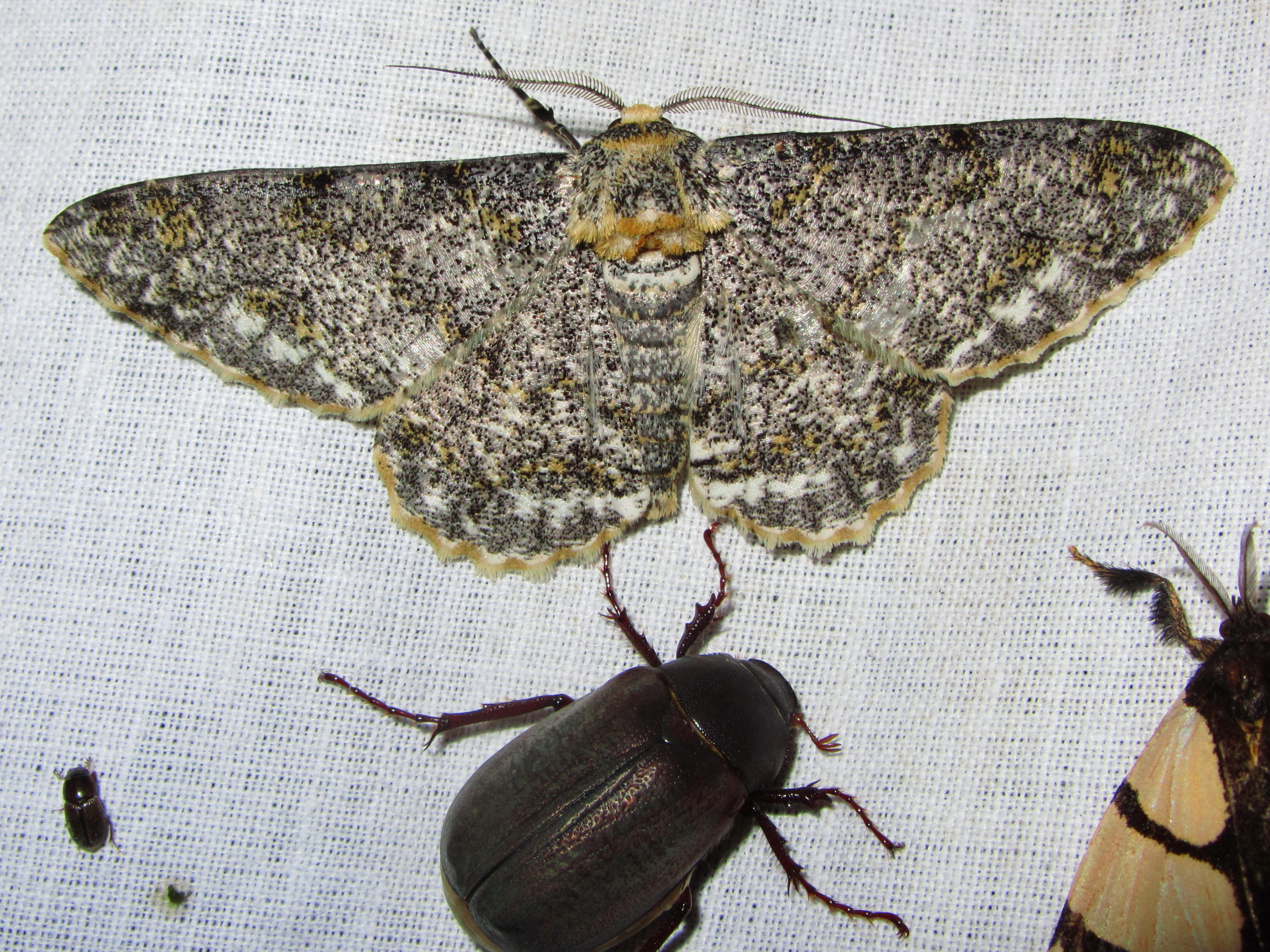
Biston suppressaria

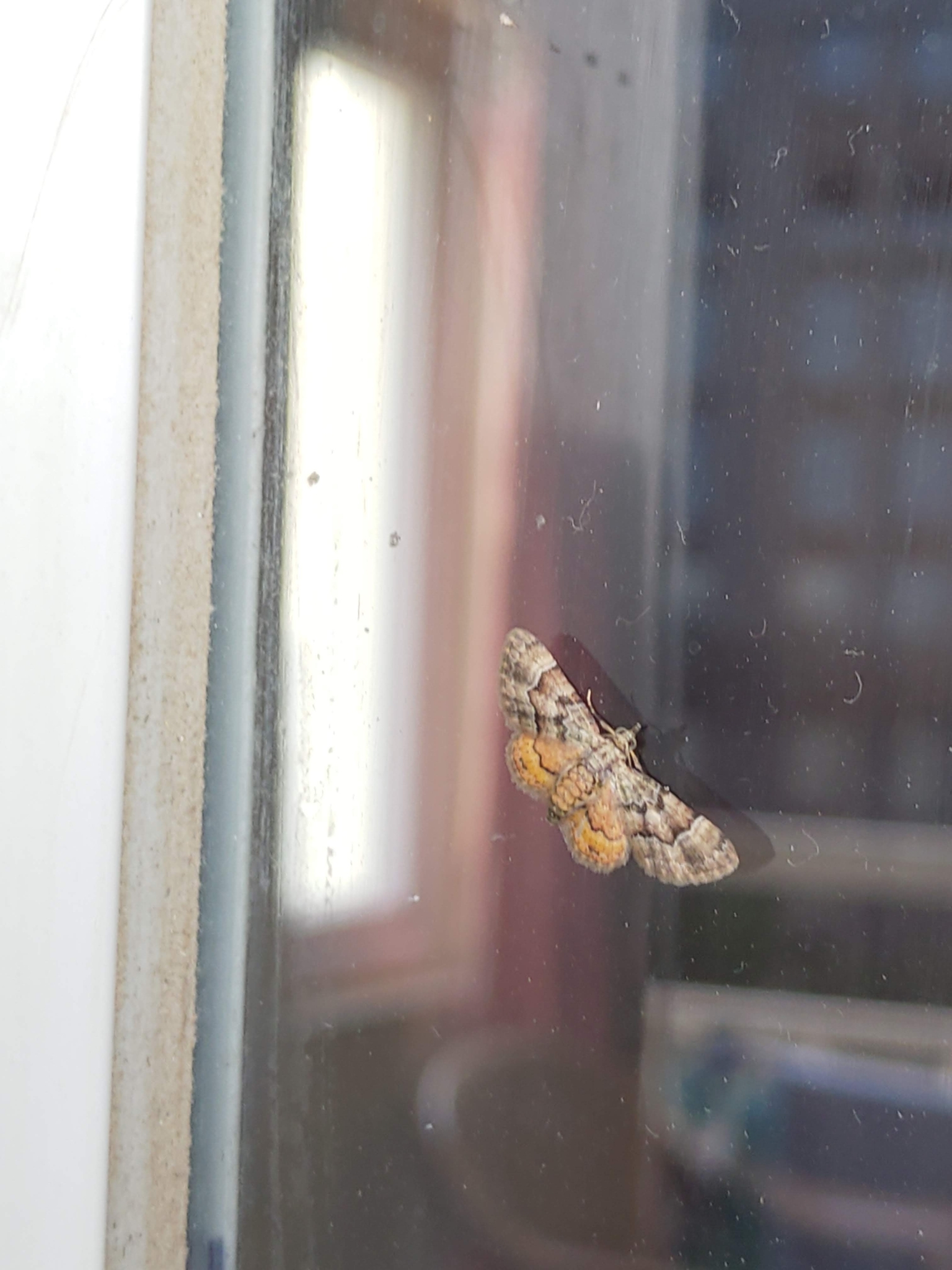
Glaucoclystis acygonia

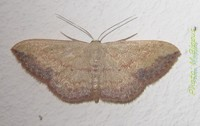
Scopula caesaria

=== Geometroidea ===
- Achrosis spp.
- Agathia laetata
- Anisephyra ocularia
- Argyrocosma inductaria
- Ascotis spp.
- Astygisa spp.
- Biston suppressaria
- Chiasmia emersaria
- Chiasmia fidoniata
- Chiasmia nora complex
- Chrysocraspeda faganaria
- Cleora cornaria
- Cleora injectaria
- Comibaena spp.
- Comostola pyrrhogona
- Cyclothea spp.
- Derambila spp.
- Epiplema spp.
- Glaucoclystis acygonia
- Gonodontis spp.
- Hyperythra lutea
- Hypomecis transcissa
- Hyposidra talaca
- Idaea amplipennis
- Idaea chotaria
- Idaea costiguttata
- Idaea macrospila
- Idaea violacearia
- Idiochlora spp.
- Isturgia disputaria
- Lophophleps phoenicoptera
- Microloxia indecretata
- Micronia aculeata
- Ophthalmitis caritaria
- Pelagodes spp.
- Petelia medardaria
- Perixera illepidaria
- Phaiogramma discessa
- Phazaca theclata
- Pingasa spp.
- Problepsis vulgaris
- Psaliodes spp.
- Scardamia spp.
- Scopula addictaria
- Scopula caesaria
- Scopula emissaria
- Scopula minorata
- Scopula pulchellata complex
- Somatina anthophilata
- Somatina omicraria
- Synegiodes spp.
- Thalassodes spp.
- Traminda mundissima
- Zamarada spp.

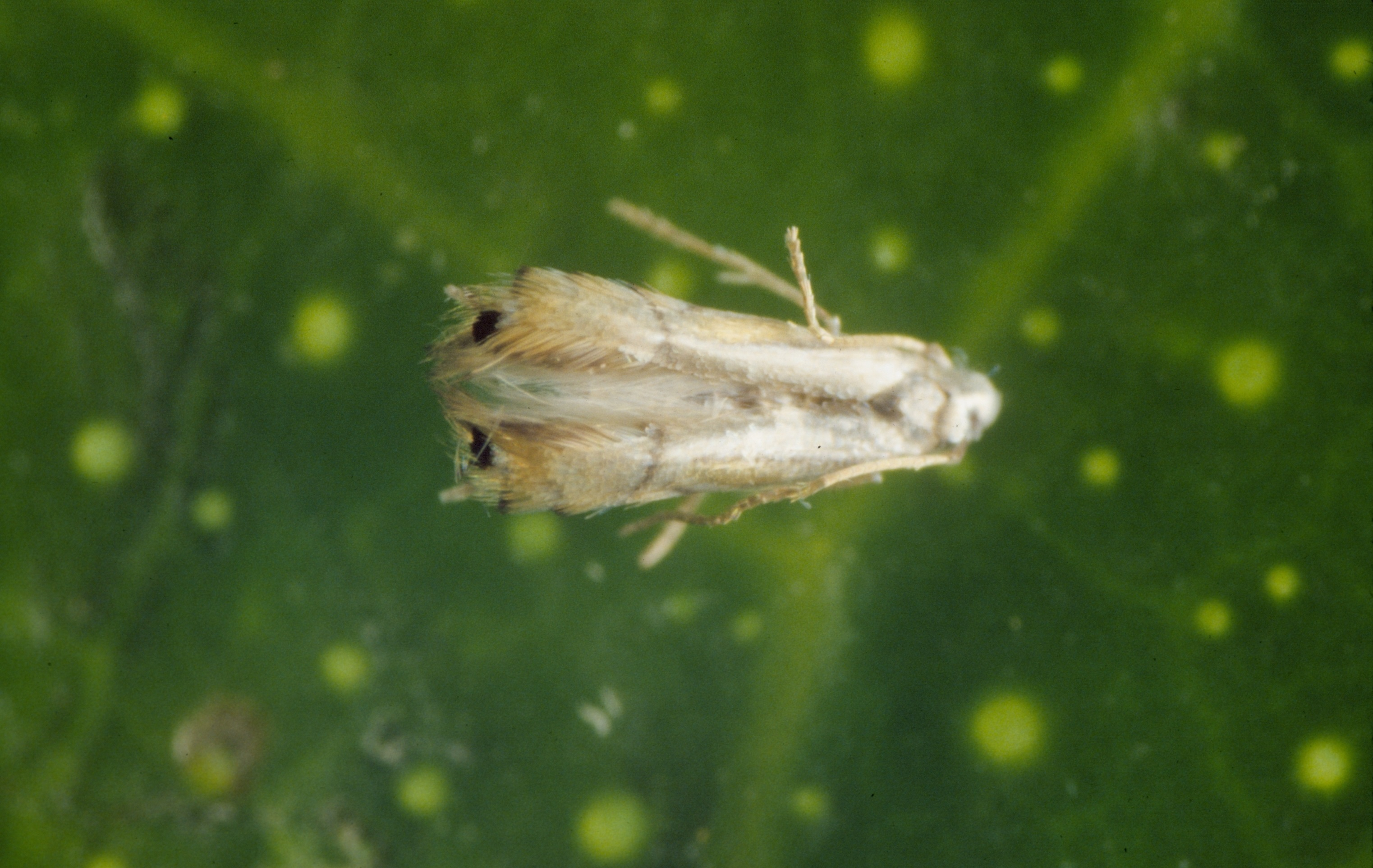
Phyllocnistis citrella

=== Gracillarioidea ===
- Acrocercops spp.
- Cameraria spp.
- Epicephala spp.
- Phyllocnistis citrella
- Stomphastis chalybacma

=== Hyblaeoidea ===
- Hyblaea puera

=== Immoidea ===
- Imma mylias

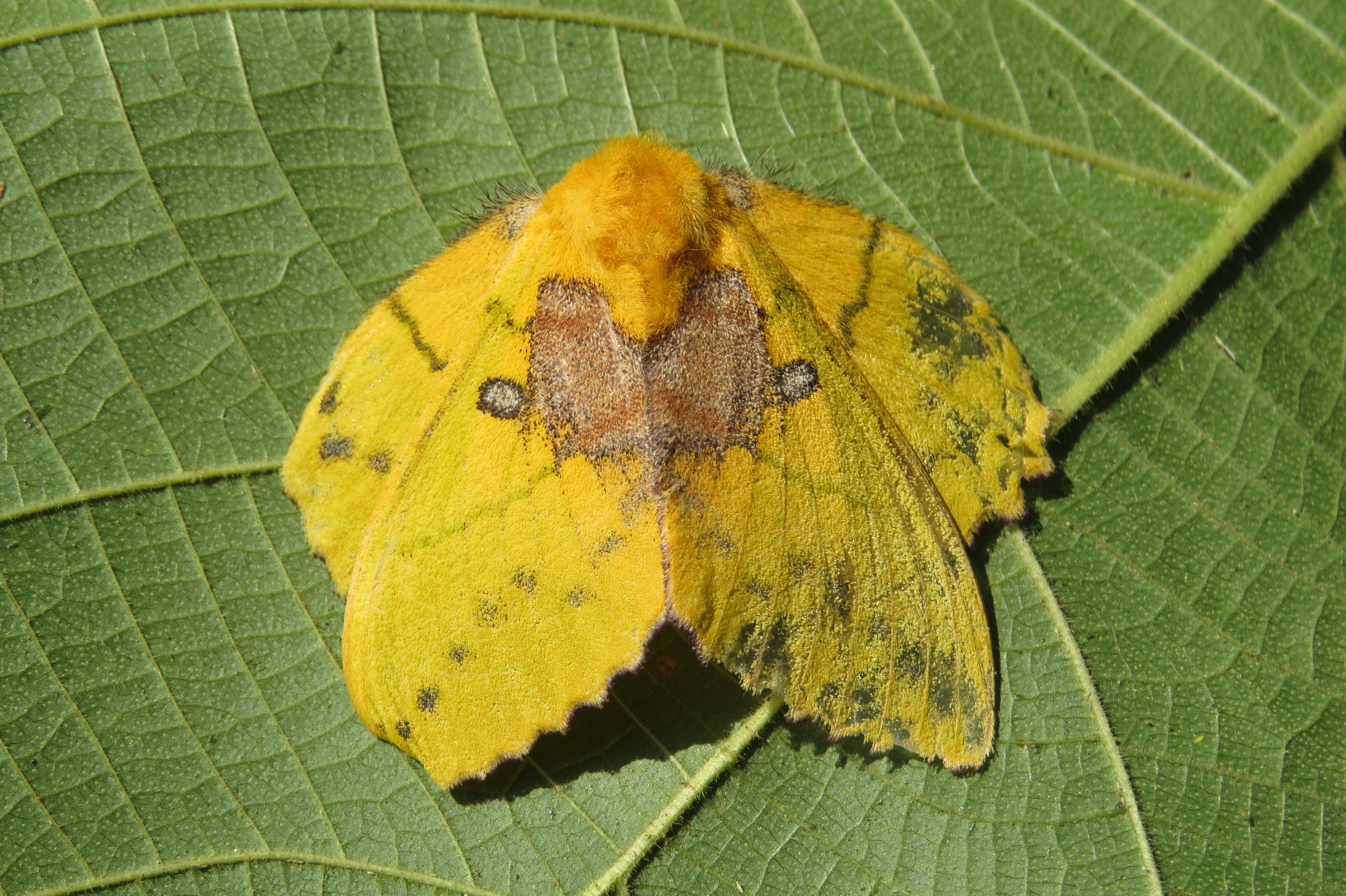
Trabala vishnou

=== Lasiocampoidea ===
- Chilena similis
- Gastropacha spp.
- Metanastria spp.
- Streblote siva
- Trabala vishnou

=== Nepticuloidea ===
- Stigmella spp.
- Pseudopostega spp.

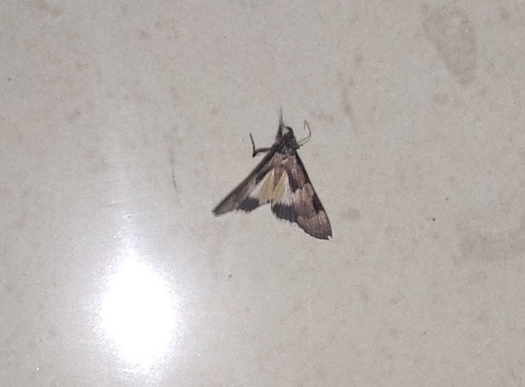
Audea stenophaea

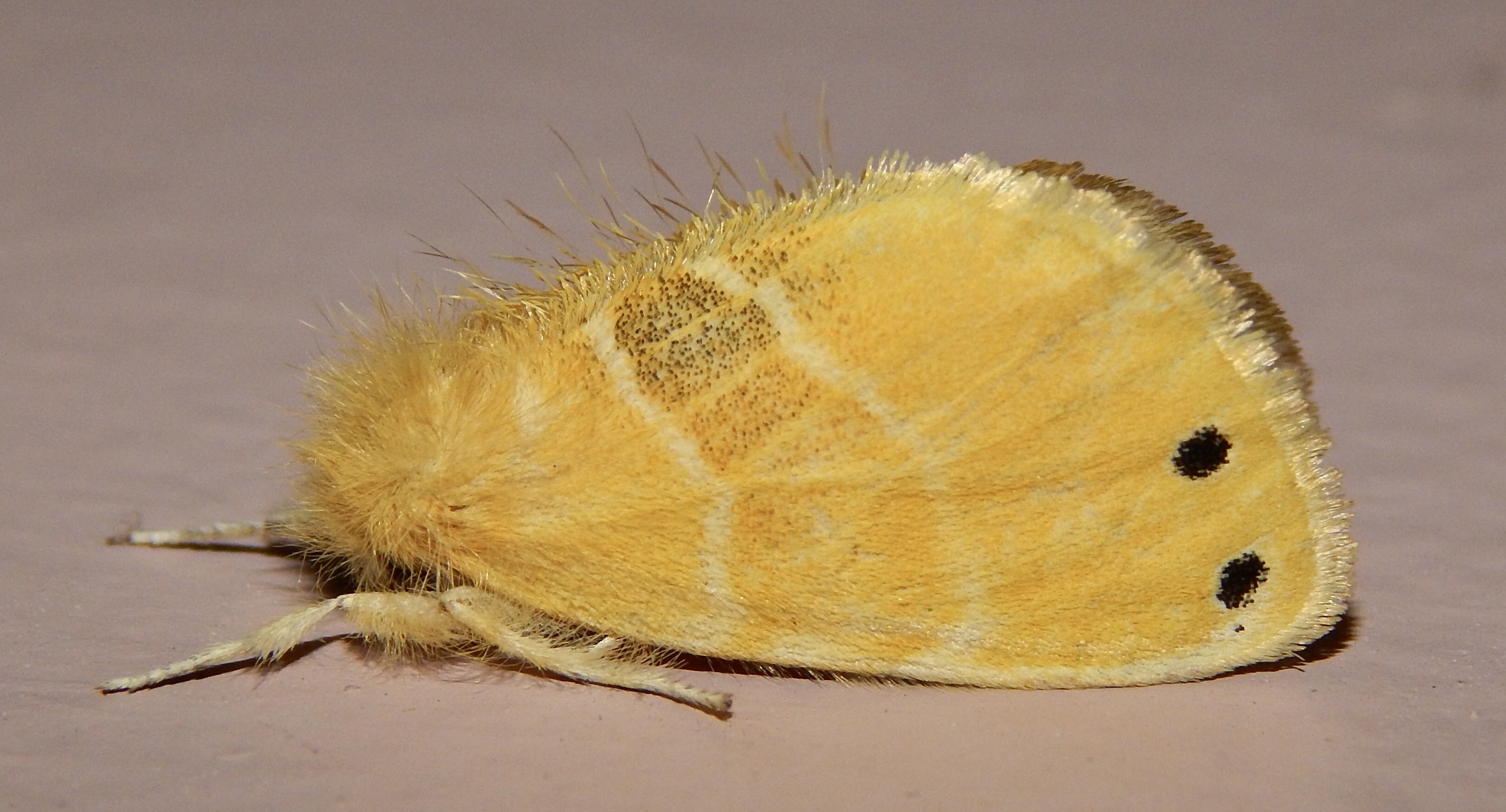
Artaxa guttata

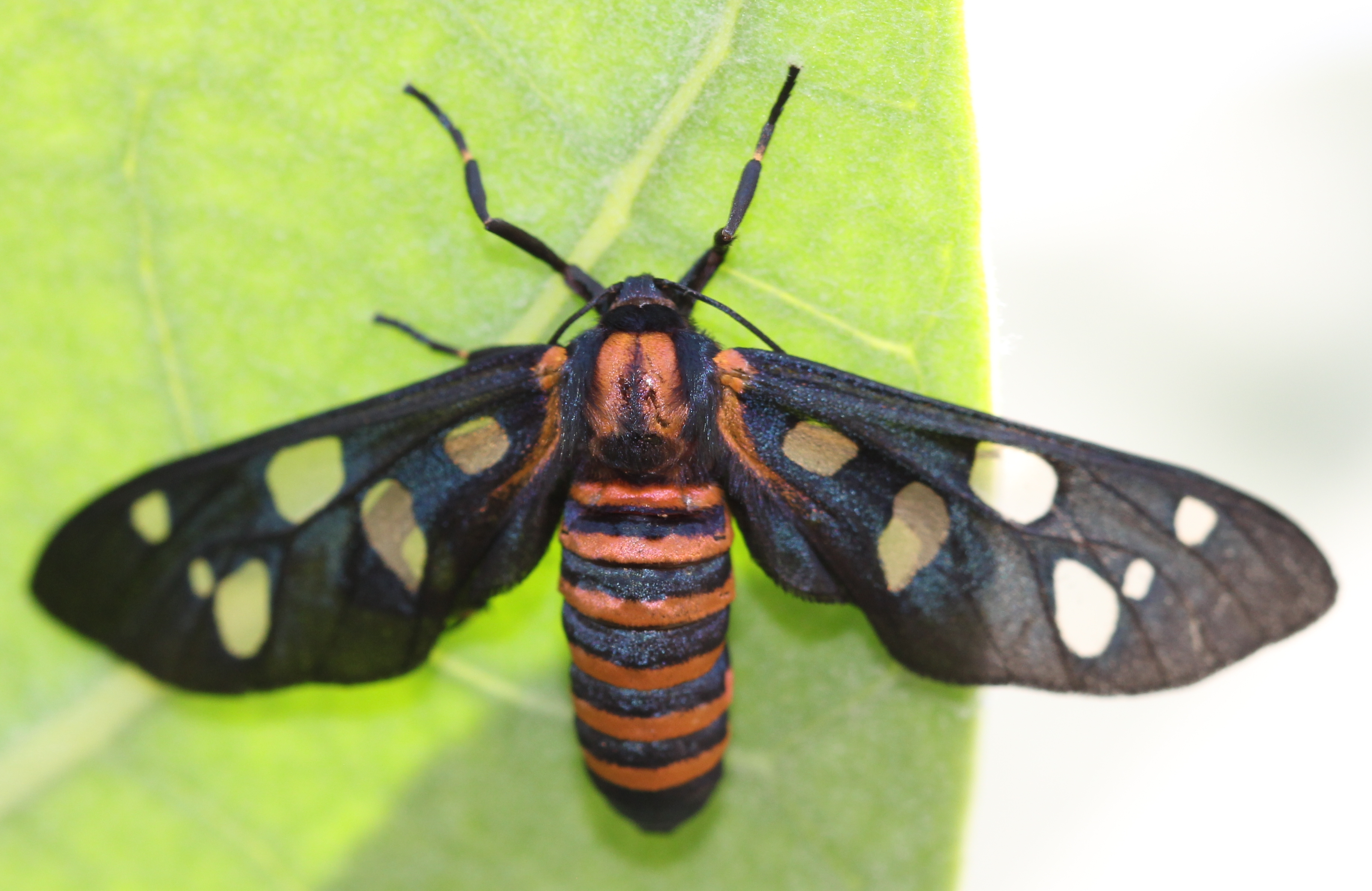
Amata passalis

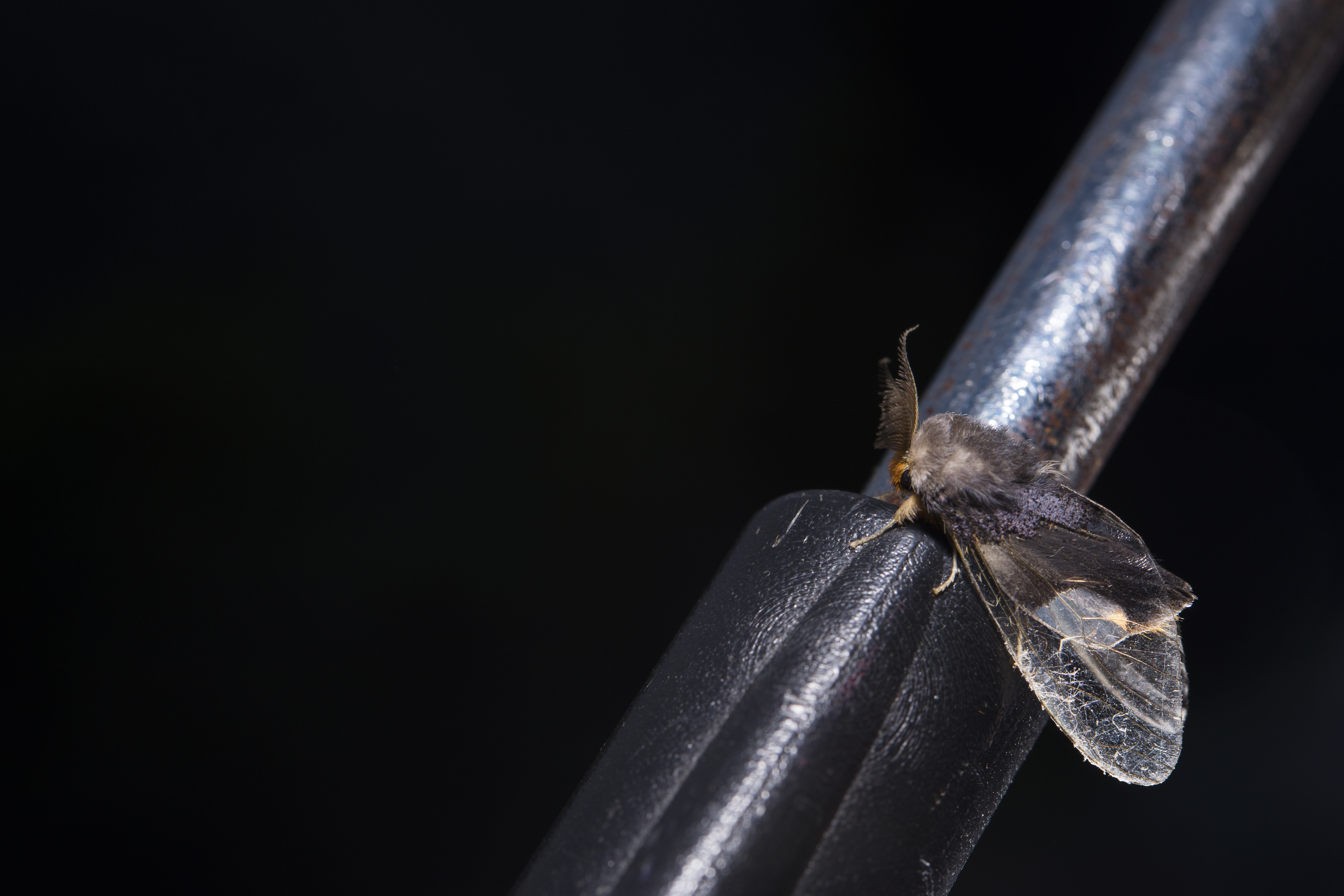
Perina nuda

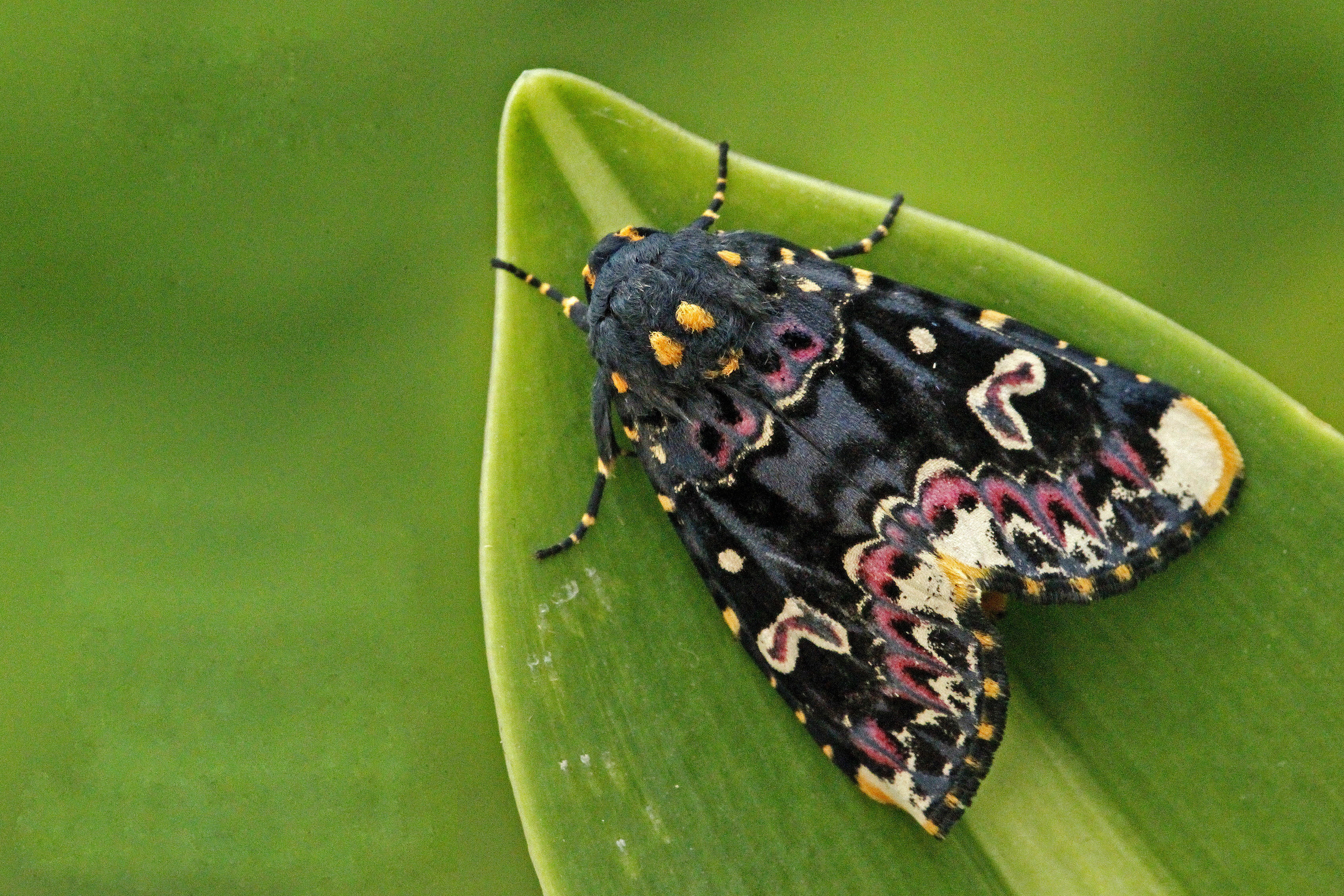
Polytela gloriosae

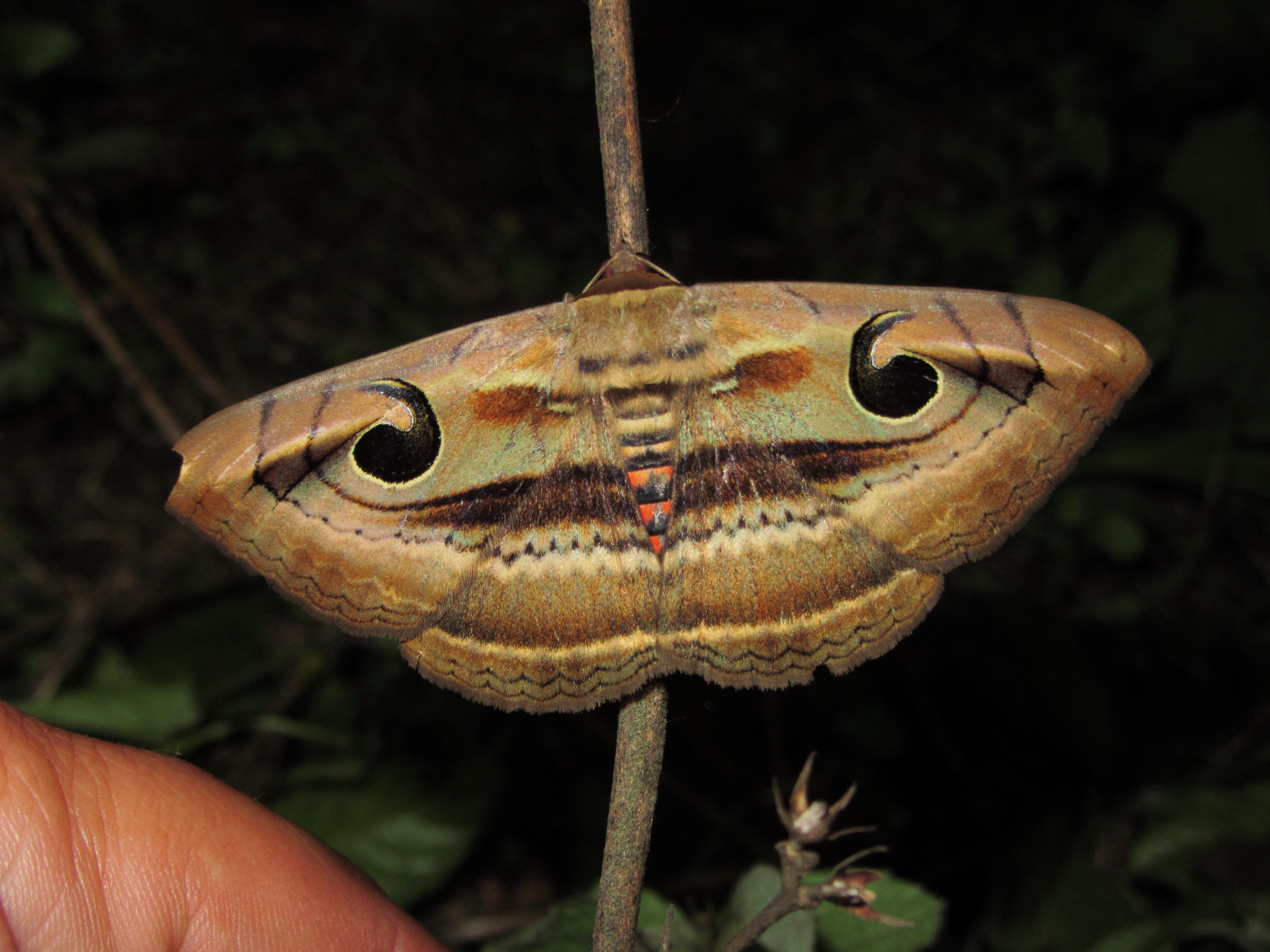
Spirama retorta

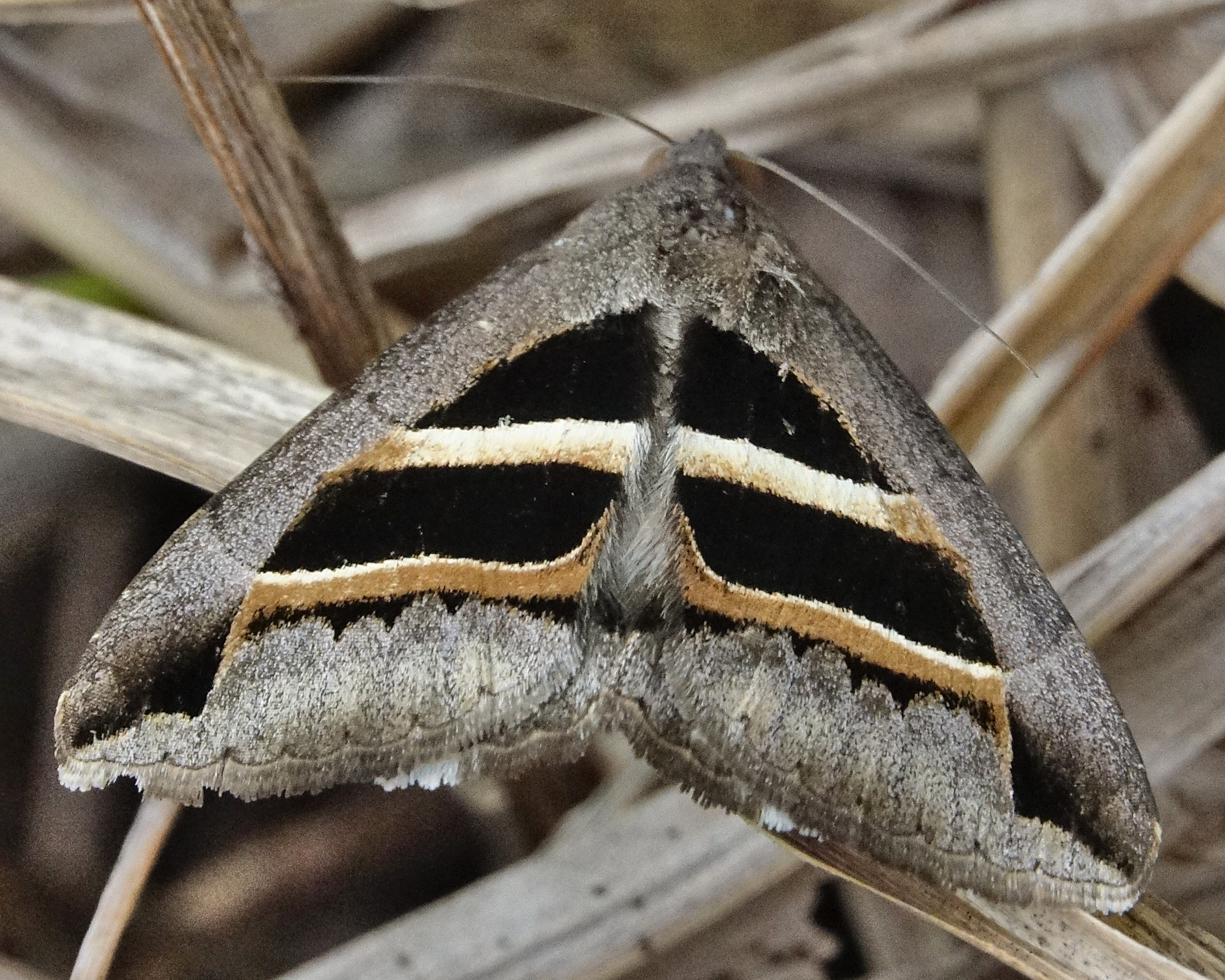
Grammodes geometrica

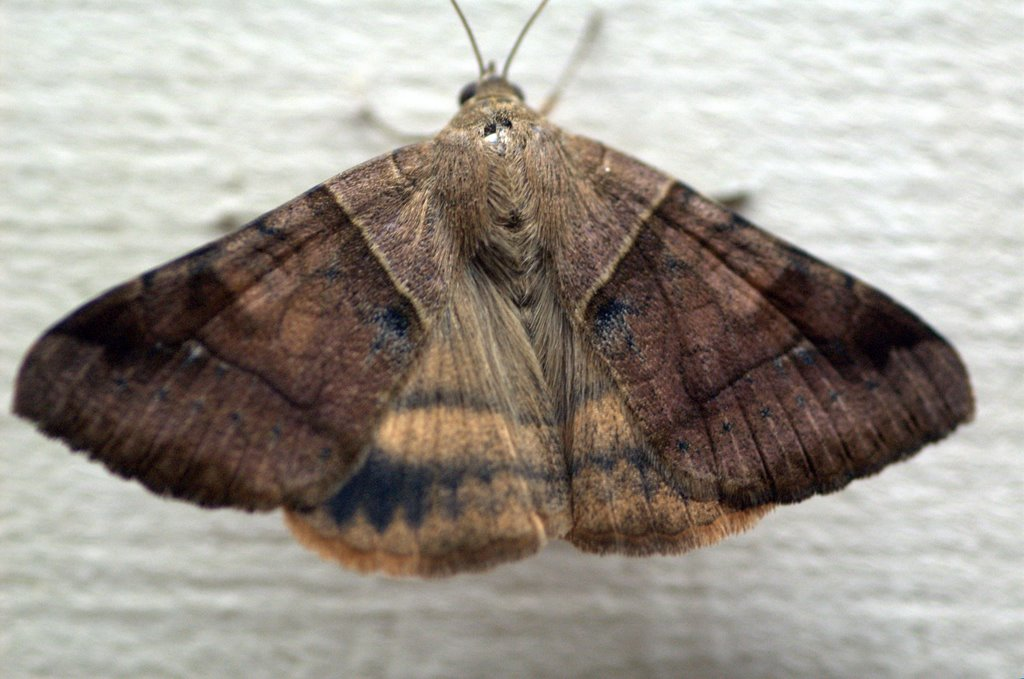
Mocis undata

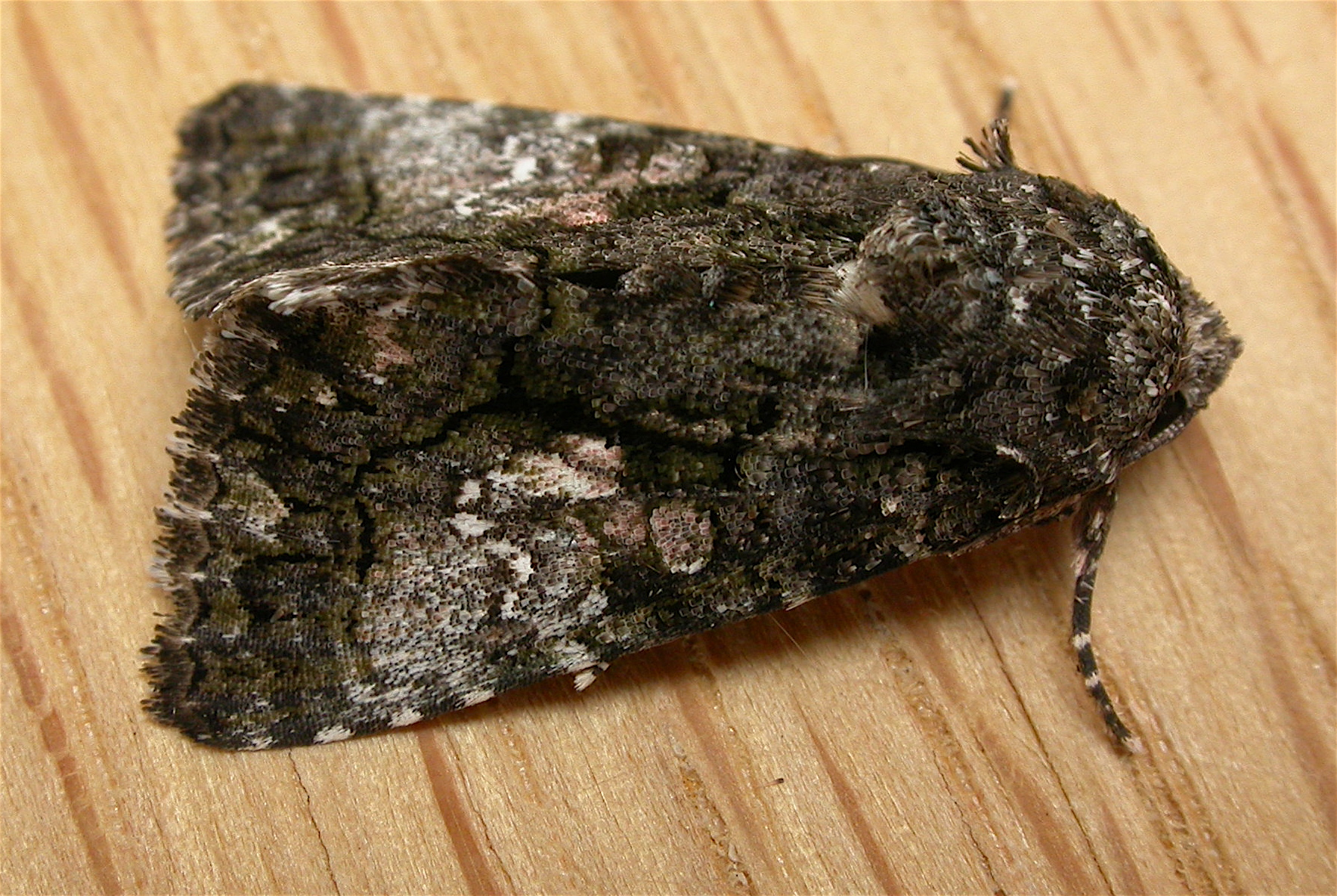
Aedia leucomelas

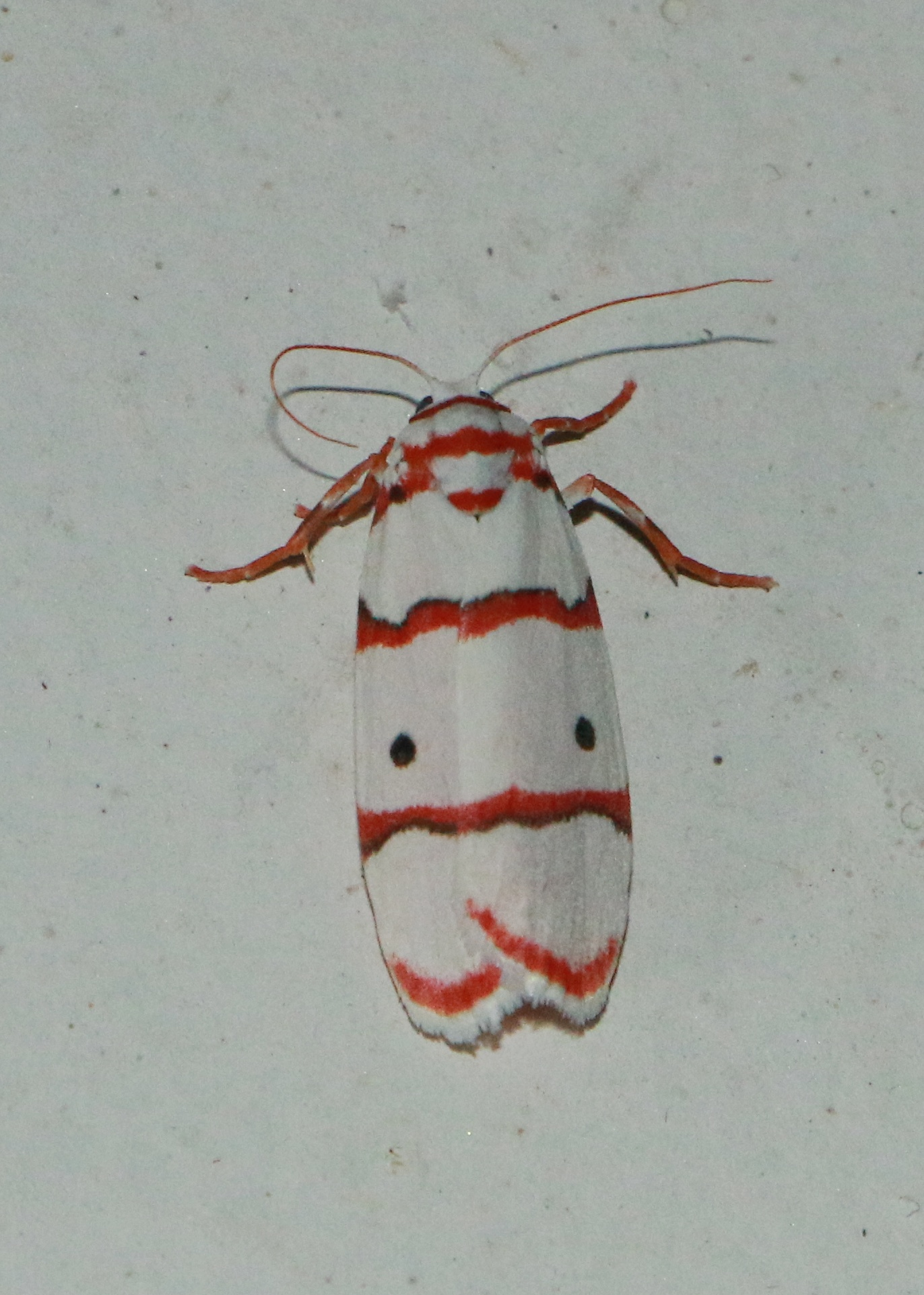
Cyana peregrina

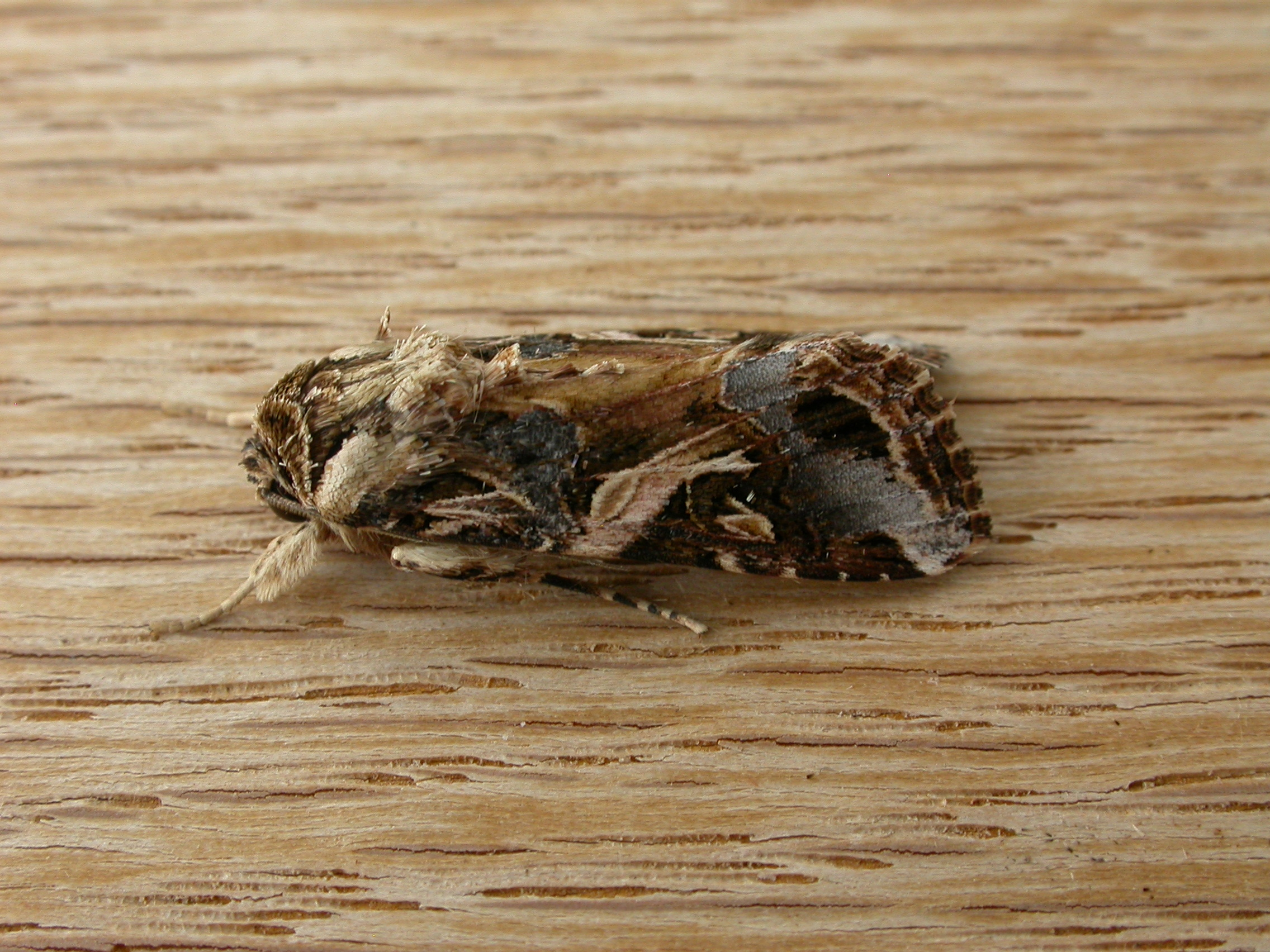
Spodoptera litura

=== Noctuoidea ===
- Acantholipes circumdata
- Acantholipes trajecta
- Achaea janata
- Achaea serva
- Acontia marmoralis
- Adisura marginalis
- Aedia leucomelas
- Afrasura spp.
- Aegocera venulia
- Aiteta spp.
- Aloa lactinea
- Amata cyssea
- Amata passalis
- Amerila astreus
- Amyna spp.
- Anachrostis spp.
- Anomis spp.
- Antheua servula
- Anticarsia irrorata
- Anuga spp.
- Araeopteron spp.
- Argina astrea
- Artaxa guttata
- Artena dotata
- Asota caricae
- Asota ficus
- Asota producta
- Ataboruza divisa
- Ataboruza stragulata
- Athetis bremusa
- Attatha ino
- Audea stenophaea
- Avatha bubo
- Axylia spp.
- Bamra mundata
- Bastilla crameri
- Bastilla properata
- Bastilla simillima
- Blasticorhinus rivulosa
- Blenina spp.
- Brevipecten captata
- Brevipecten consanguis
- Britha biguttata
- Brunia antica
- Callopistria maillardi
- Callyna spp.
- Carea angulata
- Catephia linteola
- Cerynea punctilinealis
- Ceryx diptera
- Condica illecta
- Chalciope mygdon
- Chasmina candida
- Chlumetia transversa
- Chrysodeixis eriosoma
- Corgatha dictaria
- Creatonotos gangis complex
- Cretonia spp.
- Cryphia spp.
- Culasta indecisa
- Cyana peregrina
- Cyana puella
- Dichromia sagitta
- Dierna patibulum
- Dysgonia stuposa
- Dysgonia torrida
- Earias insulana
- Earias vittella
- Egnasia ephyrodalis
- Eligma narcissus
- Elusa spp.
- Enispa rosellus
- Entomogramma fautrix
- Entomogramma mediocris
- Episparis liturata
- Episteme adulatrix
- Ercheia spp.
- Erebus hieroglyphica
- Erebus macrops
- Eressa confinis
- Ericeia inangulata
- Etanna spp.
- Eublemma accedens
- Eublemma baccalix
- Eublemma rivula
- Eublemma roseana
- Eublemma semirufa
- Eudocima homaena
- Eudocima materna
- Eudocima phalonia
- Eudocima salaminia
- Euproctis cervina
- Euproctis lunata
- Eustrotia marginata
- Evonima plagiola
- Garella spp.
- Gesonia obeditalis
- Goniocraspedon spp.
- Grammodes geometrica
- Helicoverpa armigera
- Helicoverpa assulta
- Heliothis peltigera
- Hipoepa spp.
- Homaea clathrum
- Hulodes caranea
- Hydrillodes lentalis
- Hypena lacerates
- Hypena simplicalis
- Hypocala deflorata
- Hypocala subsatura
- Hypopyra meridionalis
- Hypopyra vespertilio
- Hypospila bolinoides
- Ischyja manlia
- Kamalia kandyia
- Lacera spp.
- Leucania loreyi
- Lophoptera hemithyris
- Lygniodes spp.
- Lymantria ampla
- Lymantria detersa
- Lymantria fuliginosa
- Lymantria grandis
- Lymantria nussi
- Macrobrochis gigas
- Maliattha separata
- Maliattha signifera
- Manoba spp.
- Micraloa spp.
- Miltochrista arcuata
- Miltochrista floccosa
- Miltochrista semifascia
- Mocis frugalis
- Mocis undata
- Mythimna languida
- Naarda spp.
- Nanola basalactifera
- Nepita conferta
- Nodaria externalis
- Nola pascua
- Nola taeniata
- Notodontella tenebrosa
- Nyctemera lacticinia
- Nygmia icilia
- Oeonistis entella
- Olene mendosa
- Olepa spp.
- Ophiusa mejanesi
- Ophiusa tirhaca
- Oraesia emarginata
- Orgyia postica
- Orvasca subnotata
- Ozarba spp.
- Pandesma anysa
- Pandesma robusta
- Pandesma quenavadi
- Paracrama latimargo
- Pataeta carbo
- Penicillaria jocosatrix
- Pericyma cruegeri
- Perina nuda
- Phalera grotei
- Plecoptera spp.
- Plotheia spp.
- Plusiopalpa adrasta
- Polydesma boarmoides
- Polydesma umbricola
- Polytela gloriosae
- Psalis pennatula
- Pseudozarba spp.
- Rajendra spp.
- Rhesala moestalis
- Risoba obstructa
- Rivula inconspicua
- Schistophleps pentoveinlata
- Selepa spp.
- Serrodes campana
- Serrodes partita
- Sesamia inferens
- Siccia caffra
- Siccia guttulosana
- Siccia taprobanis
- Simplicia spp.
- Sommeria hearseyana
- Sphingomorpha chlorea
- Sphrageidus spp.
- Spirama helicina
- Spirama indenta
- Spirama retorta
- Spodoptera cilium
- Spodoptera frugiperda
- Spodoptera litura
- Spodoptera mauritia
- Spodoptera pecten
- Syntomoides imaon
- Targalla delatrix
- Thyas coronata
- Turnaca spp.
- Thysanoplusia orichalcea
- Trichoplusia ni
- Trigonodes hyppasia
- Utetheisa lotrix
- Utetheisa pulchelloides
- Westermannia spp.
- Xanthodes albago
- Zurobata vacillans

=== Pterophoroidea ===
- Exelastis pumilio
- Hellinsia spp.
- Lantanophaga pusillidactyla
- Megalorhipida leucodactylus
- Sphenarches anisodactylus

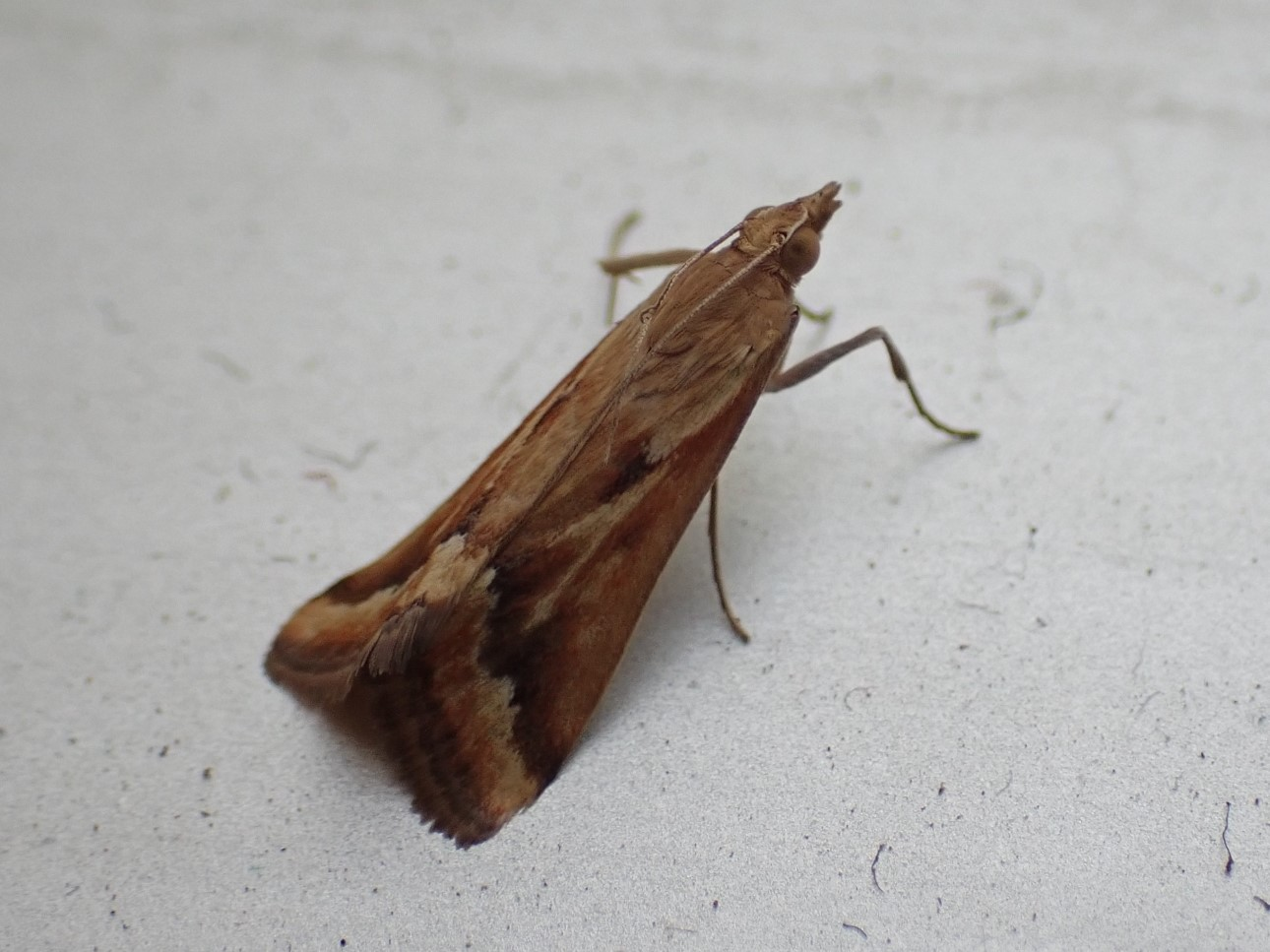
Achyra coelatalis

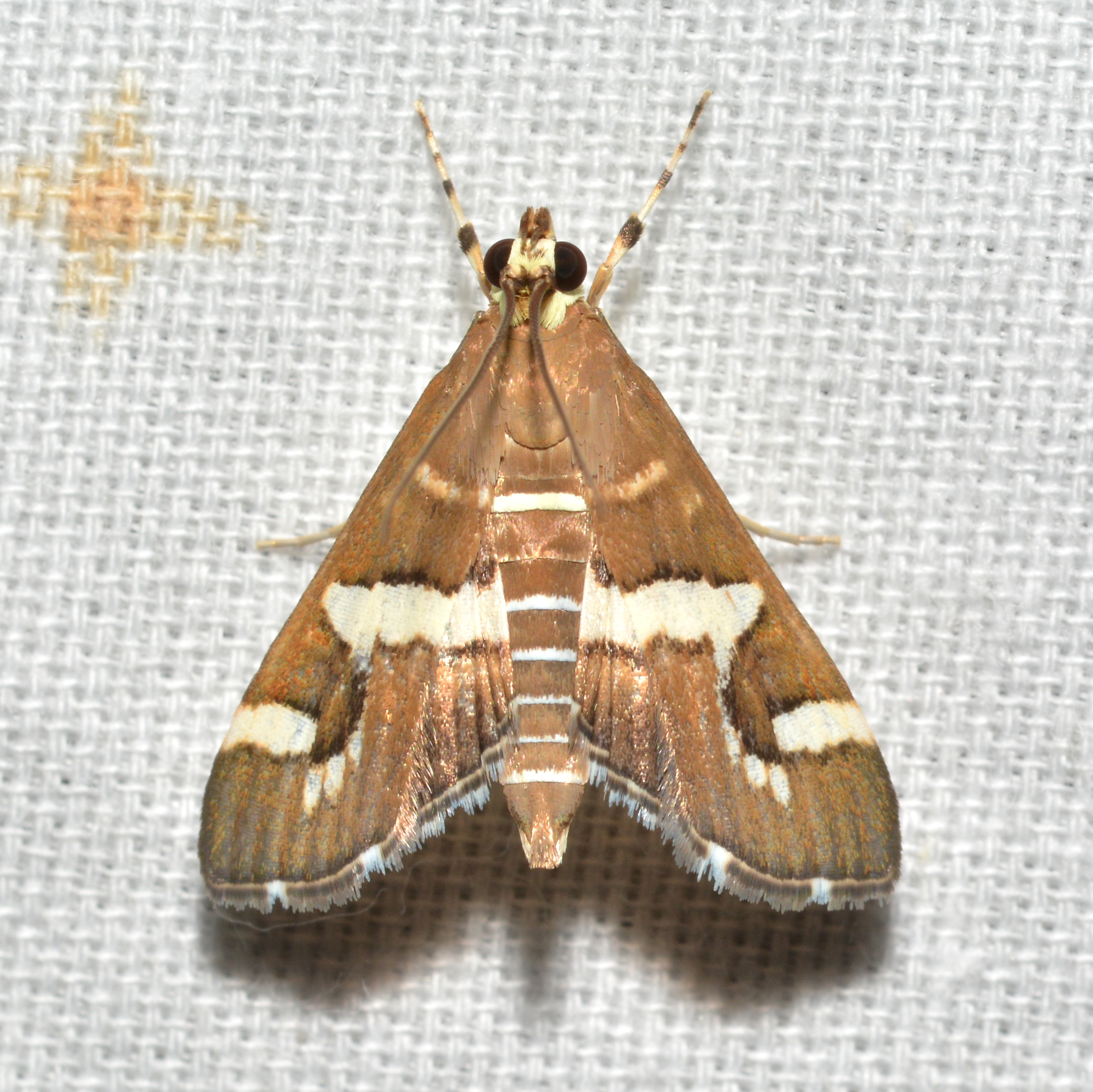
Spoladea recurvalis

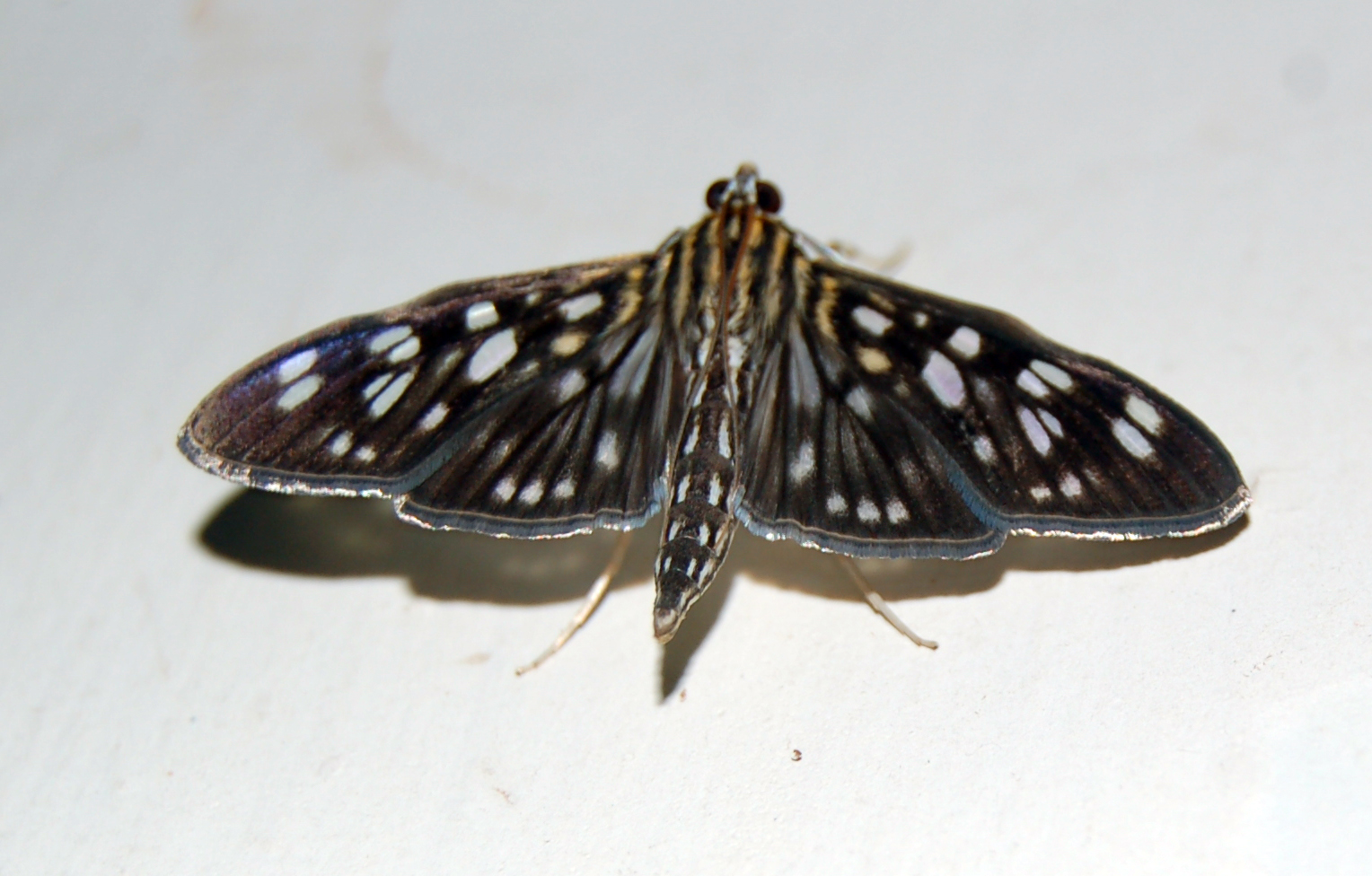
Pygospila tyres

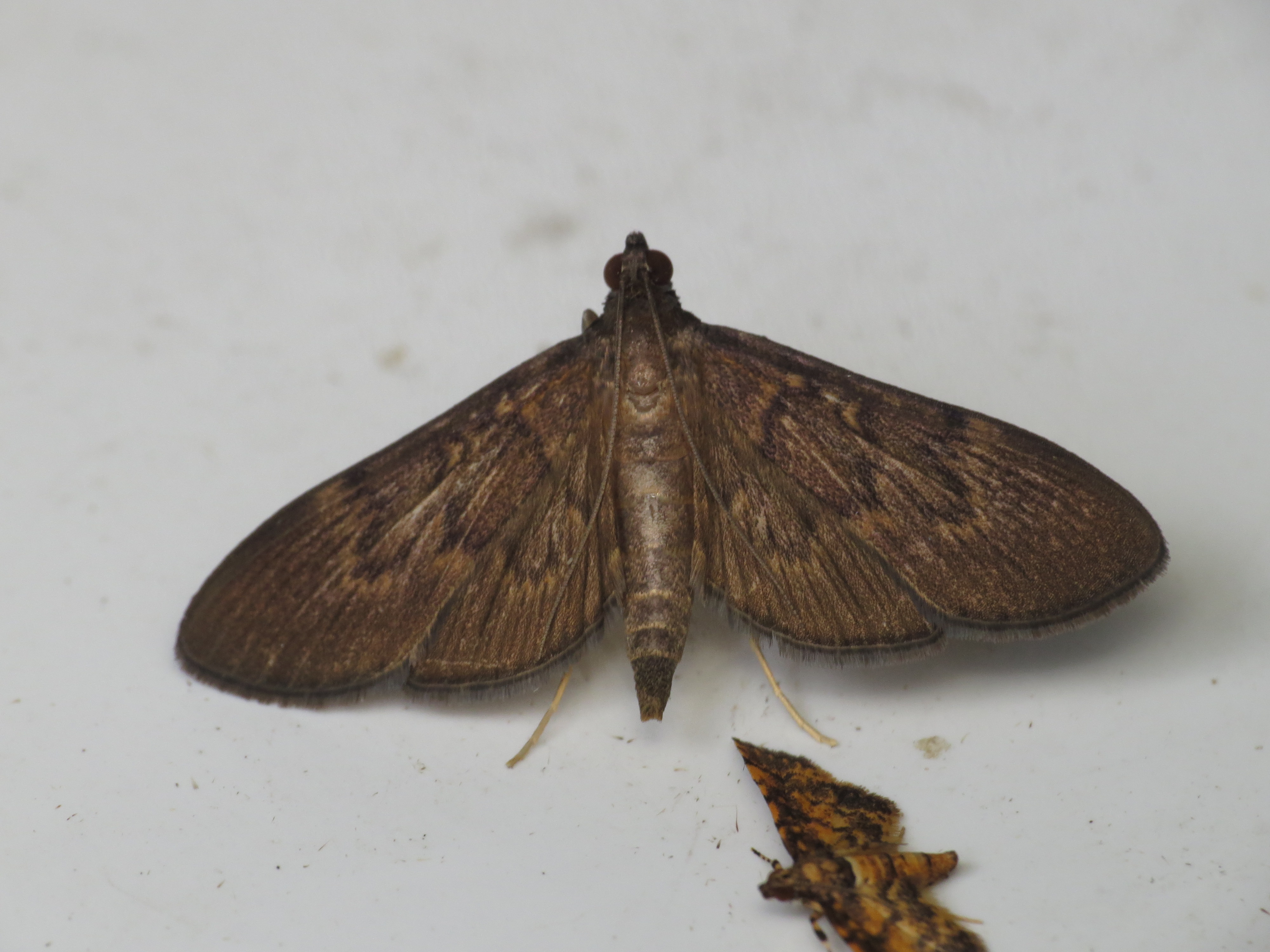
Herpetogramma licarsisalis

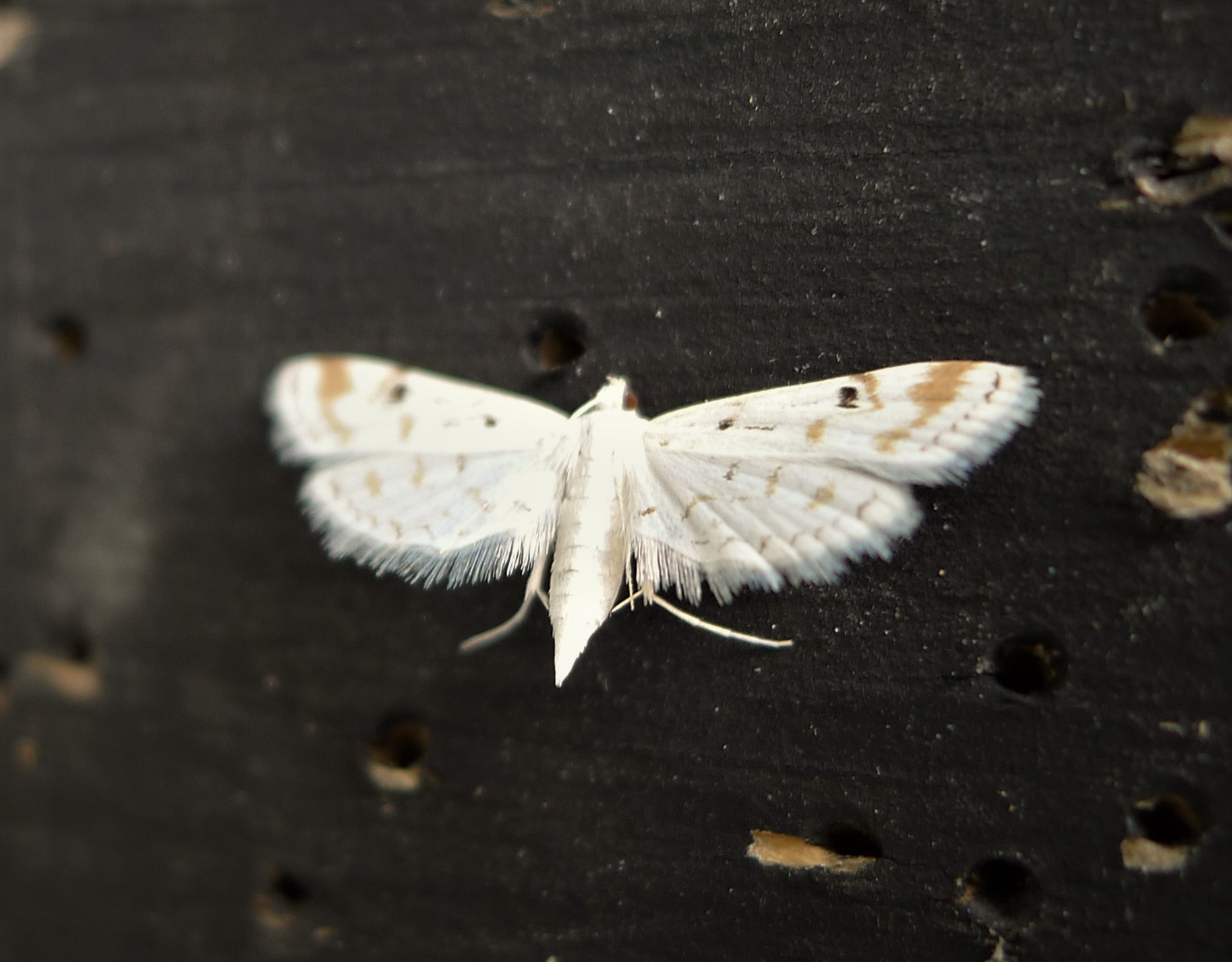
Parapoynx stagnalis

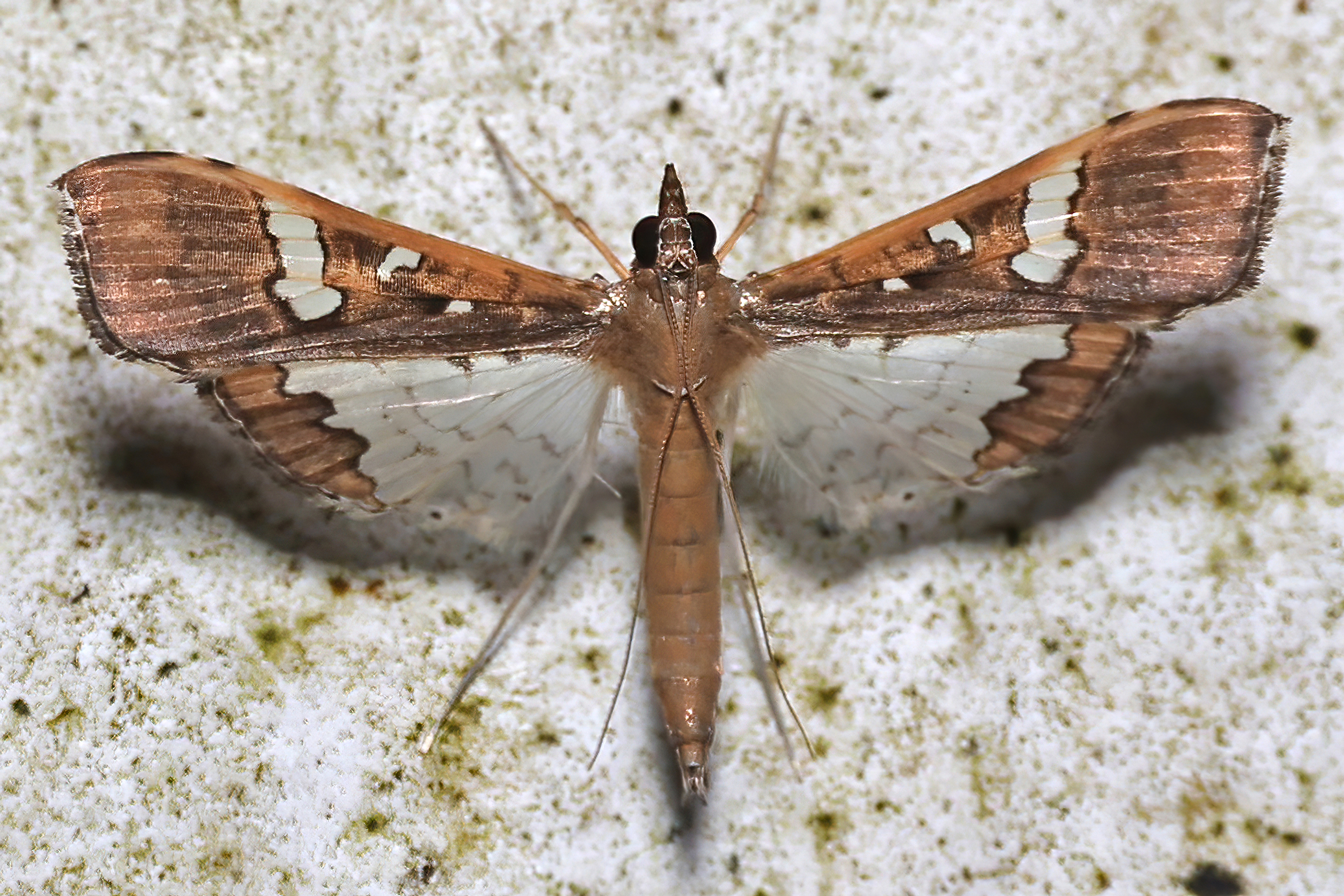
Maruca vitrata

=== Pyraloidea ===
- Achyra coelatalis
- Achyra nudalis
- Agassiziella spp.
- Agathodes ostentalis
- Agrotera basinotata
- Aphomia cephalonica
- Arippara spp.
- Autocharis fessalis
- Bradina admixtalis
- Botyodes asialis
- Chabula acamasalis
- Chabulina onychinalis
- Chilo spp.
- Cirrhochrista brizoalis
- Cnaphalocrocis medinalis
- Cnaphalocrocis rutilalis
- Crocidolomia pavonana
- Conogethes punctiferalis
- Culladia hastiferalis
- Cydalima laticostalis
- Diaphania indica
- Diasemia spp.
- Dysallacta negatalis
- Ecpyrrhorrhoe damastesalis
- Ectomyelois ceratoniae
- Elophila difflualis
- Elophila melagynalis
- Elophila scitalis
- Endocrossis flavibasalis
- Endotricha mesenterialis
- Endotricha repandalis
- Endotricha ruminalis
- Eoophyla sejunctalis
- Epicrocis spp.
- Epipaschiinae
- Epipagis peritalis
- Etiella zinckenella
- Euchromius ocellea
- Euclasta spp.
- Eurrhyparodes bracteolalis
- Glyphodes bivitralis
- Heliothela spp.
- Hellula undalis
- Herpetogramma basalis
- Herpetogramma bipunctalis
- Herpetogramma licarsisalis
- Hodebertia testalis
- Hydriris ornatalis
- Hymenia perspectalis
- Ischnurges luteomarginalis
- Isocentris filalis
- Lamoria spp.
- Leucinodes melanopalis
- Leucinodes orbonalis
- Loryma recusata
- Marasmia poeyalis
- Marasmia trapezalis
- Maruca amboinalis
- Maruca vitrata
- Metoeca foedalis
- Nausinoe geometralis
- Nausinoe perspectata
- Niphopyralis spp.
- Noorda blitealis
- Notarcha aurolinealis
- Omiodes diemenalis
- Omiodes indicata
- Ostrinia furnacalis
- Pachynoa sabelialis
- Pagyda salvalis
- Parapoynx diminutalis
- Parapoynx fluctuosalis
- Parapoynx stagnalis
- Parotis pomonalis
- Poliobotys ablactalis
- Pramadea lunalis
- Ptychopseustis spp.
- Purpurata iopasalis
- Pycnarmon cribrata
- Pycnarmon virgatalis
- Pygospila costiflexalis
- Pygospila tyres
- Pyralis fumipennis
- Pyralis manihotalis
- Pyralis pictalis
- Pyrausta phoenicealis
- Pyrausta spp. (undescribed species, close to P. signatalis)
- Rehimena phrynealis
- Sameodes cancellalis
- Scirpophaga incertulas
- Scirpophaga nivella
- Spoladea recurvalis
- Stemorrhages spp.
- Sufetula spp.
- Symmoracma minoralis
- Synclera traducalis
- Syngamia latimarginalis
- Talanga sexpunctalis
- Tatobotys biannulalis
- Trichophysetis duplifascialis
- Ulopeza idyalis
- Zitha torridalis

=== Thyridoidea ===
- Banisia fenestrifera
- Rhodoneura spp.

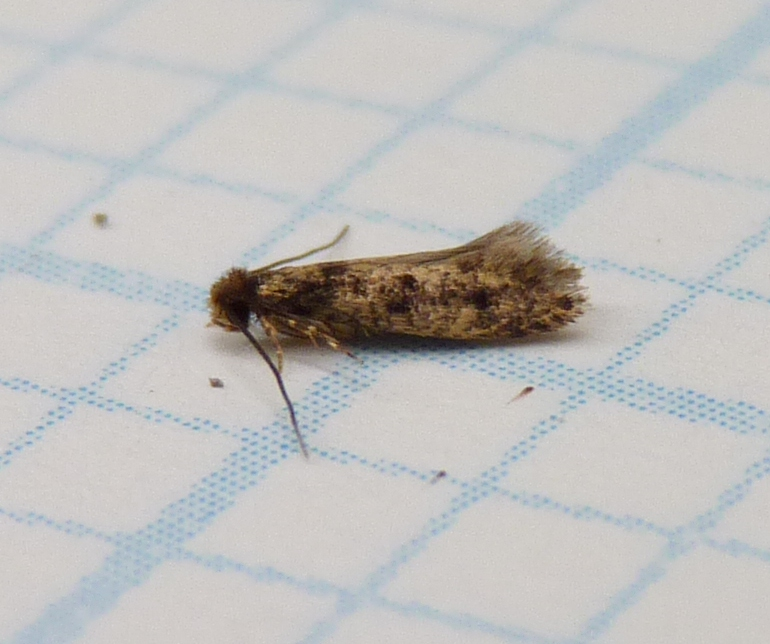
Phereoeca uterella

=== Tineoidea ===
- Eumeta variegata
- Opogona flavofasciata
- Phereoeca uterella
- Tinea pellionella
- Phaeoses spp.

=== Tortricoidea ===
- Archipini spp.
- Dudua spp.
- Lobesia spp.
- Loboschiza koenigiana

=== Yponomeutoidea ===
- Atteva spp.
- Glyphipterix argyromis
- Plutella xylostella
- Yponomeutidae spp.

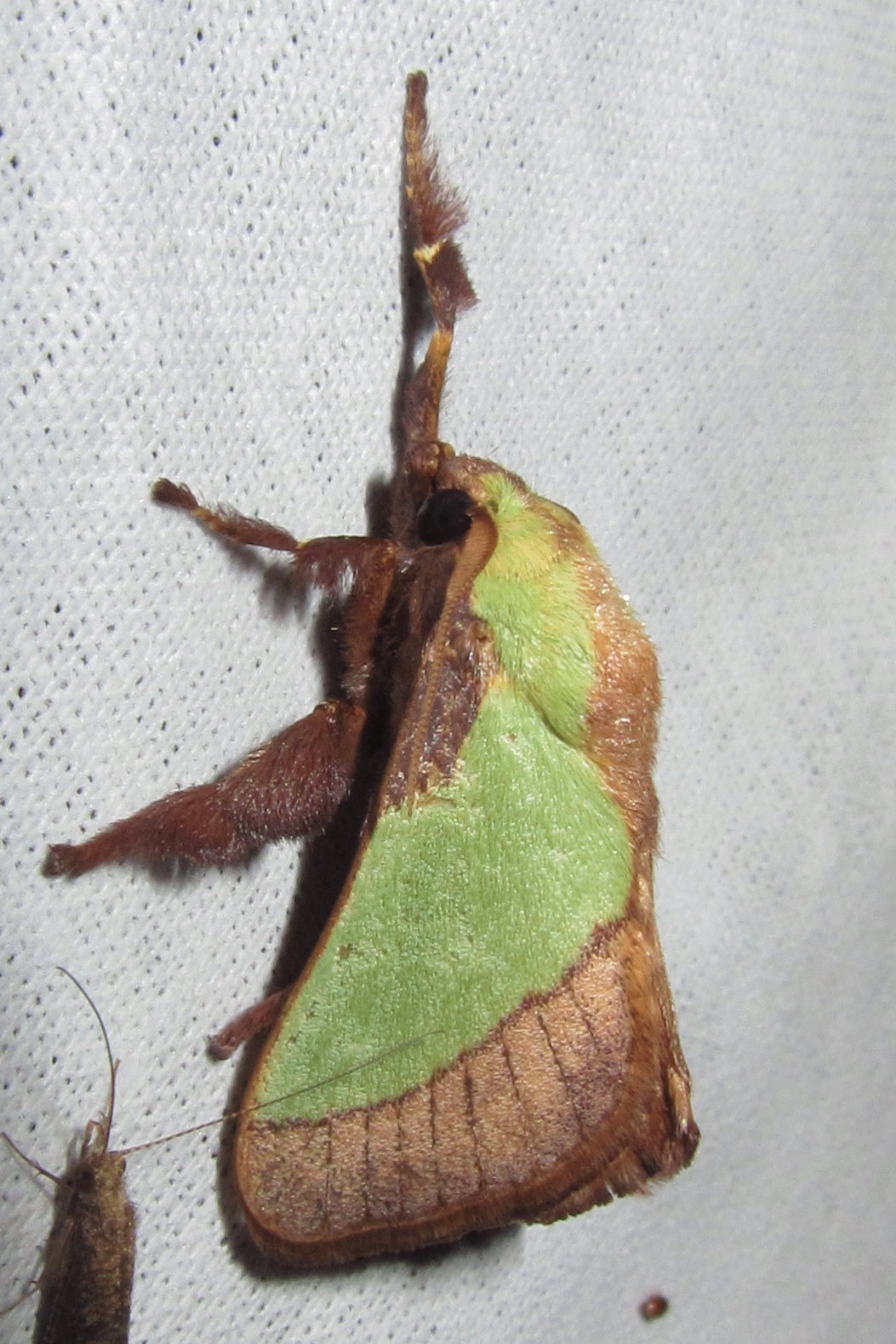
Parasa lepida

=== Zygaenoidea ===
- Altha spp.
- Anticrates spp.
- Aphendala spp.
- Avatara aperiens
- Griseothosea spp.
- Macroplectra spp.
- Narosa spp.
- Parasa lepida
- Phauda flammans
- Thyrassia subcordata
- Trypanophora semihyalina
