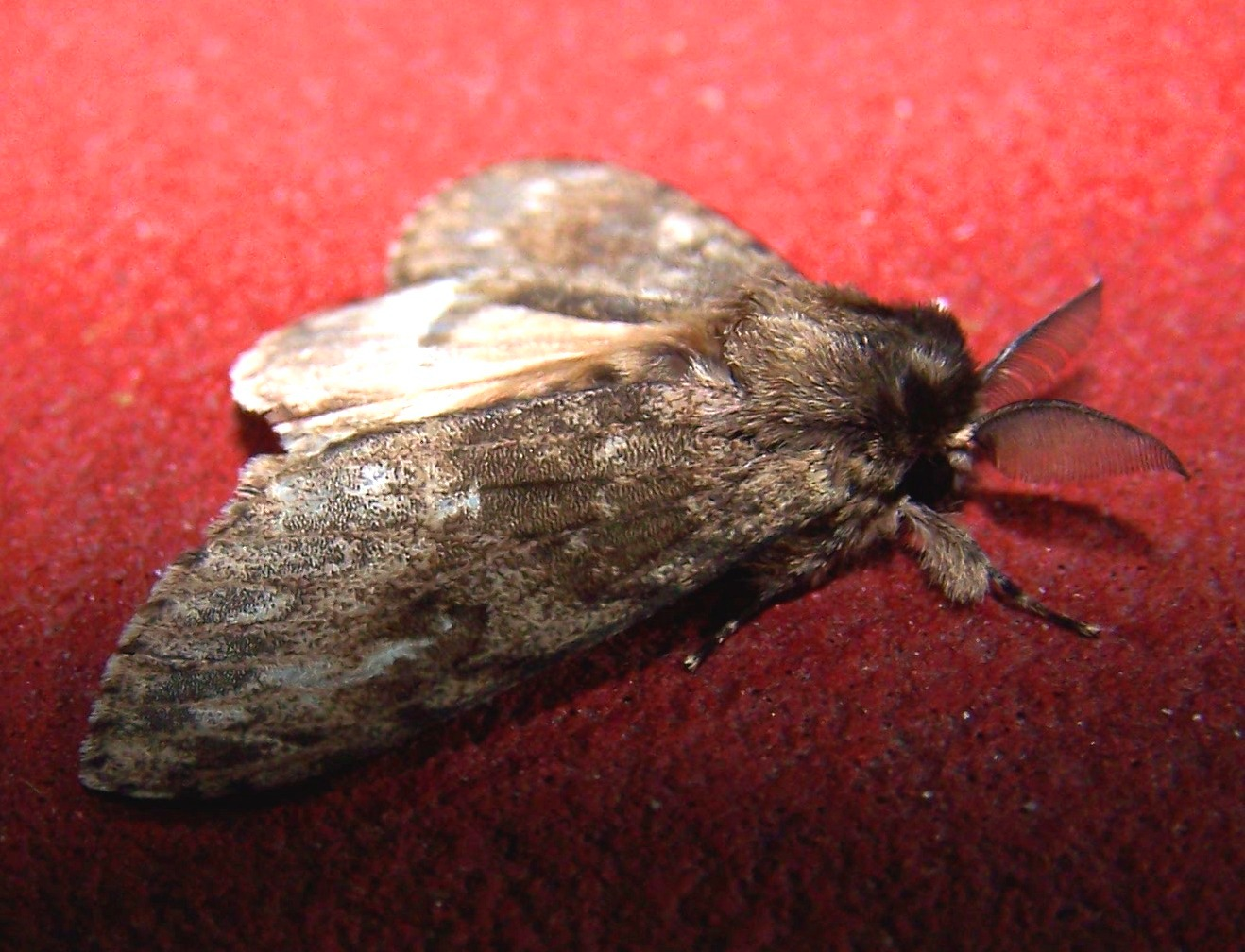

Scientific classification
- Domain: Eukaryota
- Kingdom: Animalia
- Phylum: Arthropoda
- Class: Insecta
- Order: Lepidoptera
- Superfamily: Noctuoidea
- Family: Erebidae
- Genus: Lymantria
- Species: L. serva

Binomial name
- Lymantria serva (Fabricius, 1793)

Synonyms
- Bombyx serva Fabricius, 1793; Lymantria obsoleta Walker, 1855; Lymantria bhascara Moore, 1859; Lymantria vinacea Moore, 1879; Lymantria obsoleta iris Strand, 1910

= Lymantria serva =

Ficus tussock moth

Species of moth

Lymantria serva, the ficus tussock moth or serva tussock moth, is a moth in the family Erebidae. It was described by Johan Christian Fabricius in 1793 and is found in Nepal, Sri Lanka, Assam in India and Yunnan in China. It is possibly also found in Taiwan and Hongkong, but these records might be Lymantria iris.

== Description ==
The length of the forewings is 17–19 mm for males and 26–36 mm for females. In the male, the body color is brownish. The abdomen slightly tinged with crimson. Forewing irrorated (sprinkled) with dark scales. There are indistinct double lunulate antemedial, medial, and postmedial lines present. The black lunule at the end of the cell, but no spot in the cell. Hindwings are pale brownish fuscous. In female, abdomen crimson, with a dark line on vertex and series of lateral black spots, the extremity is brownish. Hindwings with crimson suffused inner area.

== Ecology ==
The larvae feed on Ficus species and Shorea robusta. The larvae have an exceptionally long development period with 10 to 12 instars. The sex pheromone 2-Methyl-(Z)-7-octadecene is known to be emitted by L. serva and allopatric with Lymantria lucescens.
