= Morasa =

Morasa may refer to:

- Morasa State, a princely state of India merged with Idar State in 1821
- Morasa, a synonym for Lymantria, a genus of moths
