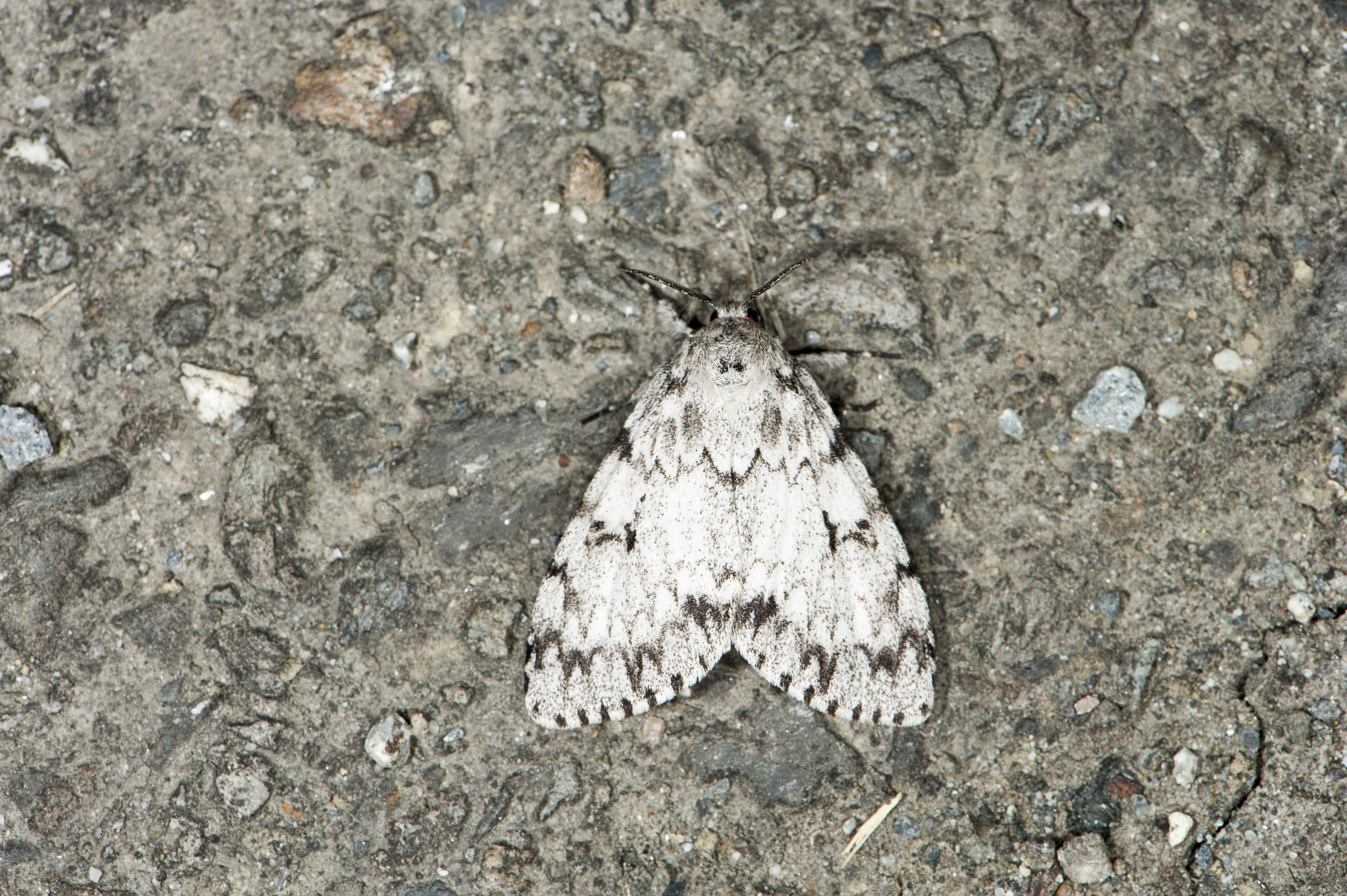

Scientific classification
- Domain: Eukaryota
- Kingdom: Animalia
- Phylum: Arthropoda
- Class: Insecta
- Order: Lepidoptera
- Superfamily: Noctuoidea
- Family: Erebidae
- Genus: Lymantria
- Species: L. grisea

Binomial name
- Lymantria grisea Moore, 1879

Synonyms
- Lymantria servula Collenette, 1936; Lymantria kosemponis Strand, 1914; Lymantria roseola Matsumura

= Lymantria grisea =

Species of moth

Lymantria grisea is a species of moth of the family Erebidae.

== Distribution ==
It is found in Nepal, northern India and Thailand, Myanmar, China and Taiwan.

The length of the forewings of this species is 21–25 mm for the females and 17–19 mm for the males.
