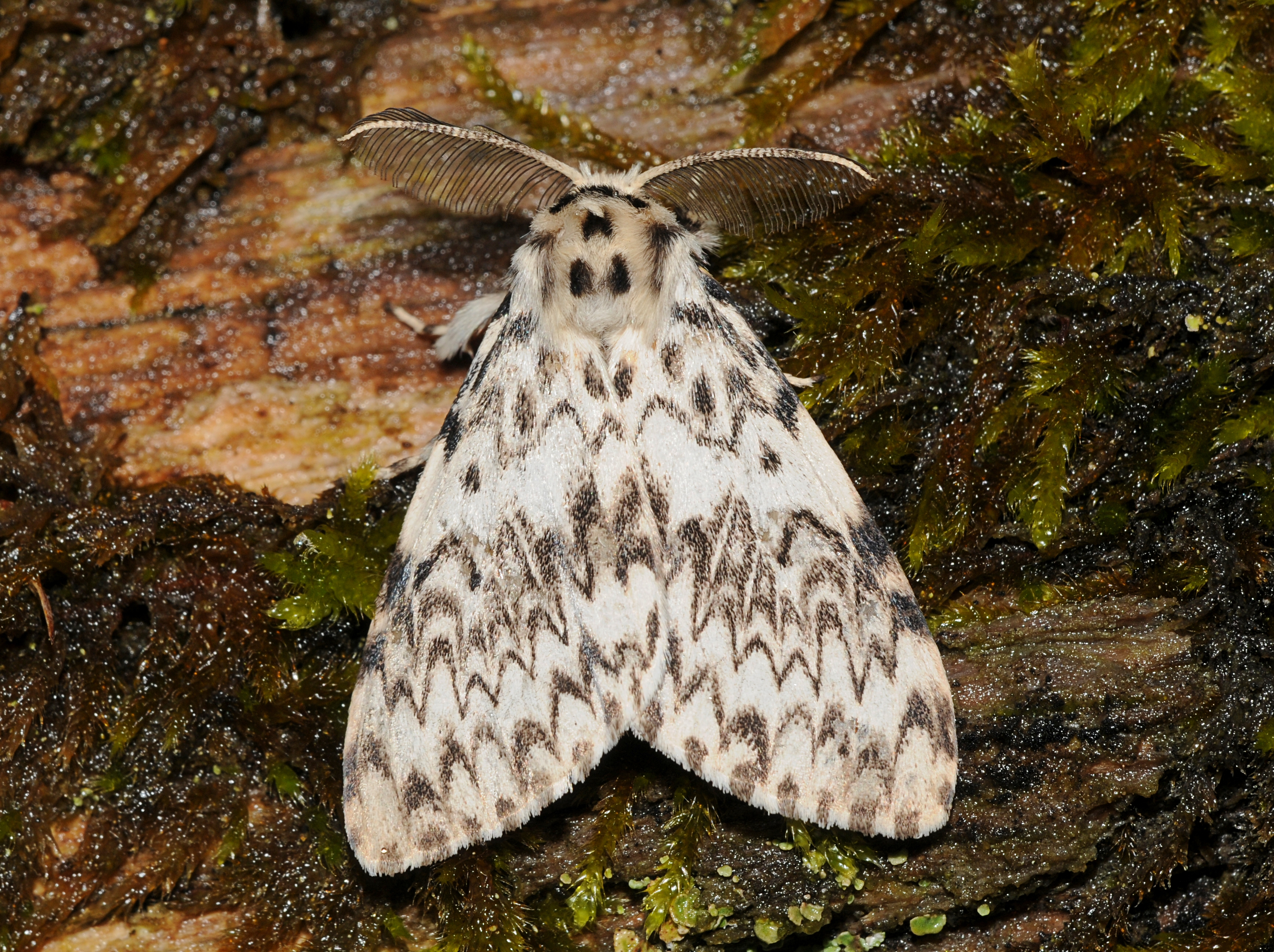
- Male (black arches)
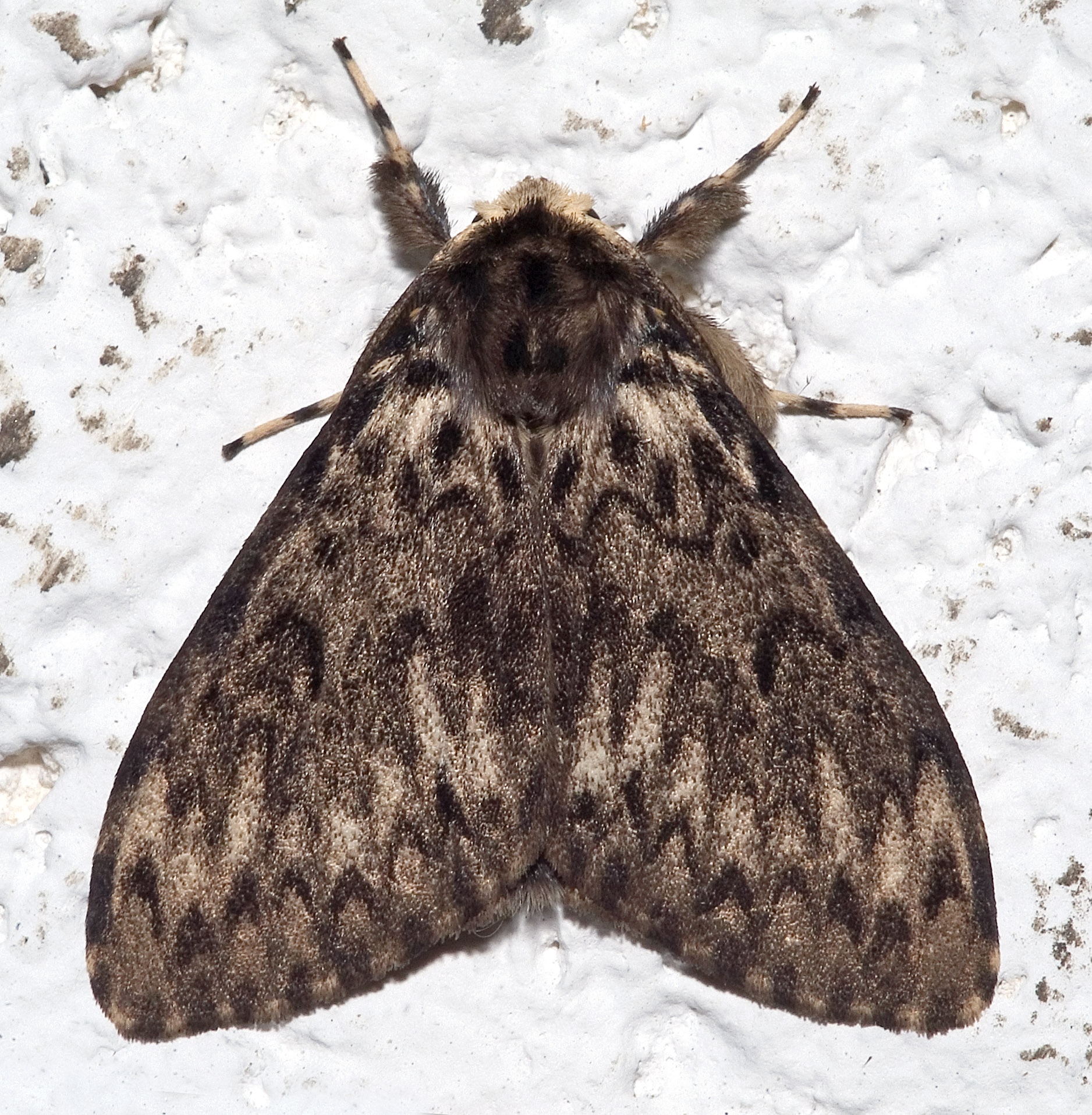
- Female (dark variant)

Scientific classification
- Kingdom: Animalia
- Phylum: Arthropoda
- Class: Insecta
- Order: Lepidoptera
- Superfamily: Noctuoidea
- Family: Erebidae
- Genus: Lymantria
- Species: L. monacha

Binomial name
- Lymantria monacha (Linnaeus, 1758)

Synonyms
- Phalaena monacha Linnaeus, 1758; Liparis monacha (Linnaeus, 1758); Ocneria monacha (Linnaeus, 1758); Porthetria monacha (Linnaeus, 1758); Psilura monacha (Linnaeus, 1758)

= Black arches =

Species of moth

The black arches or nun moth (Lymantria monacha) is a small Palaearctic moth. It is considered a forest pest.

== Description ==
The moths of Lymantria monacha have a wingspan of 40 to 50 mm. They have white forewings with black connected wavy arches which gives the moth its name. The light brown hindwings have white fringes having black spots. They also have a characteristic biscuit-coloured abdomen with a black band. Females are larger and have elongated wings.

The eggs are oval, light brown or light red. Larvae are whitish grey to blackish, with grey hairs, red and blue warts, and a dark longitudinal dorsal line which is interrupted or broadened into spots in places. Pupa is golden glossy red-brown or dark brown, with reddish hairs dorsally and rather long anal point.

== Technical description and variation ==
White forewing with black basal spots and four sharply angulate black transverse lines, the second of which is the broadest; hindwing greyish white and grey. Abdomen light rosepink. The species varies strongly and has received the following aberrational names, nigra Fr.: The two central bands are confluent at the costal and posterior margins, forming black spots, or the whole median area is dark, the red of the abdomen usually weaker, eremita G.: Forewing and abdomen smoke-brown or blackish grey, the former with black markings, atra Linst.: Forewing uniformly black, without markings, hindwing greyish brown, abdomen black, lutea Anel is a light form in which the central bands are interrupted; the red colour of the abdomen is equally deep almost to the thorax, flavoabdominalis Schultz has the abdomen yellow instead of red; subfusca Schultz female is distinguished by everything which is black in true monacha being yellowish brown, and the abdomen being also yellowish brown instead of red; in obsoleta Schultz the dark transverse bands in the median area of the forewing are absent, while they remain in the basal and outer-marginal areas. All these names were given to European specimens.

== Range ==
This moth can be found in most of Europe, including Great Britain, and in temperate regions of the Palearctic East to Japan and India.

== Life cycle ==
The larvae hibernate when young, remain together in batches and are fullgrown in June.

=== Food plants and pest significance ===
The larvae feed preferentially on spruce (Picea abies) and pine (Pinus sylvestris). They also feed on silver fir (Abies alba), European larch (Larix decidua), aspen (Populus tremula), hornbeam (Carpinus betulus), European beech (Fagus sylvatica), pedunculate oak (Quercus robur), apple (Malus domestica), sycamore (Acer pseudoplatanus), bilberry (Vaccinium myrtillus) and bogberry (Vaccinium uliginosum). In spring the larvae consume the first buds, then later the needles. A single caterpillar eats about 200 pine, or 1000 spruce needles and twice as many are damaged by biting off. Spruces die at 70 percent needle loss and pine at 90 percent. There is also a danger increased of secondary infections by longhorn beetles, bark beetles, fungi or other pathogens. Therefore, outbreaks can cause major damage in forestry.

== Gallery ==
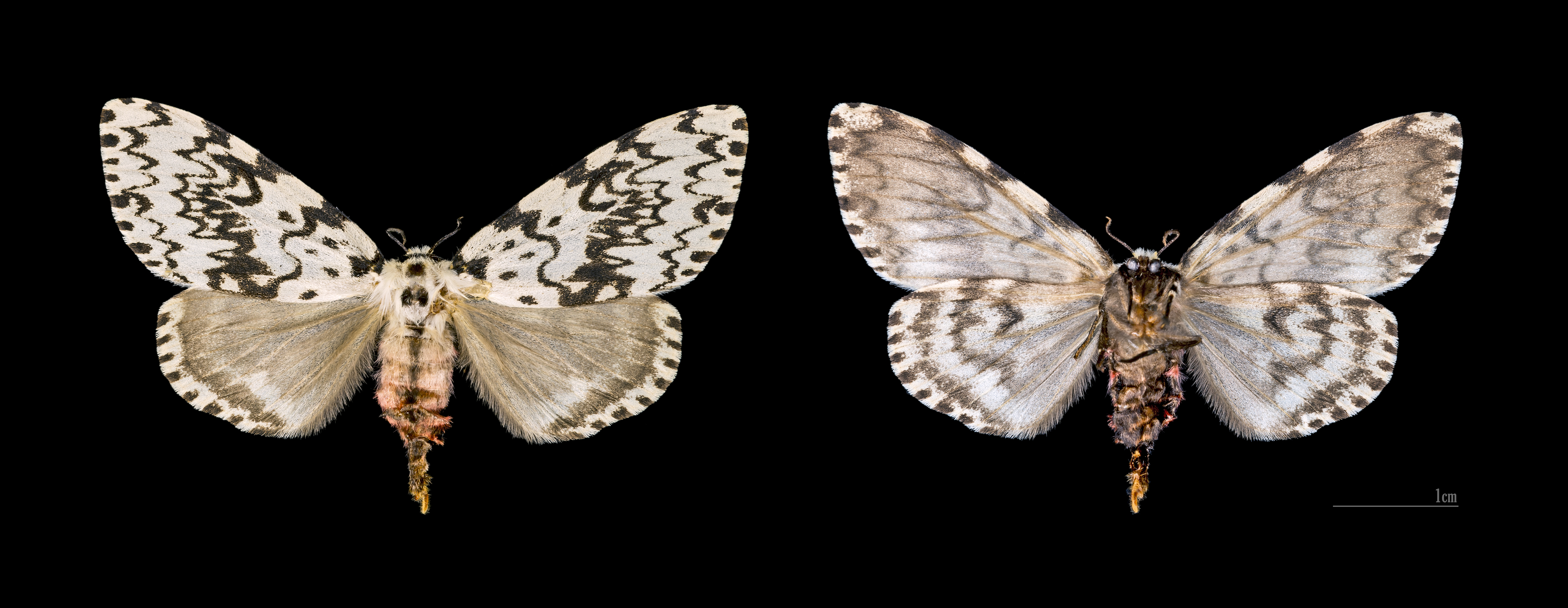
♀

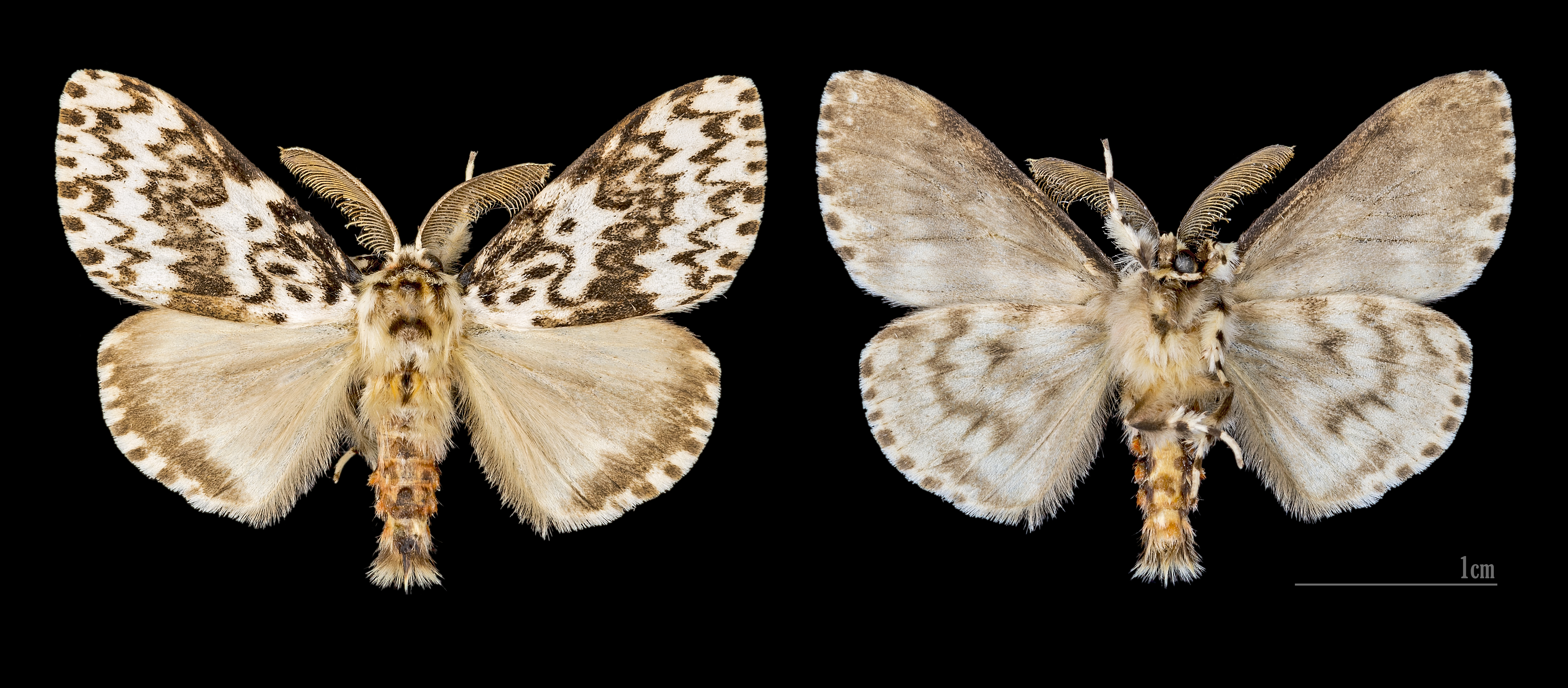
♂
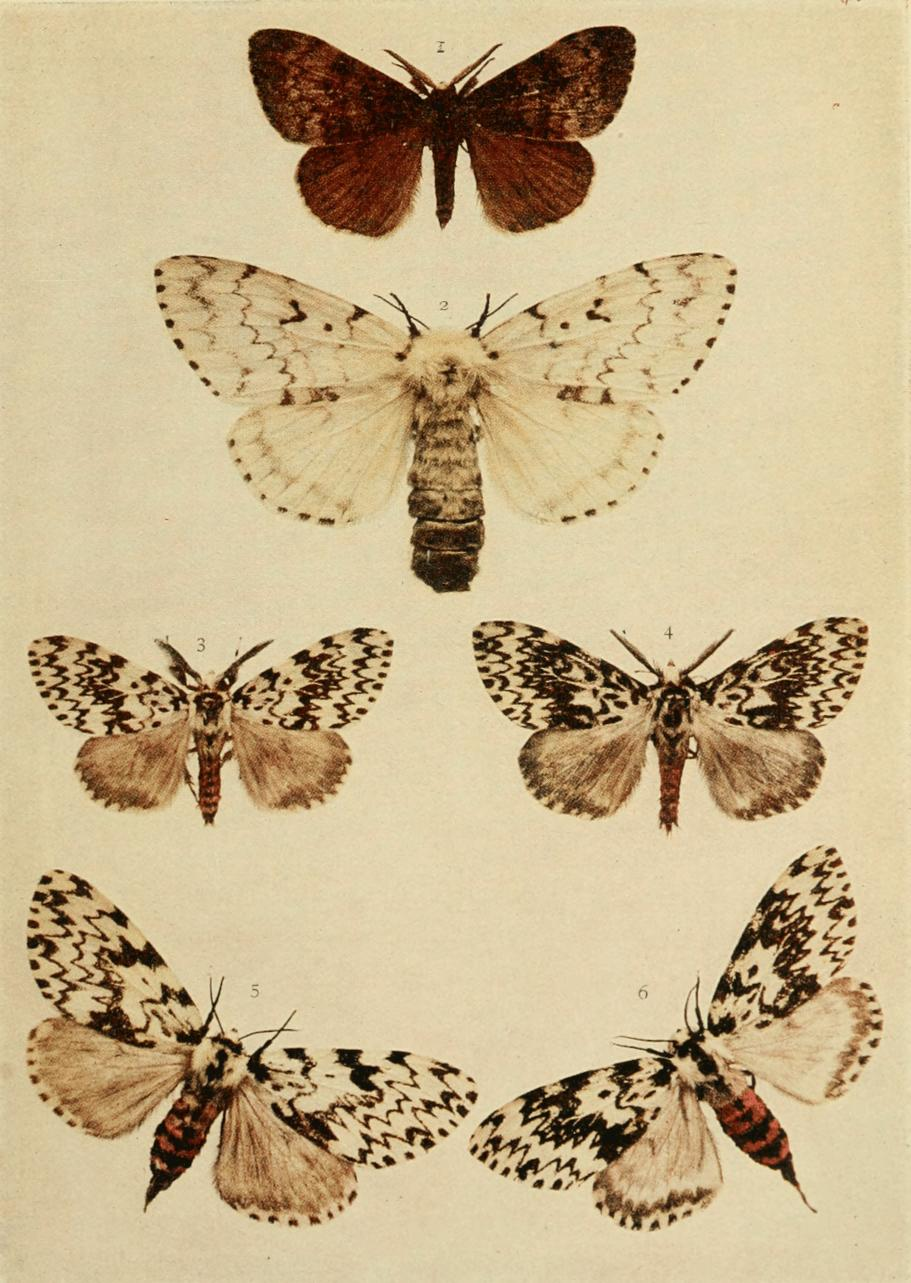
Illustration from The Moths of the British Isles

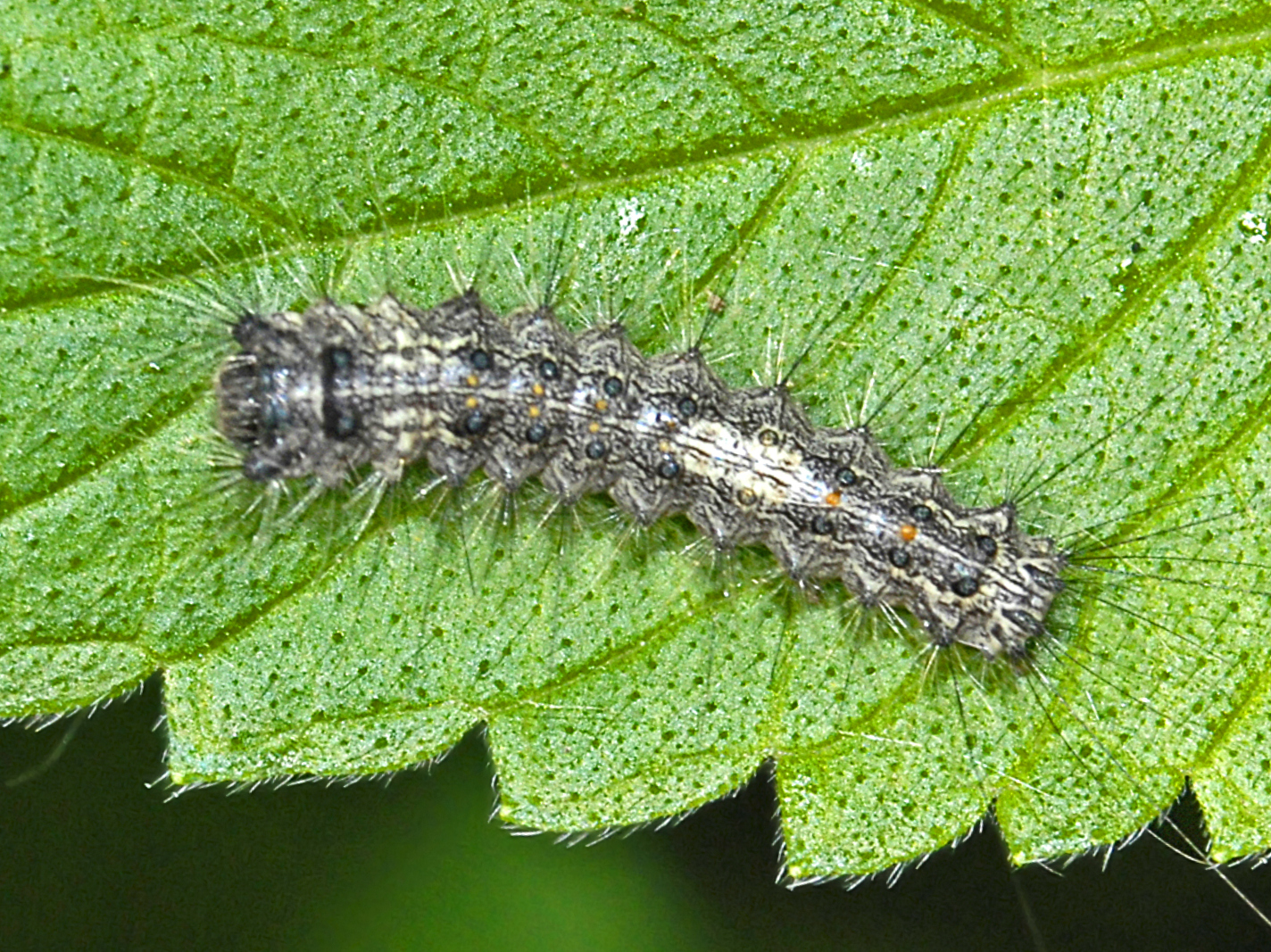
Caterpillar

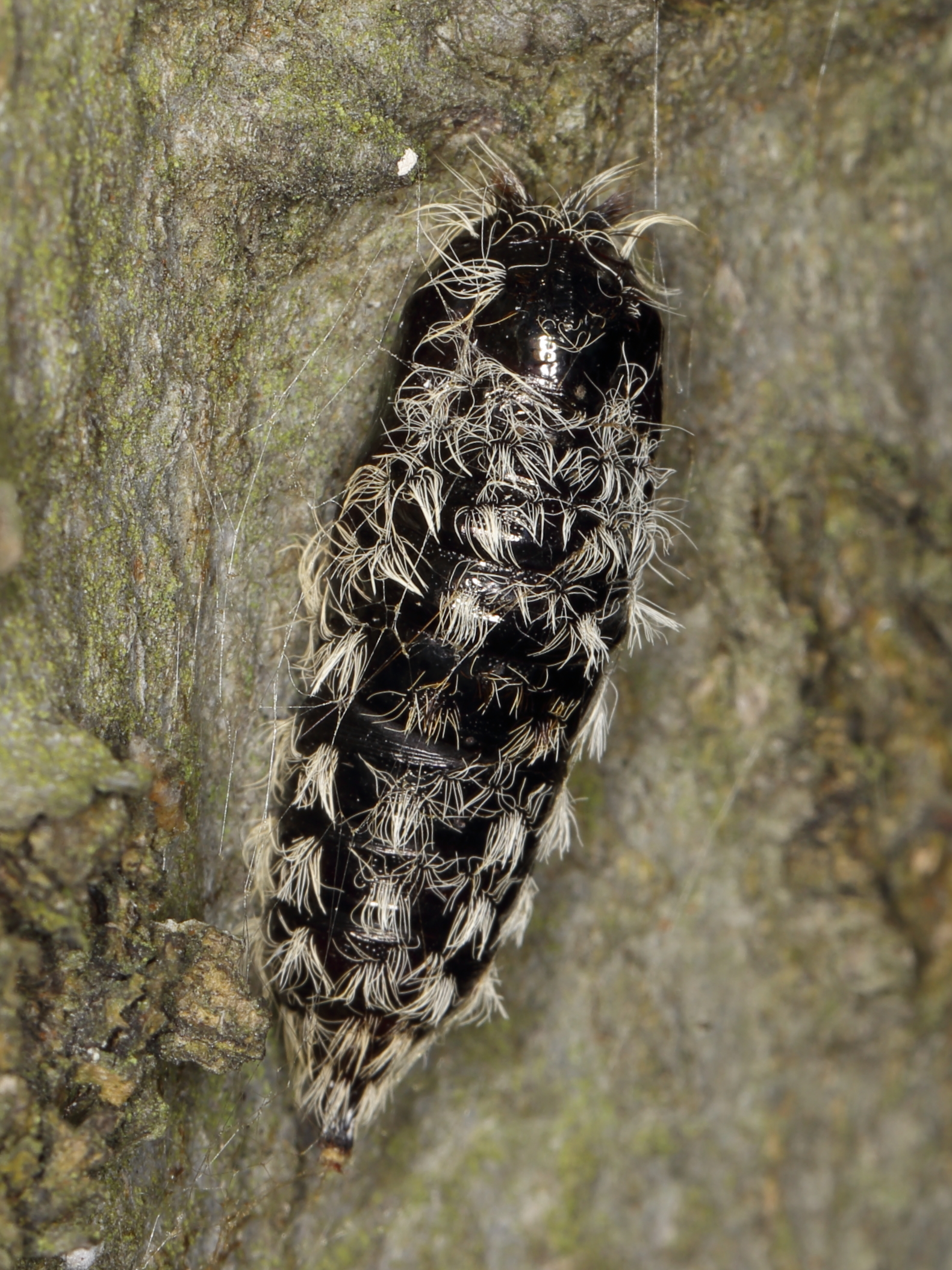
Pupa

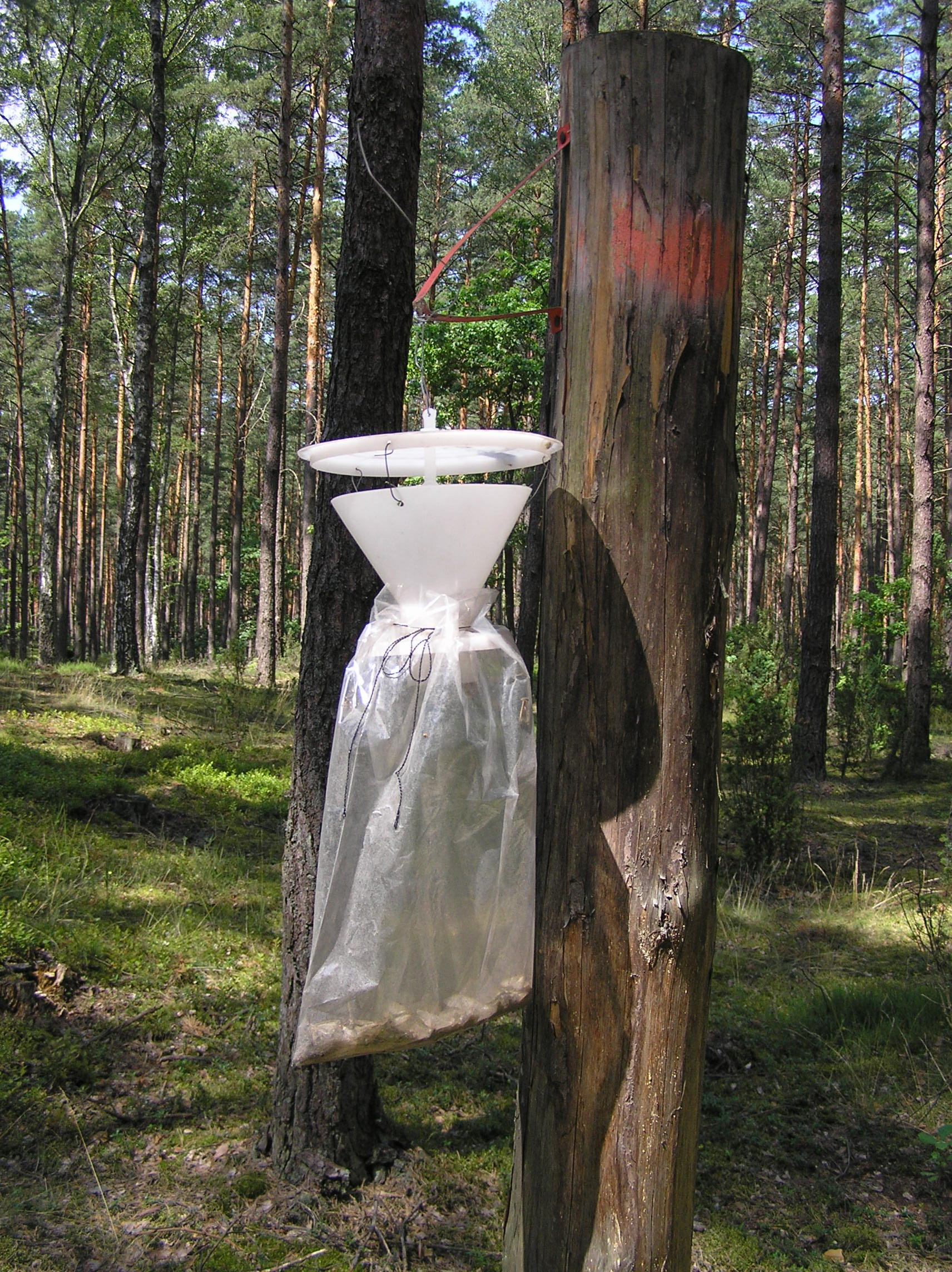
Pheromone trap for Lymantria monacha

== See also ==
- Forest protection
- Lepidoptera
- Lymantriidae
