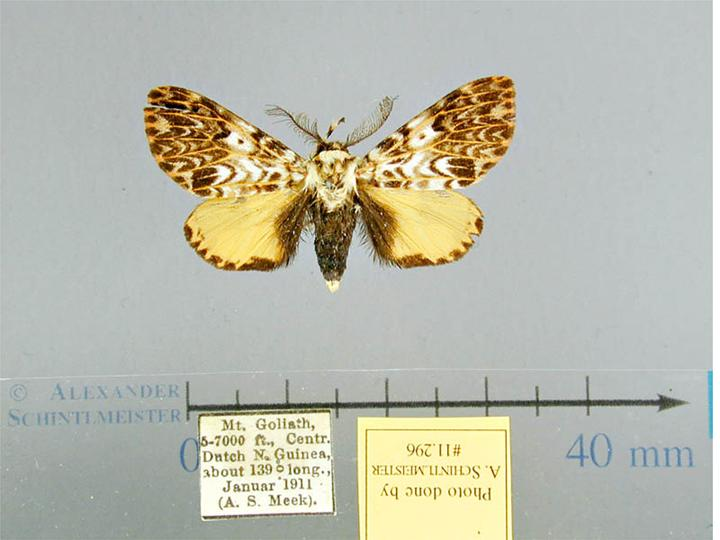

Scientific classification
- Domain: Eukaryota
- Kingdom: Animalia
- Phylum: Arthropoda
- Class: Insecta
- Order: Lepidoptera
- Superfamily: Noctuoidea
- Family: Erebidae
- Genus: Lymantria
- Species: L. kebeae

Binomial name
- Lymantria kebeae Bethune-Baker, 1904

= Lymantria kebeae =

Species of moth

Lymantria kebeae is a species of moth of the family Erebidae. It is found in Papua New Guinea.
