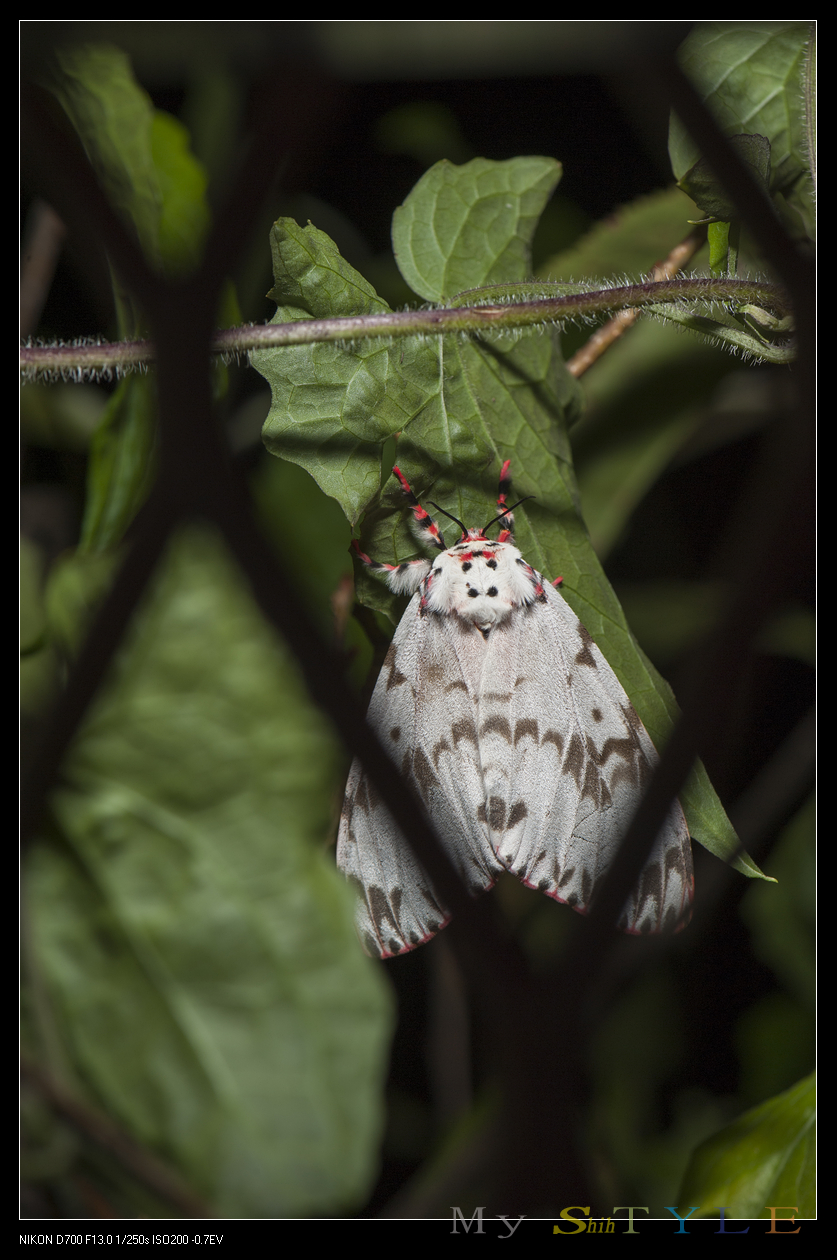
- Lymantria mathura aurora

Scientific classification
- Kingdom: Animalia
- Phylum: Arthropoda
- Clade: Pancrustacea
- Class: Insecta
- Order: Lepidoptera
- Superfamily: Noctuoidea
- Family: Erebidae
- Genus: Lymantria
- Species: L. mathura

Binomial name
- Lymantria mathura Moore, 1866

Synonyms
- Porthetria mathura; Ocneria mathura; Lymantria aurora Butler, 1877; Lymantria fusca Leech, 1888; Lymantria umbrina Moore, 1879; Lymantria mathura aurora

= Lymantria mathura =

Rosy gypsy moth

Species of moth

Lymantria mathura, the rosy gypsy moth, is a species of moth of the family Erebidae found in the Russian Far East, Nepal, Japan (Hokkaido, Honshu, Kyushu), the Korean Peninsula, northern India and China (at least Hebei, Heilongjiang, Jilin also in the west). The species was first described by Frederic Moore in 1866.

The wingspan is 40–50mm for males and 70–90mm for females. Larvae disperse through ballooning, covering greater distances compared to the Lymantria dispar and exhibiting high rates of settling. Larvae have also been recorded feeding on Terminalia, Shorea, Quercus, Mangifera, Eugenia and Mitragyna. It is considered a pest, since it is a major defoliator of deciduous trees. Their larvae exhibit intraspecific variation to polyphenol metabolism depending on their host plant, allowing them to be polyphagous across multiple broadleaf species.

== Subspecies ==
- Lymantria mathura mathura
- Lymantria mathura aurora Butler, 1877 (Japan, Korea, Amur, China, Taiwan)
- Lymantria mathura subpallida Okano, 1959 (Taiwan)

== Gallery ==
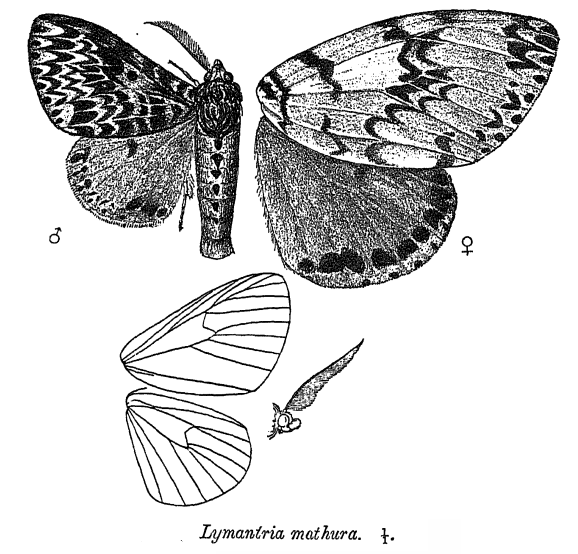
Illustration

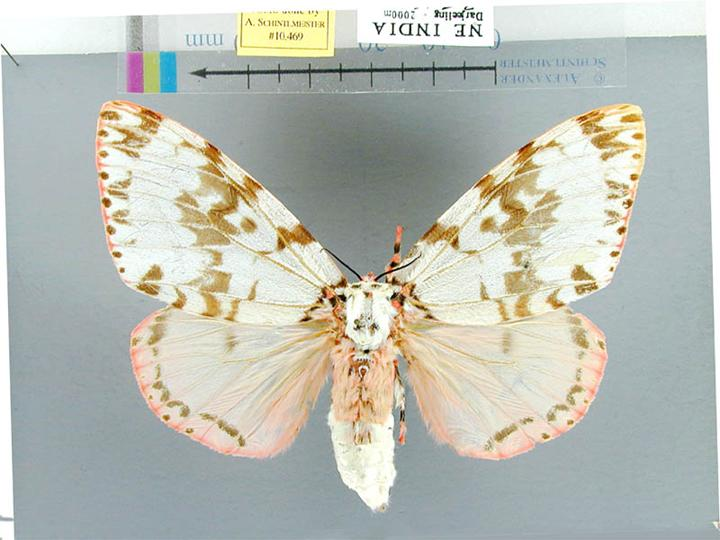
Female

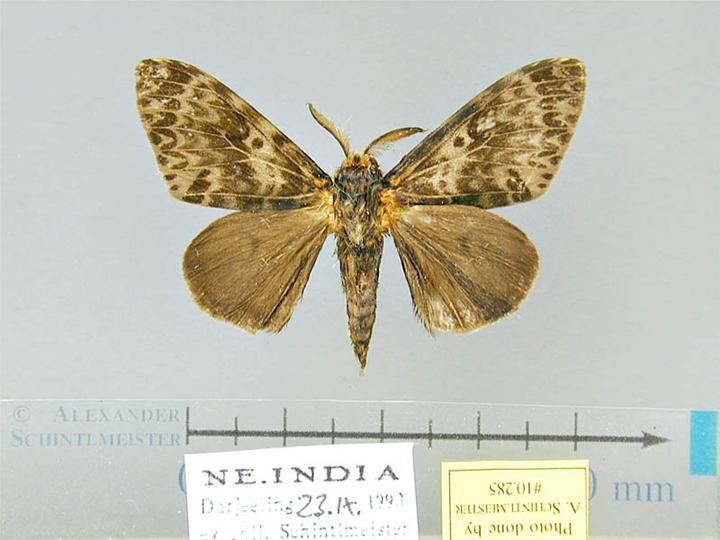
Male

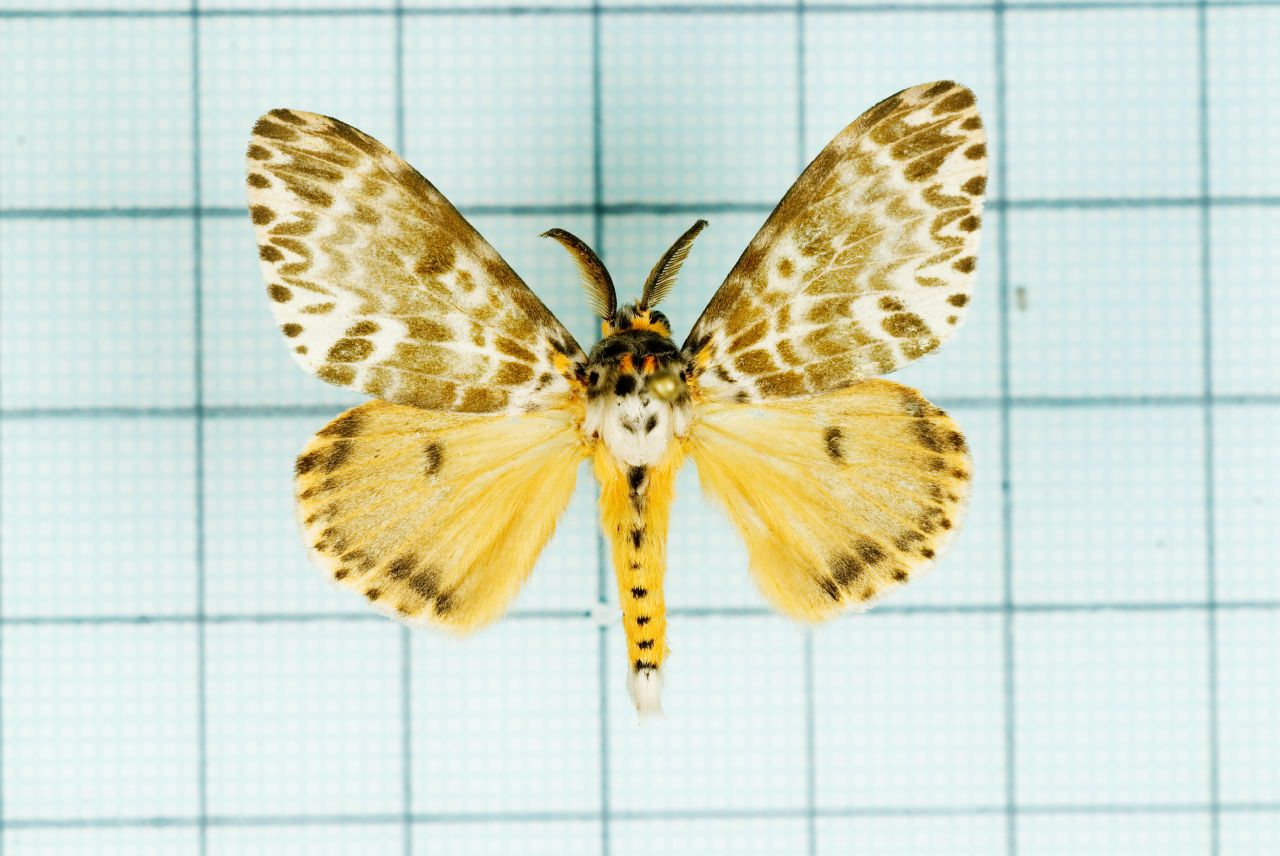
Lymantria mathura subpallida

== See also ==
- Gypsy moth
