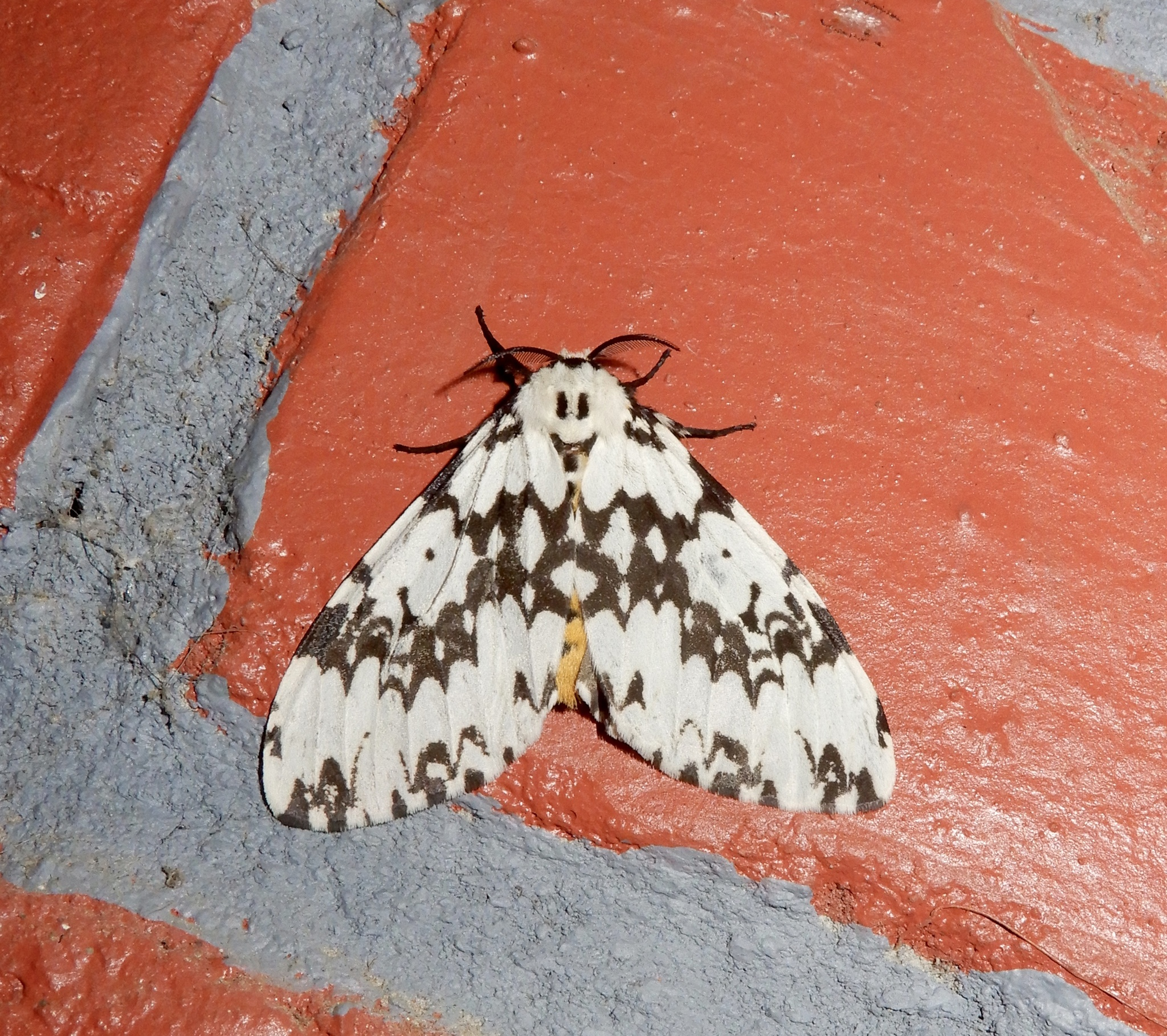

Scientific classification
- Domain: Eukaryota
- Kingdom: Animalia
- Phylum: Arthropoda
- Class: Insecta
- Order: Lepidoptera
- Superfamily: Noctuoidea
- Family: Erebidae
- Genus: Lymantria
- Species: L. fuliginosa

Binomial name
- Lymantria fuliginosa Moore, 1883

= Lymantria fuliginosa =

Species of moth

Lymantria fuliginosa is a moth of the family Erebidae first described by Frederic Moore in 1883. It is found in Sri Lanka and India.
