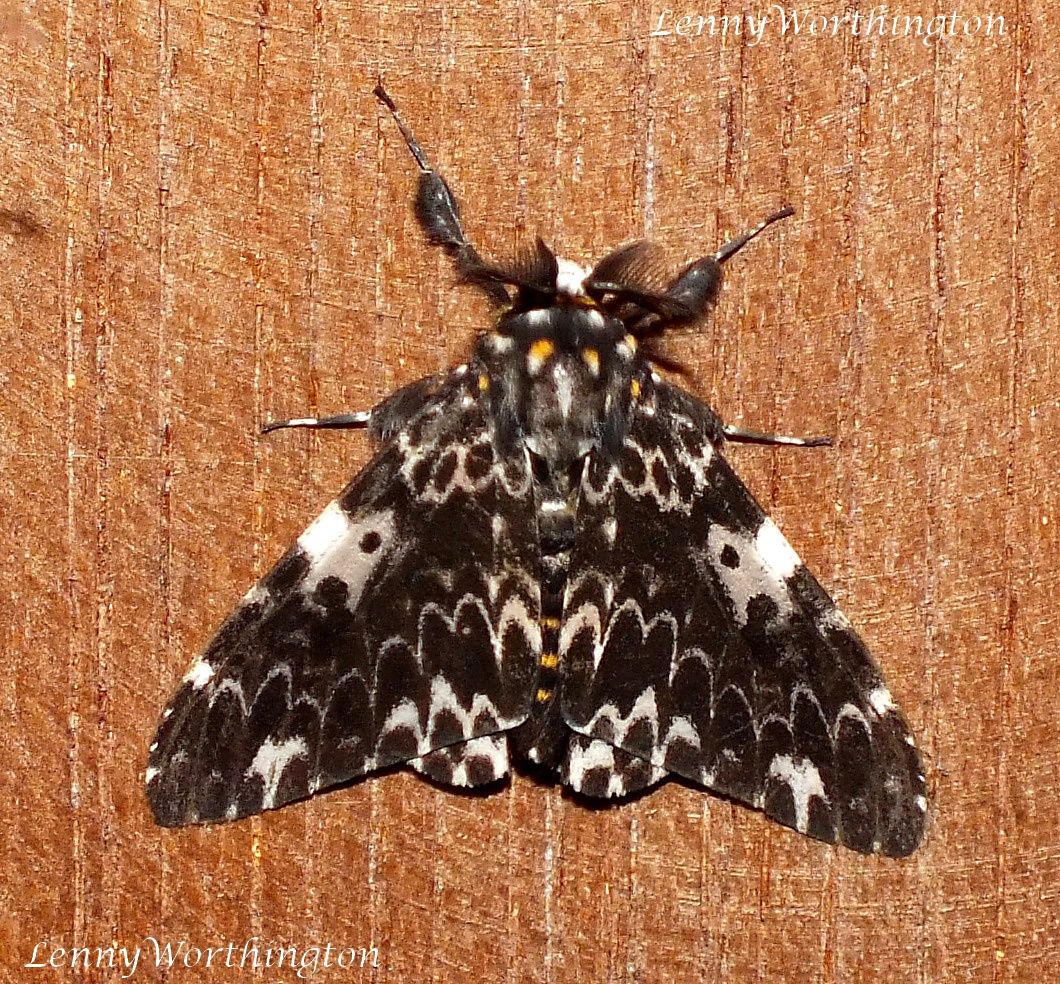

Scientific classification
- Kingdom: Animalia
- Phylum: Arthropoda
- Class: Insecta
- Order: Lepidoptera
- Superfamily: Noctuoidea
- Family: Erebidae
- Genus: Lymantria
- Species: L. marginata

Binomial name
- Lymantria marginata Walker, 1855

Synonyms
- Lymantria pusilla Felder, 1874; Liparis marginata Swinhoe, 1923

= Lymantria marginata =

Species of insect

Lymantria marginata is a moth of the family Erebidae first described by Francis Walker in 1855. It is found in India, Bangladesh, Sri Lanka and Thailand.

The wingspan of the male is 41 mm and the female is about 52 mm. Palpi porrect (extending forward) and hairy. Sexes show sexual dimorphism. Antennae of male bipectinate (comb like on both sides) with long branches and female has pectinate (comb like on one side) antennae. Male with head and thorax pale fuscous with black spots. There is a line which runs behind the head. Head yellowish. Two orange spots found on mesothorax. Female has white forewings with black patches. Abdomen orange with a black line on vertex. Anal tuft black. The caterpillar is a serious pest on Mangifera indica and Durio zibethinus.
