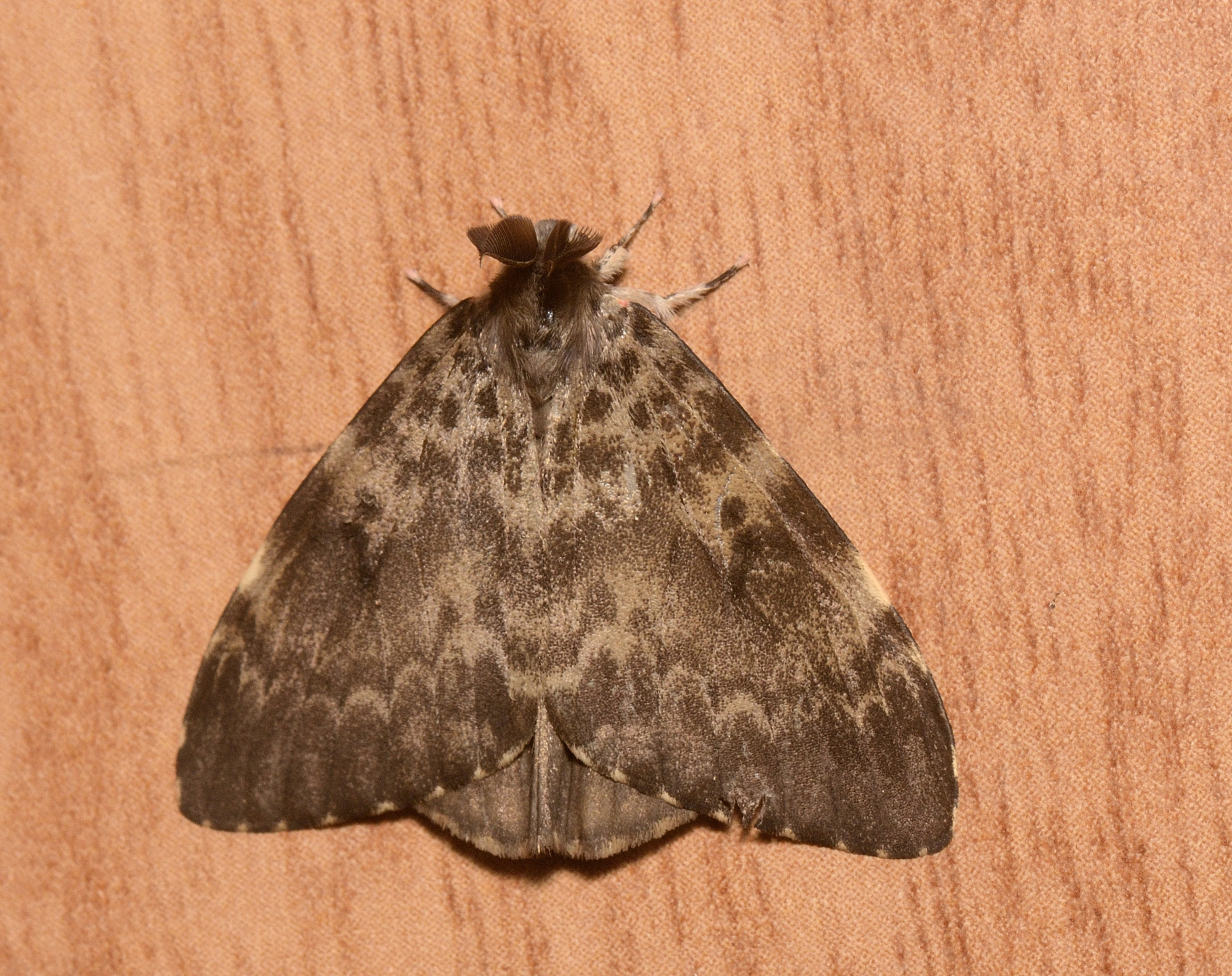
- Adult

Scientific classification
- Kingdom: Animalia
- Phylum: Arthropoda
- Class: Insecta
- Order: Lepidoptera
- Superfamily: Noctuoidea
- Family: Erebidae
- Genus: Lymantria
- Species: L. ampla

Binomial name
- Lymantria ampla (Walker, 1855)

Synonyms
- Enome ampla Walker, 1855; ?Aclonophlebia disparina Hering, 1926; Enome ampla Swinhoe, 1923

= Lymantria ampla =

Species of moth

Lymantria ampla is a moth of the family Erebidae first described by Francis Walker in 1855. It is found in India and Sri Lanka.

== Biology ==
The caterpillar is a pest of cotton, Pelargonium, Quisqualis indica, Ricinus communis, Rosa, Tectona grandis, Terminalia catappa, Terminalia paniculata, Theobroma cacao, Trewia nudiflora, Adina, Anacardium occidentale, Begonia, Cajanus cajan, Carissa carandas, Cassia fistula, Casuarina, Coffea, Crotalaria, Eucalyptus, Ficus, Ficus religiosa, Lagerstroemia indica, Lagerstroemia thorelii, Malus pumila and Mangifera indica.

== Control ==
Caterpillars can be destroyed by introducing natural parasites: Apanteles obliquae, Brachymeria porthetrialis and Cotesia glomeratus.

== Gallery ==
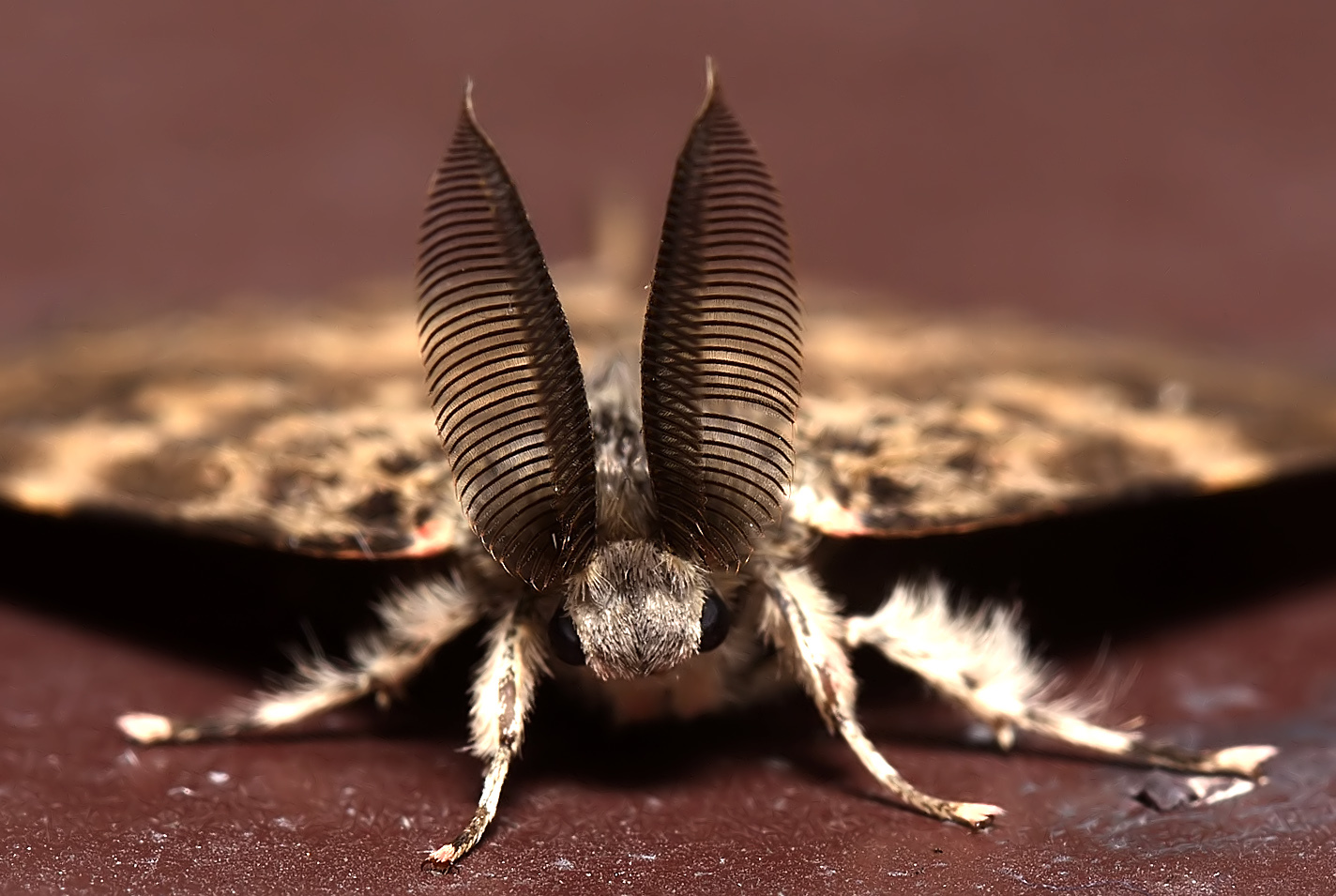
Head details

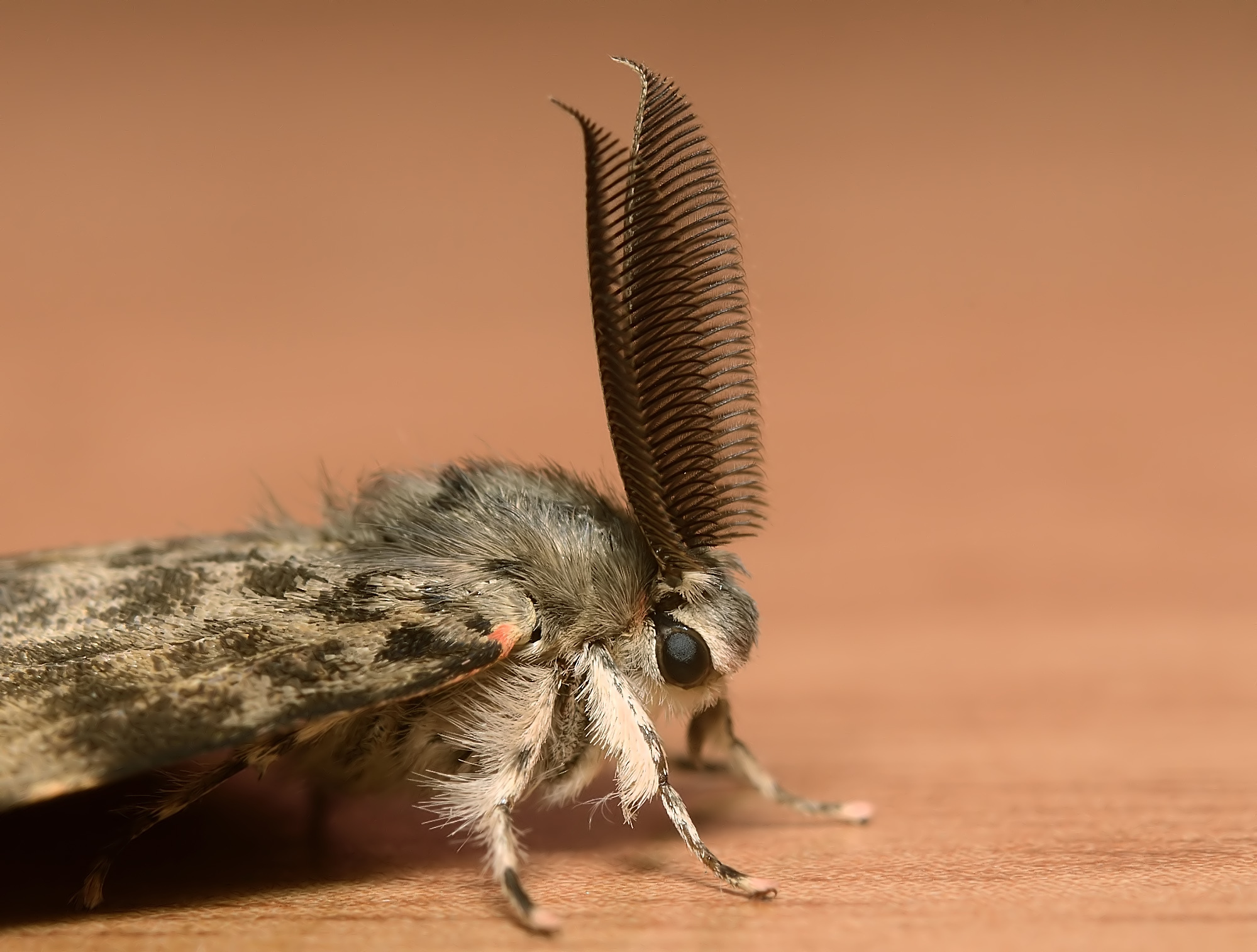
Side-view of head

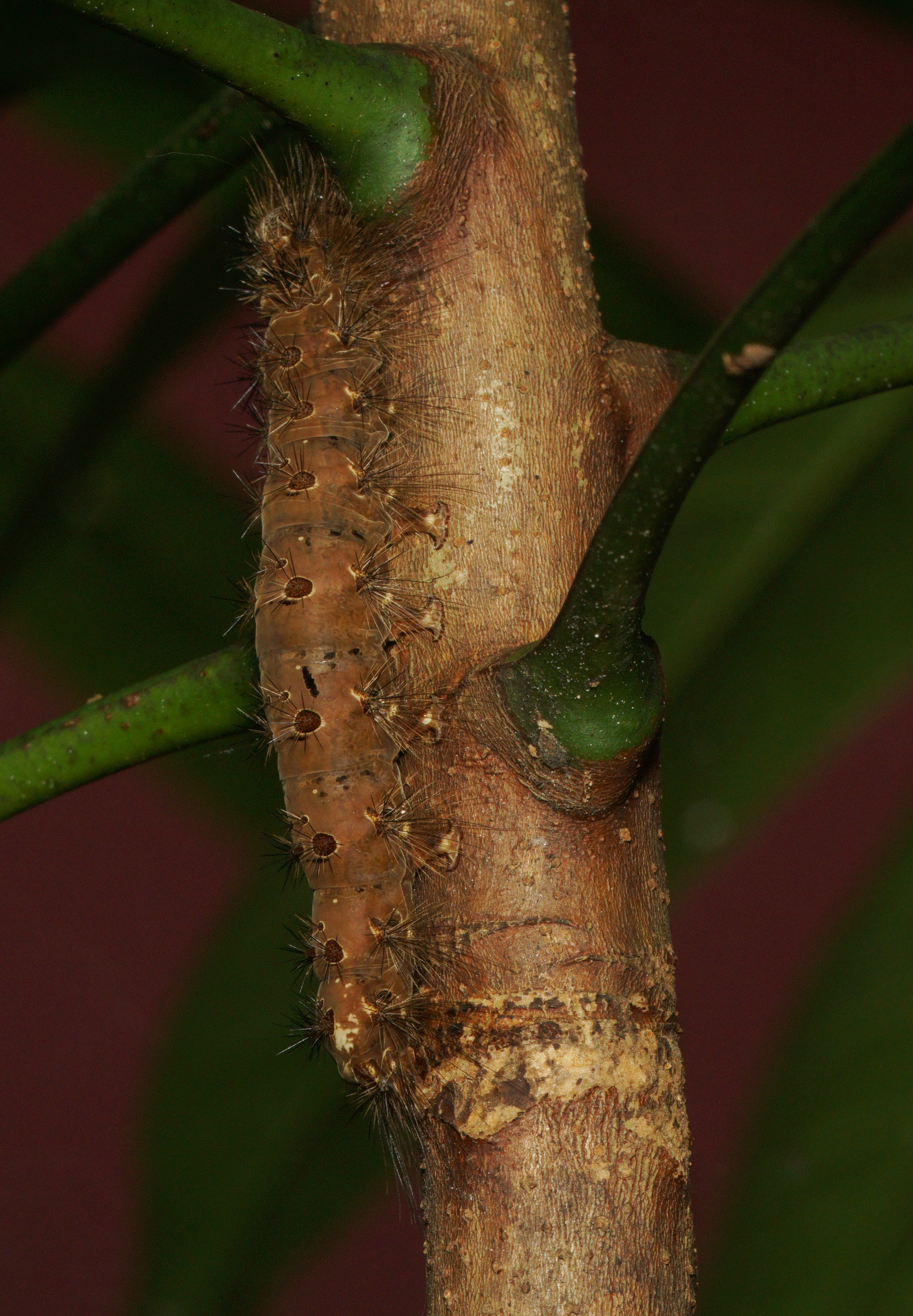
Caterpillar
