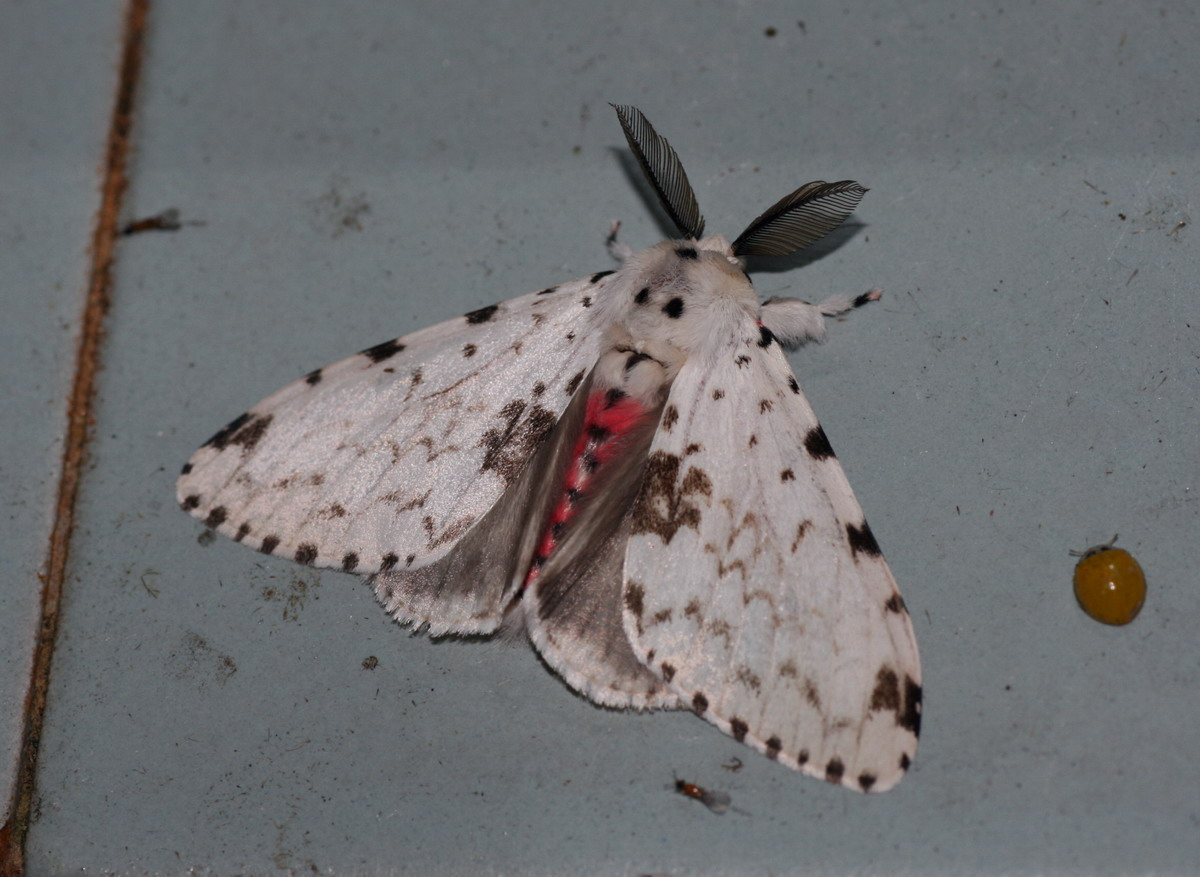

Scientific classification
- Domain: Eukaryota
- Kingdom: Animalia
- Phylum: Arthropoda
- Class: Insecta
- Order: Lepidoptera
- Superfamily: Noctuoidea
- Family: Erebidae
- Genus: Lymantria
- Species: L. brunneiplaga

Binomial name
- Lymantria brunneiplaga C. Swinhoe, 1903

= Lymantria brunneiplaga =

Species of moth

Lymantria brunneiplaga is a species of moth of the family Erebidae first described by Charles Swinhoe in 1903. It is found in Sundaland and the Philippines.

The wingspan is 48 mm for males and 65–75 mm for females.

Larvae have been recorded feeding on Paraserianthes (including P. falcataria (= Falcataria moluccana)), Combretum, Chromolaena, Mikania, Jacquemontia, Scleria, Cratoxylm, Piper and Trema species.
