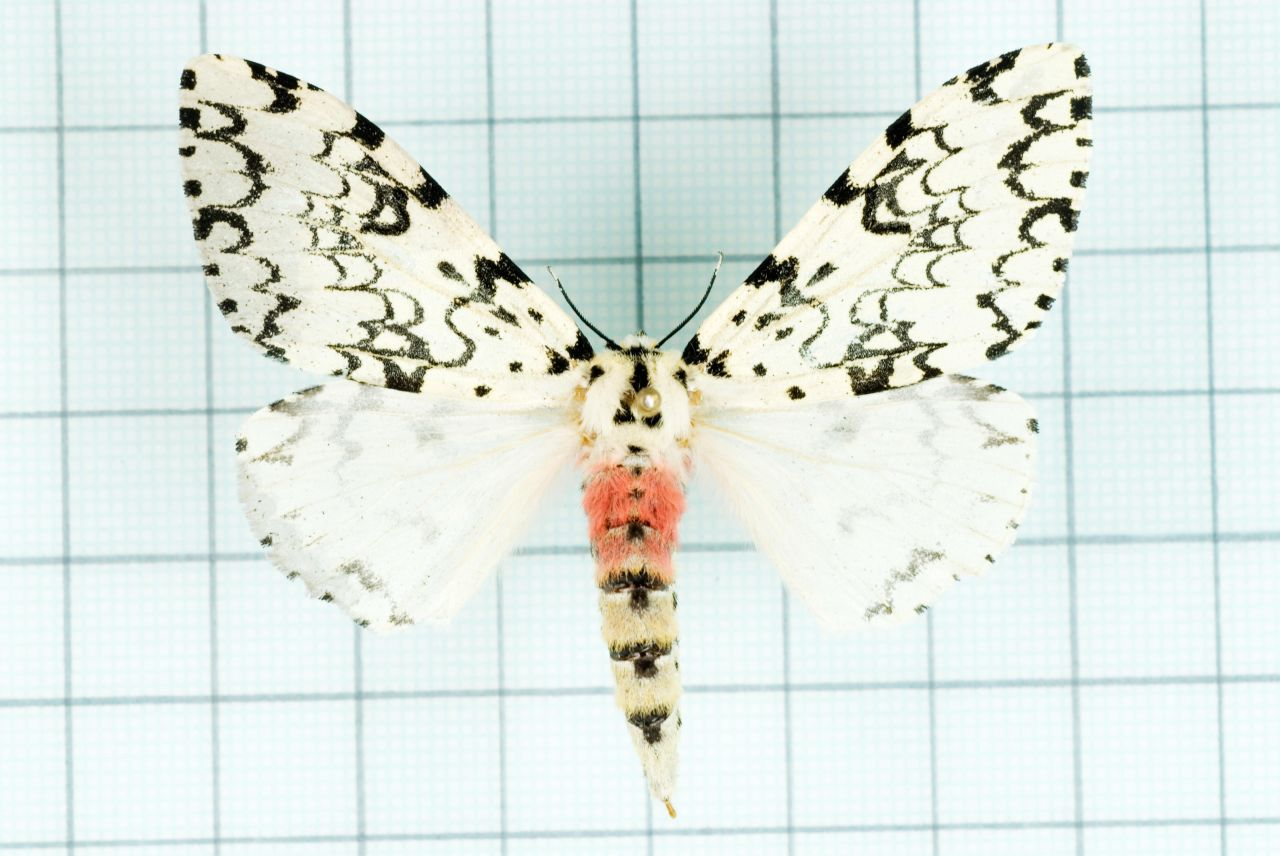

Scientific classification
- Kingdom: Animalia
- Phylum: Arthropoda
- Class: Insecta
- Order: Lepidoptera
- Superfamily: Noctuoidea
- Family: Erebidae
- Genus: Lymantria
- Species: L. concolor

Binomial name
- Lymantria concolor Walker, 1855

Synonyms
- Liparis concolor; Lymantria superans Walker, 1855; Lymantria micans Felder, 1874; Lymantria carnecolor Moore, 1888; Lymantria horishana Matsumura, 1931; Lymantria concolor lacteipennis Collenette, 1933

= Lymantria concolor =

Species of moth

Lymantria concolor is a moth of the family Erebidae first described by Francis Walker in 1855. It is found in Sikkim, the Himalayas, Taiwan and Thailand.

The wingspan is 40–54 mm.

The larvae defoliate fruit trees.

The secretions of Lymantria concolor caterpillars contain volatile secondary metabolites that serve as a defense against predators. The chemical composition of their secretions changes with age.
