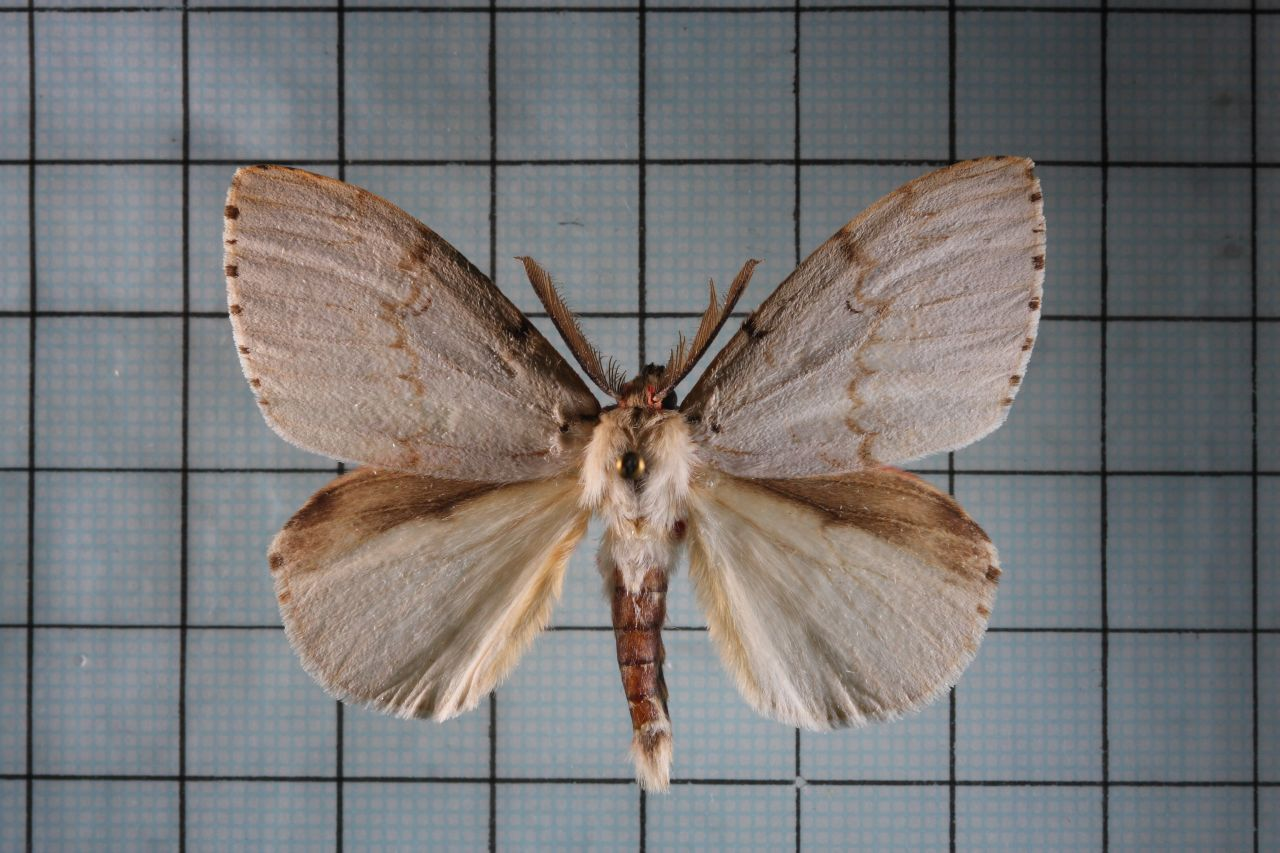

Scientific classification
- Domain: Eukaryota
- Kingdom: Animalia
- Phylum: Arthropoda
- Class: Insecta
- Order: Lepidoptera
- Superfamily: Noctuoidea
- Family: Erebidae
- Genus: Lymantria
- Species: L. xylina

Binomial name
- Lymantria xylina C. Swinhoe, 1903

Synonyms
- Liparis xylina

= Lymantria xylina =

Species of moth

Lymantria xylina, the casuarina moth or casuarina tussock moth, is a moth in the family Erebidae. The species was first described by Charles Swinhoe in 1903. It is found in Japan, Taiwan and the Chinese provinces of Fujian and Guangdong.

It is a very important forest pest in Taiwan, with outbreaks occurring every five to ten years. The larvae feed on a wide range of host plants, including over 65 species of broadleaf trees.

At least one virus is being investigated as a possible biopesticide.
