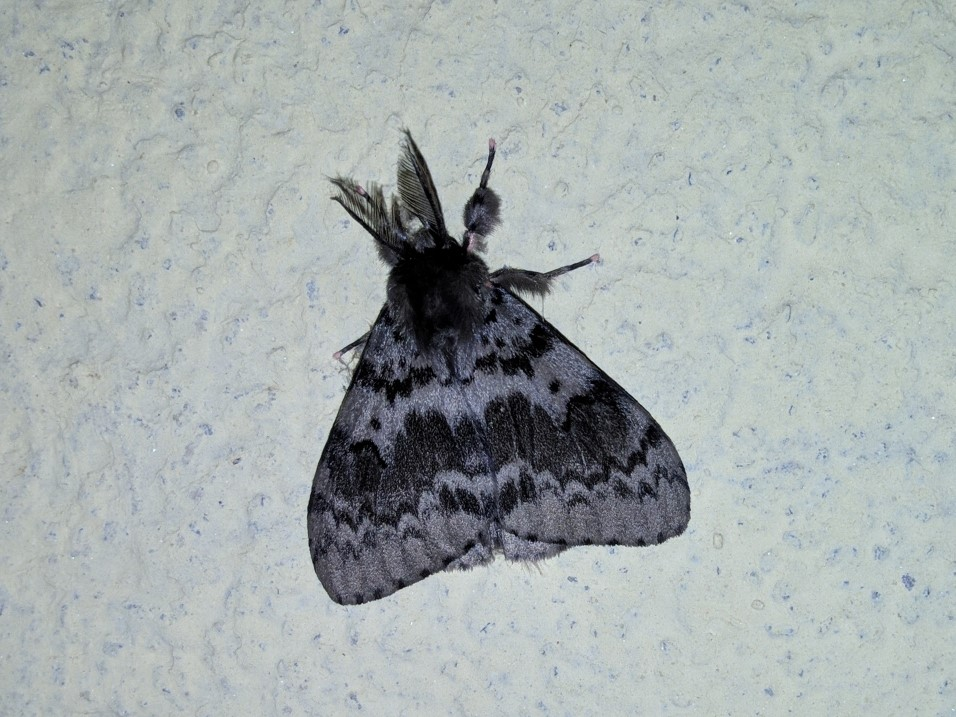

Scientific classification
- Kingdom: Animalia
- Phylum: Arthropoda
- Class: Insecta
- Order: Lepidoptera
- Superfamily: Noctuoidea
- Family: Erebidae
- Genus: Lymantria
- Species: L. incerta

Binomial name
- Lymantria incerta Walker, 1855

Synonyms
- Lymantria aryama Moore, 1859; Enome aryama Swinhoe, 1923; Enome incerta Swinhoe, 1923

= Lymantria incerta =

Species of moth

Lymantria incerta is a moth of the family Erebidae first described by Francis Walker in 1855. It is found in India and Sri Lanka.

Palpi porrect (extending forward) and hairy. Antennae bipectinate (comb like on both sides) with long branches. Head, thorax and abdomen red brown. A crimson line runs behind the head. Abdomen banded with crimson. Legs spotted with black and marked with crimson. Forewing greyish brown. The caterpillar is known to feed on Ziziphus jujuba and Ziziphus mauritiana.
