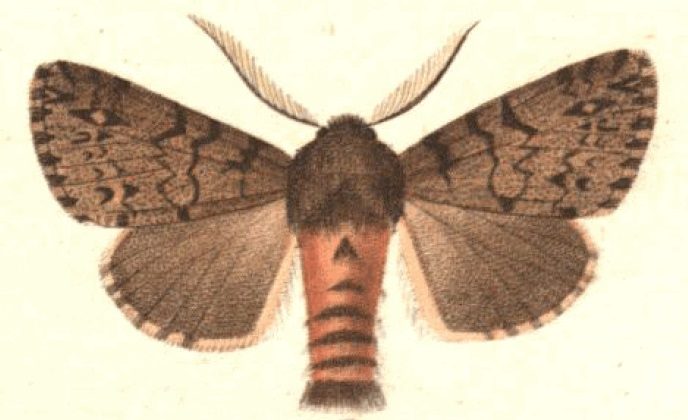

Scientific classification
- Kingdom: Animalia
- Phylum: Arthropoda
- Clade: Pancrustacea
- Class: Insecta
- Order: Lepidoptera
- Superfamily: Noctuoidea
- Family: Erebidae
- Genus: Lymantria
- Species: L. atlantica

Binomial name
- Lymantria atlantica (Rambur, 1837)

Synonyms
- Liparis atlantica Rambur, 1842; Ocneria atlantica; Lymantria mus Oberthür, 1916; Lymantria atlantica maura Oberthür, 1916

= Lymantria atlantica =

Species of moth

Lymantria atlantica is a moth of the family Erebidae. It was described by Rambur in 1837. It is found in Spain, Portugal and France, as well as on Corsica, Sardinia, Malta and Crete. Outside of Europe, it is found in North Africa (Algeria, Mauritania and Morocco). The habitat consists of garrigue-like scrub and coastal areas.

The wingspan is 25–35 mm. There are two or three generations per year with adults on wing from March to October.

The larvae feed on Pistacia lenticus.
