= Lymantria detersa =

Scientific classification
- Kingdom: Animalia
- Phylum: Arthropoda
- Class: Insecta
- Order: Lepidoptera
- Superfamily: Noctuoidea
- Family: Erebidae
- Genus: Lymantria
- Species: L. detersa

Binomial name
- Lymantria detersa Walker, 1865

Species of moth

Lymantria detersa is a moth of the family Erebidae first described by Francis Walker in 1865. It is found in India.

The caterpillar feeds on Casuarina equisetifolia.

One subspecies, Lymantria detersa costalis Walker, 1865, is recognized.
