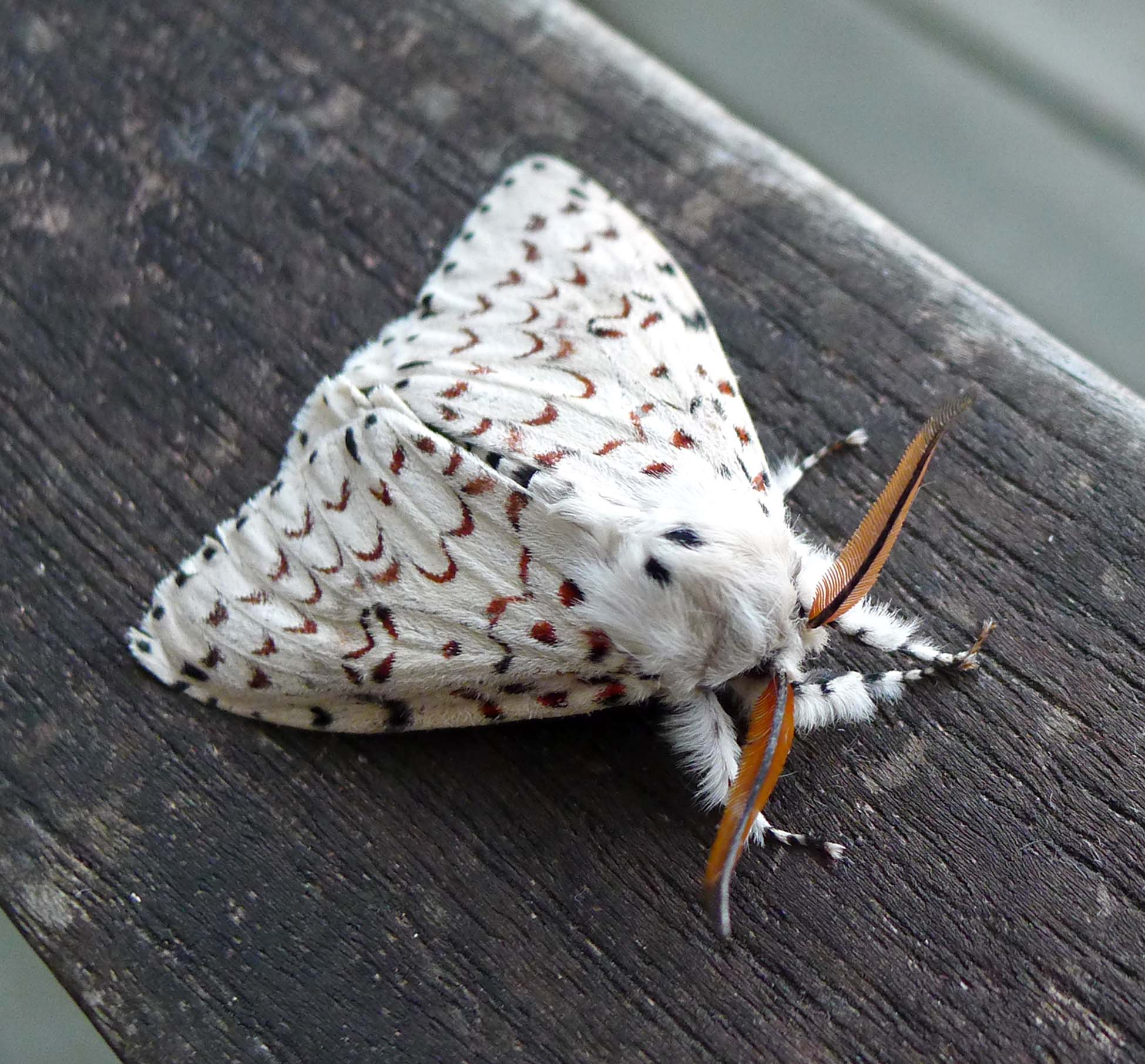
- Lymantria nephrographa in Queensland, Australia

Scientific classification
- Domain: Eukaryota
- Kingdom: Animalia
- Phylum: Arthropoda
- Class: Insecta
- Order: Lepidoptera
- Superfamily: Noctuoidea
- Family: Erebidae
- Subfamily: Lymantriinae
- Tribe: Lymantriini
- Genus: Lymantria; Hübner, 1819

Synonyms
- Porthetria Hübner, [1819]; Hypogymna Billberg, 1820; Sericaria Berthold, 1827; Psilura Stephens, 1828; Erasta Gistl, 1848; Morasa Walker, 1855; Enome Walker, 1855; Palasea Wallengren, 1863; Pegella Walker, 1866; Pagella Kozhanchikov, 1950; Sarothropyga Felder, 1874; Nagunda Moore, 1879; Barhona Moore, 1879; Pyramocera Butler, 1880; Lymantica Collenette, 1936

= Lymantria =

Genus of moths

Lymantria is a genus of tussock moths in the family Erebidae. They are widely distributed throughout Europe, Japan, India, Sri Lanka, Myanmar, Java, and Celebes. The genus was erected by Jacob Hübner in 1819.

== Description ==
In the male, the palpi are porrect (extending forward) and hairy. Antennae with long branches. Forewings with veins 3, 4 and 5 from close to angle of cell. Vein 6 from below upper angle. Veins 7 to 10 are stalked, where vein 7 being given off further from the cell than vein 10. Hindwings with veins 3, 4 and 5 from close to angle of cell. Vein 6 and 7 from upper angle. In female, antennae serrate (tooth like on one side). Wings either fully developed or partially reduced or completely reduced to scales.

== Species ==
The following species are included in the genus.

- Lymantria aboleta Staudinger, 1896
- Lymantria akemii Schintlmeister, 189?
- Lymantria albescens Matsumura, 1927
- Lymantria albimacula Wallengren, 1863
- Lymantria albolunulata Moore, 1879
- Lymantria alexandrae Schintlmeister, 1994
- Lymantria ampla Walker, 1855
- Lymantria antennata Walker, 1855
- Lymantria antica Walker, 1856
- Lymantria aomoriensis Matsumura, 1921
- Lymantria apicebrunnea Gaede, 1932
- Lymantria arete Fawcett, 1915
- Lymantria argyrochroa Collenette, 1935
- Lymantria arrheta Collenette, 1959
- Lymantria aryama Moore, 1859
- Lymantria ascetria Hübner, 1821
- Lymantria asiatica Vunkovskij, 1926
- Lymantria atala C. Swinhoe, 1923
- Lymantria atemeles Collenette, 1932
- Lymantria atlantica Rambur, 1842
- Lymantria atra Linstow., 1907
- Lymantria aurora Butler, 1877
- Lymantria bantaizana Matsumura, 1933
- Lymantria barica Mabille, 1878
- Lymantria barisana Collenette, 1933
- Lymantria barlowi Schintlmeister, 1994
- Lymantria beatrix Stoll, 1790
- Lymantria bhascara Moore, 1859
- Lymantria binotata Mabille, 1880
- Lymantria bisextilis Toxopeus, 1948
- Lymantria bivittata Moore, 1879
- Lymantria brotea Stoll, 1780
- Lymantria brunneata Kenrick, 1914
- Lymantria brunneiplaga C. Swinhoe, 1903
- Lymantria brunneoloma Pogue & Schaeffer, 2007
- Lymantria buruensis Collenette, 1933
- Lymantria caliginosa Collenette, 1933
- Lymantria canariensis Kenrick, 1914
- Lymantria capnodes Collenette, 1932
- Lymantria carnecolor Moore, 1888
- Lymantria carneola Moore, 1879
- Lymantria castanea Kenrick, 1914
- Lymantria castaneostriata Kenrick, 1914
- Lymantria ceballosi Agenjo, 1959
- Lymantria celebesa Collenette, 1947
- Lymantria chosenibia Bryk, 1949
- Lymantria chroma Collenette, 1947
- Lymantria concolor Walker, 1855
- Lymantria conspersa Hering, 1927
- Lymantria costalis Walker, 1865
- Lymantria cryptocloea Collenette, 1932
- Lymantria curvifera Walker, 1866
- Lymantria daraba Wiltshire, 1952
- Lymantria demotes Collenette,
- Lymantria destituta Staudinger, 1891
- Lymantria detersa Walker, 1865
- Lymantria dictyodigma Collenette, 1930
- Lymantria didymata Kenrick, 1914
- Lymantria diehli Schintlmeister, 198?
- Lymantria dispar Linnaeus, 1758 – gypsy moth
- Lymantria disparina Hering, 1926
- Lymantria dissoluta C. Swinhoe, 1903
- Lymantria diversa Turner, 1936
- Lymantria doreyensis Collenette, 1933
- Lymantria dubia Kenrick, 1914
- Lymantria dubiosa Aurivillius, 1894
- Lymantria dulcinea Butler, 1882
- Lymantria ekeikei Bethune-Baker, 1904
- Lymantria elassa Collenette, 1938
- Lymantria epelytes Collenette, 1936
- Lymantria eremita Ochsenheimer, 1810
- Lymantria faircloughi Holloway, 1999
- Lymantria finitorum Collenette, 1931
- Lymantria flavicilia Hampson, 1910
- Lymantria flavoneura Joicey, 1916
- Lymantria formosana Matsumura, 1911
- Lymantria fuliginea Butler, 1880
- Lymantria fuliginosa Moore, 1883
- Lymantria fumida Butler, 1877
- Lymantria fumosa Saalmüller, 1884
- Lymantria fusca Leech, 1888
- Lymantria galinaria C. Swinhoe, 1903
- Lymantria ganaha C. Swinhoe, 1903
- Lymantria ganara Moore, 1859
- Lymantria ganaroides Strand, 1917
- Lymantria grandis Walker, 1855
- Lymantria grisea Moore, 1879
- Lymantria griseipennis Kozhanchikov, 1950
- Lymantria griseostriata Kenrick, 1914
- Lymantria grisescens Staudinger, 1887
- Lymantria hadina Butler, 1881
- Lymantria harimuda Roepke, 1937
- Lymantria hemipyra Collenette, 1932
- Lymantria hilaris Voll., 1863
- Lymantria hollowayi Schintlmeister, 198?
- Lymantria horishana Matsumura, 1931
- Lymantria horishanella Matsumura, 1927
- Lymantria hypobolimaea Collenette, 1959
- Lymantria ichorina Butler, 1884
- Lymantria idea Bryk, 1949
- Lymantria incerta Walker, 1855
- Lymantria infuscata Okano, 1959
- Lymantria inordinata Walker, 1865
- Lymantria iris Strand, 1910
- Lymantria japonica Motschulsky, 1860
- Lymantria joannisi Le Cerf, 1921
- Lymantria kanara Collenette, 1951
- Lymantria kebeae Bethune-Baker, 1904
- Lymantria kettlewelli Collenette, 1953
- Lymantria kinta Collenette, 1932
- Lymantria kobesi Schintlmeister, 1994
- Lymantria kolthoffi Bryk, 1949
- Lymantria komarovi Christoph, 1882
- Lymantria koreibia Bryk, 1949
- Lymantria kosemponis Strand, 1914
- Lymantria kruegeri Turati, 1912
- Lymantria lacteipennis Collenette, 1933
- Lymantria lamda Collenette, 1936
- Lymantria lapidicola Herrich-Schäffer, 1852
- Lymantria lateralis Bryk, 1949
- Lymantria lepcha Moore, 1879
- Lymantria leucerythra Collenette, 1930
- Lymantria leucophaes Collenette, 1936
- Lymantria libella C. Swinhoe, 1904
- Lymantria loacana Semper, 1898
- Lymantria lucescens Butler, 1881
- Lymantria lunata Stoll, 1781
- Lymantria lutea Boisduval, 1847
- Lymantria lutescens Aurivillius, 1920
- Lymantria lygaea Bethune-Baker, 1908
- Lymantria maculata Semper, 1898
- Lymantria maculosa Walker, 1855
- Lymantria malgassica Kenrick, 1914
- Lymantria marginalis Walker, 1862
- Lymantria marginata Walker, 1855
- Lymantria marwitzi Grumb., 1907
- Lymantria mathura Moore, 1865
- Lymantria matuta Bryk, 1949
- Lymantria maura Oberthür, 1916
- Lymantria melanopogon Strand, 1914
- Lymantria metarhoda Walker, 1862
- Lymantria metella Fawcett, 1915
- Lymantria micans Felder, 1874
- Lymantria microcyma Collenette, 1937
- Lymantria microstrigata Holloway, 1999
- Lymantria minahassa Collenette, 1932
- Lymantria miniata Grunb., 1907
- Lymantria minomonis Matsumura, 1933
- Lymantria minora van Eecke, 1828
- Lymantria mjobergi Aurivillius, 1920
- Lymantria modesta Walker, 1855
- Lymantria moesta C. Swinhoe, 1903
- Lymantria monacha Linnaeus, 1758
- Lymantria monoides Collenette, 1932
- Lymantria mosera H. Druce, 1898
- Lymantria mus Oberthür, 1916
- Lymantria narindra Moore, 1859
- Lymantria nebulosa Wileman, 1910
- Lymantria neirai Agenjo, 1959
- Lymantria nephrographa Turner, 1915
- Lymantria nesiobia Bryk, 1942
- Lymantria nigra Freyer, 1833
- Lymantria nigra Moore, 1888
- Lymantria nigricosta Matsumura, 1921
- Lymantria ninayi Bethune-Baker, 1910
- Lymantria nobunaga Nagano, 1909
- Lymantria novaguinensis Bethune-Baker, 1904
- Lymantria nudala Strand, 1915
- Lymantria oberthuri D. Lucas, 1906
- Lymantria obfuscata Walker, 1865
- Lymantria obsoleta Walker, 1855
- Lymantria oinoa Collenette, 1956
- Lymantria orestera Collenette, 1932
- Lymantria ornata Oberthür, 1923
- Lymantria ossea Toxopeus, 1948
- Lymantria pagon Holloway, 1999
- Lymantria panthera van Eecke, 1928
- Lymantria pelospila Turner, 1915
- Lymantria pendleburyi Collenette, 1932
- Lymantria phaeosericea Mabille, 1884
- Lymantria plumbalis Hampson, 1895
- Lymantria polioptera Collenette, 1934
- Lymantria polycyma Collenette, 1936
- Lymantria polysticta Collenette, 1929
- Lymantria postalba Inoue, 1956
- Lymantria postfusca C. Swinhoe, 1906
- Lymantria praetermissa Collenette, 1933
- Lymantria pramesta Moore, 1859
- Lymantria pruinosa Butler, 1879
- Lymantria pruinosa Hering, 1927
- Lymantria pulverea Pogue & Schaeffer, 2007
- Lymantria pusilla Felder, 1874
- Lymantria rhabdota Collenette, 1949
- Lymantria rhodina Walker, 1865
- Lymantria rhodopepla Felder, 1874
- Lymantria rosea Butler, 1879
- Lymantria roseicoxa Kenrick, 1914
- Lymantria roseola Matsumura, 1931
- Lymantria rosina Pagenstecher, 1900
- Lymantria rubroviridis Hering, 1917
- Lymantria rufofusca Mabille, 1899
- Lymantria rufotincta Kenrick, 1914
- Lymantria russula Collenette, 1933
- Lymantria rusticana Hering, 1927
- Lymantria sakaguchii Matsumura, 1927
- Lymantria semicincta Walker, 1855
- Lymantria serva Fabricius, 1793
- Lymantria servula Collenette, 1935
- Lymantria sinica Moore, 1879
- Lymantria subfusca Schulz., 1910
- Lymantria subpallida Okano, 1959
- Lymantria subrosea Walker, 1855
- Lymantria sugii Kishida, 1986
- Lymantria superans Walker, 1855
- Lymantria takasagonis Matsumura, 1933
- Lymantria todara Moore, 1879
- Lymantria tsushimensis Inoue, 1956
- Lymantria umbrifera Wileman, 1910
- Lymantria umbrina Moore, 1879
- Lymantria umbrosa Butler, 1881
- Lymantria uxor Saalmüller, 1884
- Lymantria variegata Kenrick, 1914
- Lymantria vinacea Moore, 1879
- Lymantria xylina C. Swinhoe, 1903
- Lymantria yunnanensis Collenette, 1933
