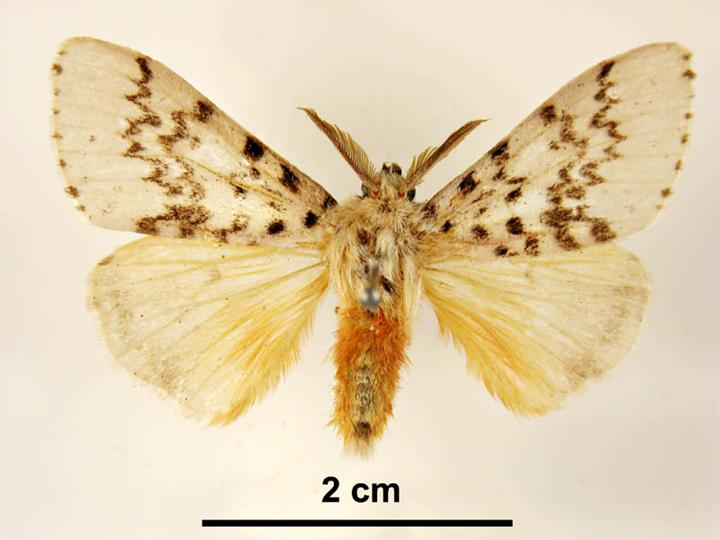

Scientific classification
- Kingdom: Animalia
- Phylum: Arthropoda
- Class: Insecta
- Order: Lepidoptera
- Superfamily: Noctuoidea
- Family: Erebidae
- Genus: Lymantria
- Species: L. antennata

Binomial name
- Lymantria antennata Walker, 1855

Synonyms
- Lymantria turneri Swinhoe, 1903; Lymantria undifera Strand, 1923; Pagella turneri

= Lymantria antennata =

Species of moth

Lymantria antennata is a species of moth of the family Erebidae. It is found along the east coast of Australia, including New South Wales and Queensland.

The wingspan is 50 mm for males.
