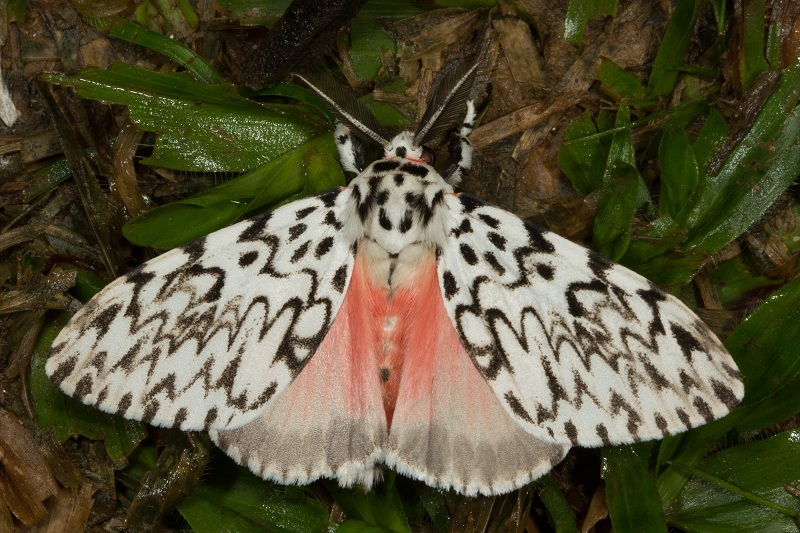
- Lymantria subrosea singapura

Scientific classification
- Kingdom: Animalia
- Phylum: Arthropoda
- Class: Insecta
- Order: Lepidoptera
- Superfamily: Noctuoidea
- Family: Erebidae
- Genus: Lymantria
- Species: L. subrosea

Binomial name
- Lymantria subrosea Walker, 1855

Synonyms
- Lymantria rosea Hampson, [1893]; ?Lymantria rosea Hampson, 1893; Liparis subrosea Swinhoe, 1923

= Lymantria subrosea =

Species of moth

Lymantria subrosea is a moth of the family Erebidae first described by Francis Walker in 1855. It is found from Sri Lanka to China and Sundaland, the Philippines, Sulawesi, Seram, the Lesser Sundas to Timor. The Sumatran population is categorized under the subspecies, Lymantria subrosea singapura.

The caterpillar is a pest of Terminalia cala and Shorea robusta.
