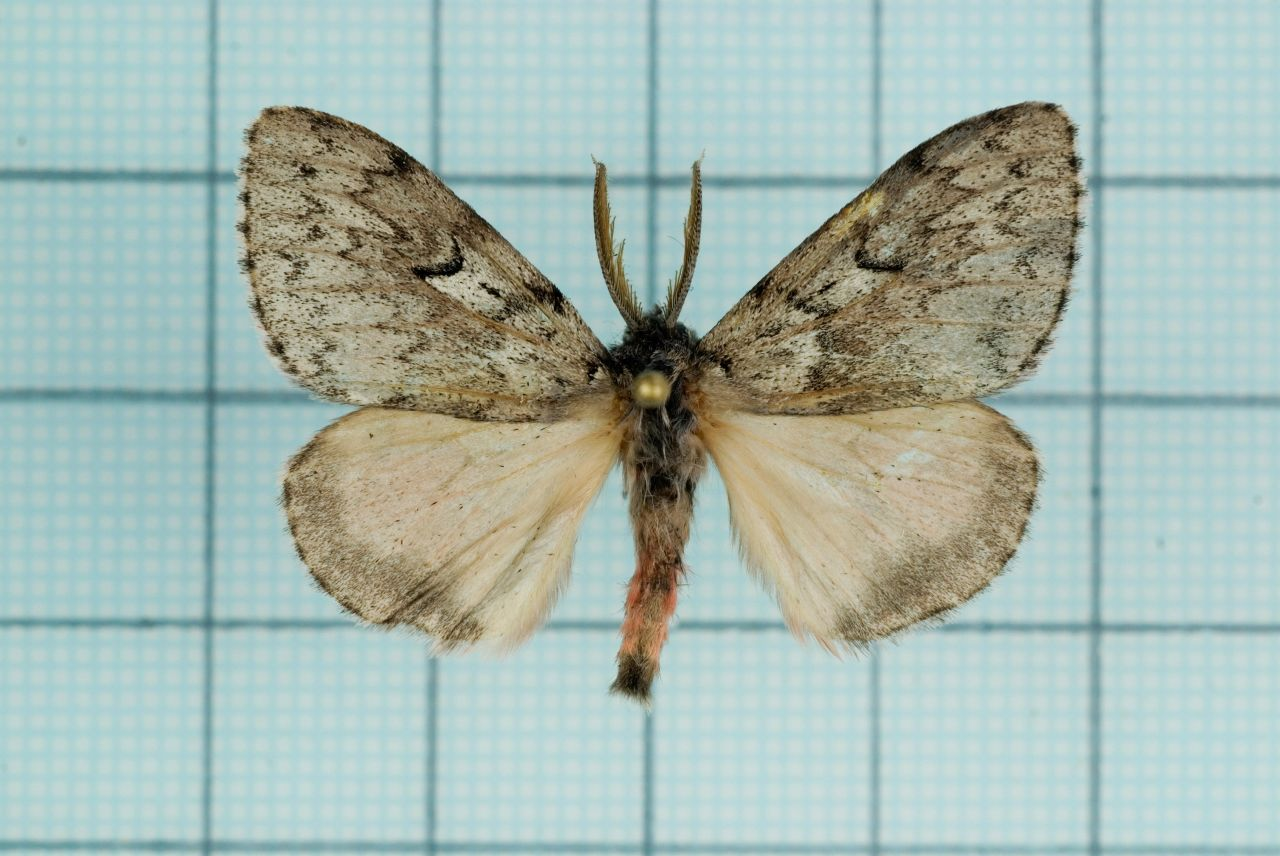

Scientific classification
- Domain: Eukaryota
- Kingdom: Animalia
- Phylum: Arthropoda
- Class: Insecta
- Order: Lepidoptera
- Superfamily: Noctuoidea
- Family: Erebidae
- Genus: Lymantria
- Species: L. umbrifera

Binomial name
- Lymantria umbrifera Wileman, 1910

Synonyms
- Lymantria baibarana Matsumura, 1927

= Lymantria umbrifera =

Species of moth

Lymantria umbrifera is a moth in the subfamily Lymantriinae. It was first described by entomologist Alfred Ernest Wileman in 1910. It is found in Taiwan and China.

The wingspan is 32–50 mm. Adults are on wing in February and May.
