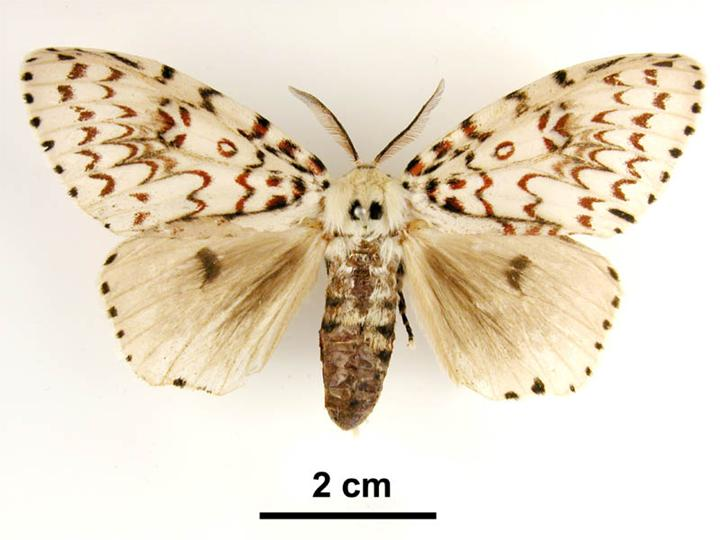

Scientific classification
- Domain: Eukaryota
- Kingdom: Animalia
- Phylum: Arthropoda
- Class: Insecta
- Order: Lepidoptera
- Superfamily: Noctuoidea
- Family: Erebidae
- Genus: Lymantria
- Species: L. nephrographa

Binomial name
- Lymantria nephrographa Turner, 1915

Synonyms
- Lymantria mjobergi Aurivillius, 1920

= Lymantria nephrographa =

Species of moth

Lymantria nephrographa is a species of moth of the family Erebidae. It is found in the rainforests of the mid-east coast of Australia, including New South Wales and Queensland.

The wingspan is about 70 mm. The wings are white with red-brown zig-zag lines. The hindwings are powdered brown with usually a conspicuous centre spot. There is a row of black dots running along the edges of the forewings and hindwings.
