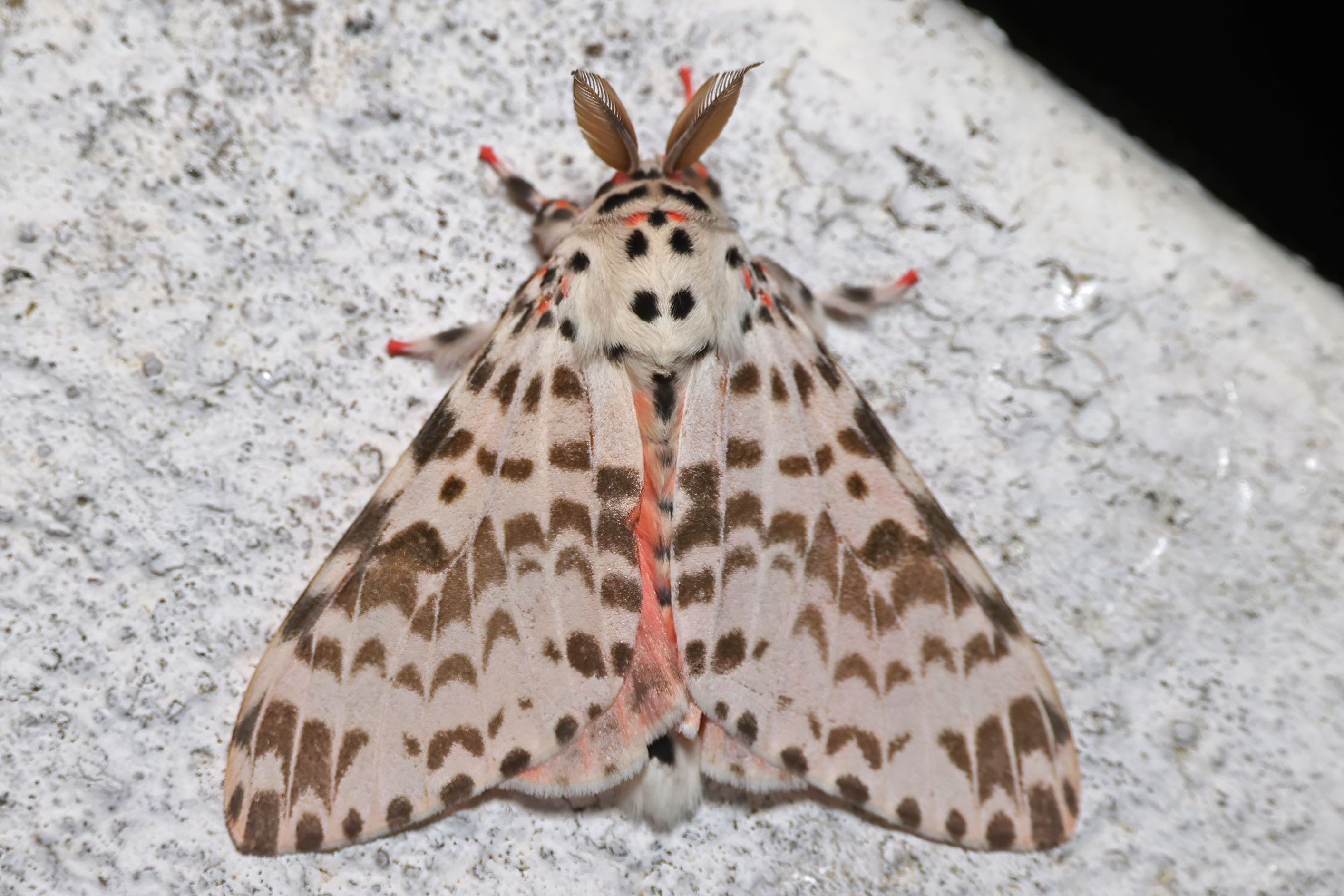
- Male, Sinharaja Forest, Viharahena

Scientific classification
- Kingdom: Animalia
- Phylum: Arthropoda
- Class: Insecta
- Order: Lepidoptera
- Superfamily: Noctuoidea
- Family: Erebidae
- Genus: Lymantria
- Species: L. grandis

Binomial name
- Lymantria grandis Walker, 1855

Synonyms
- Lymantria maculosa Walker, 1855; Lymantria metarhoda Walker, 1862; Liparis grandis Swinhoe, 1923

= Lymantria grandis =

Species of moth

Lymantria grandis is a moth of the family Erebidae first described by Francis Walker in 1855. It is found in Sri Lanka.
