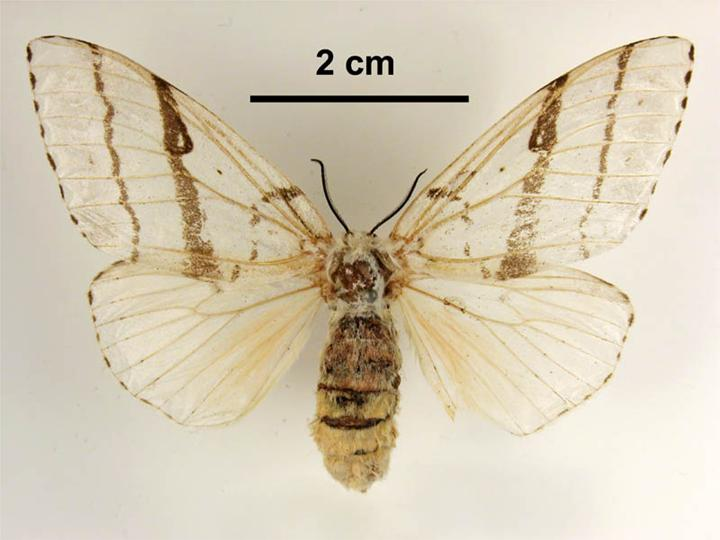
- Female
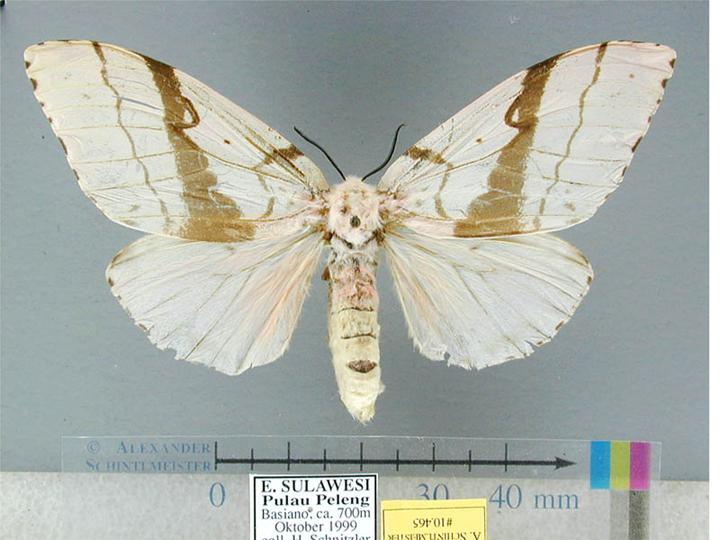
- Lymantria lunata curvifera

Scientific classification
- Domain: Eukaryota
- Kingdom: Animalia
- Phylum: Arthropoda
- Class: Insecta
- Order: Lepidoptera
- Superfamily: Noctuoidea
- Family: Erebidae
- Genus: Lymantria
- Species: L. lunata

Binomial name
- Lymantria lunata (Stoll, 1782)

Synonyms
- Bombyx lunata Stoll, [1782]; Pegella ichorina Butler, 1884; Lymantria lunatoides Strand, 1923; Lymantria diversa Turner, 1936; Pegella diversa

= Lymantria lunata =

Species of moth

Lymantria lunata, the luna gypsy moth, is a moth of the family Erebidae. The species was first described by Caspar Stoll in 1782. It is found in Southeast Asia, from India to the northeast coast of Australia.

The wingspan is about 60 mm.

The larvae have been recorded feeding on Mangifera indica, Buchanania muelleri and Ficus benjamina.

== Subspecies ==
- Lymantria lunata lunata
- Lymantria lunata diversa
- Lymantria lunata curvifera
