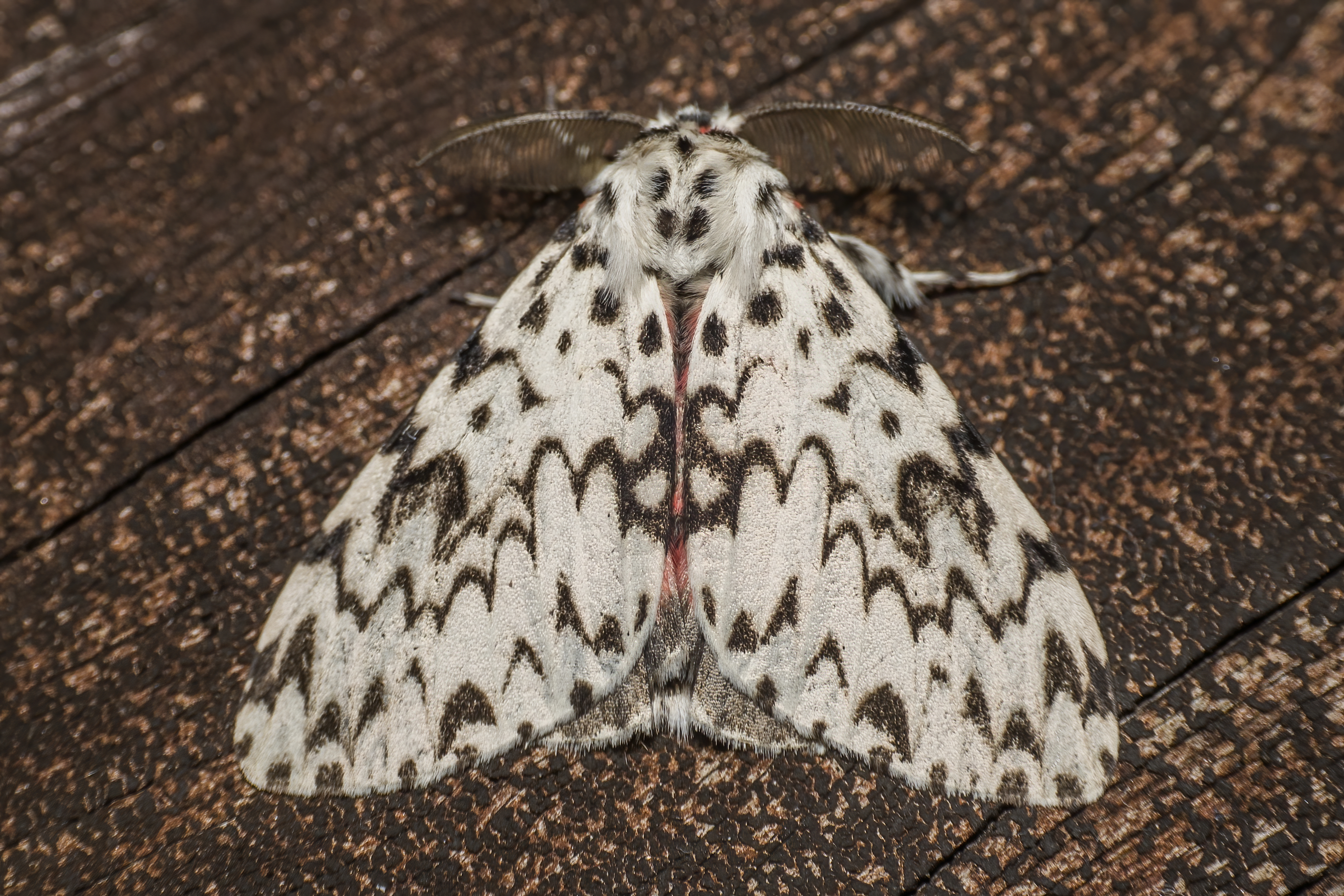
- male
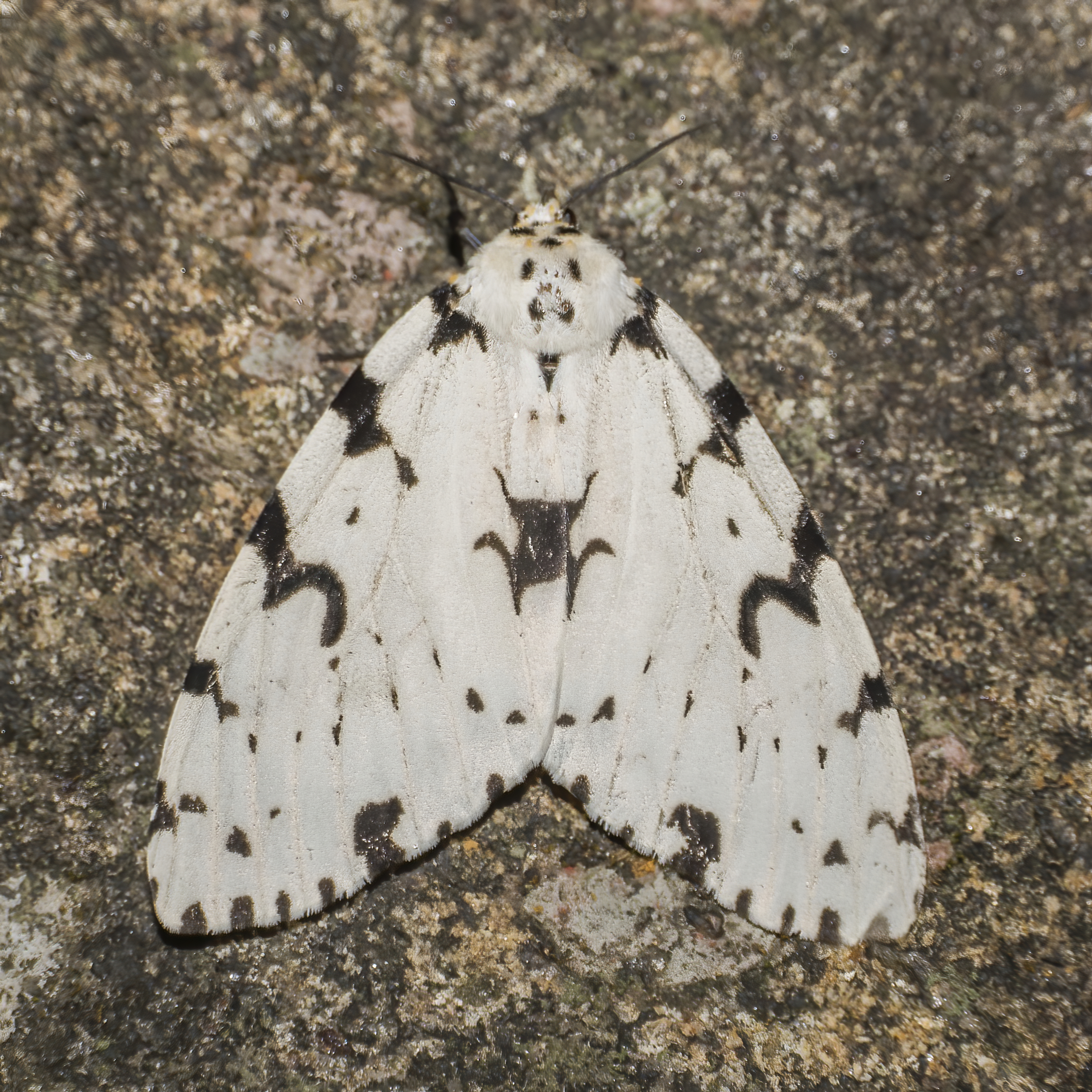
- female both in Sinharaja Forest, Viharahena

Scientific classification
- Domain: Eukaryota
- Kingdom: Animalia
- Phylum: Arthropoda
- Class: Insecta
- Order: Lepidoptera
- Superfamily: Noctuoidea
- Family: Erebidae
- Genus: Lymantria
- Species: L. todara

Binomial name
- Lymantria todara Moore, 1879

Synonyms
- Liparis todara C. Swinhoe, 1923

= Lymantria todara =

Species of moth

Lymantria todara is a moth of the family Erebidae first described by Frederic Moore in 1879. It is found in India (Nilgiri) and Sri Lanka.

The caterpillar is a pest of Lagerstroemia parviflora, Shorea robusta, Terminalia bellirica and Terminalia tomentosa.
