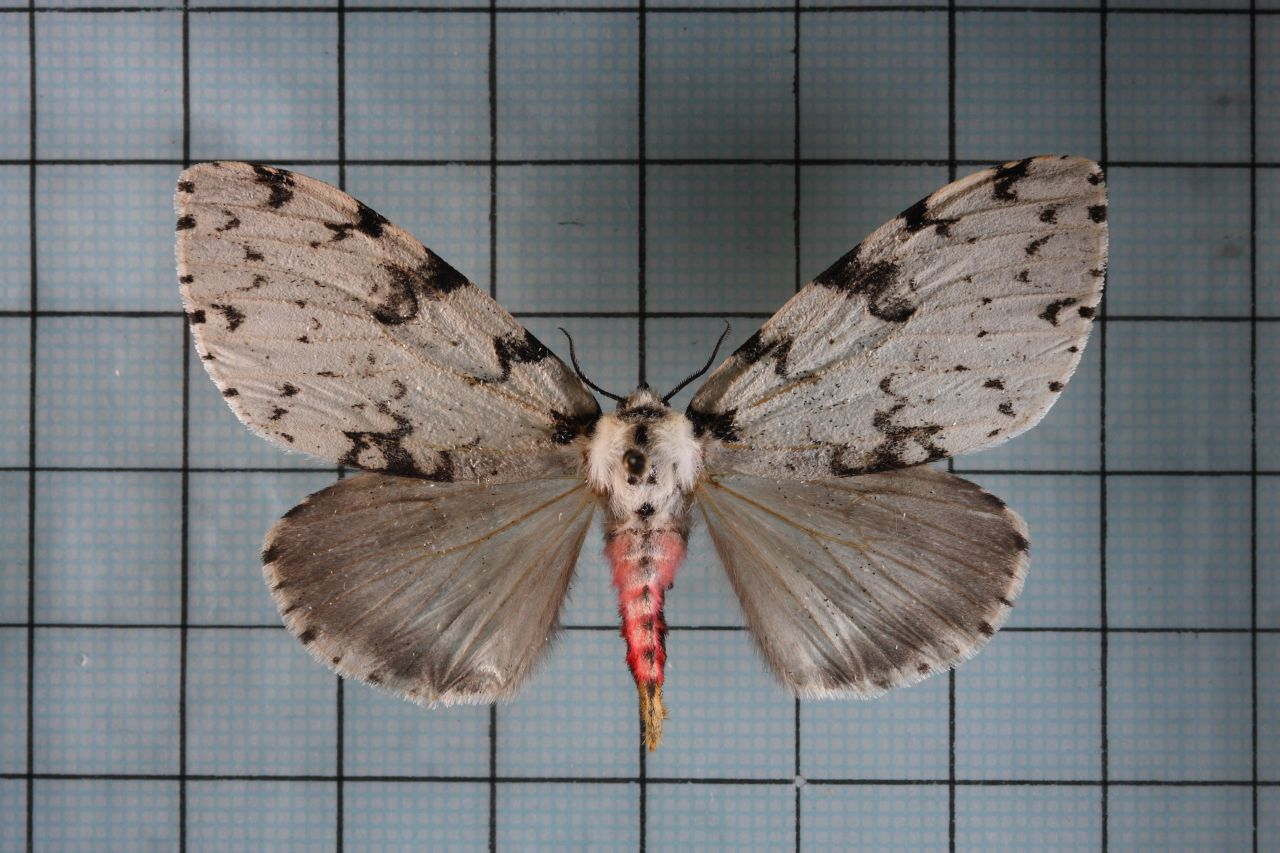

Scientific classification
- Domain: Eukaryota
- Kingdom: Animalia
- Phylum: Arthropoda
- Class: Insecta
- Order: Lepidoptera
- Superfamily: Noctuoidea
- Family: Erebidae
- Genus: Lymantria
- Species: L. sugii

Binomial name
- Lymantria sugii (Kishida, 1986)

Synonyms
- Lymantria minomonis sugii

= Lymantria sugii =

Species of moth

Lymantria sugii is a moth in the family Erebidae. It is found in Taiwan.
