= Lymantica polycyma =

Scientific classification
- Domain: Eukaryota
- Kingdom: Animalia
- Phylum: Arthropoda
- Class: Insecta
- Order: Lepidoptera
- Superfamily: Noctuoidea
- Family: Erebidae
- Genus: Lymantica
- Species: L. polycyma

Binomial name
- Lymantica polycyma Collenette, 1936

Synonyms
- Lymantria polycyma Colette, 1936

Species of moth

Lymantica polycyma is a moth of the family Erebidae. It is found in eastern Madagascar.

This species looks similar to Lymantica malgassica (Kenrick, 1914) but smaller, with shorter antennae and no trace of pink in the body, wings and legs and with very distinctive genitalia.

The length of the males is 31–36 mm (1.2–1.4 in) and of the females 39–47 mm (1.5–1.9 in).
