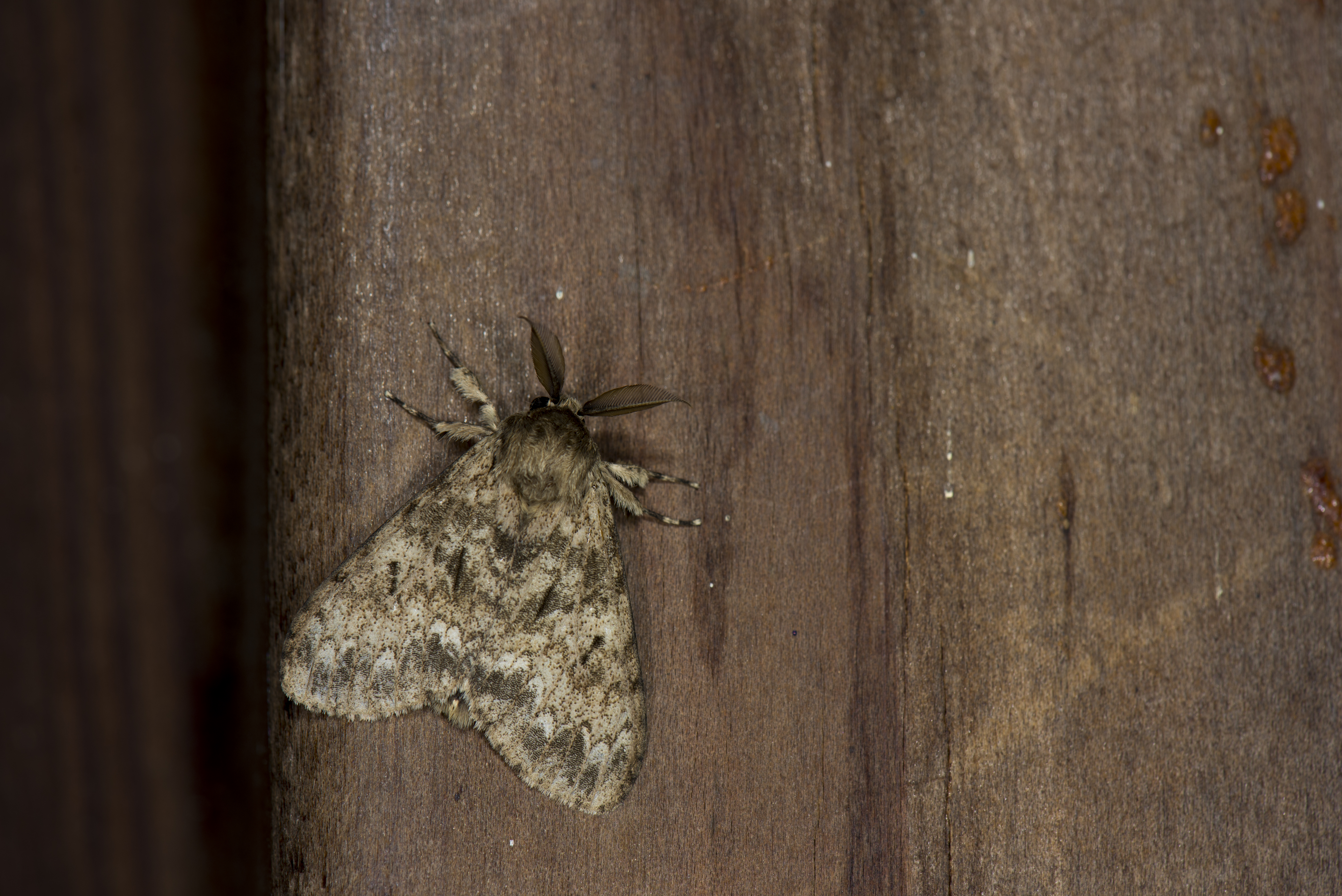

Scientific classification
- Domain: Eukaryota
- Kingdom: Animalia
- Phylum: Arthropoda
- Class: Insecta
- Order: Lepidoptera
- Superfamily: Noctuoidea
- Family: Erebidae
- Genus: Lymantria
- Species: L. iris

Binomial name
- Lymantria iris Strand, 1910

= Lymantria iris =

Species of moth

Lymantria iris is a species of erebid moth described by Embrik Strand in 1910. It is found in Taiwan.
