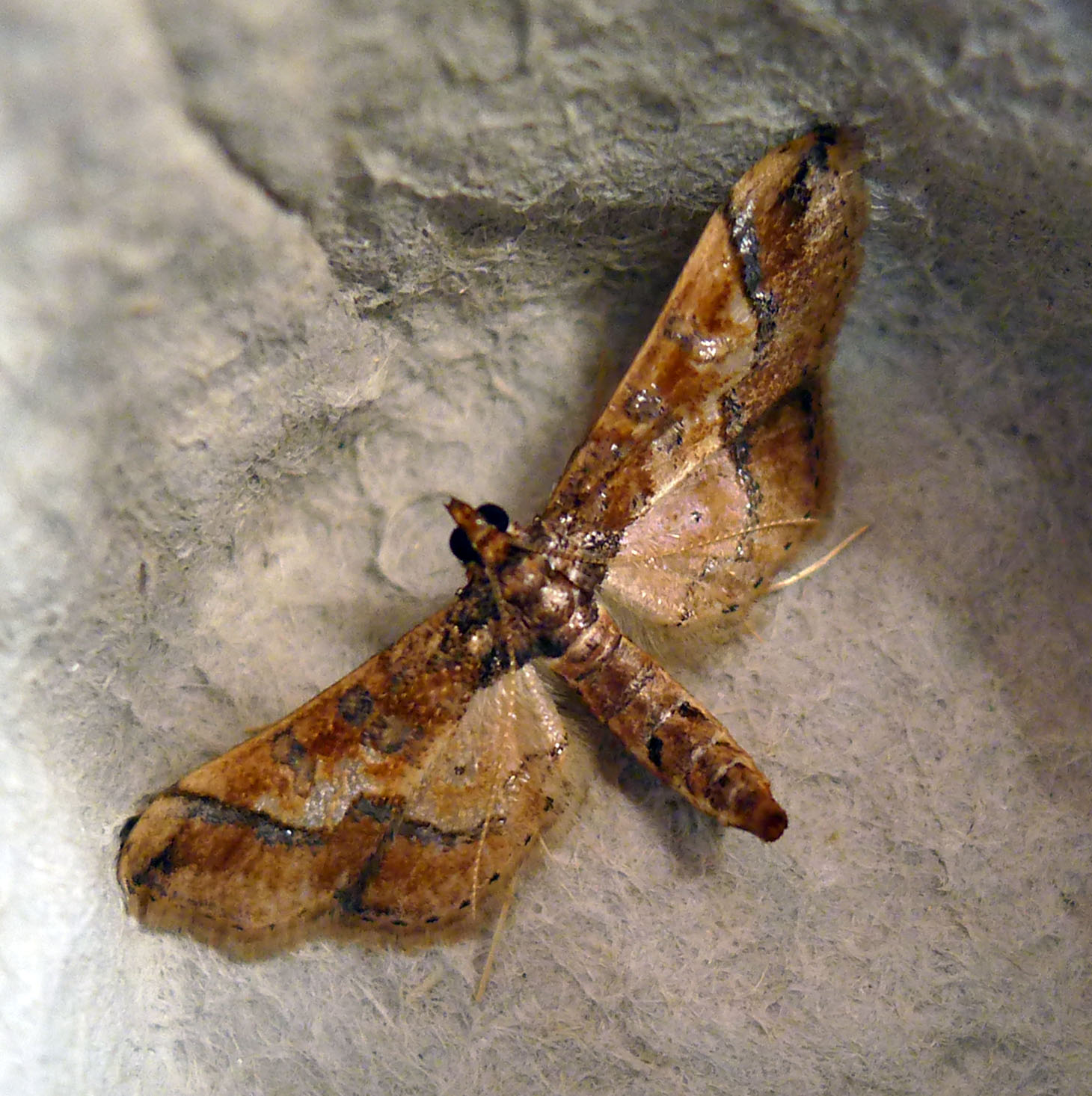
- Hydriris ornatalis, adult

Scientific classification
- Kingdom: Animalia
- Phylum: Arthropoda
- Clade: Pancrustacea
- Class: Insecta
- Order: Lepidoptera
- Family: Crambidae
- Subfamily: Spilomelinae
- Tribe: Hydririni; Minet, 1982

Genera
- Choristostigma; Gonocausta; Hydriris; Lamprosema; Nehydriris; Ommatospila; Rhectothyris; Syllepis

= Hydririni =

Tribe of moths

Hydririni is a tribe of the species-rich subfamily Spilomelinae in the pyraloid moth family Crambidae.

== Description ==
Adult Hydririni are narrow- to broad-winged moths. Many species exhibit an inconspicuous wing pattern of brown and ochre colours, whereas species like Choristostigma roseopennalis (Hulst, 1886) can be rather colourful.

The tribe is characterised by two synapomorphies: the female genitalia have an appendix bursae on the corpus bursae (as found in Pyraustinae), and the male genitalia of most Hydririni exhibit one or more hair scale patches on the central anterior edge of the abdominal sternite 8. Apart from this, the morphology of the genitalia is rather heterogeneous: in the male genitalia, the valves are slender to broad, and the uncus and gnathos range from well-developed to reduced. The genera Choristostigma, Hydriris, Nehydriris and Rhectothyris have lobar processes with a field of long, thin hair-pencils on the dorsolateral tegumen as well as a phallus with a long caecum and a straight or hooked cornutus.

In the female genitalia, two general types of signa are observed in the corpus bursae: the "ediacaroid" signum (sensu Mally et al. 2019) has the transverse axis more or less reduced, and the signum is elongate and zipper-shaped to nearly circular; the second type is formed by a circle of radiating spines. In Ommatospila, both signum types occur together.

Hydririni are one of the four tribes that form the paraphyletic "non-euspilomeline" group, with the "euspilomeline" clade nested within. The "non-euspilomeline" tribes are characterised by plesiomorphic characters shared with the sister group of Spilomelinae, the Pyraustinae. These plesiomorphic characters include the absence of a longitudinal sclerotized strip on the pleural membranes of the male abdominal segment 8, a straight or concave costa of the valves and an evenly sclerotized phallus apodeme in the male genitalia, as well as the "ediacaroid" signum and an appendix bursae in the female genitalia.

The morphology and chaetotaxy of Hydririni larvae has not been scientifically described.

== Food plants ==
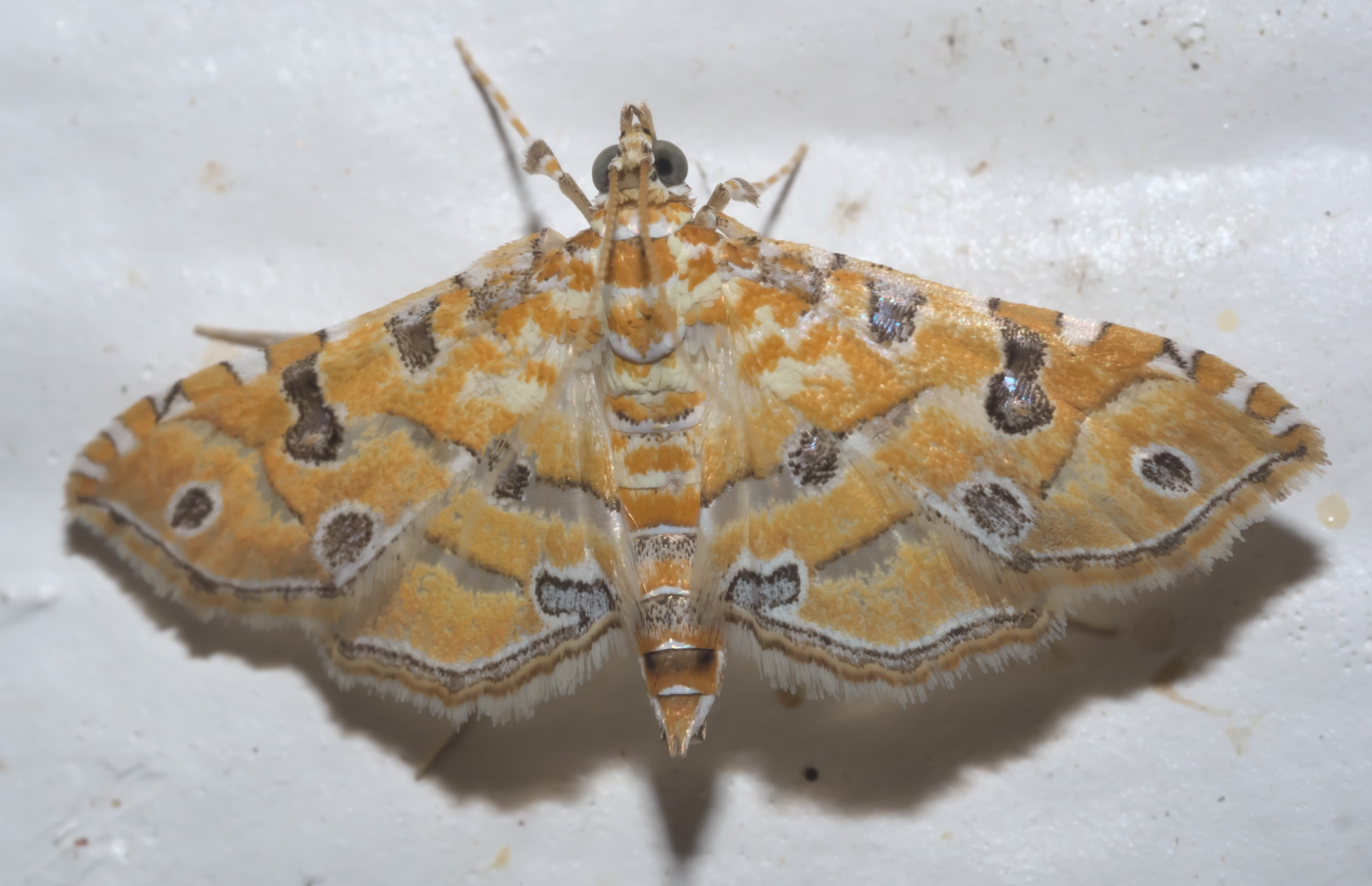
Ommatospila narcaeusalis, adult

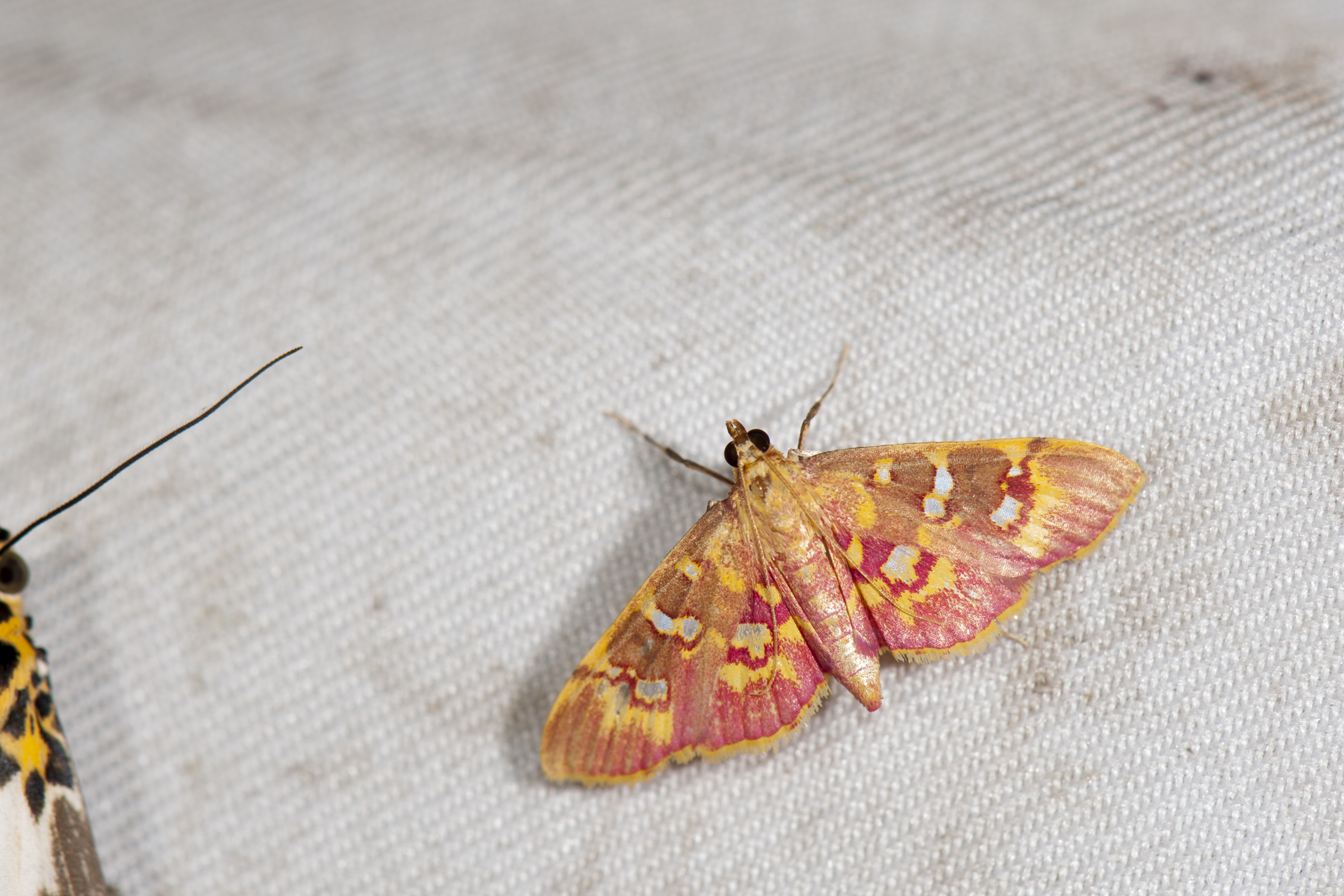
Rhectothyris gratiosalis, adult

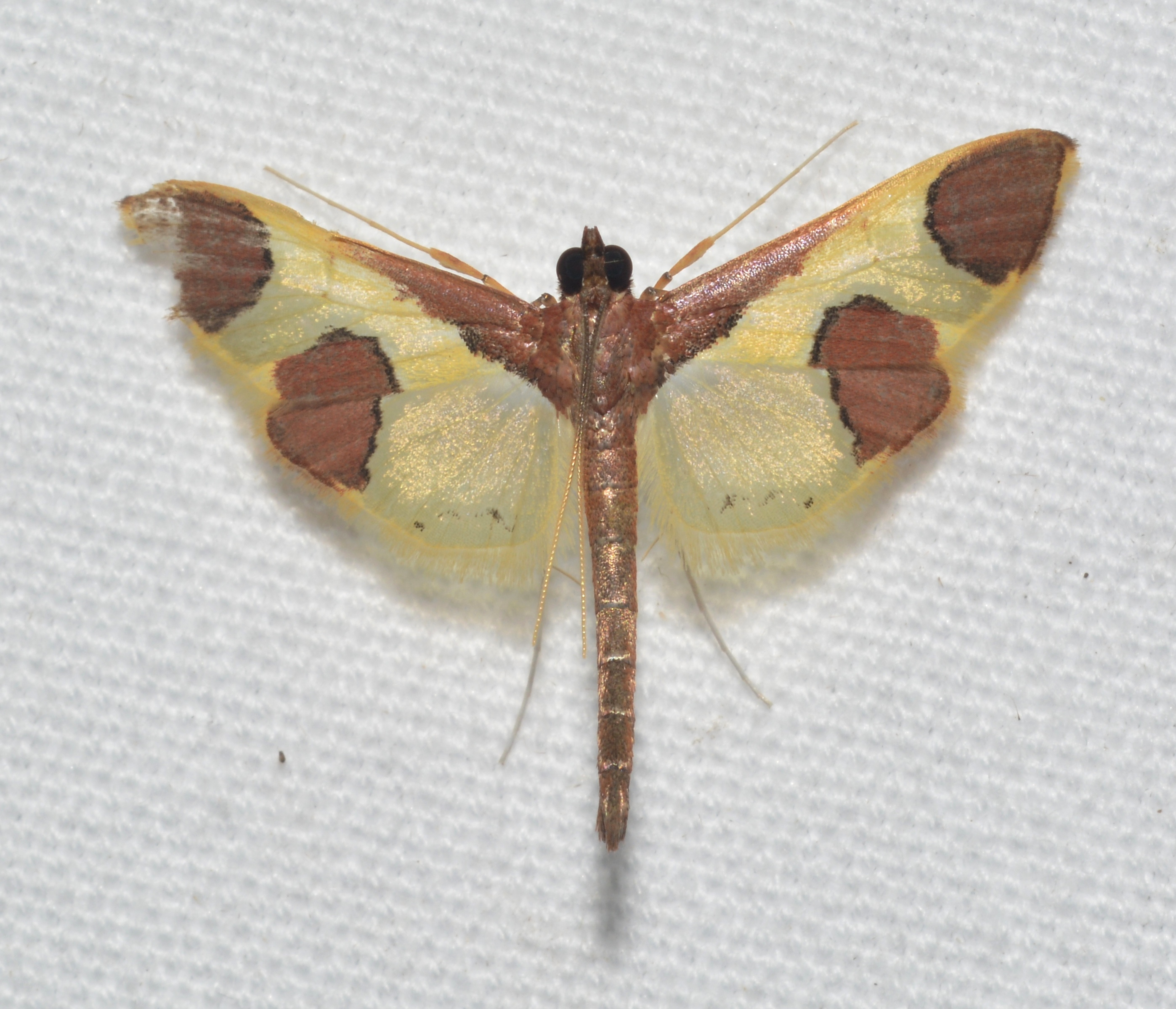
Syllepis hortalis, adult

Recorded food plants of Hydririni larvae are predominantly Sapindaceae: Allophylus psilospermus, A. racemosus, Paullinia bracteosa, P. costaricensis, P. faginea, P. fuscescens, P. grandifolia, P. turbacensis, Serjania atrolineata, S. mexicana, S. rhombea, S. schiedeana, S. valerioi, and Urvilea ulmacea. A single case of feeding on the Fabaceae, Senna obtusifolia is recorded for a Costa Rican specimen of Lamprosema, and the young larvae of Hydriris ornatalis feed on the leaf undersides of Ipomoea batatas (Convolvulaceae) and related plants, whereas older larval instars skeletonize the leaves.

== Distribution ==
Hydririni in its current composition contains mostly American taxa, with the majority of them described from tropical Central and South America. Lamprosema contains many Old World species that are misplaced in this genus.

== Systematics ==
The tribe Hydririni was proposed in 1982 by Joël Minet, who originally placed it in the crambid subfamily Glaphyriinae. Minet included only the type genus Hydriris. Minet's original placement of the tribe in Glaphyriinae is likely due to homplastic characters shared by both groups, like the spatulate scales of the hindwings and the spinose signa in the corpus bursae of the female genitalia.

A phylogenetic study based on gene sequences and morphological data found the sampled specimens of Hydriris, Gonocausta, Lamprosema and Syllepis to form a monophyletic group that is the sister group to all other Spilomelinae investigated in that study. Based on morphological congruities, the authors placed four additional genera in this tribe, so that altogether eight genera, comprising 104 species, are currently placed in Hydririni:

- Choristostigma Warren, 1892 (synonym Namangania Amsel, 1952)
- Gonocausta Lederer, 1863
- Hydriris Meyrick, 1885 (synonyms Antiercta Amsel, 1956, Hyperectis Meyrick, 1904, Spanista Lederer, 1863)
- Lamprosema Hübner, 1823 (misspelling Lamphosema Schaus, 1940)
- Nehydriris Munroe, 1974
- Ommatospila Lederer, 1863 (synonym Thelda Walker, 1866)
- Rhectothyris Warren, 1890
- Syllepis Poey, 1832
