= List of crambid genera: R =

The large moth family Crambidae contains the following genera beginning with "R":

- Radessa
- Ramila
- Raphiptera
- Rapoona
- Ravanoa
- Rehimena
- Reskovitsia
- Rhagoba
- Rhectocraspeda
- Rhectosemia
- Rhectothyris
- Rhimphalea
- Rhimphaliodes
- Rhodocantha
- Rhynchetria
- Rinecera
- Rodaba
- Roxita
- Rupela
