= Choristostigma disputalis =

Scientific classification
- Kingdom: Animalia
- Phylum: Arthropoda
- Class: Insecta
- Order: Lepidoptera
- Family: Crambidae
- Genus: Choristostigma
- Species: C. disputalis

Binomial name
- Choristostigma disputalis (Barnes & McDunnough, 1917)

Synonyms
- Diasemia disputalis Barnes & McDunnough, 1917

Species of moth

Choristostigma disputalis is a moth in the family Crambidae. It was described by William Barnes and James Halliday McDunnough in 1917. It is found in North America, where it has been recorded from Alberta, Arizona, British Columbia, California and Oregon.

The wingspan is about 20 mm. Adults are very similar to Choristostigma elegantalis, but the ground colour of the forewings is paler, the orbicular and reniform spots filled with rather shiny whitish and the latter smaller and much more constricted centrally, being almost divided into two equal triangular spots. There is a faint silvery band in the costal portion of the wing and a broader bluish patch between the bend and the inner margin. The hindwings are paler than in C. elegantalis with only faint, smoky suffusion outwardly and an obsolescent postmedian line. Adults have been recorded on wing from April to August.
