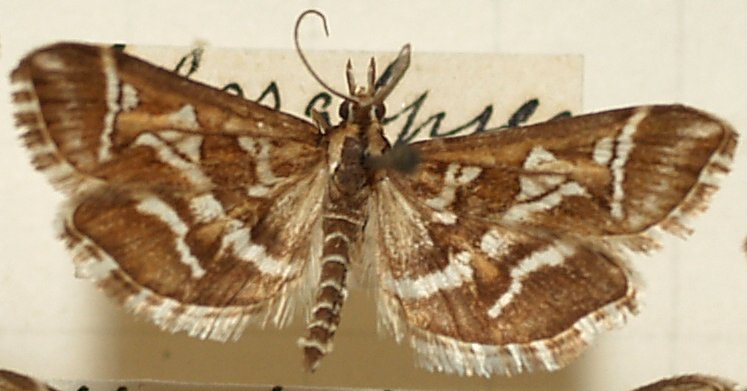
- Adult specimen of D. reticularis

Scientific classification
- Kingdom: Animalia
- Phylum: Arthropoda
- Clade: Pancrustacea
- Class: Insecta
- Order: Lepidoptera
- Family: Crambidae
- Subfamily: Spilomelinae
- Genus: Diasemia; Hübner, [1825]

= Diasemia =

Genus of moths

Diasemia is a genus of moths in the family Crambidae.

== Species ==
- Diasemia accalis (Walker, 1859)
- Diasemia completalis Walker, 1866
- Diasemia disjectalis (Zeller, 1852)
- Diasemia grammalis Doubleday in White and Doubleday, 1843
- Diasemia impulsalis (Walker, 1859)
- Diasemia lepidoneuralis Strand, 1918
- Diasemia lunalis Gaede, 1916
- Diasemia monostigma Hampson, 1913
- Diasemia reticularis (Linnaeus, 1761)
- Diasemia trigonialis Hampson, 1913
- Diasemia zebralis Maes, 2011

== Former species ==
- Diasemia erubescens Hampson, 1899

== Synonyms ==
Junior synonyms of Diasemia are:

- Diasema (lapsus)
- Goniogramma Mann, 1854
- Prodelia Doubleday, [1849]
