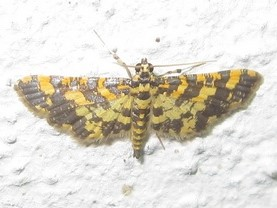
- Eurrhyparodes tricoloralis

Scientific classification
- Kingdom: Animalia
- Phylum: Arthropoda
- Class: Insecta
- Order: Lepidoptera
- Family: Crambidae
- Tribe: Herpetogrammatini
- Genus: Eurrhyparodes; Snellen, 1880

Synonyms
- Molybdantha Meyrick, 1884

= Eurrhyparodes =

Genus of moths

Eurrhyparodes is a genus of moths in the family Crambidae.

== Species ==
- Eurrhyparodes bracteolalis (Zeller, 1852)
- Eurrhyparodes calis Druce, 1902
- Eurrhyparodes diffracta Meyrick, 1936
- Eurrhyparodes leechi South in Leech & South, 1901
- Eurrhyparodes lygdamis Druce, 1902
- Eurrhyparodes multilinea Bethune-Baker, 1906
- Eurrhyparodes nymphulalis Strand, 1918
- Eurrhyparodes plumbeimarginalis Hampson, 1898
- Eurrhyparodes sculdus Dyar, 1914
- Eurrhyparodes splendens Druce, 1895
- Eurrhyparodes syllepidia Hampson, 1898
- Eurrhyparodes tricoloralis (Zeller, 1852)

== Former species ==
- Eurrhyparodes voralis Schaus, 1920 transferred to Gonocausta voralis (Schaus, 1920)
