= Diasemia zebralis =

Scientific classification
- Kingdom: Animalia
- Phylum: Arthropoda
- Class: Insecta
- Order: Lepidoptera
- Family: Crambidae
- Genus: Diasemia
- Species: D. zebralis

Binomial name
- Diasemia zebralis Maes, 2011

Species of moth

Diasemia zebralis is a moth in the family Crambidae. It was described by Koen V. N. Maes in 2011. It is found in the Democratic Republic of the Congo.
