= Eurrhyparodes plumbeimarginalis =

Scientific classification
- Kingdom: Animalia
- Phylum: Arthropoda
- Class: Insecta
- Order: Lepidoptera
- Family: Crambidae
- Genus: Eurrhyparodes
- Species: E. plumbeimarginalis

Binomial name
- Eurrhyparodes plumbeimarginalis Hampson, 1898

Species of moth

Eurrhyparodes plumbeimarginalis is a species of moth in the family Crambidae. It was described by George Hampson in 1898. It is found in Meghalaya, India.
