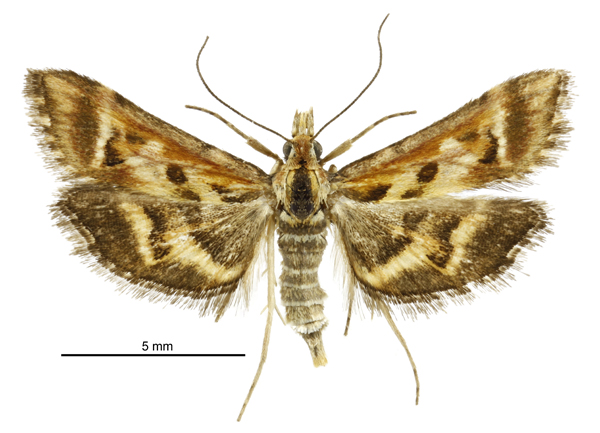
- Female
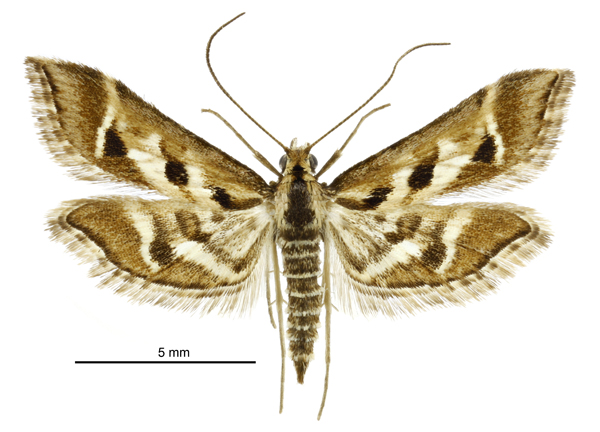
- Male

Scientific classification
- Kingdom: Animalia
- Phylum: Arthropoda
- Clade: Pancrustacea
- Class: Insecta
- Order: Lepidoptera
- Family: Crambidae
- Genus: Diasemia
- Species: D. grammalis

Binomial name
- Diasemia grammalis Doubleday, 1843

= Diasemia grammalis =

Species of moth endemic to New Zealand

Diasemia grammalis, also known as the Arrowhead, is a moth of the family Crambidae. It is likely endemic to New Zealand and has been observed in both the North and South Islands. The species inhabits open dry herb field areas. Adults are day flying and are on the wing most commonly from October until March. Larvae feed on the ground the roots of native grasses and shrubs including Muehlenbeckia axillaris.

== Taxonomy ==
This species was first described by Edward Doubleday in the book Travels in New Zealand using a specimen collected by A. Sinclair in Auckland. The male holotype specimen is held at the Natural History Museum, London.

== Description ==
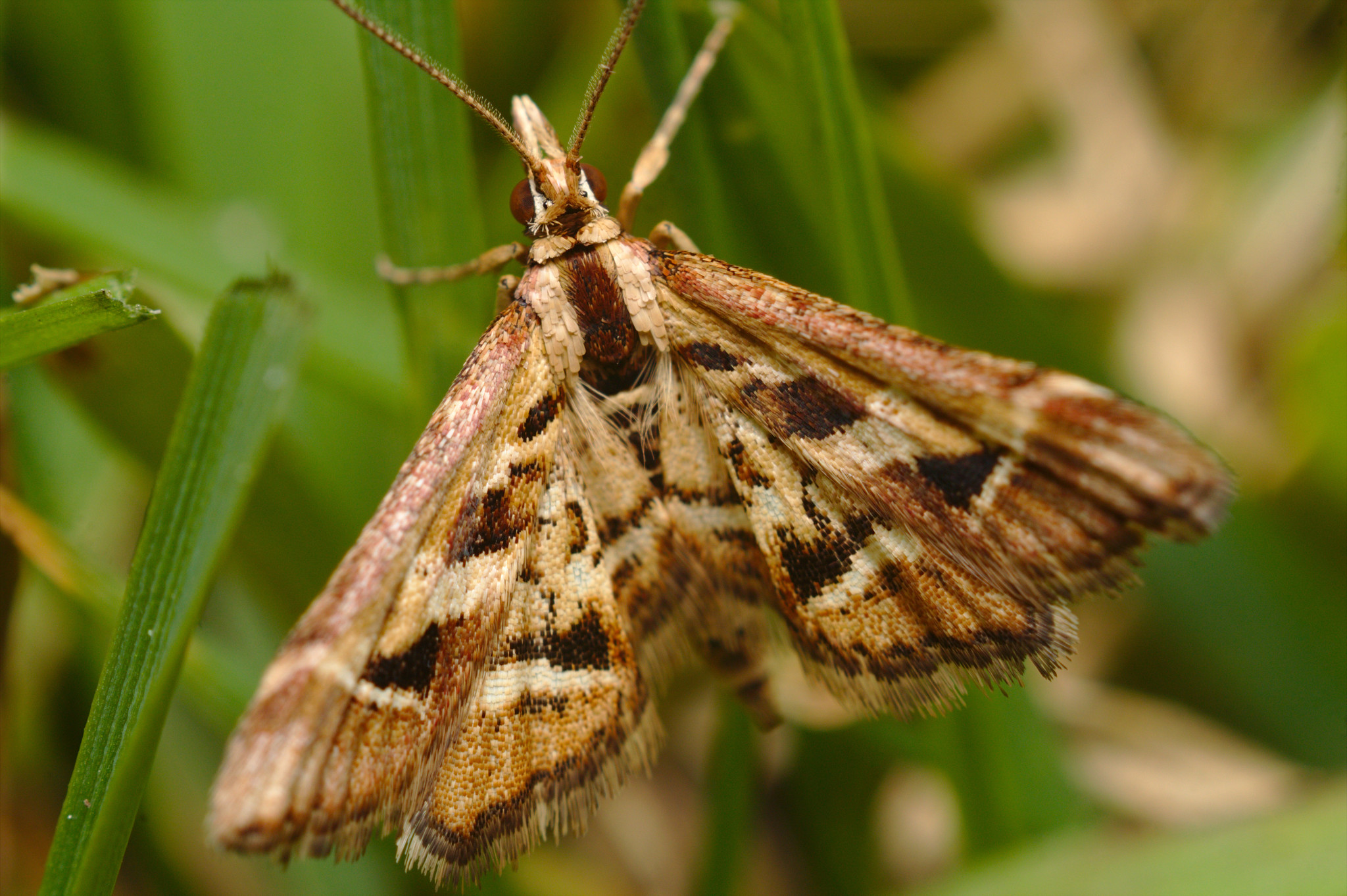

George Hudson described this species as follows:

The expansion of the wings is from 1/2 to 5/8 inch. The forewings, which have the termen very oblique, are dull brown; the dorsal and central area is cream-colour to about 2/3 there, are three short thick black bars on the dorsum and a straight oblique white: line from the costa at about 3/4 not quite reaching the dorsum. The hind-wings are dull-brown with two black-edged whitish bars.

Adults can be variable in the depth of ground colour on their wings as well as the extent of the white markings, which in some specimens can become dominant.

== Distribution ==
This species is endemic to New Zealand. It is found both in the North and South Islands.

== Behaviour ==
Adults are fast flying and diurnal. They are commonly seen on the wing from October until March. Adults are also attracted to light and have been captured with light traps.

== Habitat and hosts ==
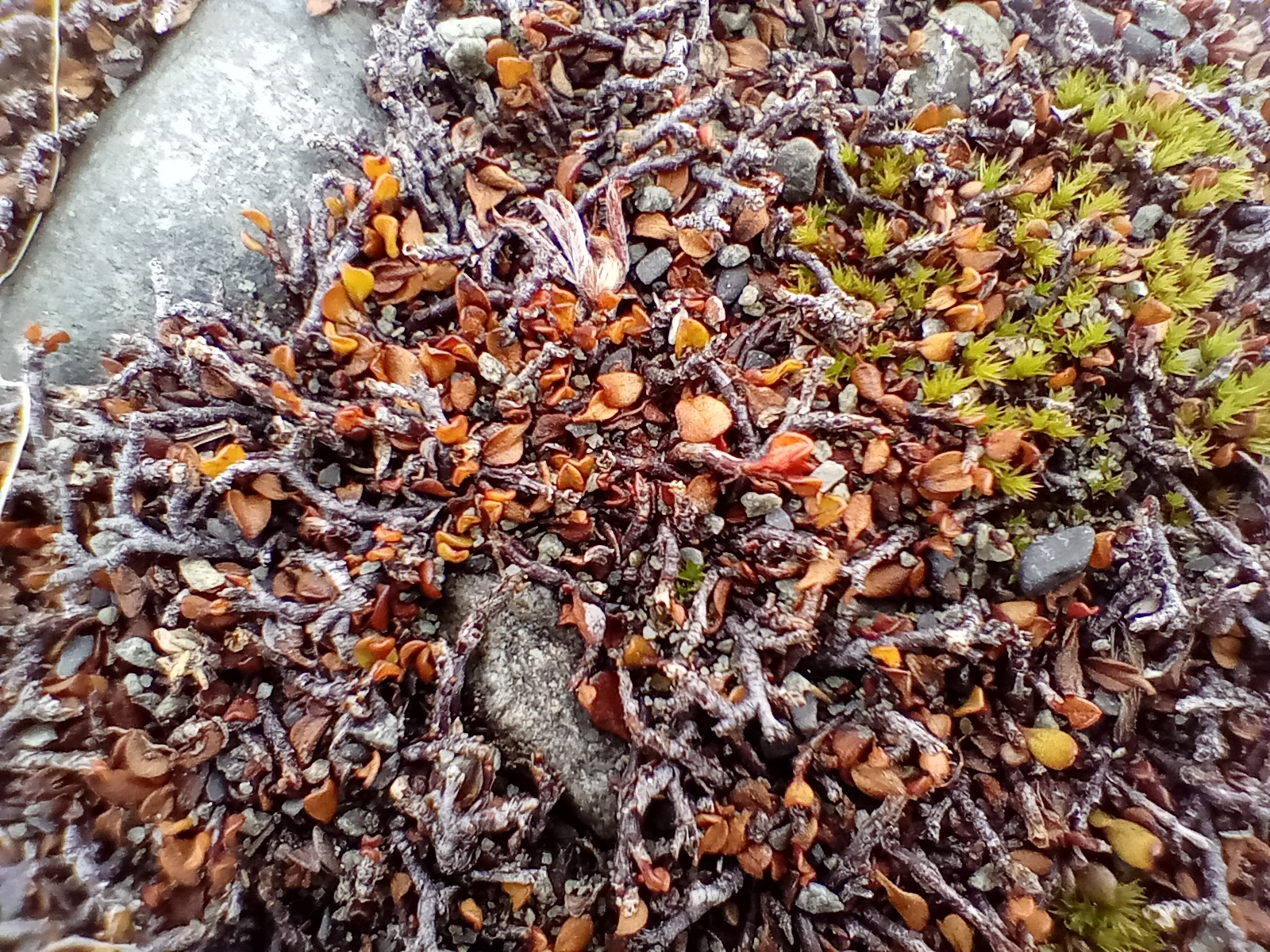
Muehlenbeckia axillaris and roots

This species inhabits open dry herb field areas from the coast up to altitudes of around 1000m. The larvae feed on the ground amongst leaf-litter on the roots of native grasses and herbaceous plants including Muehlenbeckia axillaris.
