= Eurrhyparodes calis =

Scientific classification
- Kingdom: Animalia
- Phylum: Arthropoda
- Class: Insecta
- Order: Lepidoptera
- Family: Crambidae
- Genus: Eurrhyparodes
- Species: E. calis

Binomial name
- Eurrhyparodes calis H. Druce, 1902

Species of moth

Eurrhyparodes calis is a species of moth in the family Crambidae. It was described by Herbert Druce in 1902. It is found in Colombia.
