= Ischnurges inusitata =

Scientific classification
- Domain: Eukaryota
- Kingdom: Animalia
- Phylum: Arthropoda
- Class: Insecta
- Order: Lepidoptera
- Family: Crambidae
- Genus: Ischnurges
- Species: I. inusitata

Binomial name
- Ischnurges inusitata Gaede, 1916

Species of moth

Ischnurges inusitata is a moth in the family Crambidae. It was described by Max Gaede in 1916. It is found in Cameroon.
