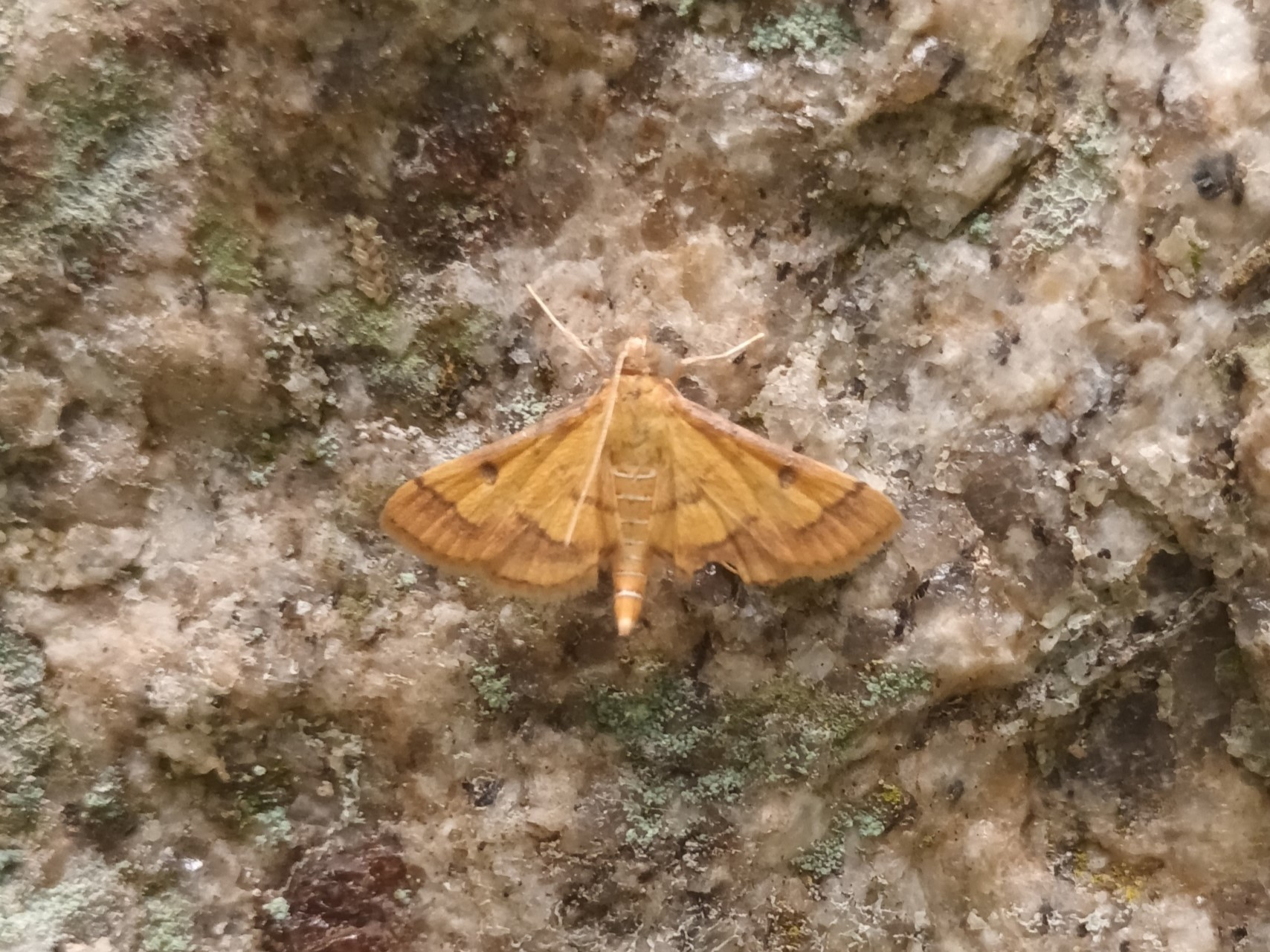

Scientific classification
- Kingdom: Animalia
- Phylum: Arthropoda
- Class: Insecta
- Order: Lepidoptera
- Family: Crambidae
- Genus: Ischnurges
- Species: I. luteomarginalis

Binomial name
- Ischnurges luteomarginalis (Hampson, 1891)

Synonyms
- Phlyctaenia luteomarginalis Hampson, 1891

= Ischnurges luteomarginalis =

Species of moth

Ischnurges luteomarginalis is a moth in the family Crambidae. It was described by George Hampson in 1891. It is found in the Nilgiris District of India.
