= Rodaba angulipennis =

Scientific classification
- Domain: Eukaryota
- Kingdom: Animalia
- Phylum: Arthropoda
- Class: Insecta
- Order: Lepidoptera
- Family: Crambidae
- Genus: Rodaba
- Species: R. angulipennis

Binomial name
- Rodaba angulipennis Moore, 1888

Species of moth

Rodaba angulipennis is a moth in the family Crambidae. It was described by Frederic Moore in 1888. It is found in Darjeeling, India.
