= Diasemia trigonialis =

Scientific classification
- Kingdom: Animalia
- Phylum: Arthropoda
- Class: Insecta
- Order: Lepidoptera
- Family: Crambidae
- Genus: Diasemia
- Species: D. trigonialis

Binomial name
- Diasemia trigonialis Hampson, 1913

Species of moth

Diasemia trigonialis is a moth in the family Crambidae. It was described by George Hampson in 1913. It is found in Lesotho and South Africa.
