= Gonocausta sabinalis =

Scientific classification
- Kingdom: Animalia
- Phylum: Arthropoda
- Clade: Pancrustacea
- Class: Insecta
- Order: Lepidoptera
- Family: Crambidae
- Genus: Gonocausta
- Species: G. sabinalis

Binomial name
- Gonocausta sabinalis Dyar, 1914

Species of moth

Gonocausta sabinalis is a moth in the family Crambidae. It is found in North America, where it has been recorded from Florida and Texas.

The wingspan is about 14 mm. Adults have been recorded on wing in April and from August to October.
