= Diasemia lunalis =

Scientific classification
- Kingdom: Animalia
- Phylum: Arthropoda
- Class: Insecta
- Order: Lepidoptera
- Family: Crambidae
- Genus: Diasemia
- Species: D. lunalis

Binomial name
- Diasemia lunalis Gaede, 1916

Synonyms
- Diasemia oressarcha E. L. Martin, 1956; Diasemia cressarcha E. L. Martin, 1956

Species of moth

Diasemia lunalis is a moth in the family Crambidae. It was described by Max Gaede in 1916. It is found in Burundi, Cameroon, Kenya, South Africa, Togo and Uganda.
