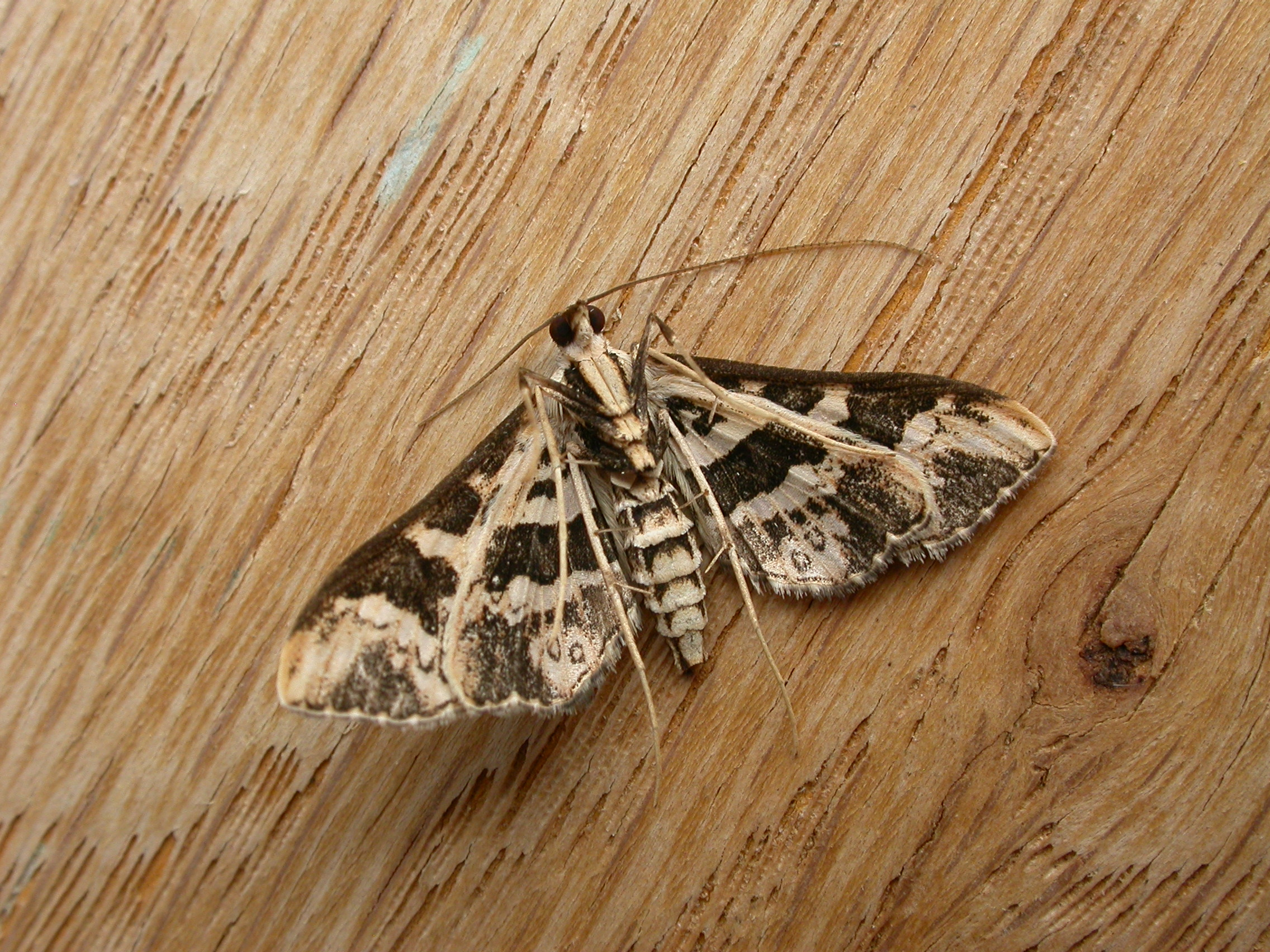
- Ischnurges illustralis

Scientific classification
- Kingdom: Animalia
- Phylum: Arthropoda
- Clade: Pancrustacea
- Class: Insecta
- Order: Lepidoptera
- Family: Crambidae
- Subfamily: Spilomelinae
- Genus: Ischnurges; Lederer, 1863

Synonyms
- Nesolocha Meyrick, 1886

= Ischnurges =

Genus of moths

Ischnurges is a genus of moths of the family Crambidae.

== Species ==
- Ischnurges bagoasalis Druce, 1899
- Ischnurges gratiosalis (Walker, 1859)
- Ischnurges illustralis Lederer, 1863
- Ischnurges inusitata Gaede, 1916
- Ischnurges luteomarginalis (Hampson, 1891)
- Ischnurges rhodographalis Hampson, 1913

== Former species ==
- Ischnurges lancinalis (Guenée, 1854)
