= Ischnurges rhodographalis =

Scientific classification
- Kingdom: Animalia
- Phylum: Arthropoda
- Clade: Pancrustacea
- Class: Insecta
- Order: Lepidoptera
- Family: Crambidae
- Genus: Ischnurges
- Species: I. rhodographalis

Binomial name
- Ischnurges rhodographalis Hampson, 1913

Species of moth

Ischnurges rhodographalis is a moth in the family Crambidae. It was described by George Hampson in 1913. It is found in Kenya and South Africa.
