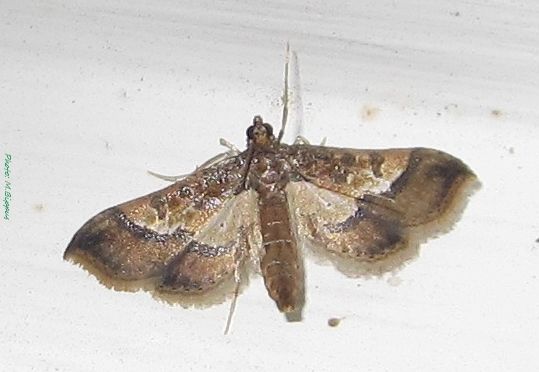

Scientific classification
- Kingdom: Animalia
- Phylum: Arthropoda
- Class: Insecta
- Order: Lepidoptera
- Family: Crambidae
- Tribe: Hydririni
- Genus: Hydriris; Meyrick, 1885

Synonyms
- Antiercta Amsel, 1956; Spanista Lederer, 1863

= Hydriris =

Genus of moths

Hydriris is a genus of pyraloid moths in the tribe Hydririni of the subfamily Spilomelinae.

== Species ==
- Hydriris angustalis Snellen, 1895
- Hydriris aonisalis (Walker, 1859)
- Hydriris bornealis (C. Felder, R. Felder & Rogenhofer, 1875)
- Hydriris chalybitis Meyrick, 1885
- Hydriris ornatalis (Duponchel, 1832)
