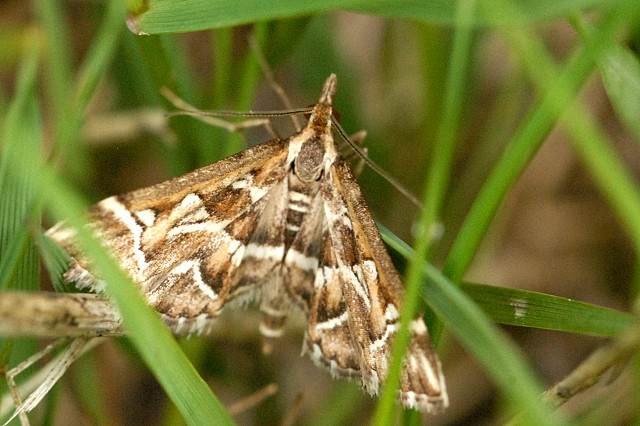
- Adult in Commanster, Belgian Ardennes, in June

Scientific classification
- Kingdom: Animalia
- Phylum: Arthropoda
- Class: Insecta
- Order: Lepidoptera
- Family: Crambidae
- Genus: Diasemia
- Species: D. reticularis

Binomial name
- Diasemia reticularis (Linnaeus, 1761)

Synonyms
- Phalaena Pyralis reticularis Linnaeus, 1761; Diasema litterata (lapsus); Diasemia litterata (Scopoli, 1763); Phalaena argentalis Fabricius, 1781; Phalaena litterata Scopoli, 1763; Phalaena literata (Heinemann, 1865); Phalaena litteralis (Duponchel, 1831-1834); Pyralis literalis Denis & Schiffermüller, 1775

= Diasemia reticularis =

Species of moth

Diasemia reticularis is a species of moth of the family Crambidae. It is typically found in the tropics, but may range into Europe as far north as the North Sea region because of its migratory nature.

The wingspan is 18–22 mm. The adults can be encountered all year if considering the species' entire range, but in subtropical and temperate regions they are rare outside the warm months.

The larvae feed mainly on Cichorieae, such as Cichorium (chicories), Hieracium (hawkweeds) and Picris (oxtongues), but also on Plantago (plantain herbs). More unusually, they have been recorded to feed on plant refuse and dry leaves.

As a result of its distinctive coloration and wing pattern the moth is occasionally referred to in France as chocolat marbré, or marbled chocolate moth.
