= Rhectocraspeda periusalis =

Scientific classification
- Kingdom: Animalia
- Phylum: Arthropoda
- Class: Insecta
- Order: Lepidoptera
- Family: Crambidae
- Genus: Rhectocraspeda
- Species: R. periusalis

Binomial name
- Rhectocraspeda periusalis (Walker, 1859)

Synonyms
- Botys periusalis Walker, 1859; Pilemia periusalis; Rhectocraspeda perfusalis; Pilemia deformalis Möschler, 1882; Rapoona tristis Hedemann, 1894

Species of moth

Rhectocraspeda periusalis, the eggplant webworm moth, is a moth in the family Crambidae. It was described by Francis Walker in 1859. It is found in the West Indies and from the United States, where it has been recorded from Florida, North Carolina, Ohio, Oklahoma, South Carolina and Tennessee, south through Mexico and Central America (including Costa Rica, Honduras and Panama) to South America, including Ecuador, Brazil, Guyana, Trinidad and Tobago and Suriname.

The length of the forewings is 8.2-9.7 mm for females and 9.5–10 mm for males. Adults are sexually dimorphic. Adults have been recorded on wing year-round.

The larvae feed on Capsicum annuum, Nicotiana tabacum, Solanum hirtum, Solanum lycopersicum, Solanum melongena, Solanum nigrum and Solanum torvum. They reach a length of about 20 mm.
