= Eurrhyparodes nymphulalis =

Scientific classification
- Kingdom: Animalia
- Phylum: Arthropoda
- Class: Insecta
- Order: Lepidoptera
- Family: Crambidae
- Genus: Eurrhyparodes
- Species: E. nymphulalis

Binomial name
- Eurrhyparodes nymphulalis Strand, 1918

Species of moth

Eurrhyparodes nymphulalis is a species of moth in the family Crambidae. It was described by Strand in 1918. It is found in Taiwan.
