= Diasemia monostigma =

Scientific classification
- Kingdom: Animalia
- Phylum: Arthropoda
- Class: Insecta
- Order: Lepidoptera
- Family: Crambidae
- Genus: Diasemia
- Species: D. monostigma

Binomial name
- Diasemia monostigma Hampson, 1913

Species of moth

Diasemia monostigma, the black wedge pyrale, is a moth of the family Crambidae. It is found in South and East Africa, including islands of the Indian Ocean.
