= Diasemia impulsalis =

Scientific classification
- Kingdom: Animalia
- Phylum: Arthropoda
- Class: Insecta
- Order: Lepidoptera
- Family: Crambidae
- Genus: Diasemia
- Species: D. impulsalis

Binomial name
- Diasemia impulsalis (Walker, 1859)

Synonyms
- Isopteryx impulsalis Walker, 1859

Species of moth

Diasemia impulsalis is a moth in the family Crambidae. It was described by Francis Walker in 1859. It is found in Sri Lanka.
