= Eurrhyparodes multilinea =

Scientific classification
- Kingdom: Animalia
- Phylum: Arthropoda
- Clade: Pancrustacea
- Class: Insecta
- Order: Lepidoptera
- Family: Crambidae
- Genus: Eurrhyparodes
- Species: E. multilinea

Binomial name
- Eurrhyparodes multilinea (Bethune-Baker, 1906)

Synonyms
- Zethes multilinea Bethune-Baker, 1906

Species of moth

Eurrhyparodes multilinea is a species of moth in the family Crambidae. It was described by George Thomas Bethune-Baker in 1906. It is found in New Guinea.

== Description ==
The wingspan is about 42 mm. The head, thorax and abdomen are sepia brown, the thorax and abdomen with a dark slaty-grey central stripe. Both wings are dark sepia brown, with all the veins palely outlined. The termen is pale slaty grey with a fine dark crenulate line.
