= Eurrhyparodes leechi =

Scientific classification
- Kingdom: Animalia
- Phylum: Arthropoda
- Class: Insecta
- Order: Lepidoptera
- Family: Crambidae
- Genus: Eurrhyparodes
- Species: E. leechi

Binomial name
- Eurrhyparodes leechi South in Leech & South, 1901

Species of moth

Eurrhyparodes leechi is a species of moth in the family Crambidae. It was described by South in 1901. It is found in China.
