= Diasemia lepidoneuralis =

Scientific classification
- Kingdom: Animalia
- Phylum: Arthropoda
- Class: Insecta
- Order: Lepidoptera
- Family: Crambidae
- Genus: Diasemia
- Species: D. lepidoneuralis

Binomial name
- Diasemia lepidoneuralis Strand, 1918

Species of moth

Diasemia lepidoneuralis is a moth in the family Crambidae. It was described by Strand in 1918. It is found in Taiwan.
