= Rhectothyris rosea =

Scientific classification
- Kingdom: Animalia
- Phylum: Arthropoda
- Class: Insecta
- Order: Lepidoptera
- Family: Crambidae
- Genus: Rhectothyris
- Species: R. rosea

Binomial name
- Rhectothyris rosea (Warren, 1896)

Synonyms
- Thysanodesma rosea Warren, 1896

Species of moth

Rhectothyris rosea is a moth in the family Crambidae. It was described by William Warren in 1896. It is found in Assam, India and Australia, where it has been recorded from Queensland.

The wingspan is about 12 mm. The wings are canary yellow with rosy markings, the forewings with the costa dotted with black brown and with a brownish blotch at the base of the costa and two brown stigmata, both very large for the size of the wing, the first oblong, the second quadrate. The two together occupying the whole of the cell. The lines are rosy and there is a broad rosy submarginal band. Below the stigmata is another rosy line.
