= Syllepis marialis =

Scientific classification
- Kingdom: Animalia
- Phylum: Arthropoda
- Class: Insecta
- Order: Lepidoptera
- Family: Crambidae
- Genus: Syllepis
- Species: S. marialis

Binomial name
- Syllepis marialis Poey, 1832

Species of moth

Syllepis marialis is a moth in the family Crambidae. It was described by Poey in 1832. It is found in Cuba, Jamaica, Puerto Rico, the Bahamas and Costa Rica.

The wingspan is 20–21 mm.
