= Choristostigma perpulchralis =

Scientific classification
- Kingdom: Animalia
- Phylum: Arthropoda
- Class: Insecta
- Order: Lepidoptera
- Family: Crambidae
- Genus: Choristostigma
- Species: C. perpulchralis

Binomial name
- Choristostigma perpulchralis (Hampson, 1899)

Synonyms
- Ischnurges perpulchralis Hampson, 1899; Ischnurges chromophila Dyar, 1914; Choristostigma chromaphila Munroe, 1983; Ischnurges microchroia Dyar, 1916

Species of moth

Choristostigma perpulchralis is a moth in the family Crambidae. It is found in Mexico (Tehuacan, Veracruz) and the United States, where it has been recorded from New Mexico and Texas.

The wingspan is 18–22 mm. The forewings are bright yellow with a bright pink costa and terminal area, as well as a pink antemedial line. The hindwings are white and the terminal area is yellowish suffused with pink scales. Adults are on wing in March, May and September.
