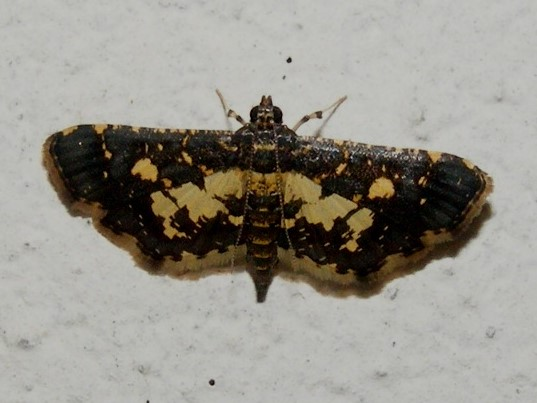

Scientific classification
- Kingdom: Animalia
- Phylum: Arthropoda
- Clade: Pancrustacea
- Class: Insecta
- Order: Lepidoptera
- Family: Crambidae
- Genus: Eurrhyparodes
- Species: E. bracteolalis

Binomial name
- Eurrhyparodes bracteolalis (Zeller, 1852)

Synonyms
- List: Botys bracteolalis Zeller, 1852; Isopteryx plumbalis Guenée, 1854; Isopteryx accessalis Walker, 1859; Eurrhyparodes stibialis Snellen, 1880; Eurrhyparodes bracteolalis var. mambarelis Strand, 1920

= Eurrhyparodes bracteolalis =

Species of moth

Eurrhyparodes bracteolalis is a species of moth in the family Crambidae.

== Distribution ==
It is found in Africa, Australia, Hong Kong, India, Indonesia, Nepal, New Guinea, Sri Lanka and Taiwan.
