= Diasemia disjectalis =

Scientific classification
- Kingdom: Animalia
- Phylum: Arthropoda
- Clade: Pancrustacea
- Class: Insecta
- Order: Lepidoptera
- Family: Crambidae
- Genus: Diasemia
- Species: D. disjectalis

Binomial name
- Diasemia disjectalis (Zeller, 1852)

Synonyms
- Pyralis disjectalis Zeller, 1852

Species of moth

Diasemia disjectalis is a species of moth in the family Crambidae. It was described by Philipp Christoph Zeller in 1852. It is found in South Africa and Zambia.
