= Choristostigma particolor =

Scientific classification
- Kingdom: Animalia
- Phylum: Arthropoda
- Class: Insecta
- Order: Lepidoptera
- Family: Crambidae
- Genus: Choristostigma
- Species: C. particolor

Binomial name
- Choristostigma particolor (Dyar, 1914)

Synonyms
- Diasemia particolor Dyar, 1914

Species of moth

Choristostigma particolor is a moth in the family Crambidae. It was described by Harrison Gray Dyar Jr. in 1914. It is found in Zacualpan, Mexico.

The wingspan is about 19 mm. The forewings are straw yellow with reddish-brown shadings at the base. The reniform is fused in a purple shade that occupies most of the area beyond the outer line and the terminal area is yellow. The outer line is red brown above, where the purple shading is incomplete. The hindwings are light yellow with a large purple cloud at the apex and smaller clouds at the tornus and following it submarginally. There is a minute discal dot, followed by a streak across the inner area. Adults have been recorded on wing in July.
