= Syllepis religiosa =

Scientific classification
- Kingdom: Animalia
- Phylum: Arthropoda
- Class: Insecta
- Order: Lepidoptera
- Family: Crambidae
- Genus: Syllepis
- Species: S. religiosa

Binomial name
- Syllepis religiosa Munroe, 1963

Species of insect

Syllepis religiosa is a moth in the family Crambidae. It was described by Eugene G. Munroe in 1963. It is found in Bolivia.
