= Ommatospila descriptalis =

Scientific classification
- Kingdom: Animalia
- Phylum: Arthropoda
- Class: Insecta
- Order: Lepidoptera
- Family: Crambidae
- Genus: Ommatospila
- Species: O. descriptalis

Binomial name
- Ommatospila descriptalis (Walker, 1866)

Synonyms
- Thelda descriptalis Walker, 1866

Species of moth

Ommatospila descriptalis is a moth in the family Crambidae. It was described by Francis Walker in 1866. It is found in the Dominican Republic.
