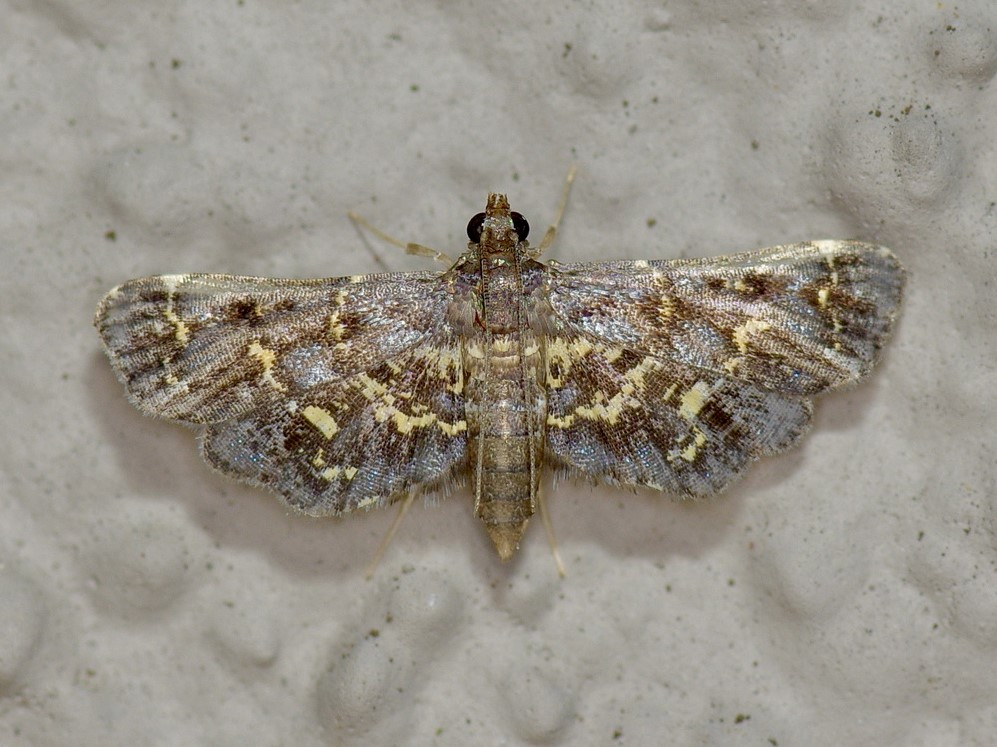

Scientific classification
- Kingdom: Animalia
- Phylum: Arthropoda
- Class: Insecta
- Order: Lepidoptera
- Family: Crambidae
- Genus: Eurrhyparodes
- Species: E. lygdamis

Binomial name
- Eurrhyparodes lygdamis H. Druce, 1902

Synonyms
- Eurrhyparodes lydanus Dyar, 1914

= Eurrhyparodes lygdamis =

Species of moth

Eurrhyparodes lygdamis is a species of moth in the family Crambidae. It was described by Herbert Druce in 1902. It is found in the United States, where it has been recorded from Florida to Texas and from Mexico to Brazil.

Adults are on wing from March to May, from August to September and from November to December in Florida.
