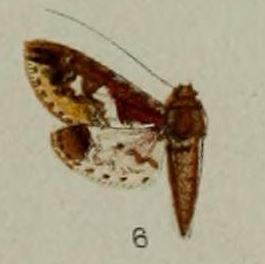

Scientific classification
- Kingdom: Animalia
- Phylum: Arthropoda
- Class: Insecta
- Order: Lepidoptera
- Family: Crambidae
- Genus: Eurrhyparodes
- Species: E. syllepidia

Binomial name
- Eurrhyparodes syllepidia Hampson, 1898

= Eurrhyparodes syllepidia =

Species of moth

Eurrhyparodes syllepidia is a species of moth in the family Crambidae. It was described by George Hampson in 1898. It is found in Mexico and Costa Rica.

== Description ==
The wingspan is about 28 mm. The forewings are brown, suffused with purplish fuscous. There is a series of white points on the costa. The hindwings are semihyaline yellow with a black base.
