= Syllepis triangulifera =

Scientific classification
- Kingdom: Animalia
- Phylum: Arthropoda
- Class: Insecta
- Order: Lepidoptera
- Family: Crambidae
- Genus: Syllepis
- Species: S. triangulifera

Binomial name
- Syllepis triangulifera Munroe, 1970

Species of moth

Syllepis triangulifera is a moth in the family Crambidae. It was described by Eugene G. Munroe in 1970. It is found in Peru.
