= Gonocausta =

Scientific classification
- Kingdom: Animalia
- Phylum: Arthropoda
- Clade: Pancrustacea
- Class: Insecta
- Order: Lepidoptera
- Family: Crambidae
- Tribe: Hydririni
- Genus: Gonocausta; Lederer, 1863

Genus of moths

Gonocausta is a genus of moths of the family Crambidae. The genus was first described by Julius Lederer in 1863.

== Species ==
- Gonocausta sabinalis Dyar, 1914
- Gonocausta simulata (Druce, 1902)
- Gonocausta vestigialis Snellen, 1890
- Gonocausta voralis (Schaus, 1920)
- Gonocausta zephyralis Lederer, 1863
