= Diasemia completalis =

Scientific classification
- Kingdom: Animalia
- Phylum: Arthropoda
- Class: Insecta
- Order: Lepidoptera
- Family: Crambidae
- Genus: Diasemia
- Species: D. completalis

Binomial name
- Diasemia completalis Walker, 1866

Species of moth

Diasemia completalis is a moth in the family Crambidae. It was described by Francis Walker in 1866. It is found in Australia.
