= Ischnurges bagoasalis =

Scientific classification
- Domain: Eukaryota
- Kingdom: Animalia
- Phylum: Arthropoda
- Class: Insecta
- Order: Lepidoptera
- Family: Crambidae
- Genus: Ischnurges
- Species: I. bagoasalis

Binomial name
- Ischnurges bagoasalis H. Druce, 1899

Species of moth

Ischnurges bagoasalis is a moth in the family Crambidae. It was described by Herbert Druce in 1899. It is found in Mexico.
