= Gonocausta simulata =

Scientific classification
- Kingdom: Animalia
- Phylum: Arthropoda
- Class: Insecta
- Order: Lepidoptera
- Family: Crambidae
- Genus: Gonocausta
- Species: G. simulata

Binomial name
- Gonocausta simulata (H. Druce, 1902)

Synonyms
- Syngamia simulata H. Druce, 1902

Species of moth

Gonocausta simulata is a moth in the family Crambidae. It was described by Herbert Druce in 1902. It is found in Loja Province, Ecuador.
