= Syllepis aurora =

Scientific classification
- Kingdom: Animalia
- Phylum: Arthropoda
- Class: Insecta
- Order: Lepidoptera
- Family: Crambidae
- Genus: Syllepis
- Species: S. aurora

Binomial name
- Syllepis aurora Munroe, 1959

Species of moth

Syllepis aurora is a moth in the family Crambidae. It was described by Eugene G. Munroe in 1959. It is found in São Paulo, Brazil.
