= Syllepis latimarginalis =

Scientific classification
- Kingdom: Animalia
- Phylum: Arthropoda
- Class: Insecta
- Order: Lepidoptera
- Family: Crambidae
- Genus: Syllepis
- Species: S. latimarginalis

Binomial name
- Syllepis latimarginalis Munroe, 1970

Species of moth

Syllepis latimarginalis is a moth in the family Crambidae. It was described by Eugene G. Munroe in 1970. It is found in Colombia.
