= Rodaba violalis =

Scientific classification
- Kingdom: Animalia
- Phylum: Arthropoda
- Class: Insecta
- Order: Lepidoptera
- Family: Crambidae
- Genus: Rodaba
- Species: R. violalis

Binomial name
- Rodaba violalis Caradja in Caradja & Meyrick, 1937

Species of moth

Rodaba violalis is a moth in the family Crambidae. It was described by Aristide Caradja in 1937. It is found in Yunnan, China.
