= Eurrhyparodes sculdus =

Scientific classification
- Kingdom: Animalia
- Phylum: Arthropoda
- Class: Insecta
- Order: Lepidoptera
- Family: Crambidae
- Genus: Eurrhyparodes
- Species: E. sculdus

Binomial name
- Eurrhyparodes sculdus Dyar 1914

Species of moth

Eurrhyparodes sculdus is a species of moth in the family Crambidae. It was described by Harrison Gray Dyar Jr. in 1914. It is found in Panama.

== Description ==
The wingspan is about 12 mm. The forewings are dark brown with a purplish lustre. The inner line is straight, dark and obscure. The outer line has two teeth, relieved by narrow straw-coloured patches before the teeth and following most of the line outwardly. The base of the hindwings is pale whitish, tinged with straw colour.
