= Hydriris bornealis =

Scientific classification
- Kingdom: Animalia
- Phylum: Arthropoda
- Class: Insecta
- Order: Lepidoptera
- Family: Crambidae
- Genus: Hydriris
- Species: H. bornealis

Binomial name
- Hydriris bornealis (C. Felder, R. Felder & Rogenhofer, 1875)

Synonyms
- Botys bornealis C. Felder, R. Felder & Rogenhofer, 1875

Species of moth

Hydriris bornealis is a moth in the family Crambidae. It is found in Borneo.
