= Choristostigma plumbosignalis =

Scientific classification
- Kingdom: Animalia
- Phylum: Arthropoda
- Class: Insecta
- Order: Lepidoptera
- Family: Crambidae
- Genus: Choristostigma
- Species: C. plumbosignalis

Binomial name
- Choristostigma plumbosignalis (Fernald, 1888)

Synonyms
- Botis plumbosignalis Fernald, 1888

Species of moth

Choristostigma plumbosignalis is a moth in the family Crambidae. It was described by Charles H. Fernald in 1888. It is found in North America, where it has been recorded from British Columbia and Alberta to Arizona and New Mexico, east to South Dakota. The habitat consists of grassland coulees, the aspen parkland, as well as wooded areas in boreal forests and mountainous areas.

The wingspan is 20–21 mm. Adults are on wing from June to August.
