= Hydriris aonisalis =

Scientific classification
- Kingdom: Animalia
- Phylum: Arthropoda
- Class: Insecta
- Order: Lepidoptera
- Family: Crambidae
- Genus: Hydriris
- Species: H. aonisalis

Binomial name
- Hydriris aonisalis (Walker, 1859)

Synonyms
- Pyralis aonisalis Walker, 1859

Species of moth

Hydriris aonisalis is a moth in the family Crambidae. It is found on Borneo.
