= Ommatospila decoralis =

Scientific classification
- Kingdom: Animalia
- Phylum: Arthropoda
- Class: Insecta
- Order: Lepidoptera
- Family: Crambidae
- Genus: Ommatospila
- Species: O. decoralis

Binomial name
- Ommatospila decoralis (Guenée, 1854)

Synonyms
- Scopula decoralis Guenée, 1854

Species of moth

Ommatospila decoralis is a moth in the family Crambidae. It was described by Achille Guenée in 1854. It is found in Brazil.
