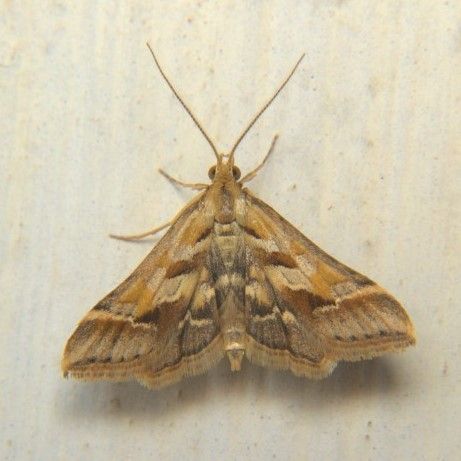

Scientific classification
- Kingdom: Animalia
- Phylum: Arthropoda
- Class: Insecta
- Order: Lepidoptera
- Family: Crambidae
- Genus: Diasemia
- Species: D. accalis

Binomial name
- Diasemia accalis (Walker, 1859)

Synonyms
- Scopula accalis Walker, 1859; Diasemia spilonotalis Snellen, 1880

= Diasemia accalis =

Species of moth

Diasemia accalis is a species of moth in the family Crambidae. It was described by Francis Walker in 1859. It is found in Sumatra, Indonesia, China, the north-western Himalayas, Myanmar, Malaysia, Taiwan, Korea, Japan, the Democratic Republic of the Congo and Rwanda.
