= Eurrhyparodes diffracta =

Scientific classification
- Kingdom: Animalia
- Phylum: Arthropoda
- Class: Insecta
- Order: Lepidoptera
- Family: Crambidae
- Genus: Eurrhyparodes
- Species: E. diffracta

Binomial name
- Eurrhyparodes diffracta Meyrick, 1936

Species of moth

Eurrhyparodes diffracta is a species of moth in the family Crambidae. It was described by Edward Meyrick in 1936. It is found in Peru.
