= Choristostigma leucosalis =

Scientific classification
- Kingdom: Animalia
- Phylum: Arthropoda
- Class: Insecta
- Order: Lepidoptera
- Family: Crambidae
- Genus: Choristostigma
- Species: C. leucosalis

Binomial name
- Choristostigma leucosalis (Barnes & McDunnough, 1914)

Synonyms
- Diasemia leucosalis Barnes & McDunnough, 1914

Species of moth

Choristostigma leucosalis is a moth in the family Crambidae. It was described by William Barnes and James Halliday McDunnough in 1914. It is found in Mexico and the southern United States, where it has been recorded from southern California, Arizona and Texas.

The wingspan is 15–17 mm. The forewings are light yellow with a slight sprinkling of brown scales and the veins are more or less marked in brown. The basal portion of the costa is shaded with purple brown. The lines are brown and the orbicular is round and more or less filled with purple brown. The reniform is a quadrate purplish blotch, the lower portion of which is usually lost in some brown scaling. There is a small quadrate hyaline white spot separating the reniform and orbicular. The hindwings are pale whitish yellow with a broad brown outer border, a minute discal dot and a median dark line. Adults are on wing in April and from October to November.
