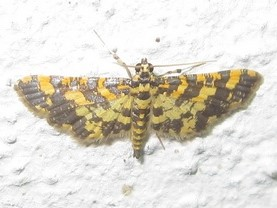

Scientific classification
- Kingdom: Animalia
- Phylum: Arthropoda
- Clade: Pancrustacea
- Class: Insecta
- Order: Lepidoptera
- Family: Crambidae
- Genus: Eurrhyparodes
- Species: E. tricoloralis

Binomial name
- Eurrhyparodes tricoloralis (Zeller, 1852)

Synonyms
- List: Botys tricoloralis Zeller, 1852; Isopteryx abnegatalis Walker, 1859; Eurrhyparodes confusalis Warren, 1896; Botys confusalis; Eurrhyparodes tricolaris

= Eurrhyparodes tricoloralis =

Species of moth

Eurrhyparodes tricoloralis is a species of moth of the family Crambidae. It occurs in Africa, Seychelles, Chagos Archipelago, Réunion, Australia, India, Japan, Hong Kong, Indonesia, New Guinea, Philippines, Sri Lanka and other countries of the far-east.
