= Choristostigma zephyralis =

Scientific classification
- Kingdom: Animalia
- Phylum: Arthropoda
- Class: Insecta
- Order: Lepidoptera
- Family: Crambidae
- Genus: Choristostigma
- Species: C. zephyralis

Binomial name
- Choristostigma zephyralis (Barnes & McDunnough, 1914)

Synonyms
- Diasemia zephyralis Barnes & McDunnough, 1914

Species of moth

Choristostigma zephyralis is a moth in the family Crambidae first described by William Barnes and James Halliday McDunnough in 1914. It is found in North America, where it has been recorded from California.

The wingspan is about 23 mm. The forewings are sulphur yellow shading into orange yellow terminally. The costa is purple to the reniform. The orbicular is oval and the reniform has the figure of an eight. Both are filled with purple and attached to the costal stripe. The hindwings are sulphur yellow with a subbasal dark line which is only prominent above the inner margin. There is a small discal dot and a subterminal line. There is purplish suffusion beyond this line. Adults are on wing from April to July.

The larvae feed on Monardella villosa.
