= Gonocausta zephyralis =

Scientific classification
- Kingdom: Animalia
- Phylum: Arthropoda
- Class: Insecta
- Order: Lepidoptera
- Family: Crambidae
- Genus: Gonocausta
- Species: G. zephyralis

Binomial name
- Gonocausta zephyralis Lederer, 1863

Synonyms
- Sameodes zophyralis Dyar, 1914

Species of moth

Gonocausta zephyralis is a moth in the family Crambidae. It was described by Julius Lederer in 1863. It is found on Ambon Island in Indonesia, Ecuador, Costa Rica and Honduras.
