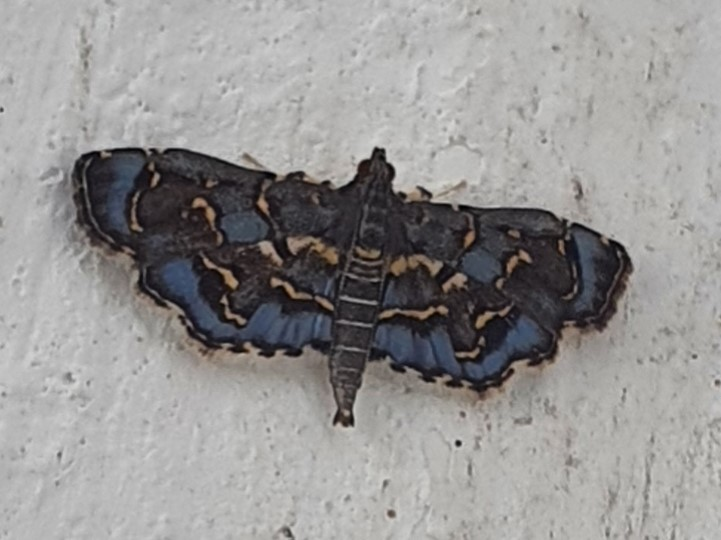

Scientific classification
- Kingdom: Animalia
- Phylum: Arthropoda
- Clade: Pancrustacea
- Class: Insecta
- Order: Lepidoptera
- Family: Crambidae
- Genus: Eurrhyparodes
- Species: E. splendens

Binomial name
- Eurrhyparodes splendens H. Druce, 1895

= Eurrhyparodes splendens =

Species of moth

Eurrhyparodes splendens is a species of moth in the family Crambidae. It was described by Herbert Druce in 1895. It is found in the US from Arizona and Texas through the Mexican states of Xalapa, Veracruz, Morelos, Guerrero and Yucatán to Guatemala and Costa Rica.

== Description ==
The wingspan is about 19 mm. The forewings are dark brown, crossed by three fine waved yellowish-white lines. The third line, outer margin and part of the inner margin bordered by a metallic steel-blue band. The hindwings are crossed by two yellowish-white lines from the costal to the inner margin. There is a third waved line. Both the outer and inner margins are bordered with metallic steel blue. Adults are on wing in July, September and December.
