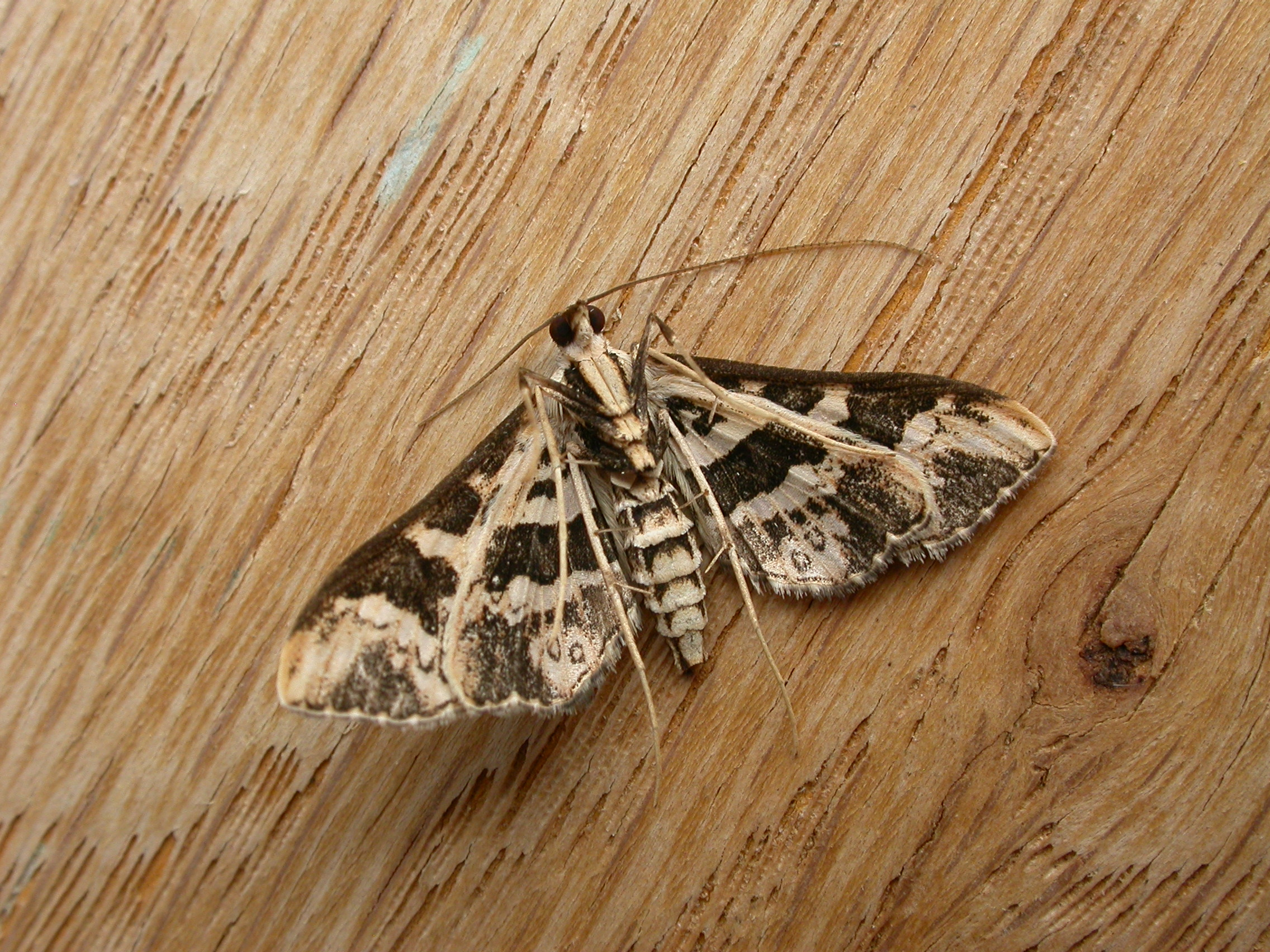

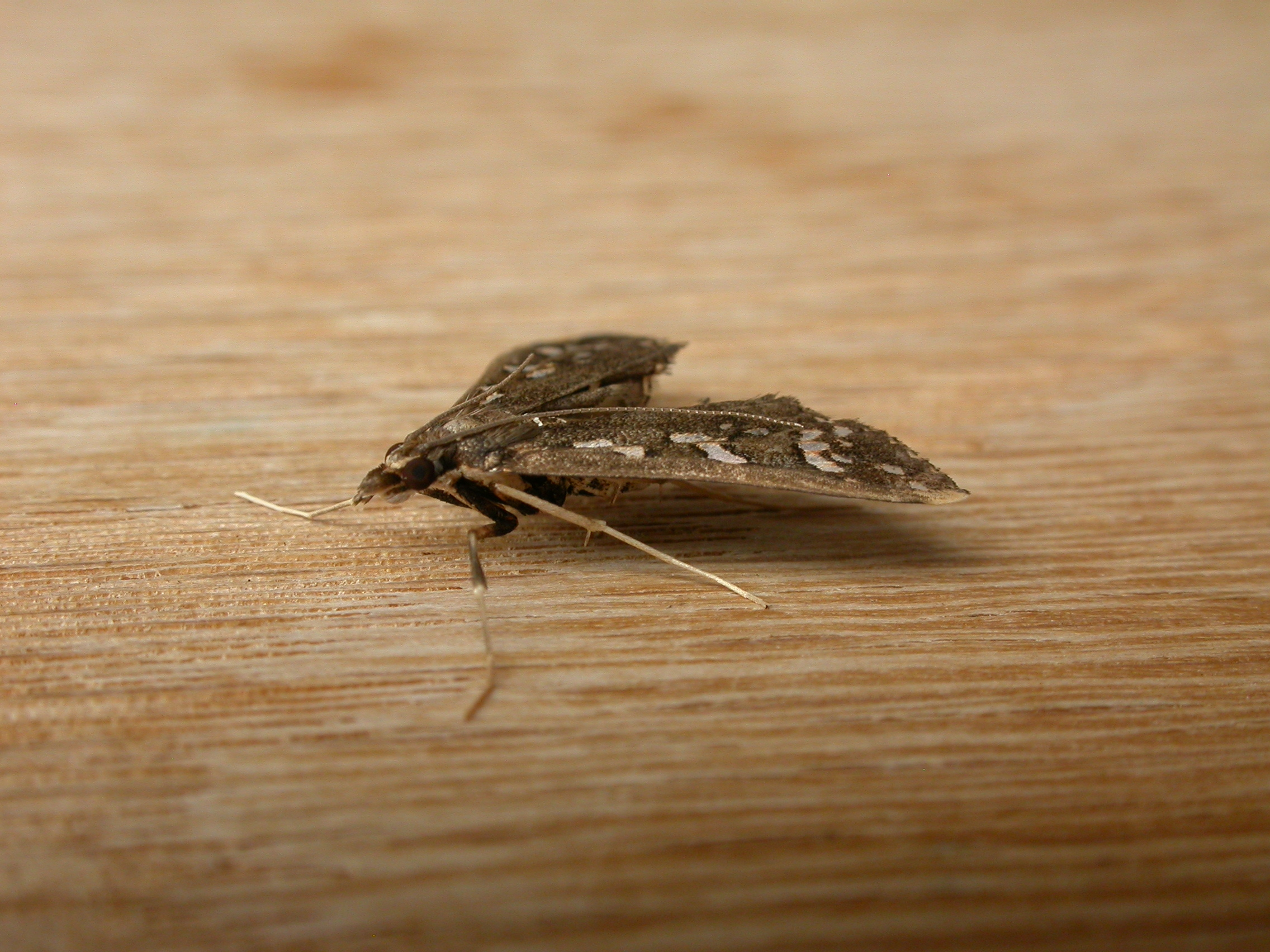

Scientific classification
- Domain: Eukaryota
- Kingdom: Animalia
- Phylum: Arthropoda
- Class: Insecta
- Order: Lepidoptera
- Family: Crambidae
- Genus: Ischnurges
- Species: I. illustralis

Binomial name
- Ischnurges illustralis Lederer, 1863

Synonyms
- Nesolocha autolitha Meyrick, 1886

= Ischnurges illustralis =

Species of moth

Ischnurges illustralis is a moth of the family Crambidae. The species was first described by Julius Lederer in 1863. It is known from Australia and New Guinea.

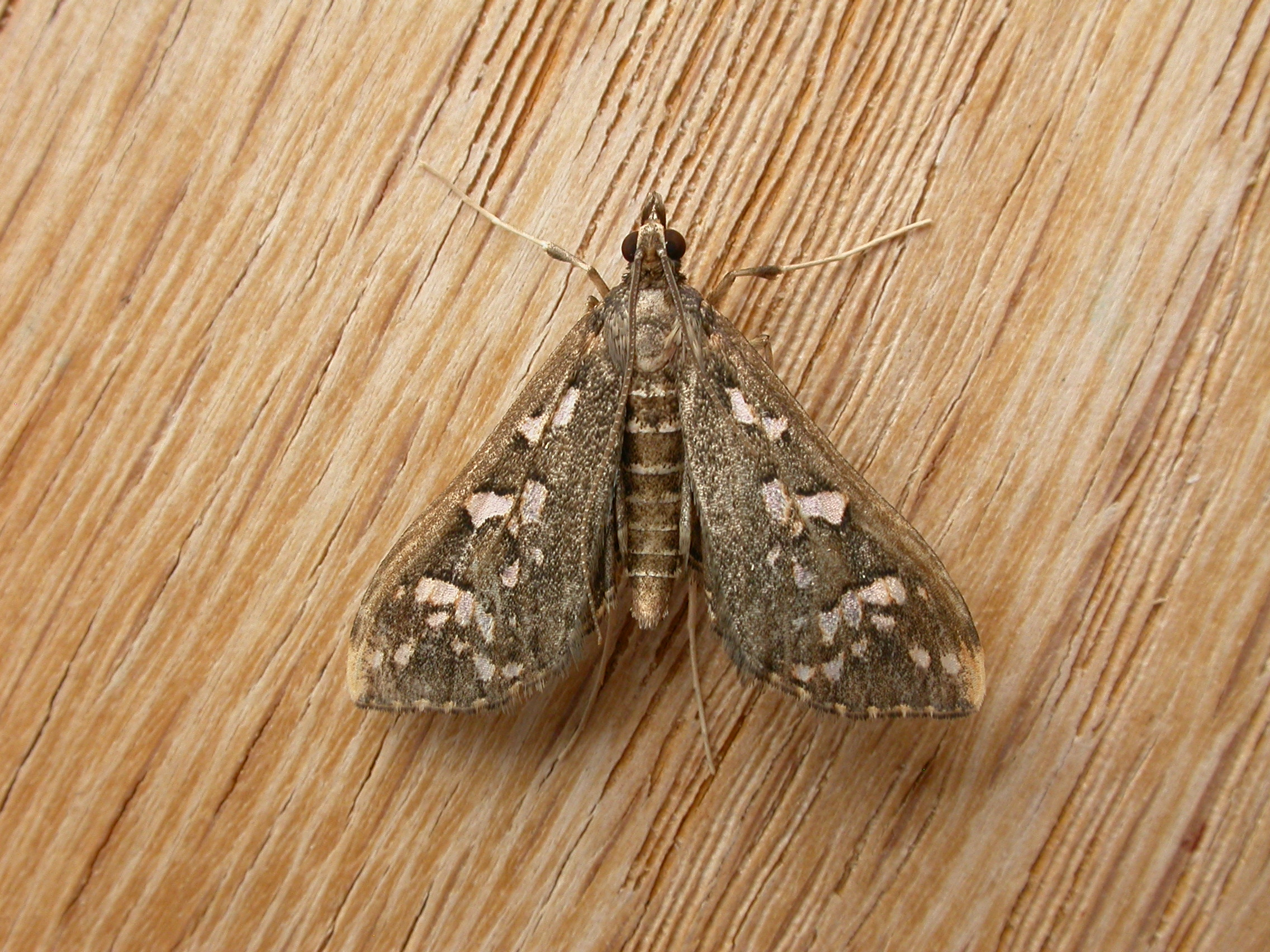
