= Hydriris angustalis =

Scientific classification
- Kingdom: Animalia
- Phylum: Arthropoda
- Class: Insecta
- Order: Lepidoptera
- Family: Crambidae
- Genus: Hydriris
- Species: H. angustalis

Binomial name
- Hydriris angustalis Snellen, 1895

Species of moth

Hydriris angustalis is a moth in the family Crambidae. It is found on Java.
