= Rhectothyris =

Scientific classification
- Kingdom: Animalia
- Phylum: Arthropoda
- Class: Insecta
- Order: Lepidoptera
- Family: Crambidae
- Subfamily: Spilomelinae
- Genus: Rhectothyris; Warren, 1890

Genus of moths

Rhectothyris is a genus of moths of the family Crambidae, tribe of Hydririni, described by Warren in 1890.

== Species ==
- Rhectothyris rosea (Warren, 1896)

== Former species ==
- Rhectothyris gratiosalis (Walker, 1859)
