= Choristostigma laetalis =

Scientific classification
- Kingdom: Animalia
- Phylum: Arthropoda
- Class: Insecta
- Order: Lepidoptera
- Family: Crambidae
- Genus: Choristostigma
- Species: C. laetalis

Binomial name
- Choristostigma laetalis (Hampson, 1900)

Synonyms
- Diasemia laetalis Hampson, 1900

Species of moth

Choristostigma laetalis is a moth in the family Crambidae. It was described by George Hampson in 1900. It is found in Uzbekistan.
