= Hydriris chalybitis =

Scientific classification
- Kingdom: Animalia
- Phylum: Arthropoda
- Class: Insecta
- Order: Lepidoptera
- Family: Crambidae
- Genus: Hydriris
- Species: H. chalybitis

Binomial name
- Hydriris chalybitis Meyrick, 1885

Species of moth

Hydriris chalybitis is a moth in the family Crambidae. It is found in Australia, where it has been recorded from Queensland. It has also been recorded from Taiwan.

Adults have narrow brown wings with a darker streak near the tip of the forewings.
