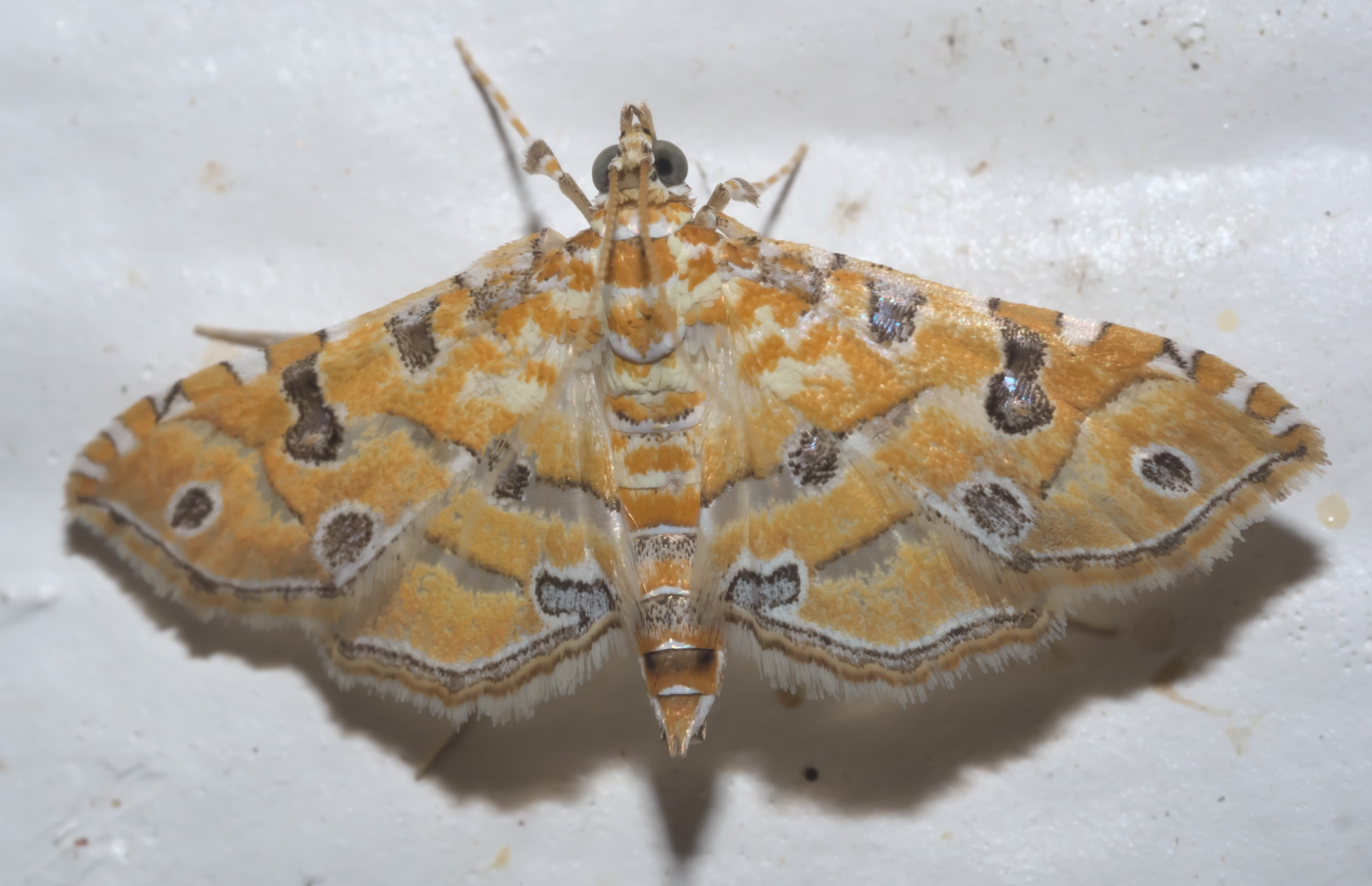

Scientific classification
- Kingdom: Animalia
- Phylum: Arthropoda
- Class: Insecta
- Order: Lepidoptera
- Family: Crambidae
- Genus: Ommatospila
- Species: O. narcaeusalis

Binomial name
- Ommatospila narcaeusalis (Walker, 1859)

Synonyms
- Leucochroma narcaeusalis Walker, 1859; Leucinodes venustalis Walker, 1866; Ommatospila nummulalis Lederer, 1863

= Ommatospila narcaeusalis =

Species of moth

Ommatospila narcaeusalis, the ommatospila moth, is a moth of the family Crambidae described by Francis Walker in 1859. It can be found in the southern parts of the United States, South America and several Caribbean islands, such as the Antilles and Jamaica.
