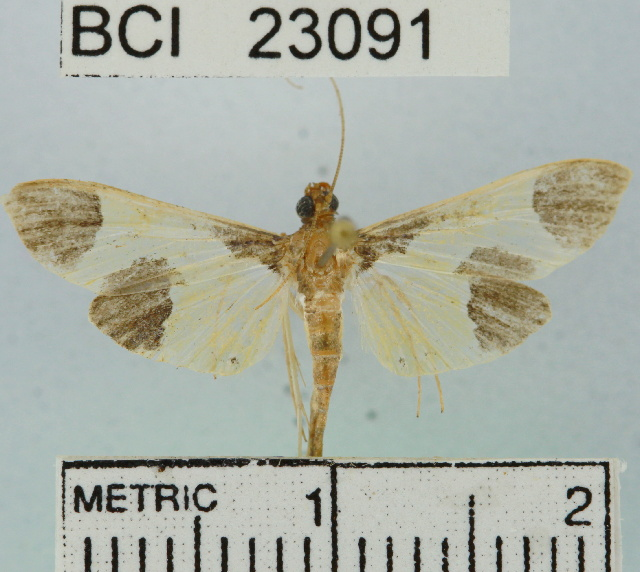
- Syllepis hortalis

Scientific classification
- Kingdom: Animalia
- Phylum: Arthropoda
- Class: Insecta
- Order: Lepidoptera
- Family: Crambidae
- Subfamily: Spilomelinae
- Genus: Syllepis; Poey, 1832

= Syllepis =

Genus of moths

Syllepis is a genus of moths of the family Crambidae described by Felipe Poey in 1832.

== Species ==
- Syllepis aurora Munroe, 1959
- Syllepis hortalis (Walker, 1859)
- Syllepis latimarginalis Munroe, 1970
- Syllepis marialis Poey, 1832
- Syllepis religiosa Munroe, 1963
- Syllepis semifuneralis Munroe, 1970
- Syllepis triangulifera Munroe, 1970
