= Rhynchetria =

Scientific classification
- Domain: Eukaryota
- Kingdom: Animalia
- Phylum: Arthropoda
- Class: Insecta
- Order: Lepidoptera
- Family: Crambidae
- Subfamily: Pyraustinae
- Genus: Rhynchetria; Klunder van Gijen, 1913
- Species: R. damasales

Binomial name
- Rhynchetria damasales Klunder van Gijen, 1913

Genus of moths

Rhynchetria is a genus of moths of the family Crambidae. It contains only one species, Rhynchetria damasales, which is found on Java.
