= Choristostigma erubescens =

Scientific classification
- Kingdom: Animalia
- Phylum: Arthropoda
- Class: Insecta
- Order: Lepidoptera
- Family: Crambidae
- Genus: Choristostigma
- Species: C. erubescens

Binomial name
- Choristostigma erubescens (Hampson, 1899)

Synonyms
- Diasemia erubescens Hampson, 1899

Species of moth

Choristostigma erubescens is a moth in the family Crambidae. It was described by George Hampson in 1899. It is found in Xalapa, Mexico.

The wingspan is about 18 mm. The forewings are yellow, irrorated (sprinkled) with rufous scales. There is an indistinct dark sinuous antemedial line and a leaden annulus in the cell, as well as a postmedial leaden band with black edges. There is a dark point on the costa towards the apex and a waved subterminal leaden band. The hindwings are whitish with a dark discoidal point and traces of a medial line on the inner area.
