= Rodaba =

Scientific classification
- Domain: Eukaryota
- Kingdom: Animalia
- Phylum: Arthropoda
- Class: Insecta
- Order: Lepidoptera
- Family: Crambidae
- Subfamily: Pyraustinae
- Genus: Rodaba; Moore, 1888

Genus of moths

Rodaba is a genus of moths of the family Crambidae.

== Species ==
- Rodaba angulipennis Moore, 1888
- Rodaba violalis Caradja in Caradja & Meyrick, 1937
