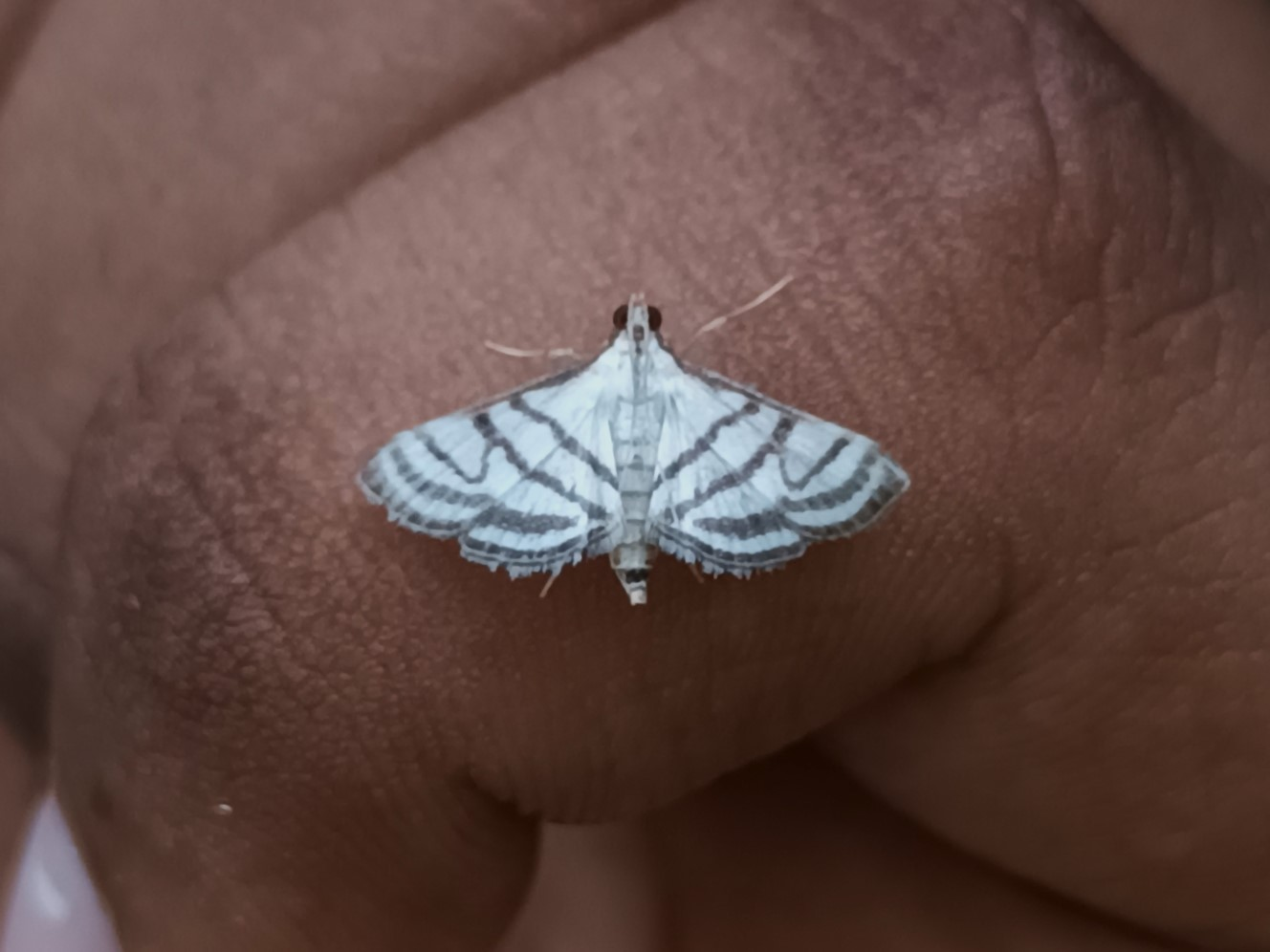

Scientific classification
- Kingdom: Animalia
- Phylum: Arthropoda
- Class: Insecta
- Order: Lepidoptera
- Family: Crambidae
- Subfamily: Pyraustinae
- Genus: Ravanoa; Moore, 1885
- Species: R. xiphialis

Binomial name
- Ravanoa xiphialis (Walker, 1859)

Synonyms
- Zebronia xiphialis Walker, 1859; Zebronia bilineolalis Walker, [1866]

= Ravanoa =

Genus of moths

Ravanoa is a monotypic moth genus of the family Crambidae described by Frederic Moore in 1885. It contains only one species, Ravanoa xiphialis, described by Francis Walker in 1859, which is found in Sri Lanka, Myanmar and on Borneo.
