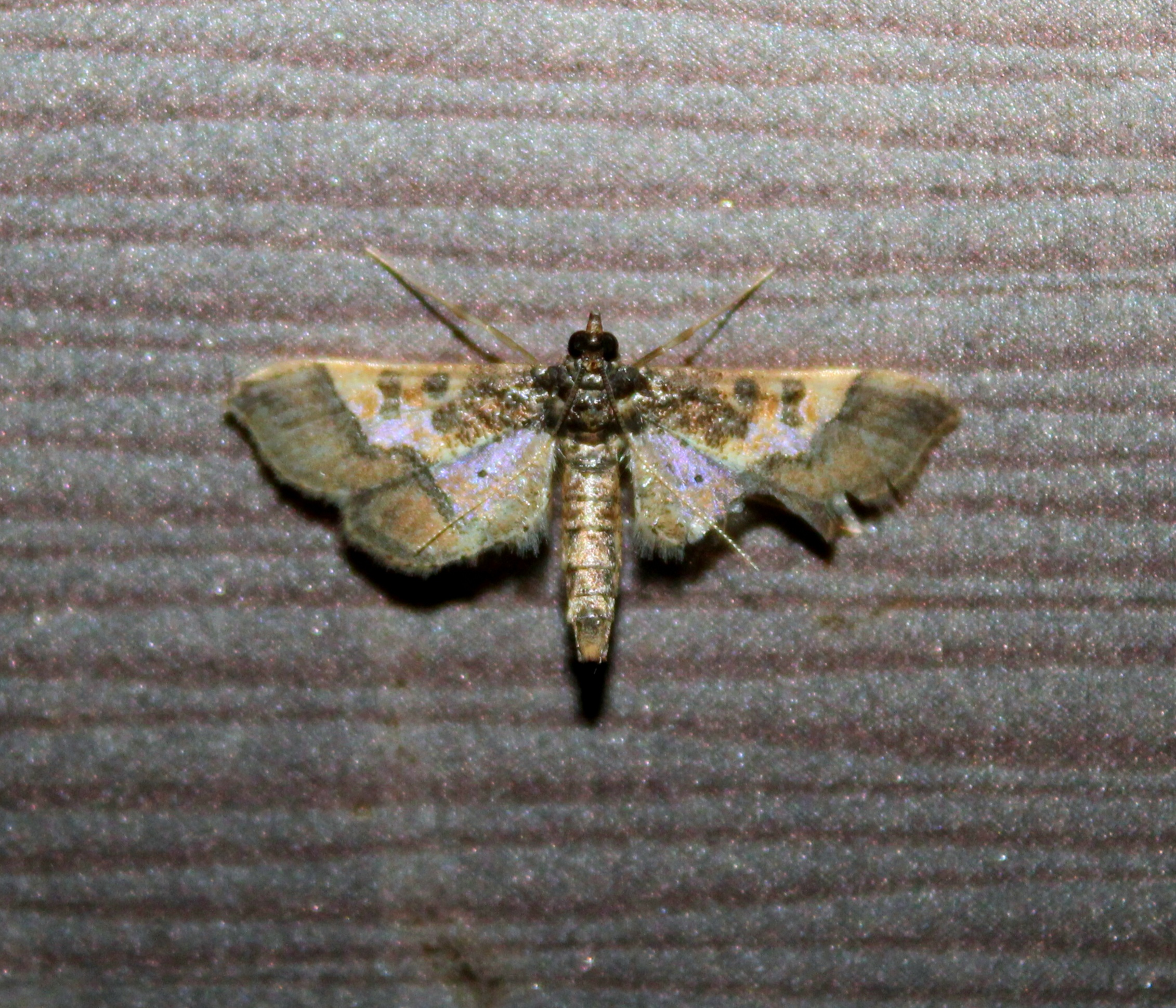

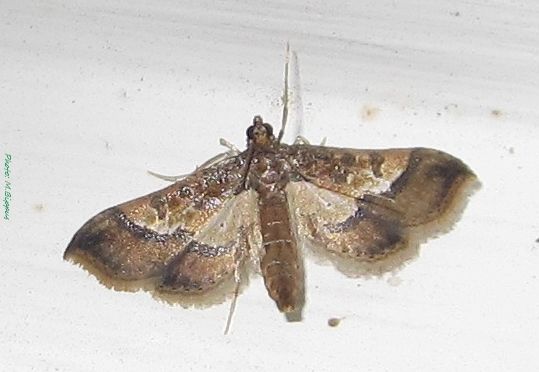

Scientific classification
- Kingdom: Animalia
- Phylum: Arthropoda
- Class: Insecta
- Order: Lepidoptera
- Family: Crambidae
- Genus: Hydriris
- Species: H. ornatalis

Binomial name
- Hydriris ornatalis (Duponchel, 1832)

Synonyms
- Asopia ornatalis Duponchel, 1832; Antiercta ornatlis; Nymphula saturnalis Treitschke, 1835; Pyralis deciusalis Walker, 1859; Botys invenustalis Walker, 1866; Cataclysta fraterna Butler, 1875; Stenia pulchellalis Mabille, 1880; Ercta orientalis Yamanaka, 1972; Nymphula bifascialis Heeger, 1838

= Hydriris ornatalis =

Species of moth

Hydriris ornatalis, the ornate hydriris, is a moth of the family Crambidae. It has a wide distribution and is known from southern Europe, Asia, Australia, Africa and North America, where it is restricted to Florida.

The wingspan is about 16 mm.

The larvae feed on Convolvulaceae species, including Ipomoea aquatica.
