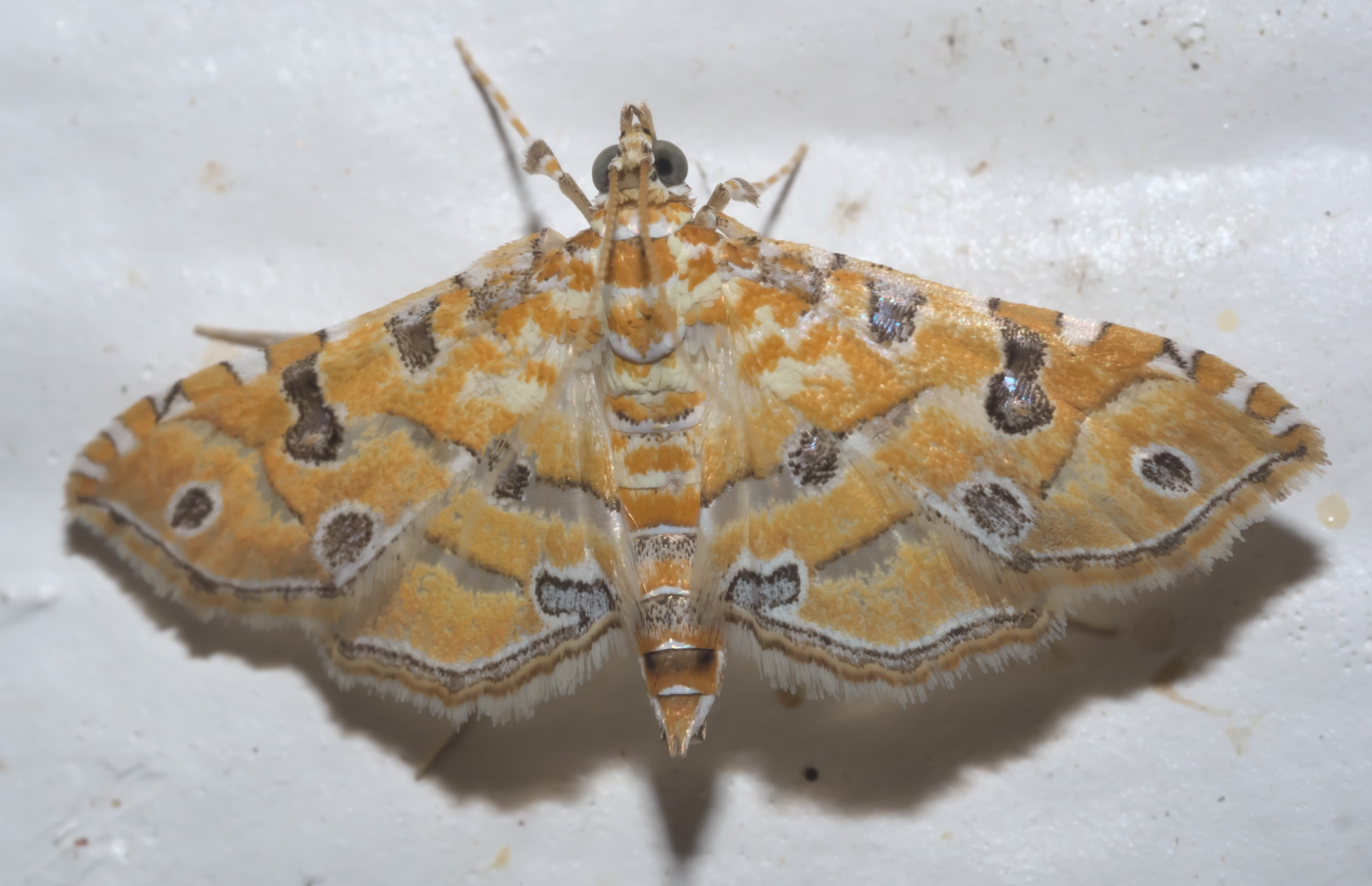
- Ommatospila narcaeusalis

Scientific classification
- Kingdom: Animalia
- Phylum: Arthropoda
- Clade: Pancrustacea
- Class: Insecta
- Order: Lepidoptera
- Family: Crambidae
- Subfamily: Spilomelinae
- Genus: Ommatospila; Lederer, 1863

Synonyms
- Thelda Walker, 1866

= Ommatospila =

Genus of moths

Ommatospila is a genus of moths of the family Crambidae. The genus was described by Julius Lederer in 1863.

== Species ==
- Ommatospila decoralis (Guenée, 1854)
- Ommatospila descriptalis (Walker, 1866)
- Ommatospila narcaeusalis (Walker, 1859)
