= Nehydriris =

Scientific classification
- Kingdom: Animalia
- Phylum: Arthropoda
- Class: Insecta
- Order: Lepidoptera
- Family: Crambidae
- Subfamily: Spilomelinae
- Genus: Nehydriris; Munroe, 1974
- Species: N. excellens

Binomial name
- Nehydriris excellens Munroe, 1974

Genus of moths

Nehydriris is a monotypic moth genus of the family Crambidae described by Eugene G. Munroe in 1974. It contains only one species, Nehydriris excellens, described by the same author in the same year, which is found in Rio de Janeiro, Brazil.
