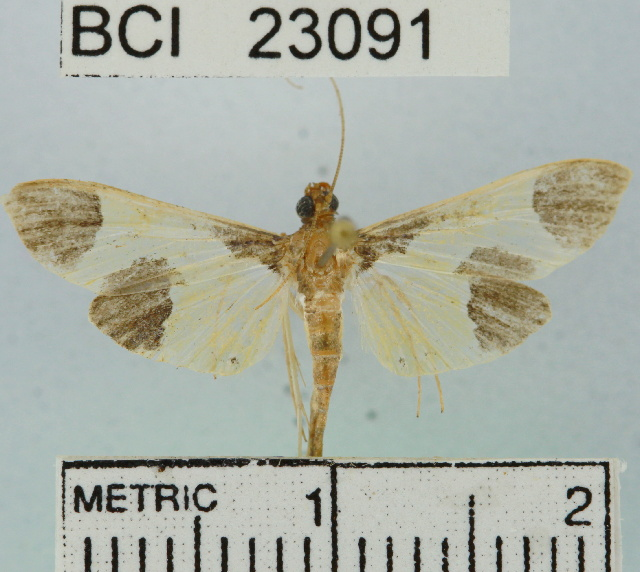

Scientific classification
- Kingdom: Animalia
- Phylum: Arthropoda
- Class: Insecta
- Order: Lepidoptera
- Family: Crambidae
- Genus: Syllepis
- Species: S. hortalis

Binomial name
- Syllepis hortalis (Walker, 1859)

Synonyms
- Botys hortalis Walker, 1859

= Syllepis hortalis =

Species of moth

Syllepis hortalis is a moth in the family Crambidae. It was described by Francis Walker in 1859. It is found in Argentina, Colombia, Brazil, Panama, Costa Rica and Mexico.
