= Rhectocraspeda =

Scientific classification
- Kingdom: Animalia
- Phylum: Arthropoda
- Class: Insecta
- Order: Lepidoptera
- Family: Crambidae
- Subfamily: Pyraustinae
- Genus: Rhectocraspeda; Warren, 1892

Synonyms
- Pilemia Möschler, 1882; Rapoona Hedemann, 1894; Rapona Schaus, 1940

Genus of moths

Rhectocraspeda is a genus of moths of the family Crambidae.

== Species ==
- Rhectocraspeda periusalis [eggplant webworm moth] (Walker, 1859)
