= Choristostigma =

Scientific classification
- Kingdom: Animalia
- Phylum: Arthropoda
- Class: Insecta
- Order: Lepidoptera
- Family: Crambidae
- Subfamily: Spilomelinae
- Genus: Choristostigma; Warren, 1892

Synonyms
- Namangania Amsel, 1952

Genus of moths

Choristostigma is a genus of moths of the family Crambidae.

== Species ==
- Choristostigma disputalis (Barnes & McDunnough, 1917)
- Choristostigma elegantalis Warren, 1892
- Choristostigma erubescens (Hampson, 1899)
- Choristostigma laetalis (Hampson, 1900)
- Choristostigma leucosalis (Barnes & McDunnough, 1914)
- Choristostigma particolor (Dyar, 1914)
- Choristostigma perpulchralis
- Choristostigma plumbosignalis Fernald, 1888
- Choristostigma roseopennalis (Hulst, 1886)
- Choristostigma zephyralis
