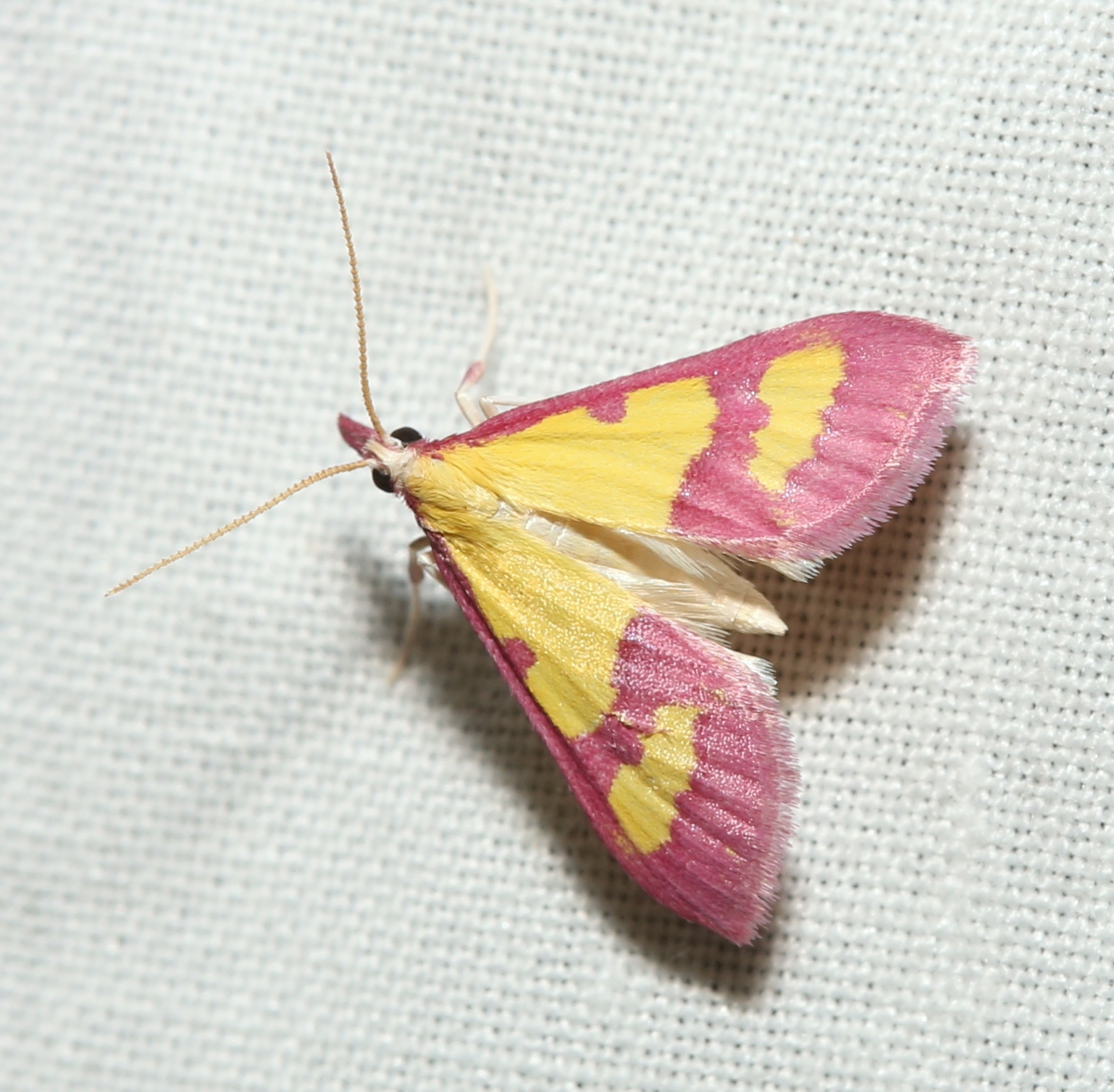

Scientific classification
- Kingdom: Animalia
- Phylum: Arthropoda
- Class: Insecta
- Order: Lepidoptera
- Family: Crambidae
- Genus: Choristostigma
- Species: C. roseopennalis

Binomial name
- Choristostigma roseopennalis (Hulst, 1886)

Synonyms
- Botis roseopennalis Hulst, 1886; Pyrausta roseipennalis

= Choristostigma roseopennalis =

Species of moth

Choristostigma roseopennalis is a moth in the family Crambidae. It was described by George Duryea Hulst in 1886. It is found in Mexico and the United States, where it has been recorded from Arizona, Georgia, Indiana, Maryland, North Carolina, Ohio, Tennessee and Texas.

The wingspan is about 18 mm. The forewings are canary yellow and the costa is bright rosy for two-thirds from the base. There is a bright rosy outer band, which merges with a broad marginal band of the same color at the inner angle. The hindwings are white. Adults are on wing from May to September.
