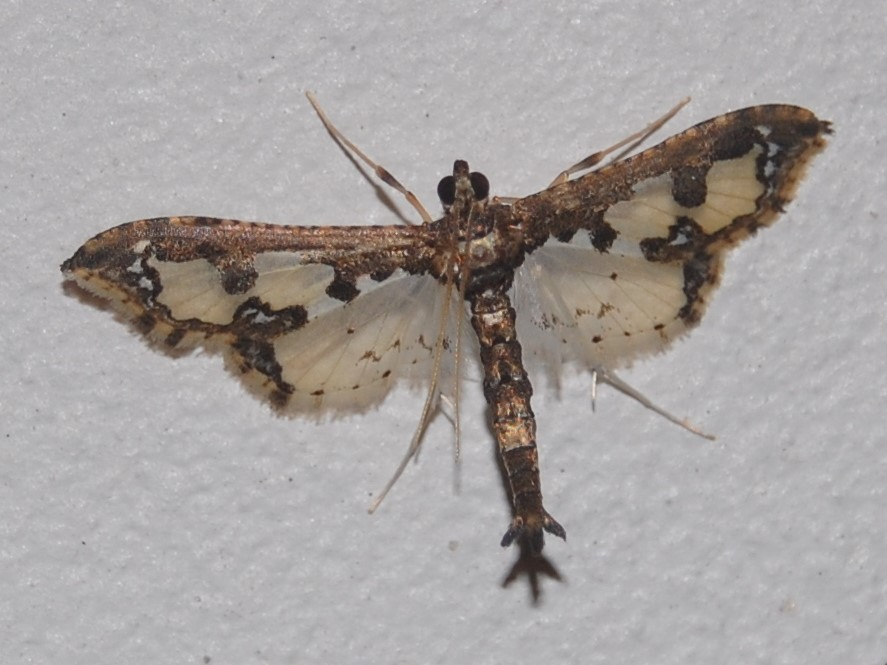

Scientific classification
- Kingdom: Animalia
- Phylum: Arthropoda
- Class: Insecta
- Order: Lepidoptera
- Family: Crambidae
- Genus: Gonocausta
- Species: G. voralis

Binomial name
- Gonocausta voralis (Schaus, 1920)

Synonyms
- Eurrhyparodes voralis Schaus, 1920

= Gonocausta voralis =

Species of moth

Gonocausta voralis is a species of moth in the family Crambidae. It was described by Schaus in 1920. It is found in Brazil (São Paulo).
