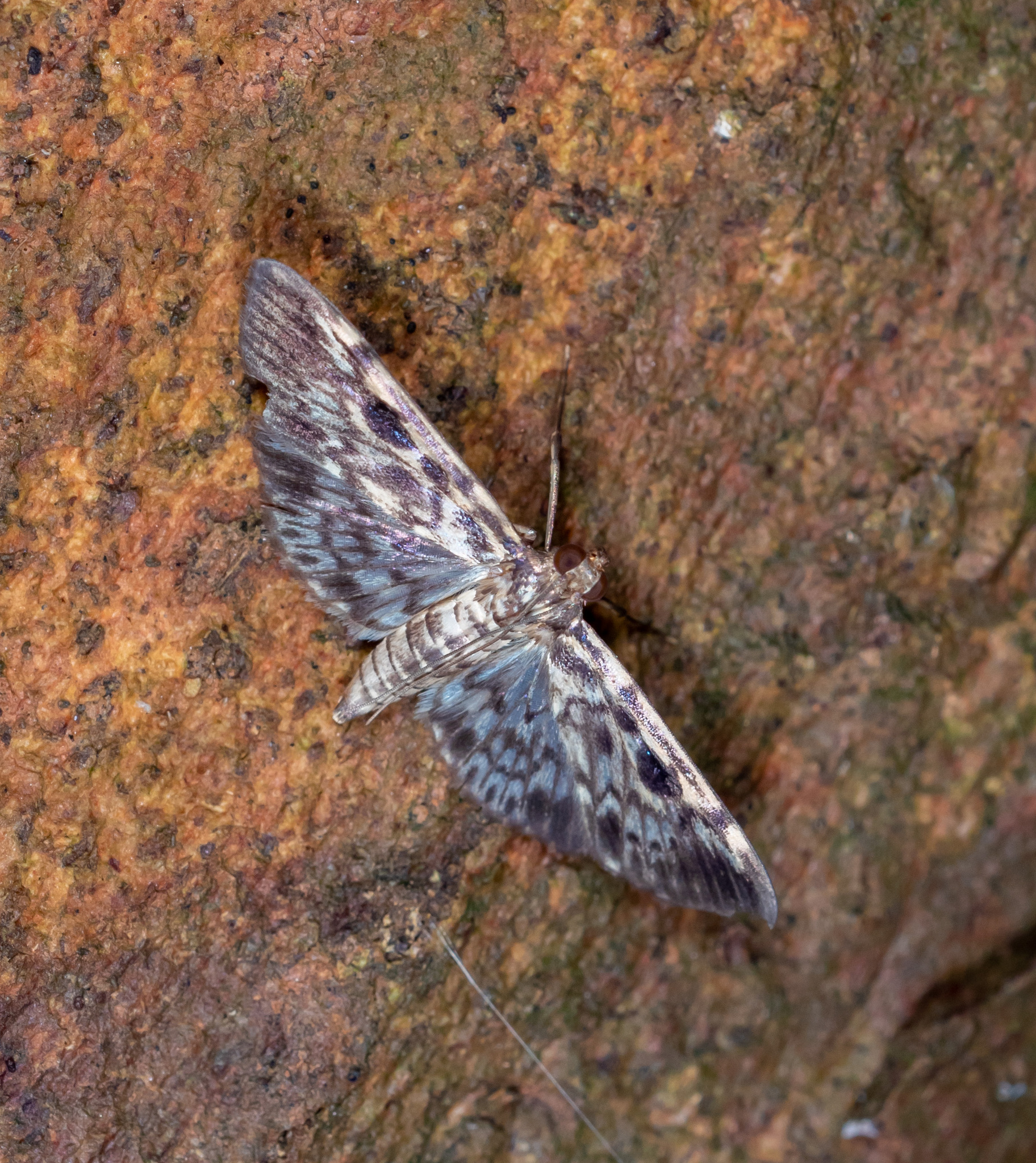
- R. macrostigma from Kuala Lumpur, Malaysia

Scientific classification
- Domain: Eukaryota
- Kingdom: Animalia
- Phylum: Arthropoda
- Class: Insecta
- Order: Lepidoptera
- Family: Crambidae
- Subfamily: Spilomelinae
- Genus: Rhimphaliodes; Hampson, 1893
- Species: R. macrostigma

Binomial name
- Rhimphaliodes macrostigma Hampson, 1893

Synonyms
- Rhimphaleodes Hampson, 1896; Sylepta cyclotypa Turner, 1937

= Rhimphaliodes =

Genus of moths

Rhimphaliodes is a monotypic moth genus of the family Crambidae described by George Hampson in 1893. Its only species, Rhimphaliodes macrostigma, described by the same author in the same year, is found in Sri Lanka, on Borneo and in Australia, where it has been recorded from Queensland.

Adults are ochreous white, the forewings with some brown at the base and an antemedial brown line, a brown spot in the middle of the cell and a large black stigma filling the end of the cell, with a minute white spot on its upper edge. There is also a waved postmedial line and the outer margin is broadly brown, especially at the apex and outer angle. The hindwings have medial and postmedial indistinct waved lines. The outer margin is suffused with fuscous, most broadly at the apex and the anal angle.
