= Choristostigma elegantalis =

Scientific classification
- Kingdom: Animalia
- Phylum: Arthropoda
- Class: Insecta
- Order: Lepidoptera
- Family: Crambidae
- Genus: Choristostigma
- Species: C. elegantalis

Binomial name
- Choristostigma elegantalis Warren, 1892

Synonyms
- Metasia argalis Fernald, 1894

Species of moth

Choristostigma elegantalis is a moth in the family Crambidae. It was described by Warren in 1892. It is found in North America, where it has been recorded from Arizona, California and Washington.

The length of the forewings is 9–11.5 mm. The forewings are pale yellow with tawny markings. The costa is suffused with tawny along the basal half. Both the first and second lines are brown. The hindwings are yellowish white with a dark central spot and faint traces of a curved submarginal band. Adults have been recorded on wing from April to September.
