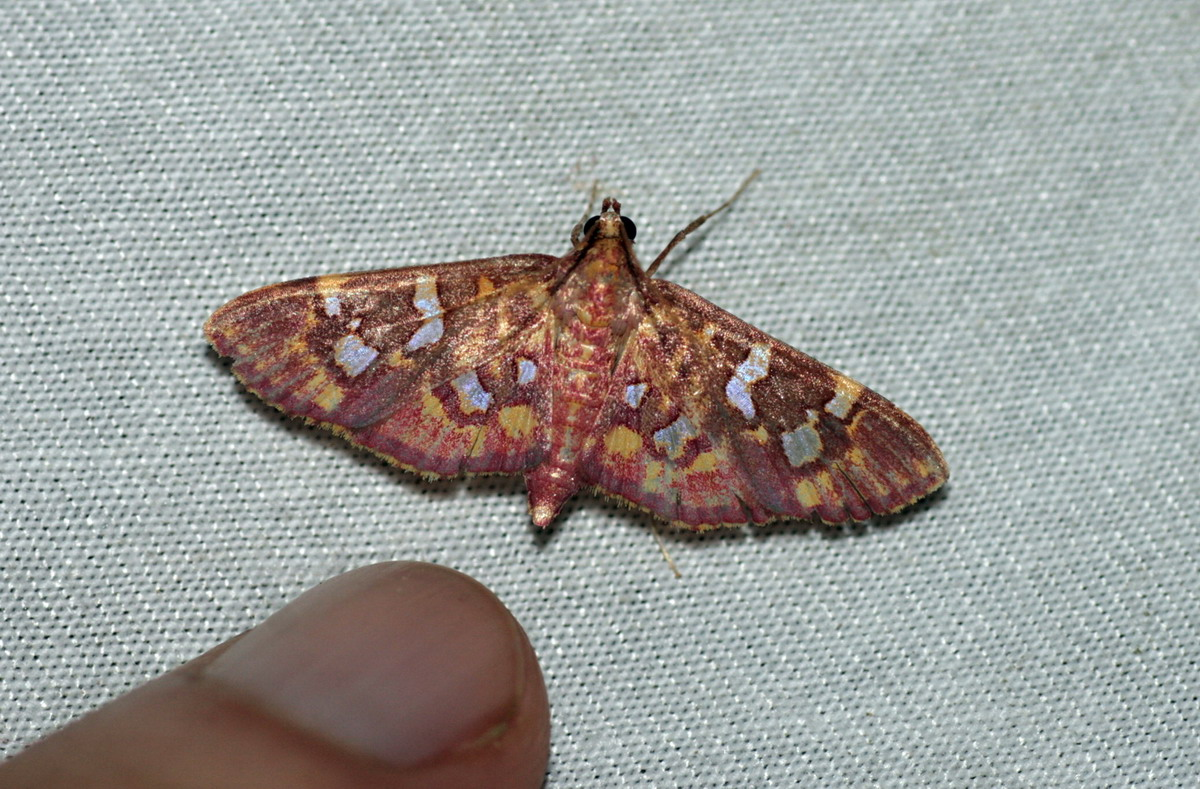
- Ischnurges gratiosalis - Borneo, Crocker Range National Park.

Scientific classification
- Kingdom: Animalia
- Phylum: Arthropoda
- Clade: Pancrustacea
- Class: Insecta
- Order: Lepidoptera
- Family: Crambidae
- Genus: Ischnurges
- Species: I. gratiosalis

Binomial name
- Ischnurges gratiosalis (Walker, 1859)

Synonyms
- Samea gratiosalis Walker, 1859; Asopia roridalis Walker, 1859

= Ischnurges gratiosalis =

Species of moth

Ischnurges gratiosalis is a moth in the family Crambidae. It was described by Francis Walker in 1859. It is found in Sri Lanka, China, Taiwan and India and on Borneo and the Maldives.

Adults are rose coloured, irregularly varied with yellow, yellowish white and partly clouded with rose colour beneath. The forewings have two vitreous bands, as do the hindwings.
