= List of moths of the Maldives =

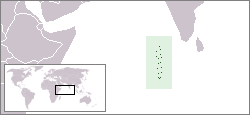
Location of the Maldives

Moths of the Maldives represent about 83 known moth species. The moths (mostly nocturnal) and butterflies (mostly diurnal) together make up the taxonomic order Lepidoptera.

About 130 species of insects (including arachnids, flies and ants) have been recorded from the Maldives. In addition, more than 67 butterfly species have been identified.

This is a list of moth species which have been recorded on the Maldives.

== Choreutidae ==
- Anthophila submarginalis (Walker, 1865)
- Choreutis ophiosema

== Crambidae ==
- Bradina admixtalis (Walker, 1859)
- Cirrhochrista annulifera
- Cnaphalocrocis medinalis
- Conogethes punctiferalis
- Cydalima laticostalis
- Diaphania indica (Saunders, 1851)
- Diasemia accalis
- Eurrhyparodes tricoloralis (Zeller, 1852)
- Glyphodes bivitralis Guenée, 1854
- Glyphodes caesalis
- Haritalodes derogata (Fabricius, 1775)
- Hellula undalis
- Hydriris ornatalis (Duponchel, 1832)
- Ischnurges gratiosalis (Walker, 1859)
- Lamprosema niphealis (Walker, 1859)
- Leucinodes orbonalis Guenée, 1854
- Maruca vitrata
- Omiodes diemenalis (Guenée, 1854)
- Parapoynx diminutalis
- Parapoynx stagnalis (Zeller, 1852)
- Parapoynx stagnalis (Zeller, 1852)
- Parapoynx fluctuosalis (Guenée, 1854)
- Parotis suralis (Lederer, 1863)
- Psara acrospila (Meyrick, 1886)
- Pyrausta phoenicealis
- Rehimena surusalis
- Sameodes cancellalis
- Spoladea recurvalis (Fabricius, 1775)
- Syllepte penthodes (Meyrick, 1902)

== Erebidae ==
- Anomis sabulifera
- Argina astrea
- Asota caricae
- Chalciope mygdon (Cramer, 1777)
- Dichromia sagitta
- Eublemma cochylioides
- Eudocima materna
- Euproctis fraterna
- Euproctis varians (Walker, 1855)
- Hydrillodes lentalis Guenée, 1854
- Hypena indicatalis Walker, 1859
- Hypena jussalis Walker, 1859
- Hypena laceratalis
- Maliattha signifera (Walker, 1857)
- Mocis frugalis
- Mocis undata
- Ophiusa coronata (Fabricius, 1775)
- Pantydia metaspila (Walker, 1857)
- Rhynchina obliqualis
- Simplicia robustalis Guenée, 1854
- Trigonodes hyppasia
- Utetheisa lotrix
- Utetheisa pulchella (Linnaeus, 1758)
- Utetheisa pulchelloides

== Geometridae ==
- Cyclophora anulifera (Hampson, 1893)
- Hyperythra lutea (Stoll, 1781)
- Mixocera parvulata (Walker, 1863)
- Pelagodes antiquadraria (Inoue, 1976)
- Racotis boarmiaria (Guenée, 1857)
- Scopula actuaria (Walker, 1861)
- Scopula addictaria (Walker, 1861)
- Scopula aspilataria (Walker, 1861)
- Scopula caesaria (Walker, 1861)

== Hyblaeidae ==
- Hyblaea puera (Cramer, 1777)

== Limacodidae ==
- Darna furva
- Natada sericea (Hampson, 1893)

== Noctuidae ==
- Aletia consanguis (Guenée, 1852)
- Anticarsia irrorata
- Athetis obtusa (Hampson, 1891)
- Chasmina candida (Walker, 1865)
- Chasmina tibialis (Fabricius, 1775)
- Chrysodeixis permissa (Walker, 1858)
- Gesonia obeditalis
- Helicoverpa assulta
- Polytela gloriosae (Fabricius, 1781)
- Spodoptera exigua
- Spodoptera litura
- Thyas honesta
- Thysanoplusia orichalcea

== Nolidae ==
- Earias vittella
- Nola squalida Staudinger, 1870

== Pterophoridae ==
- Sphenarches caffer (Zeller, 1851)

== Pyralidae ==
- Endotricha mesenterialis (Walker, 1859)
- Epicrocis lateritialis (Walker, 1863)
- Melathrix praetextella (Christoph, 1877)
- Termioptycha albifurcalis

== Scythrididae ==
- Scythris atollicola Nupponen, Saldaitis & Fischer, 2013

== Sphingidae ==
- Acherontia styx
- Agrius convolvuli
- Cephonodes hylas (Linnaeus, 1771)
- Cephonodes picus
- Macroglossum gyrans Walker, 1856
- Macroglossum sitiene Walker, 1856
- Macroglossum svetlana Eitschberger & Fischer, 2009
- Xylophanes thyelia (Linnaeus, 1758)

== Stathmopodidae ==
- Stathmopoda auriferella

== Thyrididae ==
- Striglina scitaria (Walker, 1863)

== Tortricidae ==
- Adoxophyes euryomis Meyrick, 1902
- Dudua aprobola
- Statherotis leucaspis (Meyrick, 1902)
