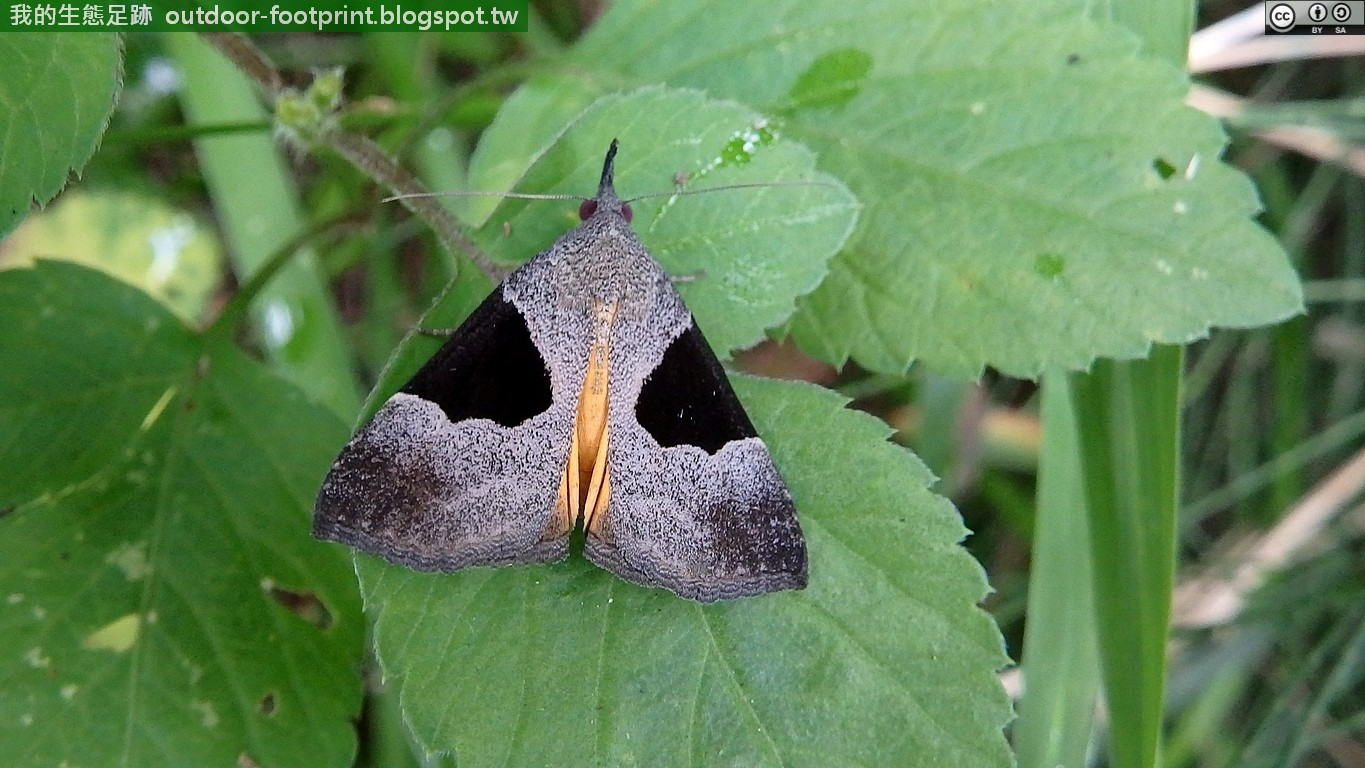

Scientific classification
- Kingdom: Animalia
- Phylum: Arthropoda
- Class: Insecta
- Order: Lepidoptera
- Superfamily: Noctuoidea
- Family: Erebidae
- Genus: Dichromia
- Species: D. orosia

Binomial name
- Dichromia orosia Meyrick, 1913

Synonyms
- Noctua sagitta Fabricius, 1775; Phalaena (Noctua) orosia Cramer, [1780]

= Dichromia orosia =

Species of moth

Dichromia orosia, sometimes as Dichromia sagitta, is a moth of the family Erebidae first described by Edward Meyrick in 1913. It is found in Sri Lanka and Australia. The caterpillar is a pest of Marsdenia species, Tylophora asthntatica and Tylophora indica.

== Description ==
Adult wingspan is 28–35 mm. Forewings greyish with dark brown scales. Head greyish brown. Antennae filiform (threadlike). Black striations are present on the brown eyes. Labial palpi with long blackish brown. Upperside of thorax dark brownish grey, where underside is pale yellow. Abdomen yellowish. There is a characteristic a large sub-triangular blackish-brown patch on the forewings. Hindwing yellow with greyish outer margin. Underside brownish grey. Females lay spherical pale yellowish eggs, which hatch in about 3 to 4 days. Caterpillars are visible from May to October. A single female produces five to six generations per year.

The caterpillar undergo five instars. It is a semilooper with three abdominal legs and four prolegs.

- First instar - Pale yellow in color. Body somewhat rectangular in shape. Length is 2.00-7.00 mm. Stage lasts for 2–3 days.
- Second instar - Head and body yellow with black spots and warts. Length is 7–11 mm. Stage lasts for 2–3 days.
- Third instar - Head and body yellow with prominent black warts. Length is 11.0-16.0 mm. Stage lasts for 2–3 days.
- Fourth instar - Similar to third instar, but larger in size. Length is 16.0-22.0 mm. Stage lasts for 2–3 days.
- Fifth instar - Head and body dark yellow with black warts all over the body. Setae present. Length is 22.0-30.0 mm. Stage lasts for 3–4 days.

Pupa brownish. Pupation in a cocoon made up of silken threads, plant leaf debris and excreta. Prepupal stage lasts for 1–2 days. Pupae reddish brown and pupal period lasting for 5–7 days.

== As a pest ==
The caterpillar is a voracious defoliator of Tylophora indica. They feed on both soft tender leaves and mature tough leaves. Early instars (first and second) only feed on the epidermis of the leaves, but late instars attack entire leaf tissue. Pest attacks were observed from May to October.

It also attacks Tylophora asthmatica, which is considered by some to be a medicinal plant. Pest attacks were recorded during July, August, December, January and February.
