= Dichromia indicatalis =

Scientific classification
- Kingdom: Animalia
- Phylum: Arthropoda
- Class: Insecta
- Order: Lepidoptera
- Superfamily: Noctuoidea
- Family: Erebidae
- Genus: Dichromia
- Species: D. indicatalis

Binomial name
- Dichromia indicatalis Walker, 1859

Synonyms
- Hypena indicatalis Walker, [1859]; Hypena caliginosa Wileman, 1911

Species of moth

Dichromia indicatalis is a moth of the family Erebidae first described by Francis Walker in 1859. It has a large distribution area of Indo-Australian tropics to Japan and Solomon Islands.

Forewings richer darker brown. Postmedial variably oblique and triarcuate. There is a black exterior to the apical lens. In male antennae, cilia on basal part is significantly shorter.
