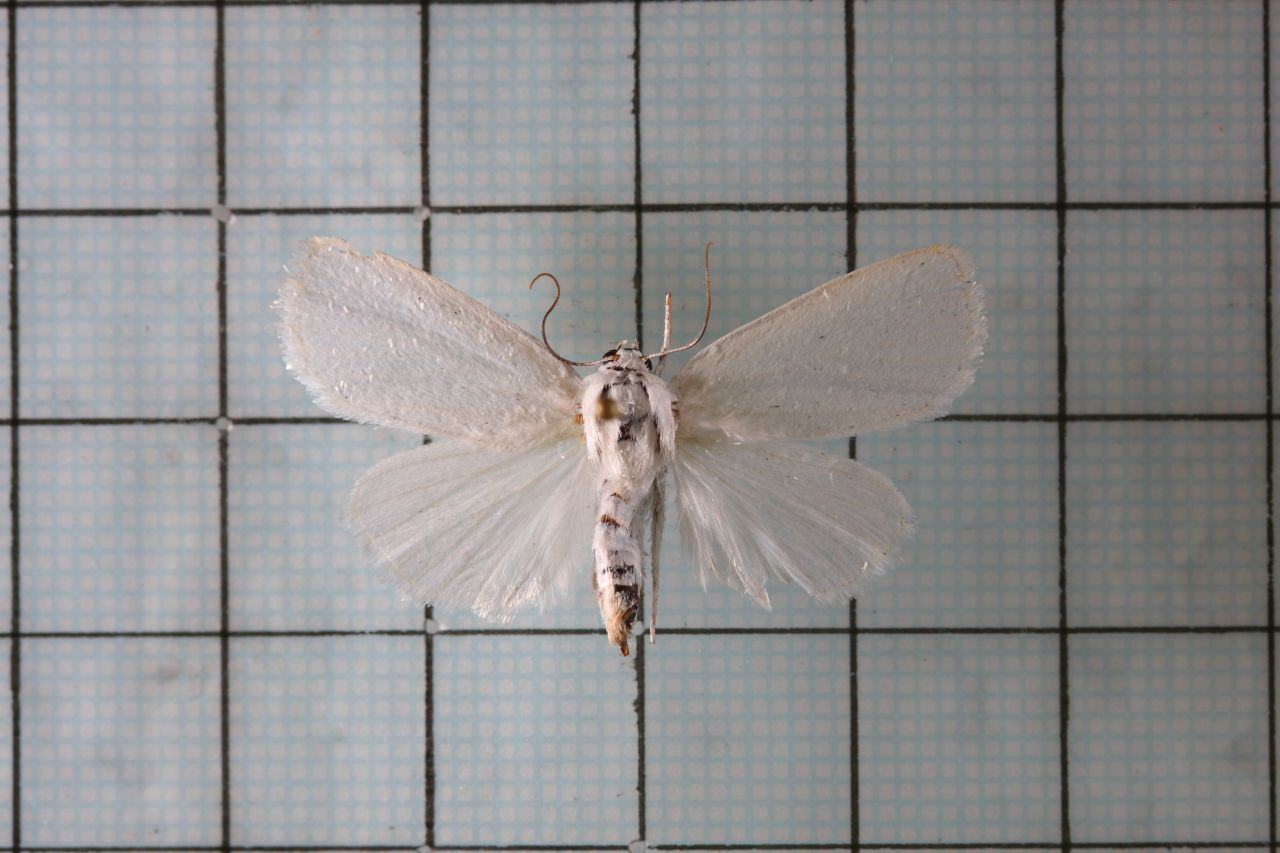

Scientific classification
- Kingdom: Animalia
- Phylum: Arthropoda
- Class: Insecta
- Order: Lepidoptera
- Superfamily: Noctuoidea
- Family: Noctuidae
- Subfamily: Amphipyrinae
- Genus: Chasmina; Walker, 1856

Synonyms
- Arbasera Walker, 1865; Casamba Walker, 1866; Carandana Moore, [1884]; Clinophlebia Hampson, 1893

= Chasmina =

Genus of moths

Chasmina is a genus of moths of the family Noctuidae.

== Species ==
- Chasmina alcidamea Druce, 1890
- Chasmina basiflava Holloway, 1979
- Chasmina candida Walker, 1865
- Chasmina coremata Holloway, 1989
- Chasmina fasciculosa Walker, 1858
- Chasmina gracilipalpis Warren, 1912
- Chasmina judicata Walker, 1858
- Chasmina lispodes Turner, 1936
- Chasmina malagasy Viette, 1965
- Chasmina mexicana Draudt, 1927
- Chasmina nigropunctata Bethune-Baker, 1908
- Chasmina pulchra Walker, [1858]
- Chasmina sundana Holloway, 1989
- Chasmina tenuilinea Hampson, 1910
- Chasmina tibialis (Fabricius, 1775)
- Chasmina tibiopunctata Bethune-Baker, 1908
- Chasmina verticata Warren, 1913
- Chasmina vestae (Guenée, 1852)
- Chasmina viridis Robinson, 1975
- Chasmina zonata Walker, 1866
