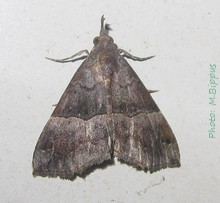
- Dichromia legrosi

Scientific classification
- Kingdom: Animalia
- Phylum: Arthropoda
- Class: Insecta
- Order: Lepidoptera
- Superfamily: Noctuoidea
- Family: Erebidae
- Subfamily: Hypeninae
- Genus: Dichromia; Guenée in Boisduval & Guenée, 1854

Type species
- Phalaena orosia Cramer, 1780

Synonyms
- Ametropalpis Mabille, 1884; Eugorna Holland, 1894; Camphypena Prout, 1927

= Dichromia =

Genus of moths

Dichromia is a genus of moths of the family Erebidae first described by Achille Guenée in 1854.

== Description ==
Palpi roughly scaled, where the second joint long and porrect (extending forward). Third joint obliquely upturned and ending in a naked point. A sharp frontal tuft present. Antennae minutely ciliated in the male. Forewings with the depressed and slightly acute apex. Veins 8 and 9 anastomosing (fusing) to form the areole. Hindwings with veins 3 and 4 from angle of cell. Vein 5 from below middle of discocellulars and veins 6 and 7 from upper angle.

== Species ==
Some species of this genus are:

- Dichromia aculeifera (Aurivillius, 1925)
- Dichromia albistriga (Mabille, 1900)
- Dichromia amica Butler, 1878
- Dichromia ampullata Holloway, 2008
- Dichromia aroa (Bethune-Baker, 1908)
- Dichromia carninalis Viette, 1956
- Dichromia claripennis Butler, 1878
- Dichromia cognata (Moore, 1885)
- Dichromia erastrialis (Walker, 1866)
- Dichromia euthygramma (Prout, 1921)
- Dichromia fascifera (Holland, 1894)
- Dichromia frustalis Warren, 1913
- Dichromia indicatalis Walker, 1859
- Dichromia isoplocalis Viette, 1956
- Dichromia legrosi (Guillermet, 1992)
- Dichromia limbopunctata (Strand, 1915)
- Dichromia mesomelaena (Hampson, 1902)
- Dichromia mutilata (Strand, 1909)
- Dichromia nasuta (Mabille, 1884)
- Dichromia occatus (Moore, 1882)
- Dichromia opulenta (Christoph, 1877)
- Dichromia orosia Meyrick, 1913
- Dichromia otiata Swinhoe, 1901
- Dichromia pullata Moore, 1885
- Dichromia quadralis Walker, 1859
- Dichromia quinqualis Walker, 1859
- Dichromia rationalis Viette, 1956
- Dichromia sagitta (Fabricius, 1775)
- Dichromia semlikiensis (Prout, 1921)
- Dichromia sieglinde Viette, 1956
- Dichromia thermesialis (Walker, 1866)
- Dichromia thomensis (Prout, 1927)
- Dichromia triangularis (Moore, 1882)
- Dichromia trigonalis Guenée, 1854
- Dichromia triplicalis Walker, 1859
- Dichromia xanthaspisalis Viette, 1956
