= Cirrhochrista punctulata =

Scientific classification
- Kingdom: Animalia
- Phylum: Arthropoda
- Class: Insecta
- Order: Lepidoptera
- Family: Crambidae
- Genus: Cirrhochrista
- Species: C. punctulata

Binomial name
- Cirrhochrista punctulata Hampson, 1896

Species of moth

Cirrhochrista punctulata is a moth in the family Crambidae. It was described by George Hampson in 1896. It is found in Australia, where it has been recorded from Queensland. It is mostly found in the mesophyll rainforest on Cape York in the Alexandra Range, Cape Tribulation and the Iron Range.
