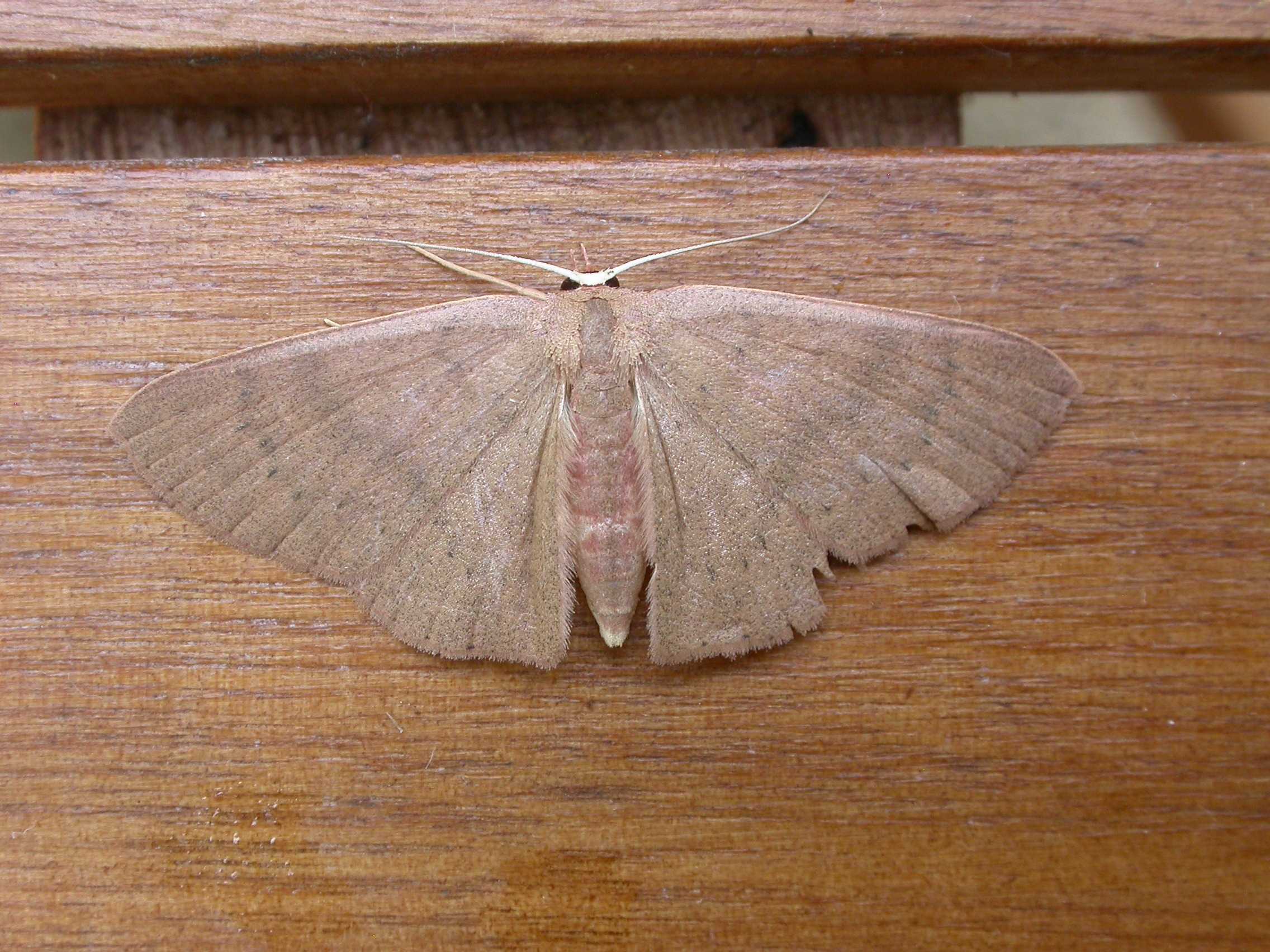

Scientific classification
- Kingdom: Animalia
- Phylum: Arthropoda
- Clade: Pancrustacea
- Class: Insecta
- Order: Lepidoptera
- Family: Geometridae
- Genus: Perixera
- Species: P. obliviaria

Binomial name
- Perixera obliviaria (Walker, 1861)

Synonyms
- Anisodes obliviaria Walker, 1861; Anisodes suspicaria Snellen, 1881; Perixera rufidorsata Warren, 1896; Perixera rufannularia Warren, 1897

= Perixera obliviaria =

Species of moth

Perixera obliviaria is a species of moth of the family Geometridae. It is found from the Indo-Australian tropics east to Queensland and Fiji.

The wingspan is about 30 mm.
