= Cirrhochrista cydippealis =

Scientific classification
- Kingdom: Animalia
- Phylum: Arthropoda
- Class: Insecta
- Order: Lepidoptera
- Family: Crambidae
- Genus: Cirrhochrista
- Species: C. cydippealis

Binomial name
- Cirrhochrista cydippealis (Walker, 1859)

Synonyms
- Endotricha cydippealis Walker, 1859

Species of moth

Cirrhochrista cydippealis is a moth in the family Crambidae. It was described by Francis Walker in 1859 and it is found on Borneo.

The forewings are white with a cinereous-brown exterior border. The interior and exterior lines are brown.
