= Perixera obrinaria =

Scientific classification
- Kingdom: Animalia
- Phylum: Arthropoda
- Class: Insecta
- Order: Lepidoptera
- Family: Geometridae
- Genus: Perixera
- Species: P. obrinaria

Binomial name
- Perixera obrinaria (Guenée, 1858)

Synonyms
- Anisodes obrinaria Guenée, 1858

Species of moth

Perixera obrinaria is a moth of the family Geometridae.
