= Cirrhochrista caconalis =

Scientific classification
- Kingdom: Animalia
- Phylum: Arthropoda
- Class: Insecta
- Order: Lepidoptera
- Family: Crambidae
- Genus: Cirrhochrista
- Species: C. caconalis

Binomial name
- Cirrhochrista caconalis C. Swinhoe, 1900

Species of moth

Cirrhochrista caconalis is a moth in the family Crambidae first described by Charles Swinhoe in 1900. It is found in Australia, where it has been recorded from Queensland.
