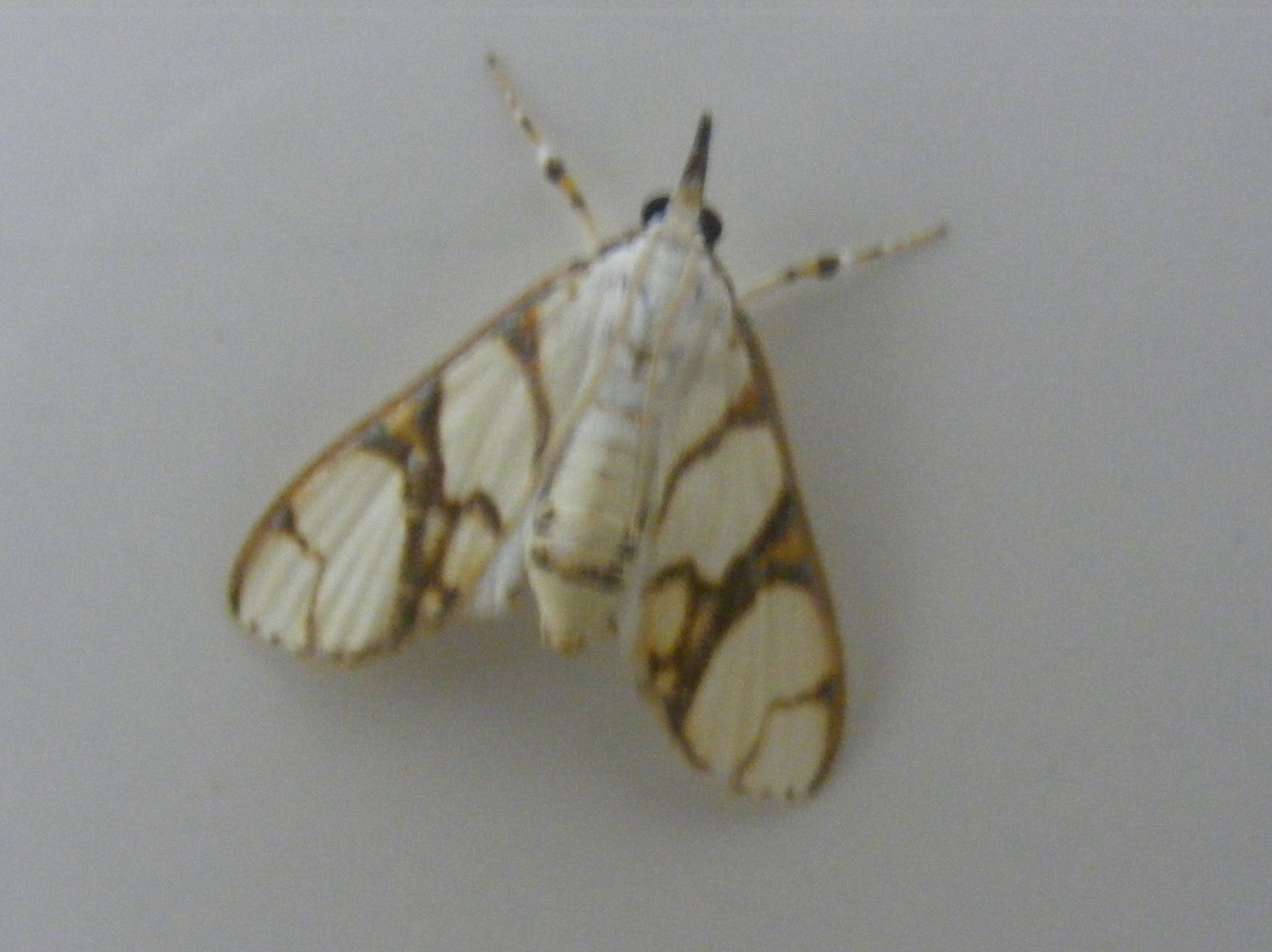

Scientific classification
- Kingdom: Animalia
- Phylum: Arthropoda
- Class: Insecta
- Order: Lepidoptera
- Family: Crambidae
- Genus: Cirrhochrista
- Species: C. fumipalpis

Binomial name
- Cirrhochrista fumipalpis C. Felder, R. Felder & Rogenhofer, 1875

= Cirrhochrista fumipalpis =

Species of moth

Cirrhochrista fumipalpis is a moth in the family Crambidae. It was described by Cajetan Felder, Rudolf Felder and Alois Friedrich Rogenhofer in 1875. It is found on the Moluccas.
