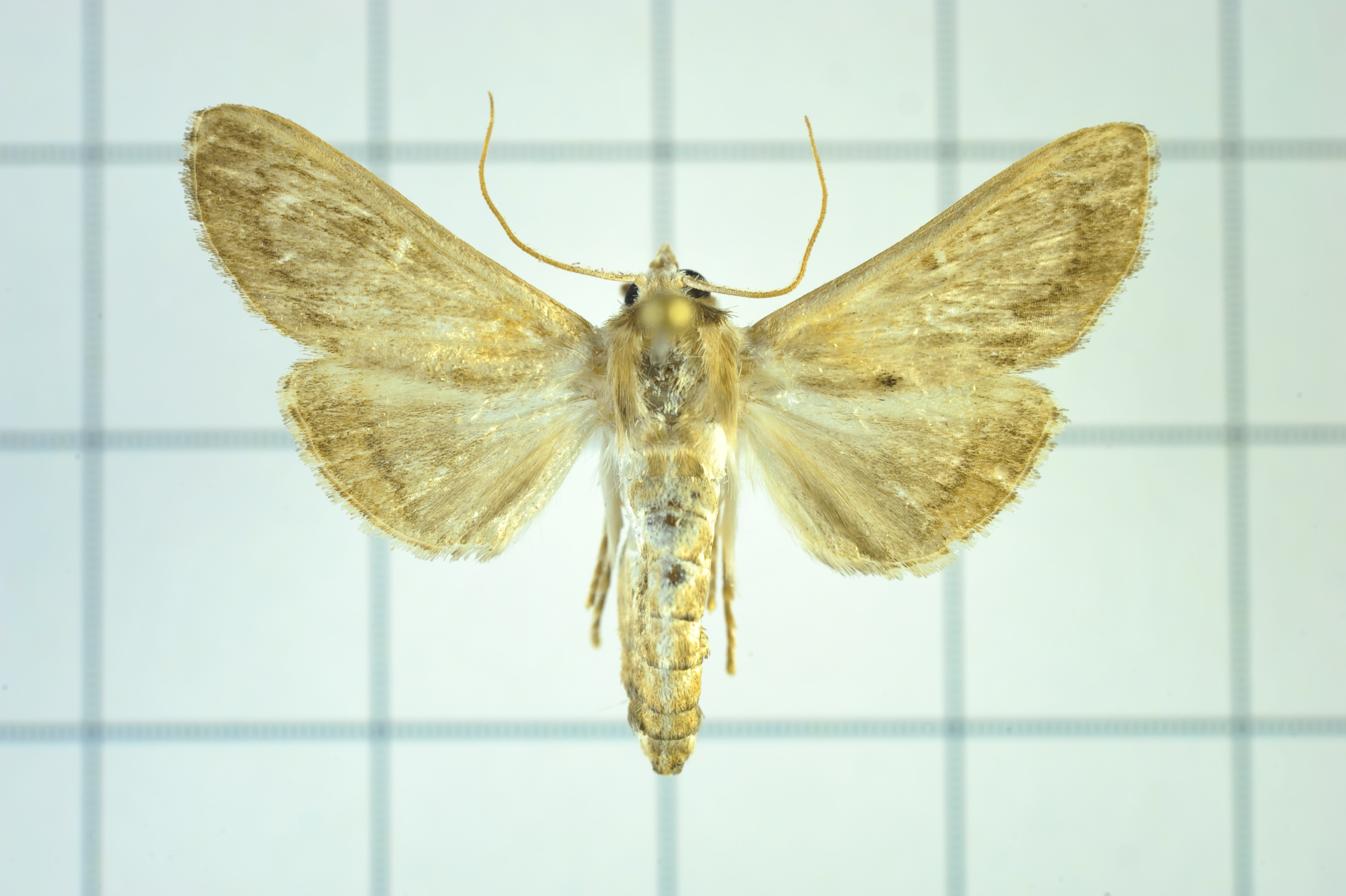

Scientific classification
- Kingdom: Animalia
- Phylum: Arthropoda
- Class: Insecta
- Order: Lepidoptera
- Family: Crambidae
- Genus: Cirrhochrista
- Species: C. spissalis

Binomial name
- Cirrhochrista spissalis (Guenée, 1854)

Synonyms
- Botys spissalis Guenée, 1854

= Cirrhochrista spissalis =

Species of moth

Cirrhochrista spissalis is a moth in the family Crambidae. It was described by Achille Guenée in 1854. It is found on Java and in Japan and Taiwan.
