= Cirrhochrista mnesidora =

Scientific classification
- Kingdom: Animalia
- Phylum: Arthropoda
- Class: Insecta
- Order: Lepidoptera
- Family: Crambidae
- Genus: Cirrhochrista
- Species: C. mnesidora

Binomial name
- Cirrhochrista mnesidora (Meyrick, 1894)

Synonyms
- Scirpophaga mnesidora Meyrick, 1894

Species of moth

Cirrhochrista mnesidora is a moth in the family Crambidae. It is found on Java.
