= Cirrhochrista oxylalis =

Scientific classification
- Kingdom: Animalia
- Phylum: Arthropoda
- Class: Insecta
- Order: Lepidoptera
- Family: Crambidae
- Genus: Cirrhochrista
- Species: C. oxylalis

Binomial name
- Cirrhochrista oxylalis Viette, 1961

Species of moth

Cirrhochrista oxylalis is a moth in the family Crambidae. It was described by Viette in 1961. It is found in Madagascar.
