= Cirrhochrista aurantialis =

Scientific classification
- Kingdom: Animalia
- Phylum: Arthropoda
- Class: Insecta
- Order: Lepidoptera
- Family: Crambidae
- Genus: Cirrhochrista
- Species: C. aurantialis

Binomial name
- Cirrhochrista aurantialis Hampson, 1919

Species of moth

Cirrhochrista aurantialis is a moth in the family Crambidae. It is found on Ambon Island.

The wingspan is about 26 mm. The forewings are orange-yellow with silver markings. The base of the costa is streaked with silver and fuscous. The hindwings are white, but yellowish towards the outer margin.
