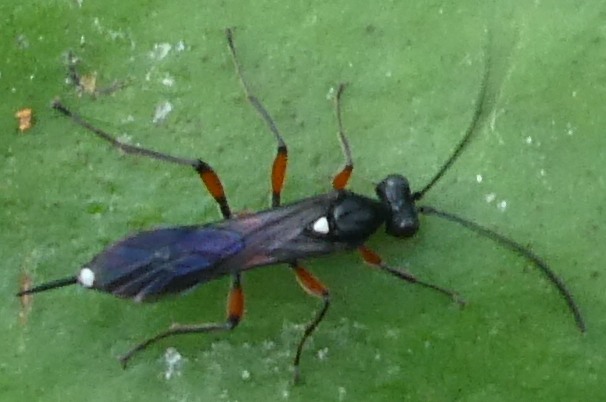

Scientific classification
- Kingdom: Animalia
- Phylum: Arthropoda
- Class: Insecta
- Order: Hymenoptera
- Family: Ichneumonidae
- Genus: Apsilops
- Species: A. hirtifrons

Binomial name
- Apsilops hirtifrons (Ashmead, 1896)

Synonyms
- Cryptus cyaniventris Riley, 1890; Cryptus hirtifrons Ashmead, 1896

= Apsilops hirtifrons =

Species of wasp

Apsilops hirtifrons is a species of ichneumon wasp in the family Ichneumonidae.
