= Chasmina fasciculosa =

Scientific classification
- Kingdom: Animalia
- Phylum: Arthropoda
- Class: Insecta
- Order: Lepidoptera
- Superfamily: Noctuoidea
- Family: Noctuidae
- Genus: Chasmina
- Species: C. fasciculosa

Binomial name
- Chasmina fasciculosa (Walker, 1858)

Synonyms
- Acontia fasciculosa Walker, 1858; Calesia cirrus Felder & Rogenhofer, 1874; Clinophlebia dasyptera Chen, 1982

Species of moth

Chasmina fasciculosa is a moth of the family Noctuidae first described by Francis Walker in 1858. It is found in Sri Lanka, Hong Kong, the Philippines and China.
