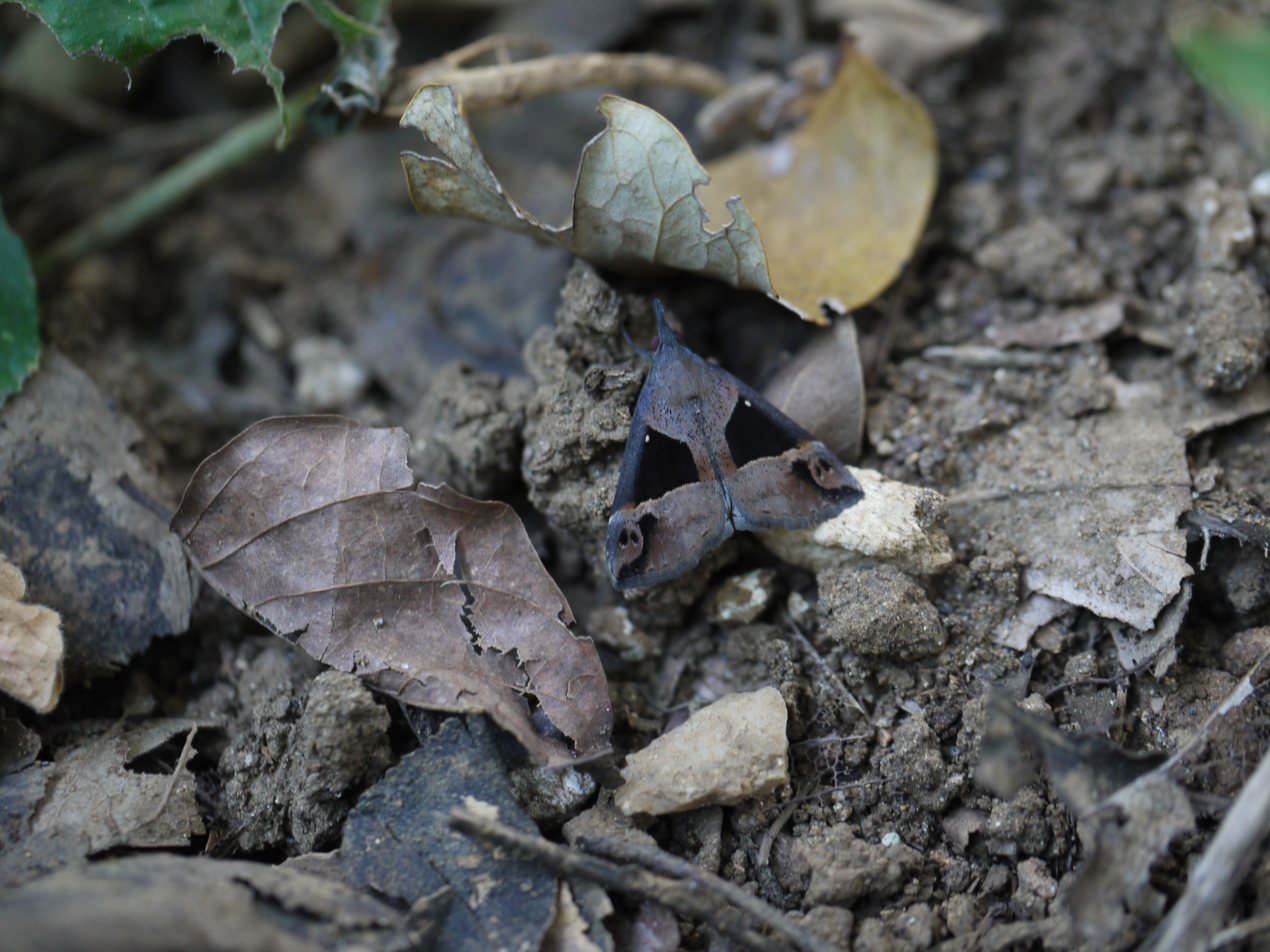

Scientific classification
- Domain: Eukaryota
- Kingdom: Animalia
- Phylum: Arthropoda
- Class: Insecta
- Order: Lepidoptera
- Superfamily: Noctuoidea
- Family: Erebidae
- Genus: Dichromia
- Species: D. pullata

Binomial name
- Dichromia pullata Moore, 1885

= Dichromia pullata =

Species of moth

Dichromia pullata is a moth of the family Erebidae first described by Frederic Moore in 1885. It is found in Sri Lanka and India.

Adult wingspan is 34 mm. Palpi roughly scaled with long and porrect (extending forward) second joint. Third joint obliquely upturned. Head, thorax, abdomen and wings are black brown. Basal patch and fascia of the forewing dark blackish brown. There is a large sub-triangular black patch with pale edges on the medial area. A white speck found in the cell. Postmedial line is straighter with some white marginal specks. Hindwings whitish with apical black are. Costa and inner areas blackish.
