= Cirrhochrista minuta =

Scientific classification
- Kingdom: Animalia
- Phylum: Arthropoda
- Class: Insecta
- Order: Lepidoptera
- Family: Crambidae
- Genus: Cirrhochrista
- Species: C. minuta

Binomial name
- Cirrhochrista minuta C. Swinhoe, 1902

Species of moth

Cirrhochrista minuta is a moth in the family Crambidae first described by Charles Swinhoe in 1902. It is found in Malaysia.
