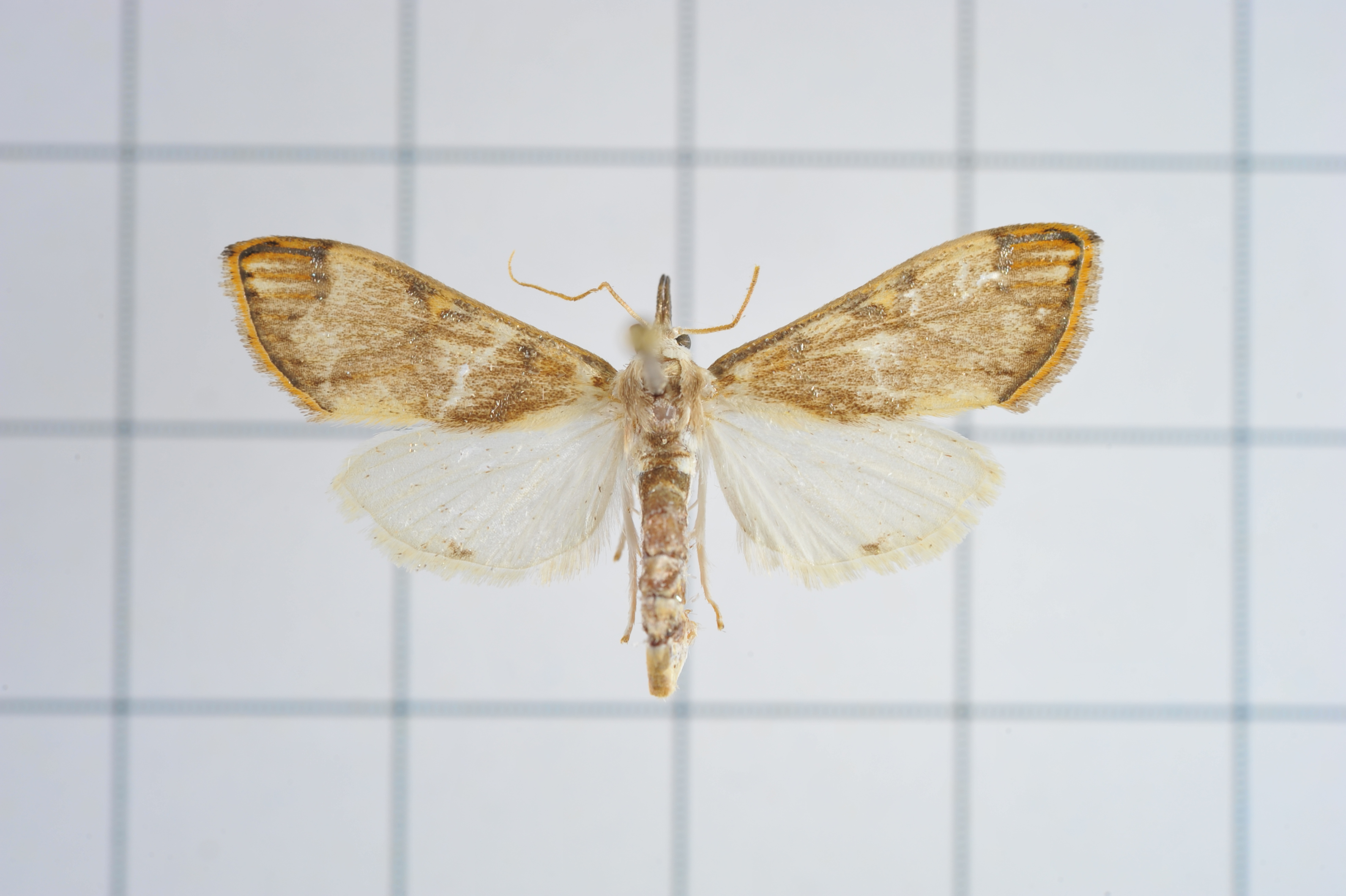

Scientific classification
- Kingdom: Animalia
- Phylum: Arthropoda
- Clade: Pancrustacea
- Class: Insecta
- Order: Lepidoptera
- Family: Crambidae
- Genus: Cirrhochrista
- Species: C. fuscusa

Binomial name
- Cirrhochrista fuscusa Chen, Song & Wu, 2006

= Cirrhochrista fuscusa =

Species of moth

Cirrhochrista fuscusa is a moth in the family Crambidae. It was described by Fu-Qiang Chen, Shi-Mei Song and Chun-Sheng Wu in 2006. It is only found in Taiwan. This genus is extensively distributed in tropical and subtropical Africa, throughout tropical Asia to China, Japan, India, Madagascar and Australia.
