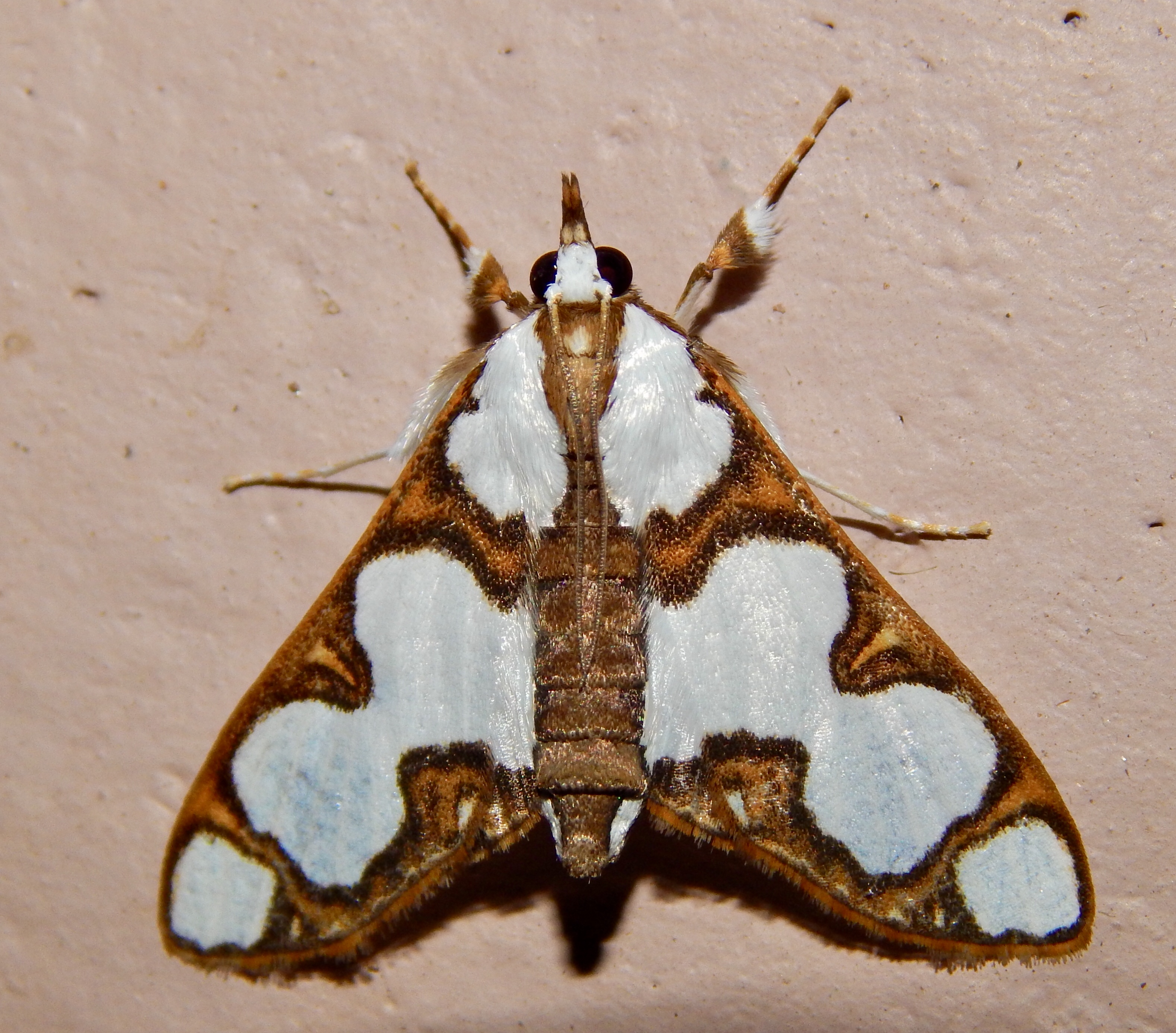
- from Western Ghats of India

Scientific classification
- Kingdom: Animalia
- Phylum: Arthropoda
- Class: Insecta
- Order: Lepidoptera
- Family: Crambidae
- Genus: Cirrhochrista
- Species: C. pulchellalis

Binomial name
- Cirrhochrista pulchellalis Lederer, 1863

= Cirrhochrista pulchellalis =

Species of moth

Cirrhochrista pulchellalis is a moth in the family Crambidae. It was described by Julius Lederer in 1863. It is found on Ambon Island, Java and Sri Lanka.

== Description ==
Its wingspan is about 30 mm. Palpi projecting about the length of head and with a tuft of porrect (forward extending) hair from first joint. A white moth, with fulvous palpi, antennae, collar and shoulders. Abdomen with dorsal maculate (spotted) band, the spots on first two segments small, then very large. Forewings with fulvous costa. An outwardly oblique dark-edged fulvous antemedial band expanding on inner margin. A dark-edged triangular fulvous patch from middle of costa extending to lower angle of cell. There is an oblique fulvous dark-edged band across the apex. A fulvous and dark marginal band with sinuous inner edge and expanding into a large patch at outer angle. Hindwings with dark marginal band and the cilia orange between veins 6 and 2.
