= Cirrhochrista cyclophora =

Scientific classification
- Kingdom: Animalia
- Phylum: Arthropoda
- Class: Insecta
- Order: Lepidoptera
- Family: Crambidae
- Genus: Cirrhochrista
- Species: C. cyclophora

Binomial name
- Cirrhochrista cyclophora Lower, 1903

Species of moth

Cirrhochrista cyclophora is a moth in the family Crambidae. It was described by Oswald Bertram Lower in 1903 and it is found in Australia.
