= Cirrhochrista grabczewskyi =

Scientific classification
- Kingdom: Animalia
- Phylum: Arthropoda
- Class: Insecta
- Order: Lepidoptera
- Family: Crambidae
- Genus: Cirrhochrista
- Species: C. grabczewskyi

Binomial name
- Cirrhochrista grabczewskyi E. Hering, 1903

Synonyms
- Cirrhochrista conjuncta Gaede, 1917; Cirrhochrista convoluta Hampson, 1919

Species of moth

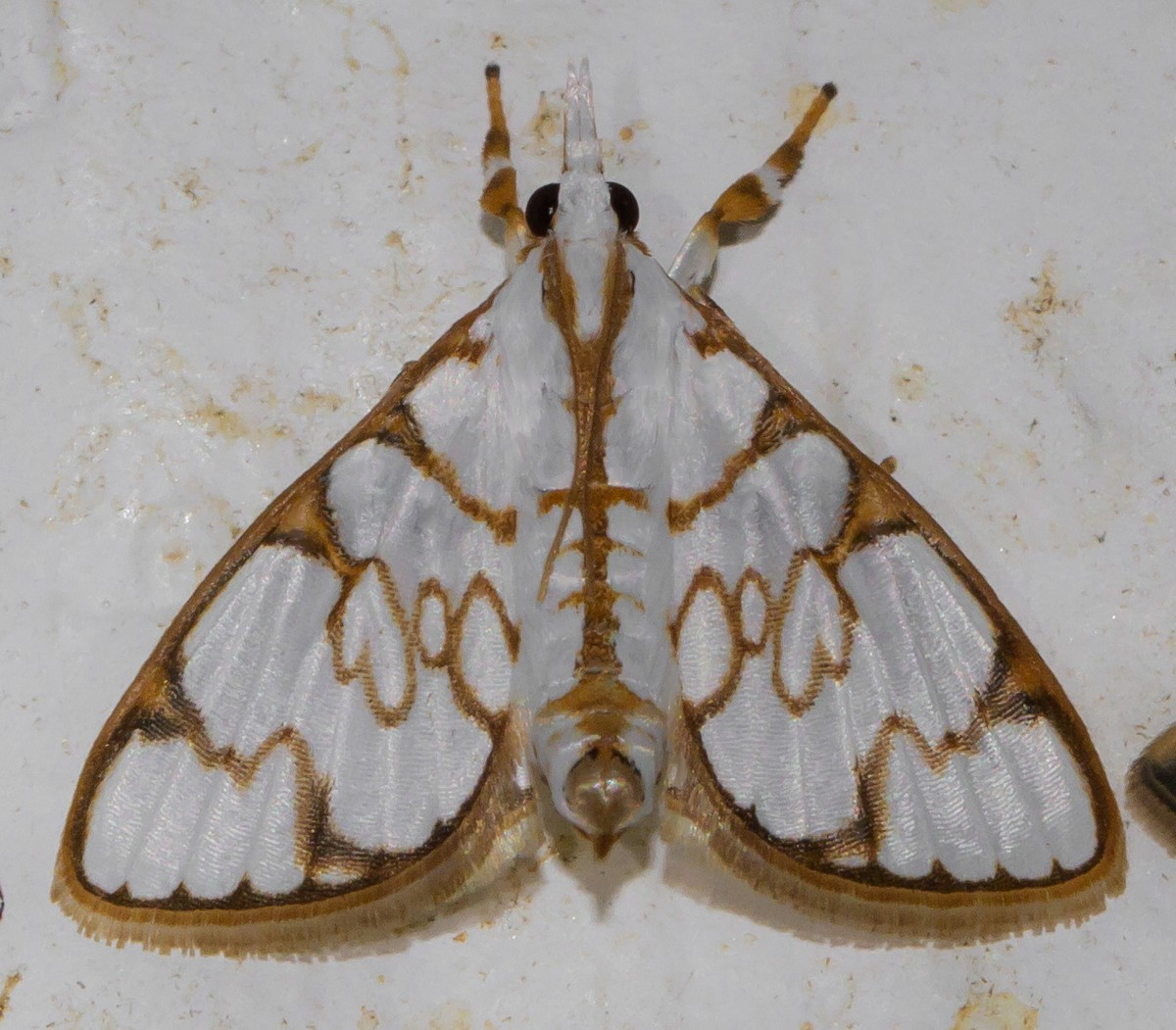

Cirrhochrista grabczewskyi is a moth of the family Crambidae. It is found in subtropical Africa from Senegal to Kenya, and is also known from Zimbabwe and South Africa.

It has a wingspan of 24–30 mm.

== See also ==
- Original description: Hering, Ed. 1903, "Neue Pyraliden aus dem tropischen Faunengebiet". Entomologische Zeitung 64 (1) p. 109, Stettin. via Internet Archive.
