= Dichromia cognata =

Scientific classification
- Domain: Eukaryota
- Kingdom: Animalia
- Phylum: Arthropoda
- Class: Insecta
- Order: Lepidoptera
- Superfamily: Noctuoidea
- Family: Erebidae
- Genus: Dichromia
- Species: D. cognata

Binomial name
- Dichromia cognata (Moore, [1885])

Synonyms
- Hypena cognata Moore, [1885]; Bomolocha tanis C. Swinhoe, 1917

Species of moth

Dichromia cognata is a moth of the family Erebidae first described by Frederic Moore in 1885. It is found in Sri Lanka, India, Hainan, Borneo, New Guinea, Bismarck Islands, Solomon Islands and Vanuatu.

Male antennae have long cilia. In male genitalia, valves and saccus are long. Uncus more strongly curved.
