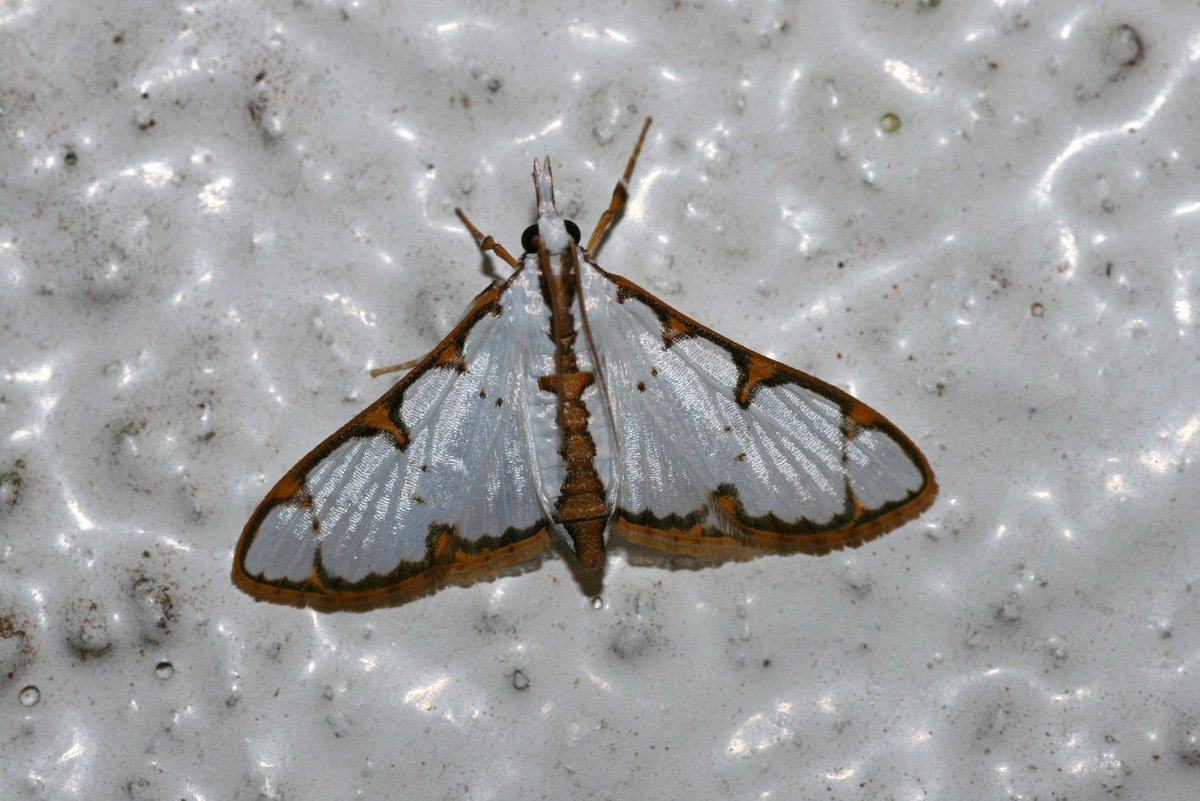

Scientific classification
- Kingdom: Animalia
- Phylum: Arthropoda
- Class: Insecta
- Order: Lepidoptera
- Family: Crambidae
- Genus: Cirrhochrista
- Species: C. brizoalis

Binomial name
- Cirrhochrista brizoalis (Walker, 1859)

Synonyms
- Margaronia brizoalis Walker, 1859; Cirrochrista aetherialis Lederer, 1863; Cirrochrista bryozalis Moore, 1882; Cirrochrista brizonalis Meyrick 1884

= Cirrhochrista brizoalis =

Species of moth

Cirrhochrista brizoalis is a species of moth in the family Crambidae described by Francis Walker in 1859. It is found across south and south-east Asia from India to Taiwan and in New Guinea and Australia.
