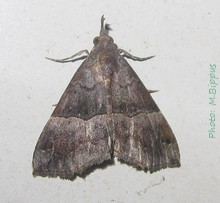

Scientific classification
- Domain: Eukaryota
- Kingdom: Animalia
- Phylum: Arthropoda
- Class: Insecta
- Order: Lepidoptera
- Superfamily: Noctuoidea
- Family: Erebidae
- Genus: Dichromia
- Species: D. legrosi

Binomial name
- Dichromia legrosi (Guillermet, 1992)

Synonyms
- Hypena legrosi Guillermet, 1992

= Dichromia legrosi =

Species of moth

Dichromia legrosi is a moth of the family Erebidae first described by Christian Guillermet in 1992. It is found on Réunion.

A host plant of this species is in the family Urticaceae and genus Boehmeria.
