= Cirrhochrista diploschalis =

Scientific classification
- Kingdom: Animalia
- Phylum: Arthropoda
- Class: Insecta
- Order: Lepidoptera
- Family: Crambidae
- Genus: Cirrhochrista
- Species: C. diploschalis

Binomial name
- Cirrhochrista diploschalis Hampson, 1919

Species of moth

Cirrhochrista diploschalis is a moth in the family Crambidae. It is found in Papua New Guinea, on the D'Entrecasteaux Islands (Fergusson Island).

The wingspan is about 26 mm. The forewings are silvery white, the costa suffused with orange-yellow and with a streak of silvery and dark brown scales at the basal area. There is an orange-yellow antemedial band and dark red-brown medial and postmedial lines. The hindwings are silvery white, tinged with yellow at the termen.
