= Cirrhochrista mulleralis =

Scientific classification
- Kingdom: Animalia
- Phylum: Arthropoda
- Class: Insecta
- Order: Lepidoptera
- Family: Crambidae
- Genus: Cirrhochrista
- Species: C. mulleralis

Binomial name
- Cirrhochrista mulleralis Legrand, 1957

Species of moth

Cirrhochrista mulleralis is a moth in the family Crambidae. It was described by Henry Legrand in 1957. It is found on the Seychelles, where it has been recorded from Mahé, Praslin, North and Silhouette.
