= Cirrhochrista poecilocygnalis =

Scientific classification
- Kingdom: Animalia
- Phylum: Arthropoda
- Class: Insecta
- Order: Lepidoptera
- Family: Crambidae
- Genus: Cirrhochrista
- Species: C. poecilocygnalis

Binomial name
- Cirrhochrista poecilocygnalis Strand, 1915

Species of moth

Cirrhochrista poecilocygnalis is a moth in the family Crambidae. It was described by Strand in 1915. It is found in Cameroon.
