= Cirrhochrista trilinealis =

Scientific classification
- Kingdom: Animalia
- Phylum: Arthropoda
- Class: Insecta
- Order: Lepidoptera
- Family: Crambidae
- Genus: Cirrhochrista
- Species: C. trilinealis

Binomial name
- Cirrhochrista trilinealis Pagenstecher, 1900

Species of moth

Cirrhochrista trilinealis is a moth in the family Crambidae. It is found in Papua New Guinea.
