= Cirrhochrista primulina =

Scientific classification
- Kingdom: Animalia
- Phylum: Arthropoda
- Class: Insecta
- Order: Lepidoptera
- Family: Crambidae
- Genus: Cirrhochrista
- Species: C. primulina

Binomial name
- Cirrhochrista primulina Hampson, 1919

Species of moth

Cirrhochrista primulina is a moth in the family Crambidae. It is found in New Guinea.

The wingspan is about 26 mm. The forewings are white, suffused with yellow-buff. The costa is deeper yellow up to the middle and there is a dark red-brown and silvery streak beneath it. The antemedial band, medial and postmedial lines are red-brown and silvery. The hindwings are silvery white.
