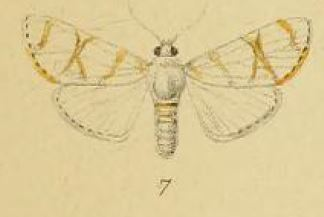

Scientific classification
- Kingdom: Animalia
- Phylum: Arthropoda
- Class: Insecta
- Order: Lepidoptera
- Family: Crambidae
- Genus: Cirrhochrista
- Species: C. saltusalis

Binomial name
- Cirrhochrista saltusalis Schaus in Schaus & Clements, 1893

= Cirrhochrista saltusalis =

Species of moth

Cirrhochrista saltusalis is a moth of the family Crambidae described by William Schaus in 1893. It is found in the Democratic Republic of the Congo, Cameroon and in Sierra Leone.
