= Cirrhochrista nivea =

Scientific classification
- Kingdom: Animalia
- Phylum: Arthropoda
- Class: Insecta
- Order: Lepidoptera
- Family: Crambidae
- Genus: Cirrhochrista
- Species: C. nivea

Binomial name
- Cirrhochrista nivea (de Joannis, 1932)

Synonyms
- Ancalidia nivea de Joannis, 1932; Ancalidia nivae Błeszyński & Collins, 1962

Species of moth

Cirrhochrista nivea is a moth in the family Crambidae. It was described by Joseph de Joannis in 1932. It is found on Mauritius.
