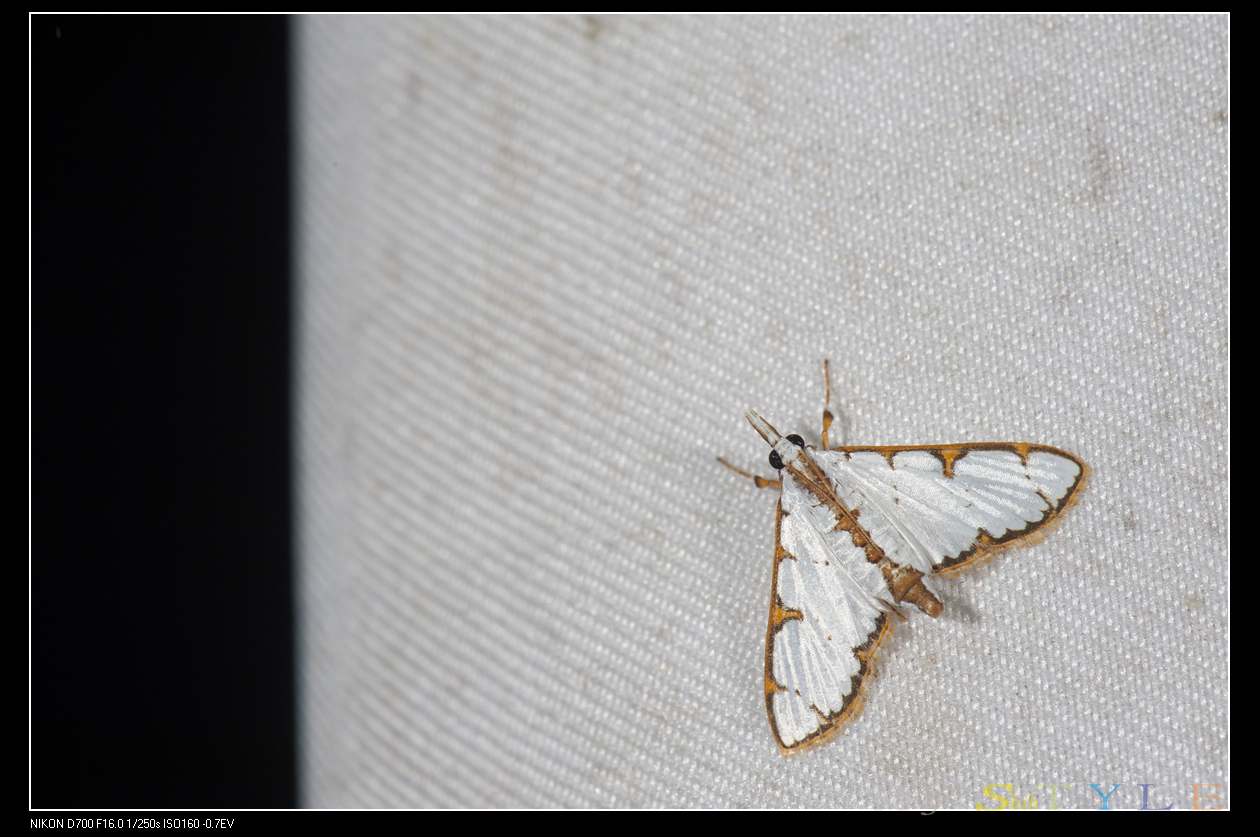

Scientific classification
- Kingdom: Animalia
- Phylum: Arthropoda
- Clade: Pancrustacea
- Class: Insecta
- Order: Lepidoptera
- Family: Crambidae
- Genus: Cirrhochrista
- Species: C. spinuella

Binomial name
- Cirrhochrista spinuella Chen, Song & Wu, 2006

= Cirrhochrista spinuella =

Species of moth

Cirrhochrista spinuella is a moth in the family Crambidae. It was described by Fu-Qiang Chen, Shi-Mei Song and Chun-Sheng Wu in 2006. It is found in Guangdong, China.
