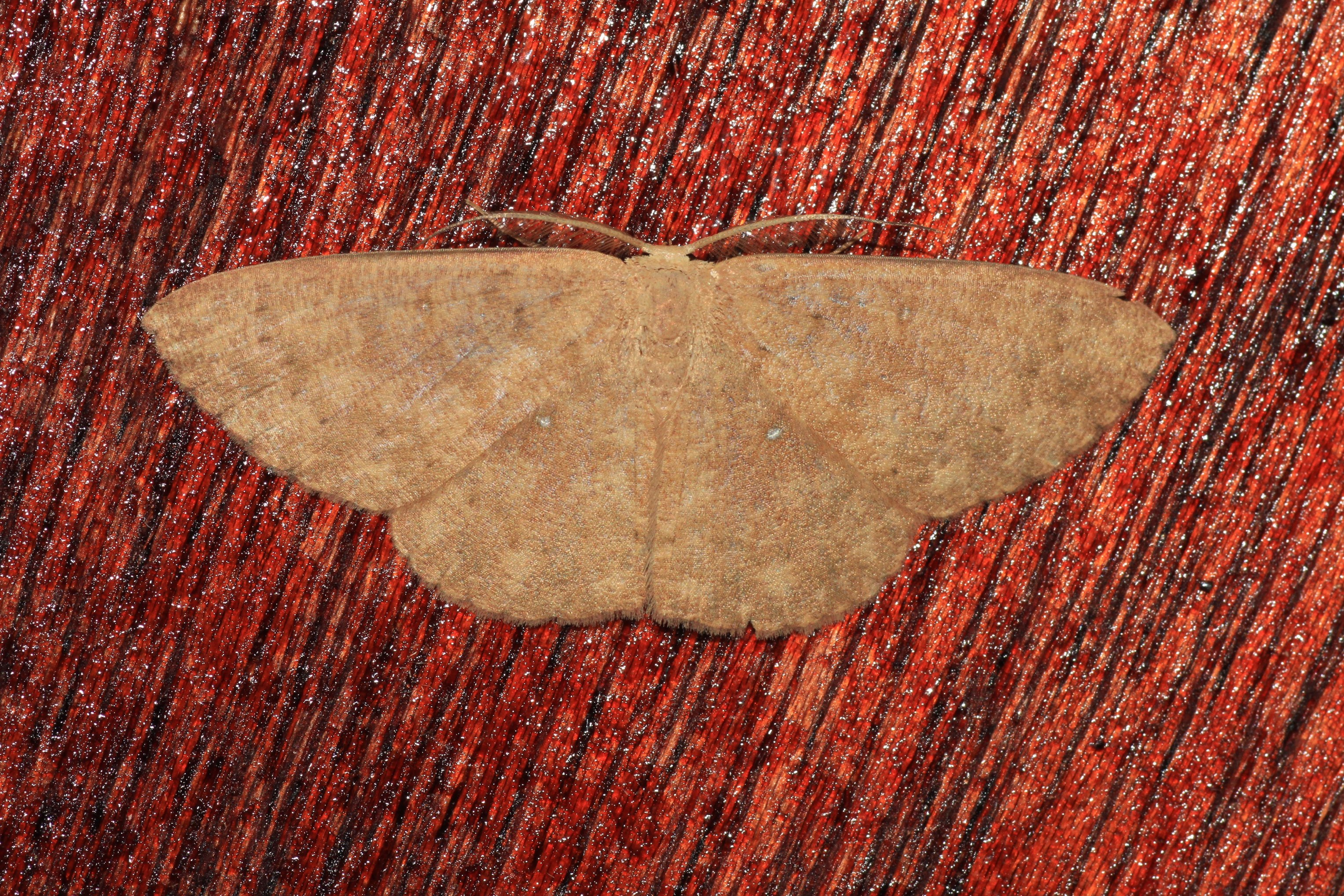

Scientific classification
- Kingdom: Animalia
- Phylum: Arthropoda
- Class: Insecta
- Order: Lepidoptera
- Family: Geometridae
- Genus: Perixera
- Species: P. absconditaria

Binomial name
- Perixera absconditaria (Walker, 1862)

Synonyms
- Anisodes absconditaria Walker, 1862

= Perixera absconditaria =

Species of moth

Perixera absconditaria is a moth of the family Geometridae first described by Francis Walker in 1862. It is found in the Indian subregion, Sri Lanka, to Taiwan, Sundaland and the Philippines.

It is a pale brownish moth. Two white spots can be seen in the middle of the hindwings. The caterpillar is known to feed on Cinnamomum species.

Two subspecies are recognized.

- Perixera absconditaria assamica Prout, 1938
- Perixera absconditaria conjectata Prout, 1938
