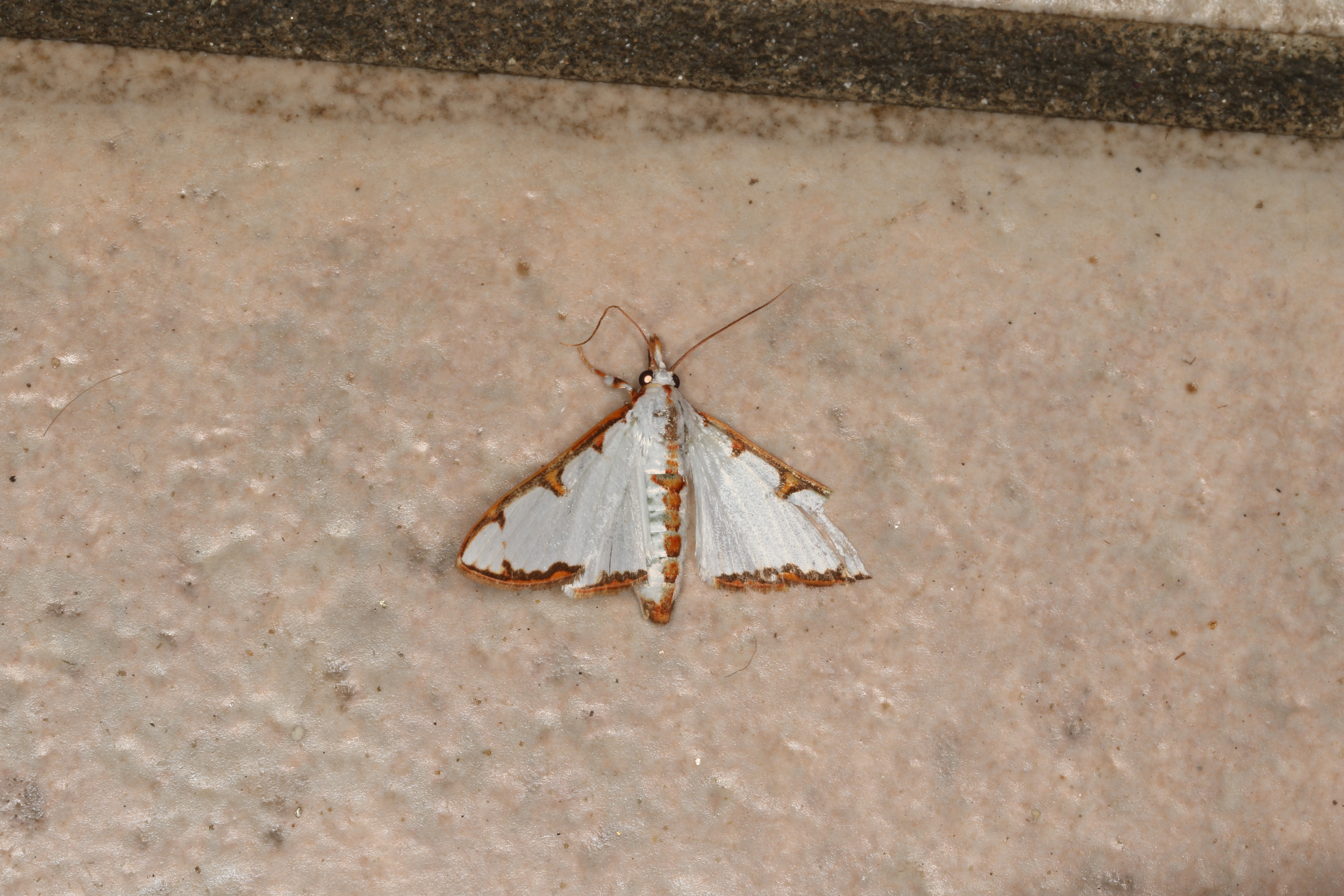
- Cirrhochrista arcusalis

Scientific classification
- Kingdom: Animalia
- Phylum: Arthropoda
- Class: Insecta
- Order: Lepidoptera
- Family: Crambidae
- Genus: Cirrhochrista
- Species: C. arcusalis

Binomial name
- Cirrhochrista arcusalis (Walker, 1859)

Synonyms
- Margaronia arcusalis Walker, 1859; Cirrhochrista rauma Swinhoe, 1900

= Cirrhochrista arcusalis =

Species of moth

Cirrhochrista arcusalis is a moth in the family Crambidae. It is found in Australia, where it has been recorded from coastal Queensland and New South Wales.
