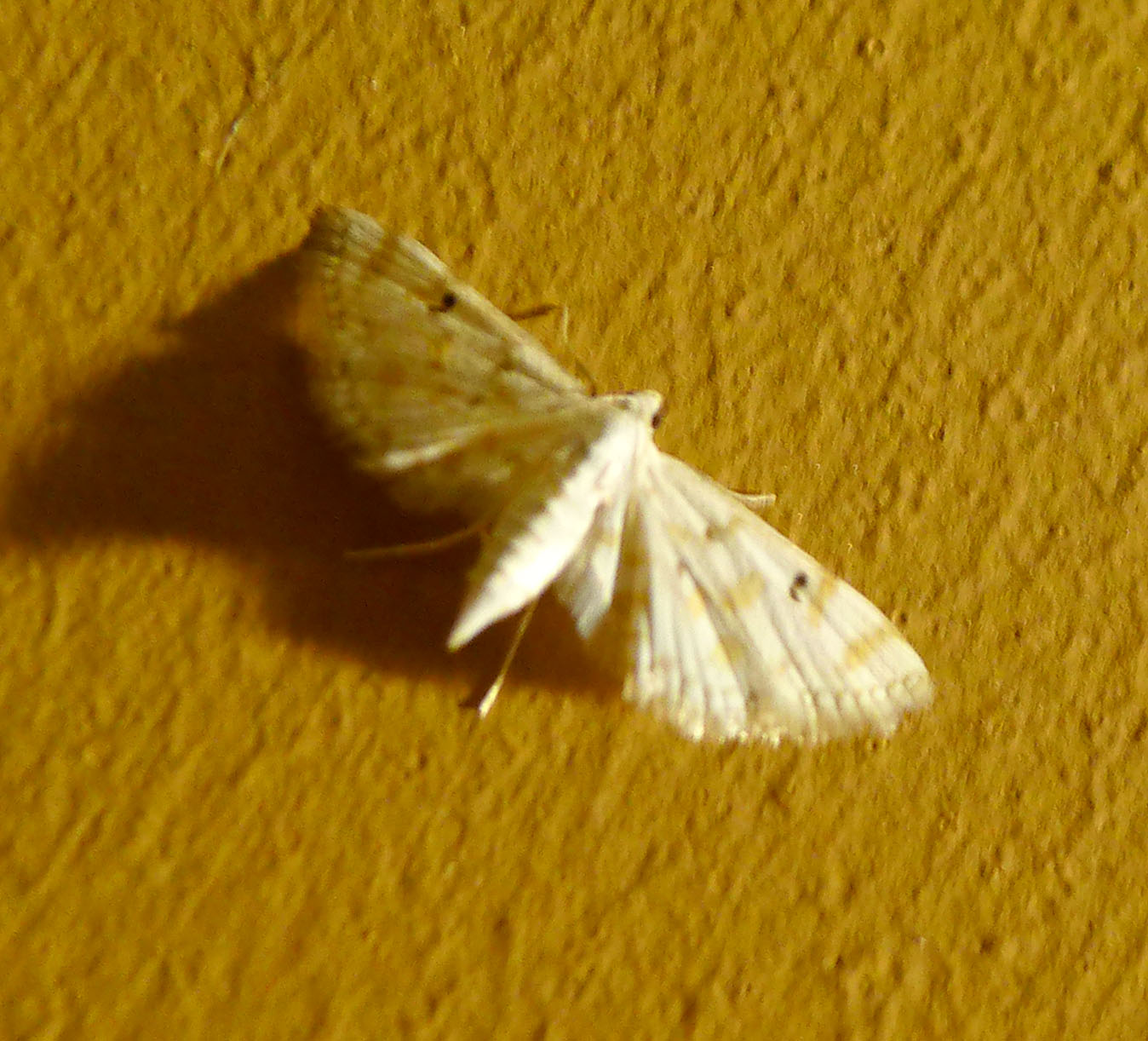

Scientific classification
- Kingdom: Animalia
- Phylum: Arthropoda
- Clade: Pancrustacea
- Class: Insecta
- Order: Lepidoptera
- Family: Crambidae
- Genus: Parapoynx
- Species: P. stagnalis

Binomial name
- Parapoynx stagnalis (Zeller, 1852)

Synonyms
- Nymphula stagnalis Zeller, 1852; Cataclysta vestigialis Snellen, 1880; Hydrocampa depunctalis Guenée, 1854; Hydrocampa hilli Tepper, 1890; Nymphula depunctalis Guenée, 1854; Zebronia decussalis Walker, 1859

= Parapoynx stagnalis =

Species of moth

Parapoynx stagnalis, the rice case bearer or rice caseworm, is a species of moth in the family Crambidae. It has a wide distribution and is found in India, Sri Lanka, South-East Asia, South Africa, South America, southern Europe (Spain and Greece), Russia and Australia (the Northern Territory and Queensland).

== Description ==
The life cycle is completed in about 35–40 days. The length of the forewings is 15 mm. Adult has whitish wings with pale brown wavy markings. There are two black comma-shaped marks on each forewing. Male can be identified by narrow and uniform abdomen, whereas female abdomen is widest at the middle but tapering posteriorly. Female usually lay 150 eggs and first instar larvae emerge after a week. Final larva emerge after 20 days, and reaches its maximum length of 10-12mm. The moth has six larval instars. Due to branched tubular gills, caterpillars can respire in aquatic media. Therefore, instar can disperse through water. Pupation occurs when the pupal case is attached to the leaf sheath above the water level. After a week of pupation, adult emerges.

== Ecology ==
As its common name implies, rice caseworm is one of the major pests of rice throughout the world. Larvae are the infective stage, where they cut leaf tips to make leaf cases. The infestation can be characterized by ladder-like skeletonized tissues in leaves. Larvae completely consume the leaf blade, where only mid rib is visible. Surrounding weeds are the secondary hosts for the moth.

== Control ==
Eggs of rice caseworm can be controlled by using snails. Larvae can be controlled by using many natural predators like water beetles of the families Hydrophilidae and Dytiscidae. Pupal stages can be eradicate by the introduction of Pediobius and Apsilops species. Adult moths are daily meal for many spiders, insect eating bird species and dragonflies. Other than biological methods, many traditional methods such as reducing the water level of paddy fields, crop rotation, crop sanitation, pruning, light traps and hand picking are also effective. Chemicals such as DDT, BHC or Carbaryl can be used in required concentrations.
