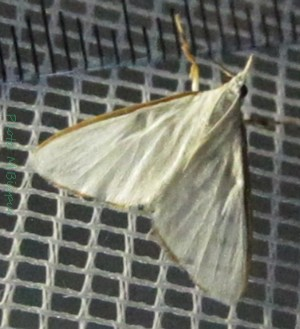

Scientific classification
- Kingdom: Animalia
- Phylum: Arthropoda
- Clade: Pancrustacea
- Class: Insecta
- Order: Lepidoptera
- Family: Crambidae
- Tribe: Margaroniini
- Genus: Cirrhochrista; Lederer, 1863

Synonyms
- Ancalidia de Joannis, 1932; Cirrochrista Warren, 1892; Eucallaenia Snellen, 1892; Margaronia Marumo, 1917; Pachybotys Warren, 1895

= Cirrhochrista =

Genus of moths

Cirrhochrista is a genus of moths of the family Crambidae described by Julius Lederer in 1863.

== Species ==
- Cirrhochrista annulifera Hampson, 1919
- Cirrhochrista arcusalis (Walker, 1859)
- Cirrhochrista argentiplaga Warren, 1897
- Cirrhochrista aurantialis Hampson, 1919
- Cirrhochrista bracteolalis Hampson, 1891
- Cirrhochrista brizoalis (Walker, 1859)
- Cirrhochrista caconalis C. Swinhoe, 1900
- Cirrhochrista cyclophora Lower, 1903
- Cirrhochrista cydippealis (Walker, 1859)
- Cirrhochrista cygnalis Pagenstecher, 1907
- Cirrhochrista diploschalis Hampson, 1919
- Cirrhochrista disparalis (Walker, 1865)
- Cirrhochrista etiennei (Viette, 1976)
- Cirrhochrista excavata Gaede, 1916
- Cirrhochrista fumipalpis (C. Felder, R. Felder & Rogenhofer, 1875)
- Cirrhochrista fuscusa Chen, Song & Wu, 2006
- Cirrhochrista grabczewskyi E. Hering, 1903
- Cirrhochrista griveaudalis Viette, 1961
- Cirrhochrista kosemponialis Strand, 1918
- Cirrhochrista metisalis Viette, 1961
- Cirrhochrista minuta C. Swinhoe, 1902
- Cirrhochrista mnesidora (Meyrick, 1894)
- Cirrhochrista mulleralis Legrand, 1957
- Cirrhochrista nivea (de Joannis, 1932)
- Cirrhochrista oxylalis Viette, 1961
- Cirrhochrista perbrunnealis T. B. Fletcher, 1910
- Cirrhochrista poecilocygnalis Strand, 1915
- Cirrhochrista primulina Hampson, 1919
- Cirrhochrista pulchellalis Lederer, 1863
- Cirrhochrista punctulata Hampson, 1896
- Cirrhochrista quinquemaculalis Strand, 1915
- Cirrhochrista saltusalis Schaus, 1893
- Cirrhochrista semibrunnea Hampson, 1896
- Cirrhochrista spinuella Chen, Song & Wu, 2006
- Cirrhochrista spissalis (Guenée, 1854)
- Cirrhochrista trilinealis Pagenstecher, 1900
- Cirrhochrista xanthographis Hampson, 1919
