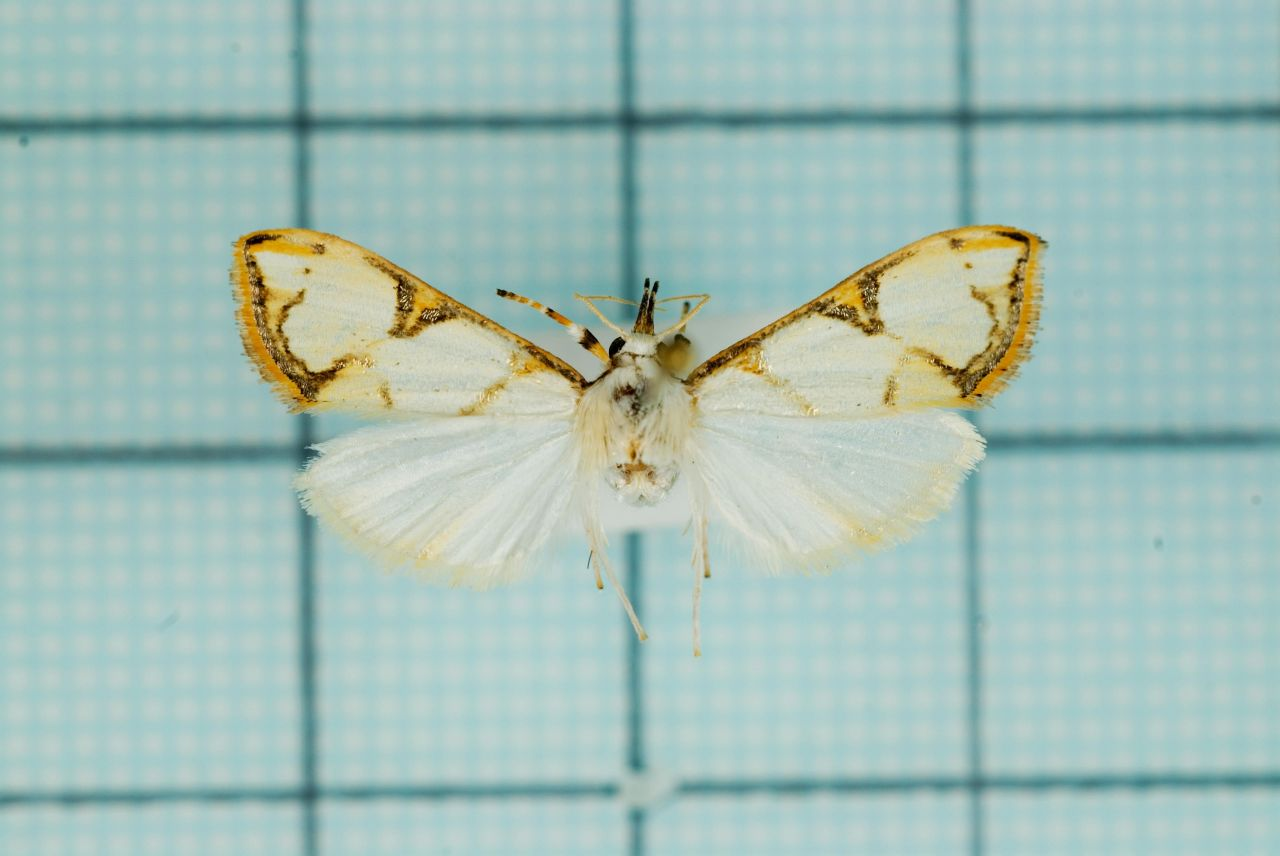
- Female
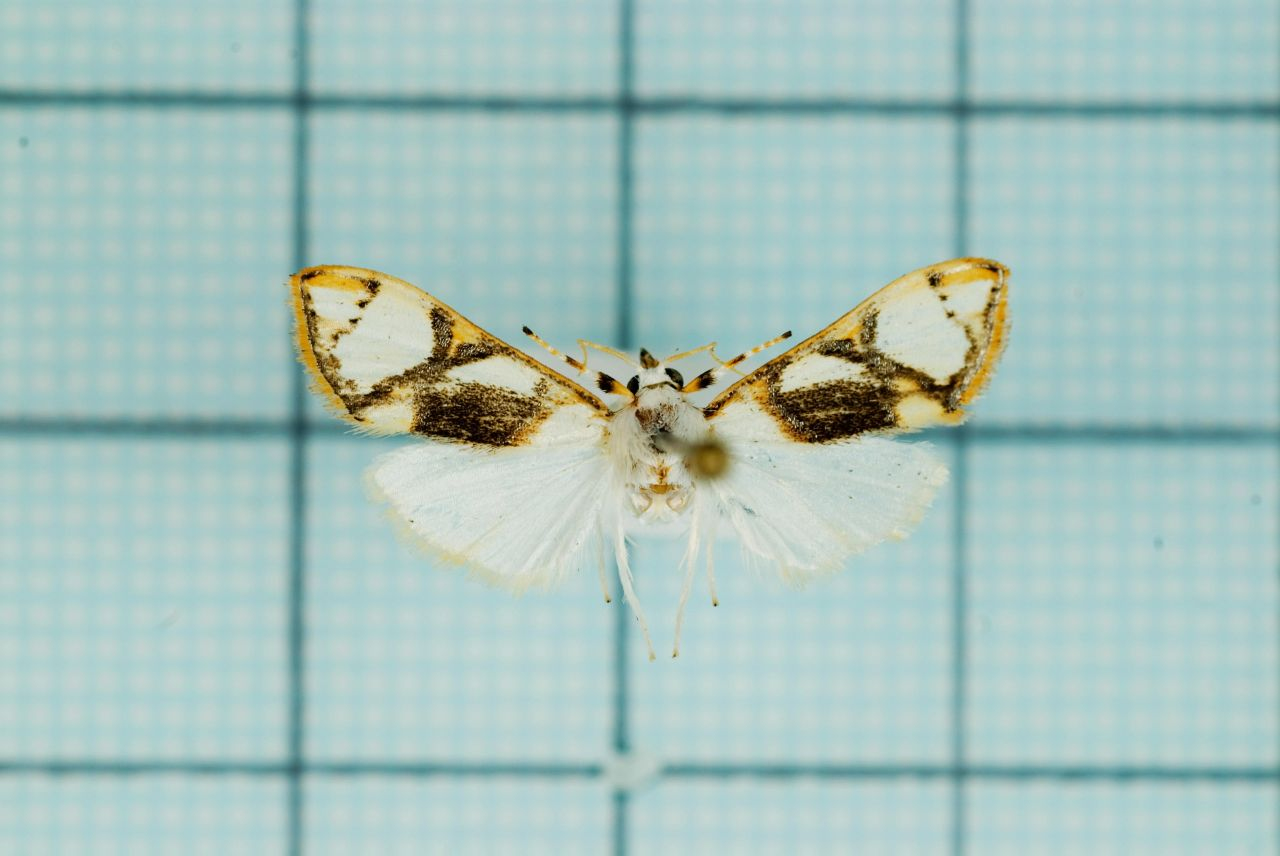
- Male

Scientific classification
- Kingdom: Animalia
- Phylum: Arthropoda
- Class: Insecta
- Order: Lepidoptera
- Family: Crambidae
- Genus: Cirrhochrista
- Species: C. bracteolalis

Binomial name
- Cirrhochrista bracteolalis Hampson, 1891

Synonyms
- Cirrhochrista kosemponialis ab. bracteolalis

= Cirrhochrista bracteolalis =

Species of moth

Cirrhochrista bracteolalis is a moth of the family Crambidae. It is found in China, Taiwan, India, the Philippines Sri Lanka and Cambodia.

== Description ==
The wingspan is 22–37 mm. Palpi projecting about twice the length of head and with no tuft from basal joint. Head and thorax whitish. Palpi and abdomen above fuscous colored. Forewings with white suffused with fuscous brown. A white patch found at base which is not reaching costa. There is a silvery fascia below costal base. An incurved silvery antemedial band and a silver spot found at upper angle of cell. A postmedial sinuous spot series. Three silvery spots found on apex. A marginal silver specks series can be seen. Hindwings whitish.
