= Cirrhochrista excavata =

Scientific classification
- Kingdom: Animalia
- Phylum: Arthropoda
- Class: Insecta
- Order: Lepidoptera
- Family: Crambidae
- Genus: Cirrhochrista
- Species: C. excavata

Binomial name
- Cirrhochrista excavata Gaede, 1916

Species of moth

Cirrhochrista excavata is a moth in the family Crambidae. It was described by Max Gaede in 1916. It is found in Cameroon.
