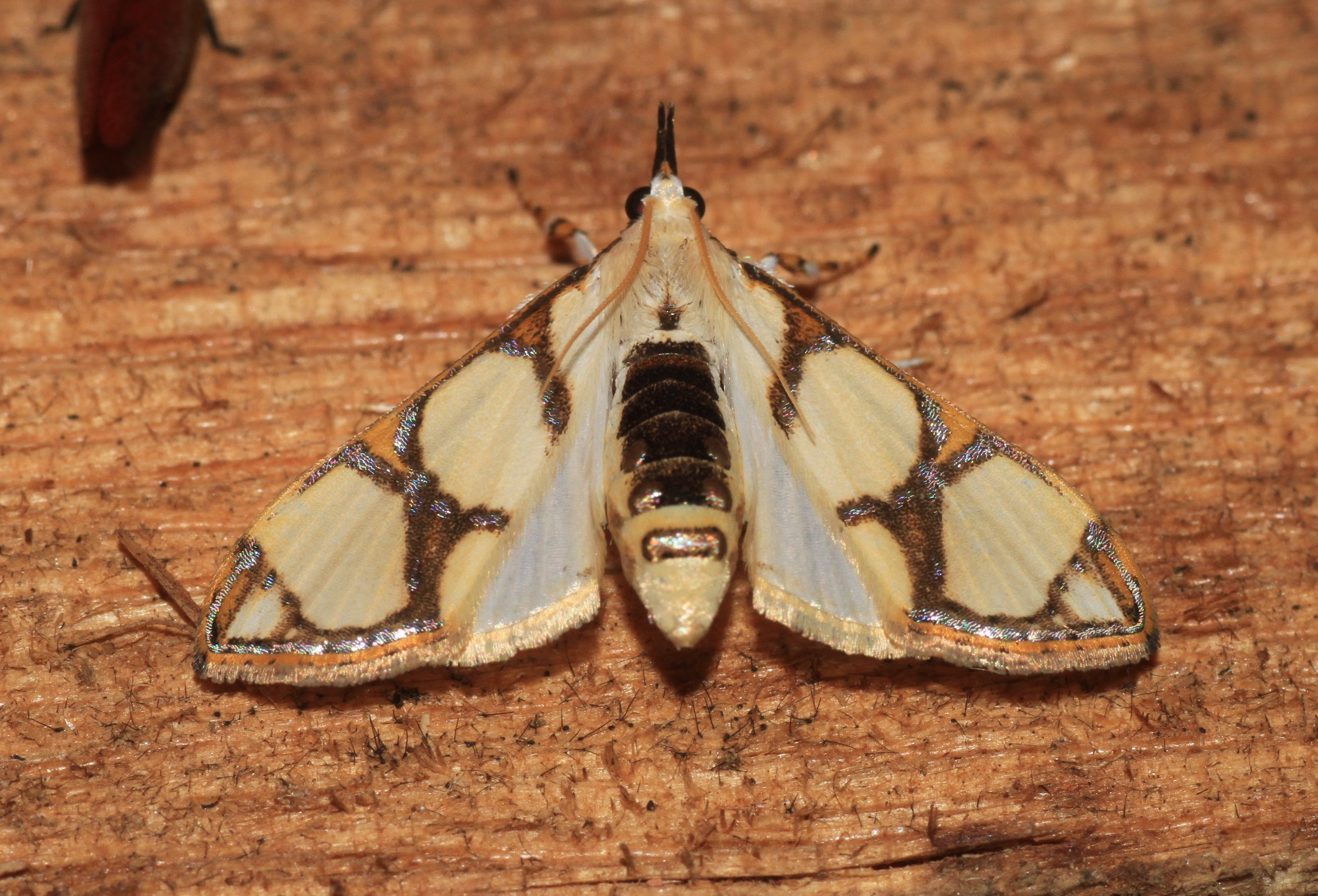

Scientific classification
- Kingdom: Animalia
- Phylum: Arthropoda
- Class: Insecta
- Order: Lepidoptera
- Family: Crambidae
- Genus: Cirrhochrista
- Species: C. kosemponialis

Binomial name
- Cirrhochrista kosemponialis Strand, 1918

Synonyms
- Cirrhochrista bifurcalis Hampson, 1919; Cirrhochrista kosemponalis Wang, 1980 (lapsus)

= Cirrhochrista kosemponialis =

Species of moth

Cirrhochrista kosemponialis is a moth in the family Crambidae. It was described by Embrik Strand in 1918. It is found in Taiwan and India (Khasi Hills).
