= Cirrhochrista semibrunnea =

Scientific classification
- Kingdom: Animalia
- Phylum: Arthropoda
- Clade: Pancrustacea
- Class: Insecta
- Order: Lepidoptera
- Family: Crambidae
- Genus: Cirrhochrista
- Species: C. semibrunnea

Binomial name
- Cirrhochrista semibrunnea Hampson, 1896

Species of moth

Cirrhochrista semibrunnea is a moth in the family Crambidae. It was described by George Hampson in 1896. It is found in Bhutan and India.

The wingspan is about 36 mm. The forewings are brown, with a large white patch on the basal inner area, as well as a white crescent in the cell and a larger similar mark beyond the cell. There is also a quadrate apical white patch, a yellow discocellular line and a series of yellow marginal marks below the apical patch. The hindwings are white with a large brown submarginal spot and some yellow on the medial part of the margin, as well as a brown marginal line.
