= Cirrhochrista cygnalis =

Scientific classification
- Kingdom: Animalia
- Phylum: Arthropoda
- Class: Insecta
- Order: Lepidoptera
- Family: Crambidae
- Genus: Cirrhochrista
- Species: C. cygnalis

Binomial name
- Cirrhochrista cygnalis Pagenstecher, 1907

Species of moth

Cirrhochrista cygnalis is a moth in the family Crambidae. It is found in Madagascar.
