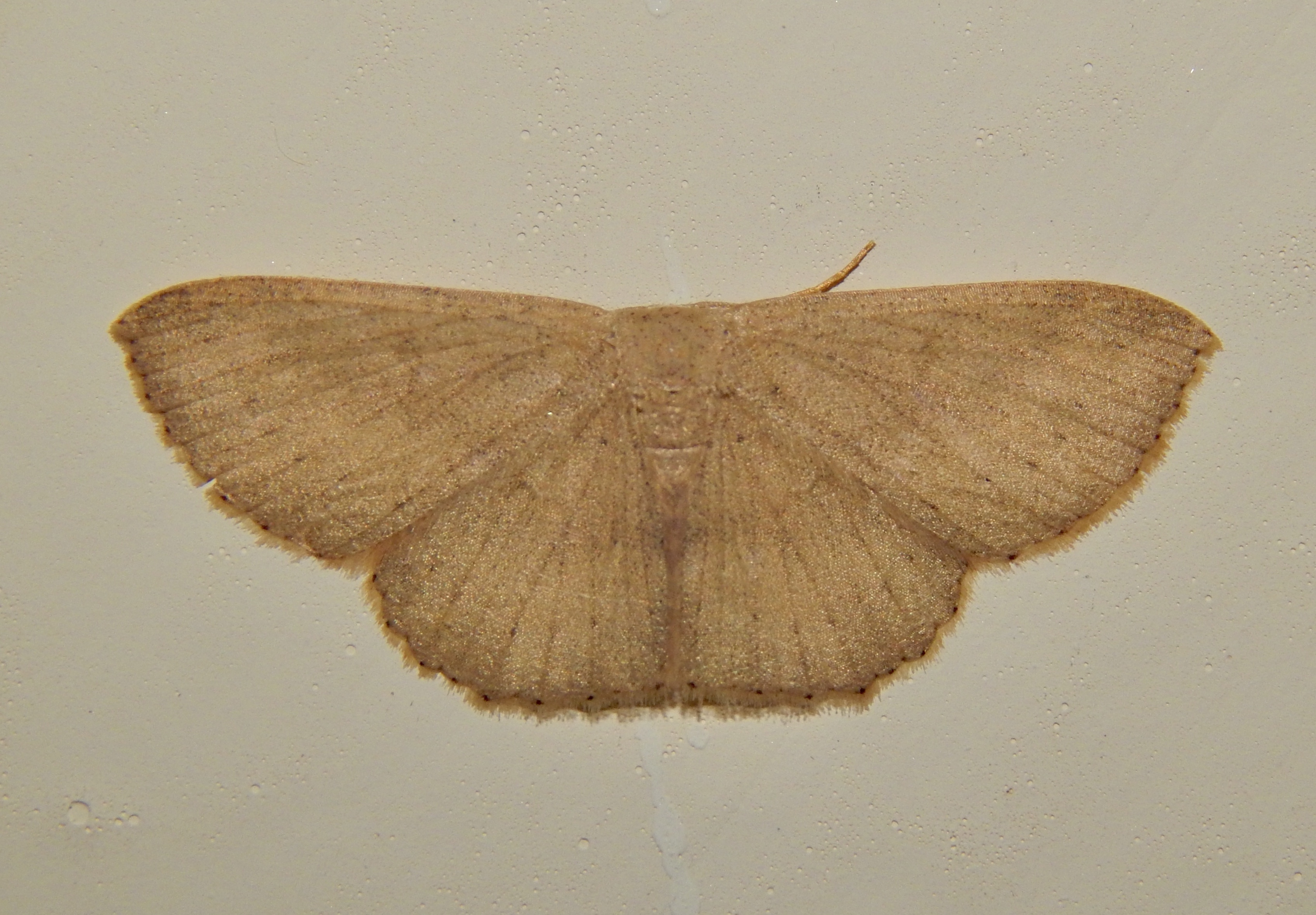
- Perixera moth from Western ghats of India

Scientific classification
- Kingdom: Animalia
- Phylum: Arthropoda
- Class: Insecta
- Order: Lepidoptera
- Family: Geometridae
- Subfamily: Sterrhinae
- Genus: Perixera; Meyrick, 1886

= Perixera =

Genus of moths

Perixera was a genus of moths in the family Geometridae. It is now considered a synonym of Anisodes.

== Selected species ==
- Perixera absconditaria (Walker, 1862)
- Perixera anulifera (Hampson, 1893)
- Perixera monetaria (Guenée, 1858)
- Perixera obliviaria (Walker, 1861)
- Perixera obrinaria (Guenée, 1858)
