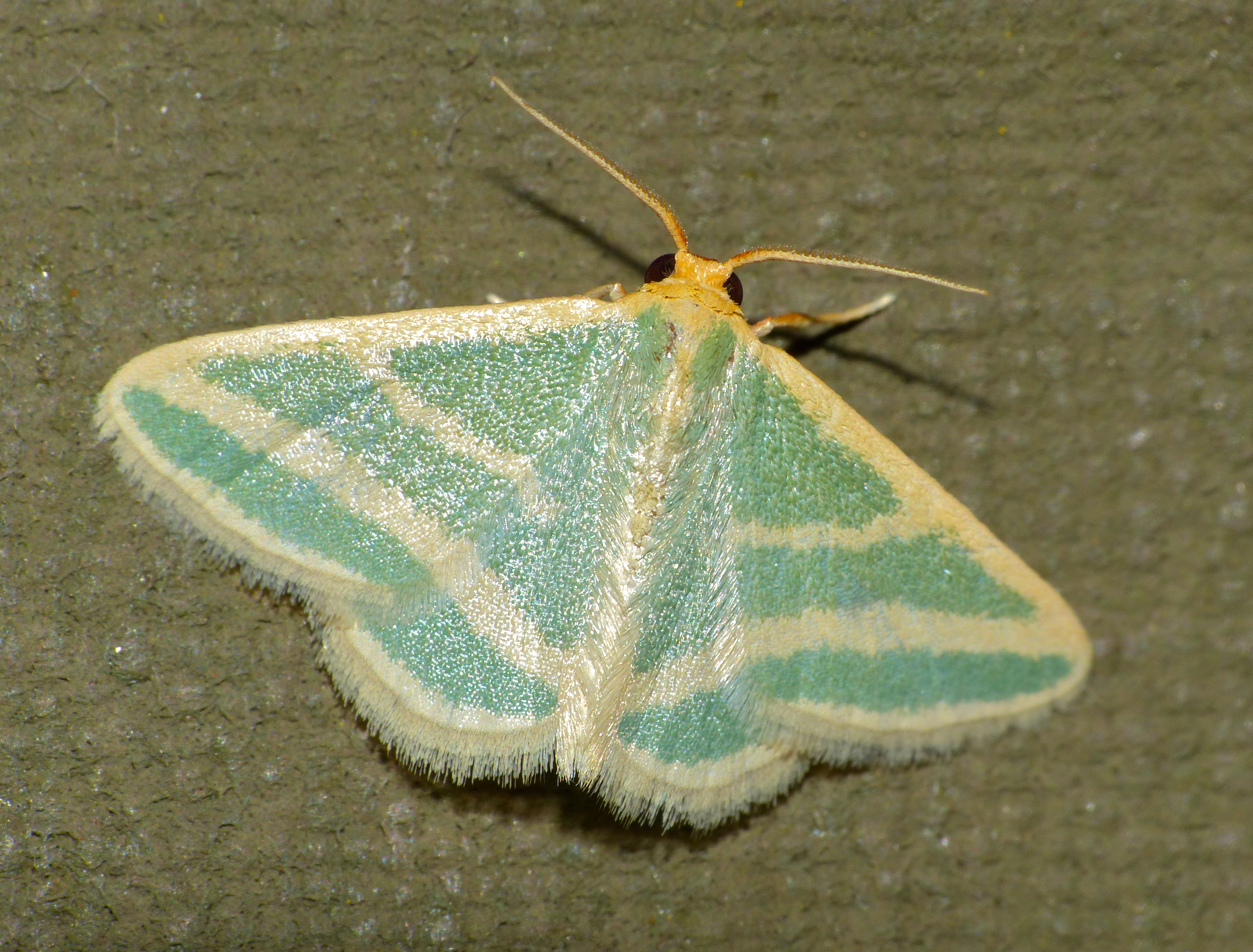
- Mixocera frustratoria

Scientific classification
- Kingdom: Animalia
- Phylum: Arthropoda
- Class: Insecta
- Order: Lepidoptera
- Family: Geometridae
- Subfamily: Geometrinae
- Tribe: Microloxiini
- Genus: Mixocera; Warren, 1901

= Mixocera =

Genus of moths

Mixocera is a genus of moths in the family Geometridae described by Warren in 1901.

== Species ==
- Mixocera latilineata (Walker, 1866) Australia
- Mixocera parvulata (Walker, [1863]) India, Sri Lanka
- Mixocera katharinae Hausmann, 1997 Zaire, Rhodesia, Kenya, Tanzania, Mozambique, South Africa
- Mixocera wiedenorum Hausmann, 1997 Madagascar
- Mixocera albimargo Warren, 1901 Nigeria
- Mixocera ledermanni Hausmann, 1997 Nigeria, Upper Volta
- Mixocera albistrigata (Pagenstecher, 1893) Natal, Tanzania, Rwanda, Kenya
- Mixocera frustratoria (Wallengren, 1863) South Africa
