= Dichromia occatus =

Scientific classification
- Domain: Eukaryota
- Kingdom: Animalia
- Phylum: Arthropoda
- Class: Insecta
- Order: Lepidoptera
- Superfamily: Noctuoidea
- Family: Erebidae
- Genus: Dichromia
- Species: D. occatus

Binomial name
- Dichromia occatus (Moore, 1882)

Synonyms
- Hypena occatus Moore, 1882; Hypena crassipalpis Butler, 1889; Hypena hampsonialis Wileman, 1911

Species of moth

Dichromia occatus is a moth of the family Erebidae first described by Frederic Moore in 1882. It is found in the Indian subregion, Sri Lanka, Taiwan, Japan, Korea, Laos, Borneo, the Philippines, Sulawesi, Java and Bali.
