= Dichromia thermesialis =

Scientific classification
- Kingdom: Animalia
- Phylum: Arthropoda
- Class: Insecta
- Order: Lepidoptera
- Superfamily: Noctuoidea
- Family: Erebidae
- Genus: Dichromia
- Species: D. thermesialis

Binomial name
- Dichromia thermesialis (Walker, [1866])

Synonyms
- Hypena thermesialis Walker, [1866]; Hypena modesta Moore, 1882; Hypena rectifascia Hampson, 1891; Hypena aroa Bethune-Baker, 1908; Hypena propinqua Rothschild, 1920

Species of moth

Dichromia thermesialis is a moth of the family Erebidae first described by Francis Walker in 1866. It is found in India, Sri Lanka, China, Sumatra, Borneo and New Guinea.
