= Cirrhochrista disparalis =

Scientific classification
- Kingdom: Animalia
- Phylum: Arthropoda
- Class: Insecta
- Order: Lepidoptera
- Family: Crambidae
- Genus: Cirrhochrista
- Species: C. disparalis

Binomial name
- Cirrhochrista disparalis (Walker, 1865)

Synonyms
- Botys disparalis Walker, 1865

Species of moth

Cirrhochrista disparalis is a moth in the family Crambidae. It is found in Indonesia, where it has been recorded from the Sula Islands.
