= Perixera monetaria =

Scientific classification
- Kingdom: Animalia
- Phylum: Arthropoda
- Class: Insecta
- Order: Lepidoptera
- Family: Geometridae
- Genus: Perixera
- Species: P. monetaria

Binomial name
- Perixera monetaria (Guenée, 1858)

Synonyms
- Anisodes monetaria Guenée, 1858; Anisodes areolaria Guenée, 1857; Anisodes argentispila Warren, 1893; Anisodes hyperythra Swinhoe, 1894; Perixera (?)pleniluna Warren, 1897

Species of moth

Perixera monetaria is a moth of the family Geometridae first described by Achille Guenée in 1858. It is found in the Indian subregion, Sri Lanka, Sundaland and Sulawesi.

Its wings are uniformly brick red with a large white discal spot to the hindwing. The caterpillar is cylindrical and green with yellow posterior margins. Pupa are grass green with dorsal yellow patches on the abdomen. The caterpillars rest with an arched posture at the edge of young leaves. Host plants include Alseodaphne species.

Three subspecies are recognized.

- Perixera monetaria ceramis Meyrick, 1886
- Perixera monetaria homostola Meyrick, 1897
- Perixera monetaria inornata Warren, 1897
