= Cirrhochrista perbrunnealis =

Scientific classification
- Kingdom: Animalia
- Phylum: Arthropoda
- Class: Insecta
- Order: Lepidoptera
- Family: Crambidae
- Genus: Cirrhochrista
- Species: C. perbrunnealis

Binomial name
- Cirrhochrista perbrunnealis T. B. Fletcher, 1910

Species of moth

Cirrhochrista perbrunnealis is a moth in the family Crambidae. It was described by Thomas Bainbrigge Fletcher in 1910. It is found on the Seychelles, where it has been recorded from Mahé, Ste. Anne and Curieuse.
