= Cirrhochrista argentiplaga =

Scientific classification
- Kingdom: Animalia
- Phylum: Arthropoda
- Class: Insecta
- Order: Lepidoptera
- Family: Crambidae
- Genus: Cirrhochrista
- Species: C. argentiplaga

Binomial name
- Cirrhochrista argentiplaga Warren, 1897

Species of moth

Cirrhochrista argentiplaga is a moth in the family Crambidae. It is found in South Africa.
