= Cirrhochrista xanthographis =

Scientific classification
- Kingdom: Animalia
- Phylum: Arthropoda
- Class: Insecta
- Order: Lepidoptera
- Family: Crambidae
- Genus: Cirrhochrista
- Species: C. xanthographis

Binomial name
- Cirrhochrista xanthographis Hampson, 1919

Species of moth

Cirrhochrista xanthographis is a moth in the family Crambidae. It is found in Papua New Guinea, on the D'Entrecasteaux Islands (Fergusson Island).

The wingspan is about 28 mm. The forewings are pure white with yellow costal fascia, a yellow antemedial line defined by dark scales, a yellow discoidal spot defined by brown lines and a waved postmedial band and crenulate terminal line. The hindwings have a waved yellow subterminal band irrorated with dark scales and a crenulate terminal line.
