= Mixocera parvulata =

Scientific classification
- Kingdom: Animalia
- Phylum: Arthropoda
- Class: Insecta
- Order: Lepidoptera
- Family: Geometridae
- Genus: Mixocera
- Species: M. parvulata

Binomial name
- Mixocera parvulata (Walker, [1863])

Synonyms
- Nemoria ? parvulata Walker, [1863]; Euchloris rectifasciata Hampson, 1896

Species of moth

Mixocera parvulata is a moth of the family Geometridae first described by Francis Walker in 1863. It is found in India, Sri Lanka, Maldives, Vietnam, Ethiopia, Kenya, Madagascar, South Africa, Tanzania and Zimbabwe
