= Natada sericea =

Scientific classification
- Kingdom: Animalia
- Phylum: Arthropoda
- Class: Insecta
- Order: Lepidoptera
- Family: Limacodidae
- Genus: Natada
- Species: N. sericea

Binomial name
- Natada sericea Hampson, 1893

Species of moth

Natada sericea is a moth of the family Limacodidae first described by George Hampson in 1893. It is found in Sri Lanka.
