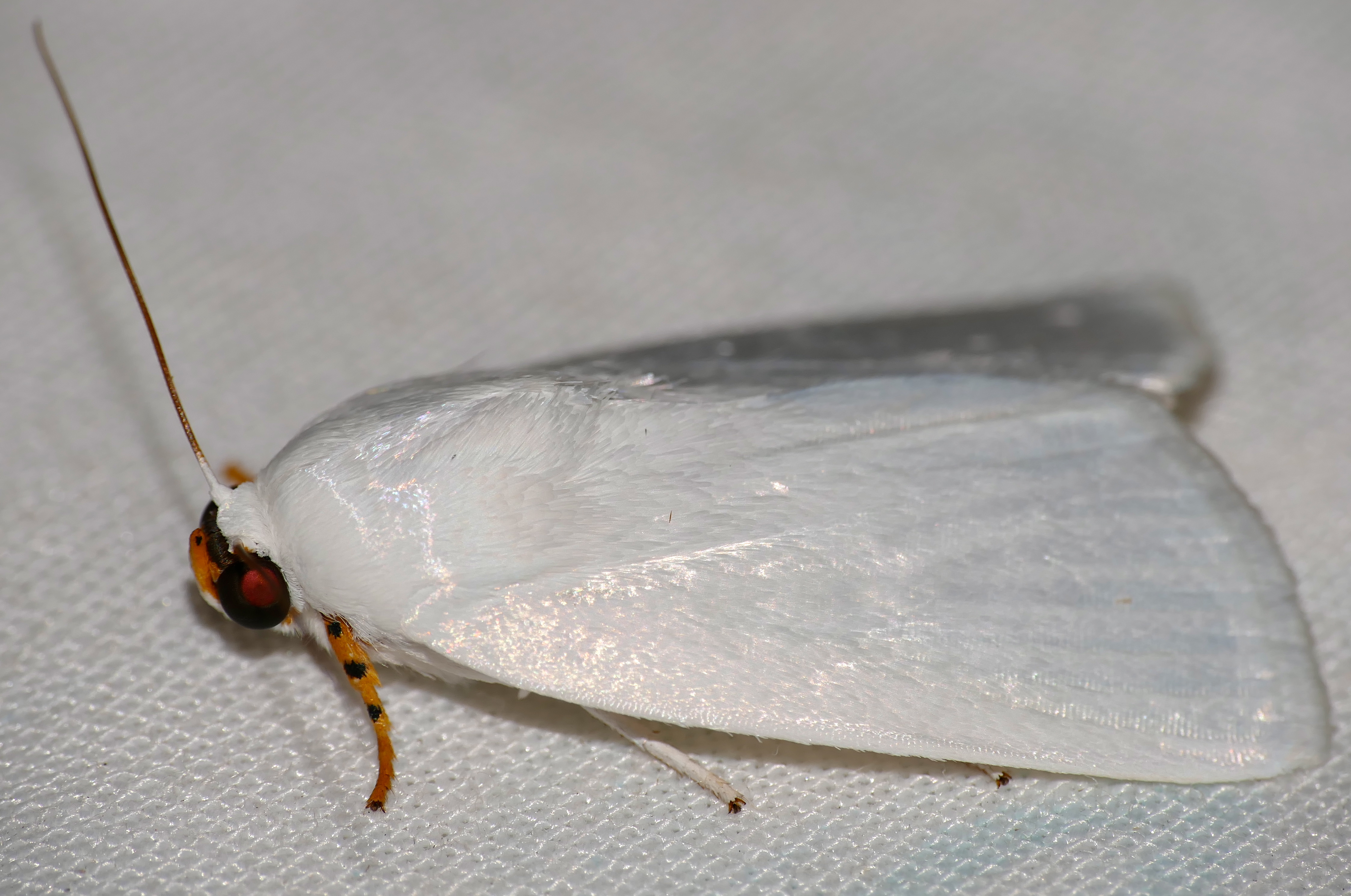

Scientific classification
- Domain: Eukaryota
- Kingdom: Animalia
- Phylum: Arthropoda
- Class: Insecta
- Order: Lepidoptera
- Superfamily: Noctuoidea
- Family: Noctuidae
- Genus: Chasmina
- Species: C. tibialis

Binomial name
- Chasmina tibialis (Fabricius, 1775)

Synonyms
- Bombyx tibialis Fabricius, 1775; Leocyma dianae Guenée, 1852; Chasmina cygnus Walker, 1856; Chasmina glabra Walker, 1865; Leocyma vestae var. celebensis Snellen, 1880

= Chasmina tibialis =

Species of moth

Chasmina tibialis is a moth of the family Noctuidae. It is found from Africa, Asia and from Australia, New Caledonia and Fiji to central Polynesia.

Its wingspan is about 40 mm.

Its larvae have been recorded on Malvaceae species, including Commersonia bartramia, Grewia and Hibiscus species.
