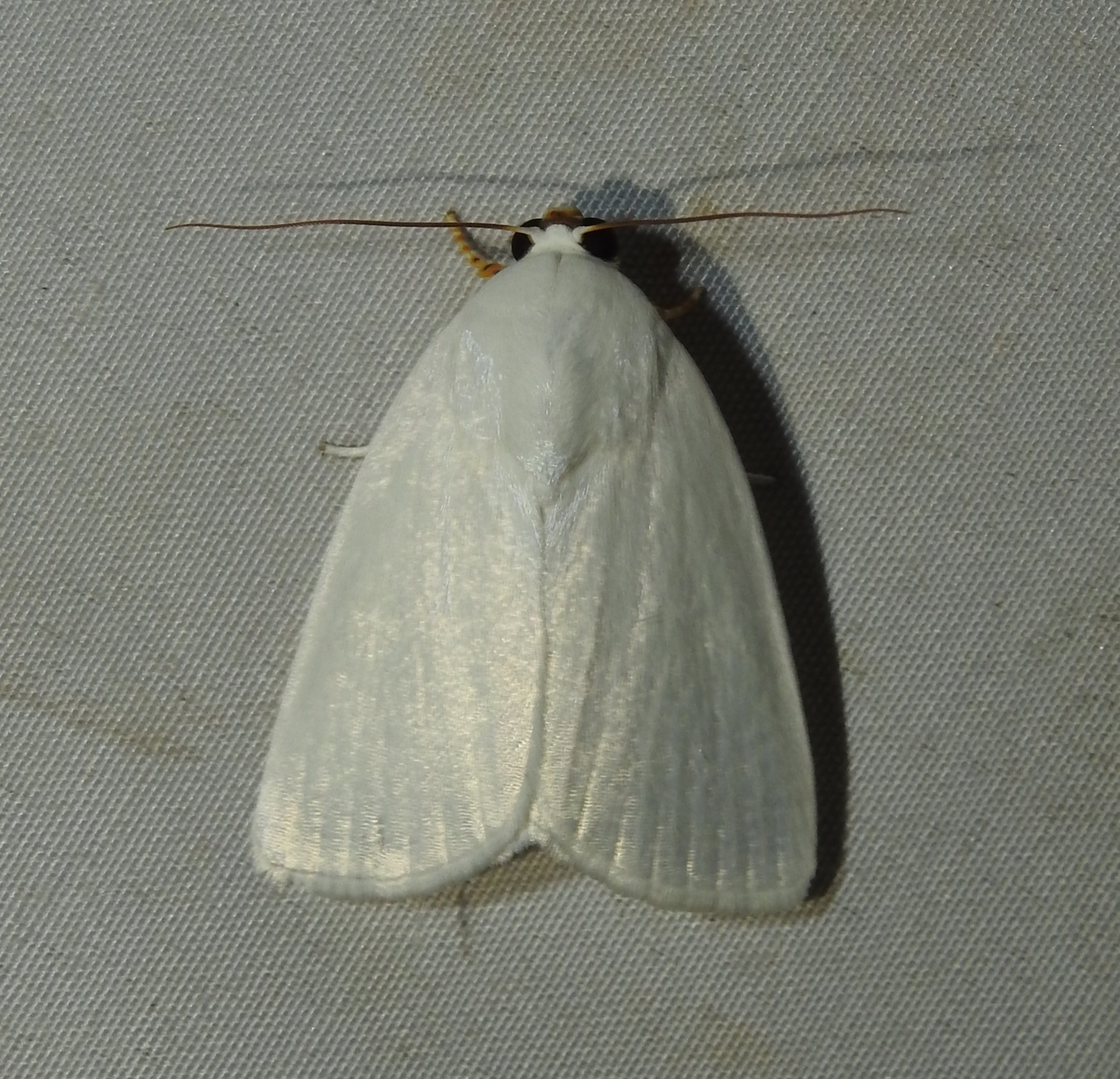

Scientific classification
- Kingdom: Animalia
- Phylum: Arthropoda
- Class: Insecta
- Order: Lepidoptera
- Superfamily: Noctuoidea
- Family: Noctuidae
- Genus: Chasmina
- Species: C. candida

Binomial name
- Chasmina candida (Walker, 1865)

Synonyms
- Arbasera candida Walker, 1865; Chinophlebia sericea Hampson, 1893

= Chasmina candida =

Species of moth

Chasmina candida is a moth of the family Noctuidae described by Francis Walker in 1865. It is found from Indo-Australian tropics east to Fiji, including many islands of the Indian Ocean and Pacific.

== Description ==
Its wingspan is about 40 mm. The forewings of the male are quadrate, where the costa somewhat excised. Costal neuration slightly distorted. Male pure white. Palpi and antennae ochreous. Fore tibia and tarsi orange spotted with black. Mid tibia orange above.

== Ecology ==
The larvae have been recorded on Hibiscus tiliaceus and Thespecia populnea.
