= Scopula aspilataria =

Scientific classification
- Kingdom: Animalia
- Phylum: Arthropoda
- Class: Insecta
- Order: Lepidoptera
- Family: Geometridae
- Genus: Scopula
- Species: S. aspilataria

Binomial name
- Scopula aspilataria (Walker, 1861)

Synonyms
- Acidalia aspilataria Walker, 1861

Species of geometer moth in subfamily Sterrhinae

Scopula aspilataria is a moth of the family Geometridae. It was described by Francis Walker in 1861. It is found in Sri Lanka.

== Description ==
The wingspan is about 22 millimetres (0.87 in). The male is creamy colored with blackish frons. Wings irrorated (sprinkled) with a few black scales. Forewings with antemedial, and both wings with medial, postmedial, submarginal, and marginal very slightly waved bands of a darker tint than the ground color. A series of minute marginal black specks can be seen.
