= Perixera anulifera =

Scientific classification
- Kingdom: Animalia
- Phylum: Arthropoda
- Clade: Pancrustacea
- Class: Insecta
- Order: Lepidoptera
- Family: Geometridae
- Genus: Perixera
- Species: P. anulifera

Binomial name
- Perixera anulifera (Hampson, 1893)

Synonyms
- Trirachopoda anulifera Hampson, 1893; Cyclophora anulifera

Species of moth

Perixera anulifera is a species of moth of the family Geometridae. It is found on the Maldives and Sri Lanka.
