= Cirrhochrista annulifera =

Scientific classification
- Kingdom: Animalia
- Phylum: Arthropoda
- Clade: Pancrustacea
- Class: Insecta
- Order: Lepidoptera
- Family: Crambidae
- Genus: Cirrhochrista
- Species: C. annulifera

Binomial name
- Cirrhochrista annulifera Hampson, 1919

Species of moth

Cirrhochrista annulifera is a moth in the family Crambidae. It is found in Papua New Guinea, on the D'Entrecasteaux Islands (Fergusson Island, Goodenough Island) and in Australia, where it has been recorded from Western Australia, the Northern Territory and Queensland.

The larvae probably feed on Ficus species.
