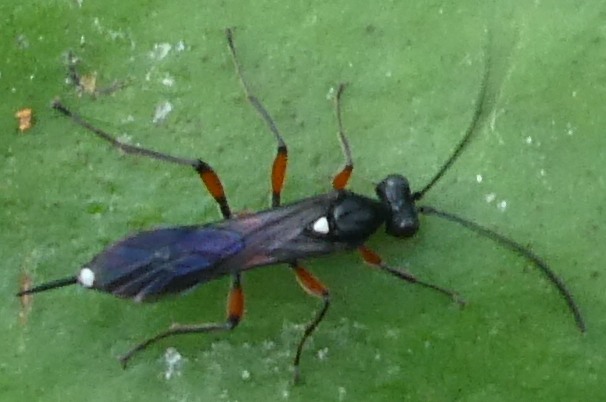
- Apsilops hirtifrons

Scientific classification
- Kingdom: Animalia
- Phylum: Arthropoda
- Class: Insecta
- Order: Hymenoptera
- Family: Ichneumonidae
- Genus: Apsilops; Förster, 1868

Synonyms
- Dapanus Förster, 1868; Heterotypus Förster, 1868; Neostricklandia Viereck, 1925; Sobas Förster, 1868; Trichestema Cushman, 1927; Trichocryptus Thomas, 1873

= Apsilops =

Genus of wasps

Apsilops is a genus of ichneumon wasps in the family Ichneumonidae. There are about nine described species of Apsilops.

== Species ==
These nine species belong to the genus Apsilops:

- Apsilops aquaticus (Thomson, 1874)^{c g}
- Apsilops bicolor (Cushman, 1927)^{i c g}
- Apsilops cinctorius (Fabricius, 1775)^{c g}
- Apsilops hirtifrons (Ashmead, 1896)^{i c g}
- Apsilops japonicus^{g}
- Apsilops scotinus (Tosquinet, 1903)^{c g}
- Apsilops sericata (Viereck, 1925)^{i}
- Apsilops sericatus (Viereck, 1925)^{c g}
- Apsilops tenebrosus Hellen, 1957^{c g}

Data sources: i = ITIS, c = Catalogue of Life, g = GBIF,
