= Termioptycha albifurcalis =

Scientific classification
- Kingdom: Animalia
- Phylum: Arthropoda
- Class: Insecta
- Order: Lepidoptera
- Family: Pyralidae
- Genus: Termioptycha
- Species: T. albifurcalis

Binomial name
- Termioptycha albifurcalis Meyrick, 1905

Synonyms
- Macalla albifurcalis Hampson, 1916; Salma albifurcalis (Hampson): Solis, 1992; Termioptycha albifurcalis (Hampson): Heppner & Inoue, 1992

Species of moth

Termioptycha albifurcalis is a moth in the family Pyralidae. It is found in India and Sri Lanka.
