= Scopula addictaria =

Scientific classification
- Kingdom: Animalia
- Phylum: Arthropoda
- Class: Insecta
- Order: Lepidoptera
- Family: Geometridae
- Genus: Scopula
- Species: S. addictaria

Binomial name
- Scopula addictaria (Walker, 1861)

Synonyms
- Acidalia addictaria Walker, 1861

Species of geometer moths in subfamily Sterrhinae

Scopula addictaria is a moth of the family Geometridae. It was described by Francis Walker in 1861. It is found in Sri Lanka.

== Description ==
The wingspan is about 22–26 millimetres (0.87–1.02 in). Hindwings with more or less angled outer margin at vein 4. It is an ochreous-white moth with bright ochreous. Postmedial line of forewings sinuous and much excurved below costa instead of minutely waved. The patches bright rufous, and the sub-marginal markings bluish grey.
