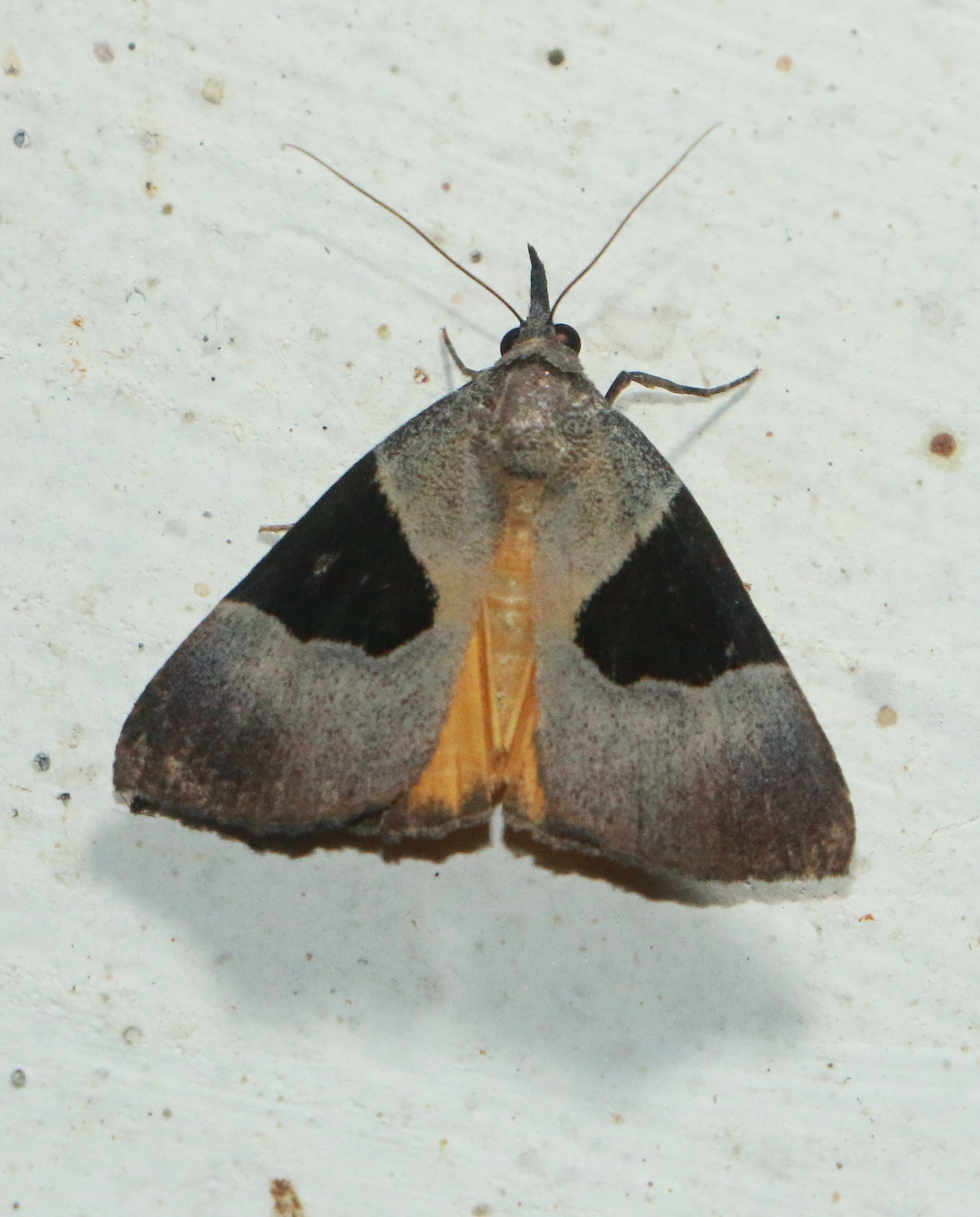

Scientific classification
- Kingdom: Animalia
- Phylum: Arthropoda
- Clade: Pancrustacea
- Class: Insecta
- Order: Lepidoptera
- Superfamily: Noctuoidea
- Family: Erebidae
- Genus: Dichromia
- Species: D. sagitta

Binomial name
- Dichromia sagitta (Fabricius, 1775)

Synonyms
- Noctua sagitta Fabricius, 1775; Phalaena (Noctua) orosia Cramer, 1780; Phalaena (Noctua) macularis Hübner, 1787

= Dichromia sagitta =

Species of moth

Dichromia sagitta is a moth of the family Erebidae first described by Johan Christian Fabricius in 1775. It is found in India, Macau, Hong Kong, Japan and Taiwan.

== Biology ==
The larvae had been recorded on Marsdenia species, Marsdenia volublis (Apocynaceae), Tylophora asthamatica, Tylophora ovata and Tylophora indica, an Asclepiadaceae.
