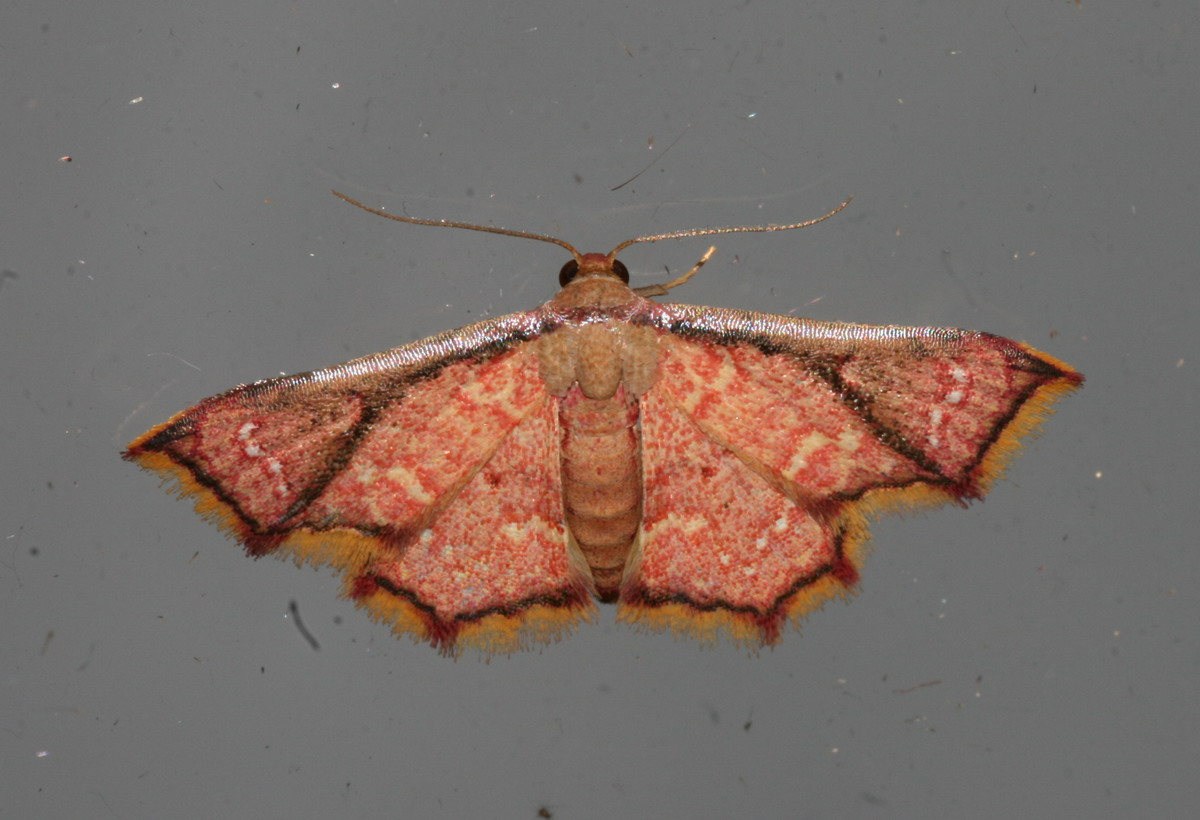
- Enispa elataria

Scientific classification
- Kingdom: Animalia
- Phylum: Arthropoda
- Class: Insecta
- Order: Lepidoptera
- Superfamily: Noctuoidea
- Family: Erebidae
- Tribe: Aventiini
- Genus: Enispa; Walker, [1866]

Synonyms
- Micraeschus Butler, 1878; Chara Staudinger, 1892; Trogacontia Hampson, 1896; Penisa Warren, 1911

= Enispa =

Genus of moths

Enispa is a genus of moths of the family Erebidae. The genus was erected by Francis Walker in 1866.

== Species ==
- Enispa albicosta Hampson, 1910
- Enispa albida Hampson, 1918
- Enispa albifrontata Moore, 1888
- Enispa albigrisea Warren, 1914
- Enispa albilineata Hampson, 1898
- Enispa albinellus Hampson, 1896
- Enispa albipuncta Hampson, 1910
- Enispa albitegulata Warren, 1913
- Enispa albolinearia Leech, 1897
- Enispa albosignata (Staudinger, 1892)
- Enispa algae Hampson, 1910
- Enispa atriceps Hampson, 1910
- Enispa atricincta Hampson, 1907
- Enispa bilineata Wileman, 1916
- Enispa bimaculata (Staudinger, 1892)
- Enispa costisecta Warren, 1913
- Enispa croceicincta Hampson, 1903
- Enispa daphoena Hampson, 1910
- Enispa decens (Viette, 1988)
- Enispa elataria (Walker, 1861)
- Enispa elegans Berio, 1960
- Enispa eosarialis Walker, [1866]
- Enispa erythroglauca Hampson, 1910
- Enispa etrocta Hampson, 1910
- Enispa ferreofusa Hampson, 1910
- Enispa flavicincta Hampson, 1910
- Enispa flavipars Hampson, 1916
- Enispa flavitincta Hampson, 1914
- Enispa griseipennis Hampson, 1891
- Enispa inversa Warren, 1913
- Enispa issikii Fukushima, 1944
- Enispa leprosa Hampson, 1910
- Enispa leptinia (Mabille, 1900)
- Enispa leucogramma Hampson, 1910
- Enispa leucosticta Hampson, 1910
- Enispa lichenostola Hampson, 1910
- Enispa lutefascialis Leech, 1889
- Enispa lycaugesia Hampson, 1910
- Enispa masuii Sugi, Sugi, Kuroko, Moriuti & Kawabe, 1982
- Enispa minuta Hampson, 1893
- Enispa niviceps Turner, 1909
- Enispa oblataria Walker, 1861
- Enispa oinistis Hampson, 1907
- Enispa oligochra Prout, 1926
- Enispa parva Bethune-Baker, 1906
- Enispa phaeopa Turner, 1945
- Enispa poliorhoda Hampson, 1907
- Enispa prolectus Turner, 1908
- Enispa purpurascens Hampson, 1907
- Enispa quadricostaria Walker, 1861
- Enispa regulata Walker, 1861
- Enispa rhodopleura Turner, 1945
- Enispa rosea Hampson, 1893
- Enispa roseata Hampson, 1902
- Enispa rosellus Hampson, 1893
- Enispa rubrescens Warren, 1913
- Enispa rubrifuscaria Hampson, 1903
- Enispa rufapicia Hampson, 1918
- Enispa simplex Berio, 1963
- Enispa terminipuncta Wileman & South, 1916
- Enispa vinacea Hampson, 1891
- Enispa violacea Lucas, 1894
