= Enispa rubrifuscaria =

Scientific classification
- Kingdom: Animalia
- Phylum: Arthropoda
- Class: Insecta
- Order: Lepidoptera
- Superfamily: Noctuoidea
- Family: Erebidae
- Genus: Enispa
- Species: E. rubrifuscaria

Binomial name
- Enispa rubrifuscaria (Hampson, 1903)

Synonyms
- Penisa rubrifuscaria Hampson, 1904; Chrysocraspeda rubrifuscaria Hampson, 1903

Species of moth

Enispa rubrifuscaria is a moth of the family Noctuidae first described by George Hampson in 1903. It is found in Sri Lanka.
