= Enispa oinistis =

Scientific classification
- Kingdom: Animalia
- Phylum: Arthropoda
- Class: Insecta
- Order: Lepidoptera
- Superfamily: Noctuoidea
- Family: Erebidae
- Genus: Enispa
- Species: E. oinistis

Binomial name
- Enispa oinistis (Hampson, 1907)

Synonyms
- Penisa oinistis Hampson, 1907; Micraeschus oinistis Hampson, 1907

Species of moth

Enispa oinistis is a moth of the family Erebidae first described by George Hampson in 1907. It is found in Sri Lanka.
