= Enispa rufapicia =

Scientific classification
- Kingdom: Animalia
- Phylum: Arthropoda
- Class: Insecta
- Order: Lepidoptera
- Superfamily: Noctuoidea
- Family: Erebidae
- Genus: Enispa
- Species: E. rufapicia

Binomial name
- Enispa rufapicia Hampson, 1918

Species of moth

Enispa rufapicia is a moth of the family Noctuidae first described by George Hampson in 1918. It is found in Sri Lanka.
