= Enispa albinellus =

Scientific classification
- Kingdom: Animalia
- Phylum: Arthropoda
- Class: Insecta
- Order: Lepidoptera
- Superfamily: Noctuoidea
- Family: Erebidae
- Genus: Enispa
- Species: E. albinellus

Binomial name
- Enispa albinellus (Hampson, 1896)

Synonyms
- Micraeschus albinellus Hampson, 1896

Species of moth

Enispa albinellus is a moth of the family Noctuidae first described by George Hampson in 1896. It is found in Sri Lanka.
