= Enispa oblataria =

Scientific classification
- Kingdom: Animalia
- Phylum: Arthropoda
- Class: Insecta
- Order: Lepidoptera
- Superfamily: Noctuoidea
- Family: Erebidae
- Genus: Enispa
- Species: E. oblataria

Binomial name
- Enispa oblataria (Walker, 1861)

Synonyms
- Penisa oblataria Walker, 1861; Hyria oblataria Walker, 1861

Species of moth

Enispa oblataria is a moth of the family Erebidae first described by Francis Walker in 1861. It is found in Sri Lanka.
