= Micraeschus rosellus =

Scientific classification
- Kingdom: Animalia
- Phylum: Arthropoda
- Class: Insecta
- Order: Lepidoptera
- Superfamily: Noctuoidea
- Family: Erebidae
- Genus: Micraeschus
- Species: M. rosellus

Binomial name
- Micraeschus rosellus (Hampson, 1893)

Synonyms
- Enispa rosellus Hampson, 1893

Species of moth

Micraeschus rosellus is a moth of the family Erebidae first described by George Hampson in 1893. It is found in Sri Lanka and Taiwan.
