= Enispa minuta =

Scientific classification
- Kingdom: Animalia
- Phylum: Arthropoda
- Class: Insecta
- Order: Lepidoptera
- Superfamily: Noctuoidea
- Family: Erebidae
- Genus: Enispa
- Species: E. minuta

Binomial name
- Enispa minuta (Hampson, 1893)

Synonyms
- Hyria minuta Hampson, 1893

Species of moth

Enispa minuta is a moth of the family Noctuidae first described by George Hampson in 1893. It is found in Sri Lanka.
