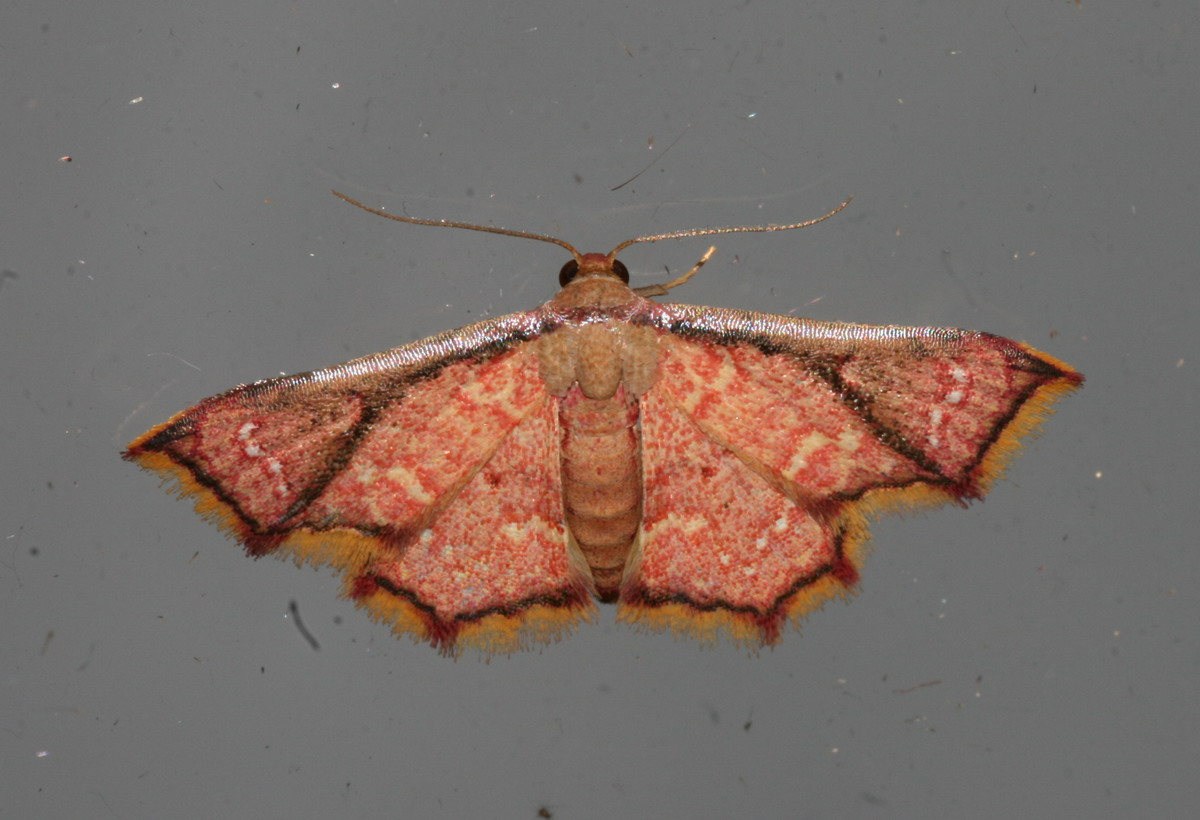
- Micraeschus elataria from Malaya

Scientific classification
- Domain: Eukaryota
- Kingdom: Animalia
- Phylum: Arthropoda
- Class: Insecta
- Order: Lepidoptera
- Superfamily: Noctuoidea
- Family: Erebidae
- Tribe: Aventiini
- Genus: Micraeschus; Butler, 1878

= Micraeschus =

Genus of moths

Micraeschus is a genus of moths of the family Erebidae first described by Arthur Gardiner Butler in 1878.

== Description ==
Palpi very slender and obliquely upturned, reaching vertex of head. Antennae with fasciculated cilia in male. Thorax and abdomen tuftless. Legs naked, with normal spurs. Forewing with veins 7 to 10 stalked. Hindwings with stalked 3 and 4. Larva with two pairs of abdominal prolegs.

== Species ==
- Micraeschus elataria Walker, 1861
- Micraeschus rufipallens Warren, 1913
