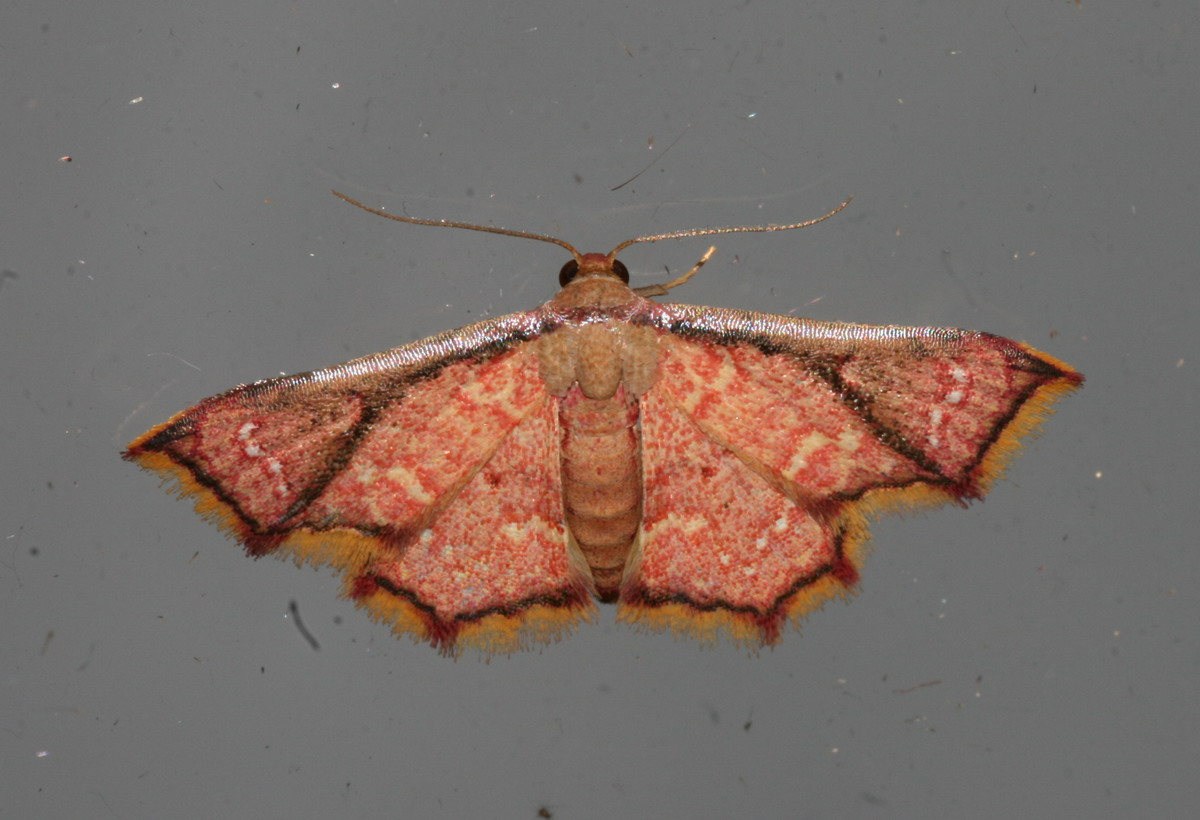

Scientific classification
- Kingdom: Animalia
- Phylum: Arthropoda
- Class: Insecta
- Order: Lepidoptera
- Superfamily: Noctuoidea
- Family: Erebidae
- Genus: Micraeschus
- Species: M. elataria

Binomial name
- Micraeschus elataria (Walker, 1861)

Synonyms
- Hyria elataria Walker, 1861; Enispa elataria Walker, 1861

= Micraeschus elataria =

Species of moth

Micraeschus elataria is a moth of the family Erebidae first described by Francis Walker in 1861. It is found in Sri Lanka, Taiwan, Peninsular Malaysia, Singapore, Java and Borneo.
