= Lachana =

Scientific classification
- Kingdom: Animalia
- Phylum: Arthropoda
- Class: Insecta
- Order: Lepidoptera
- Superfamily: Noctuoidea
- Family: Erebidae
- Tribe: Lymantriini
- Genus: Lachana; Moore, 1888

Genus of moths

Lachana is a genus of moths in the subfamily Lymantriinae. The genus was described by Frederic Moore in 1888. It contains species native to alpine areas on high mountains in the south of the Central Asia. The females do not have wings and lay their eggs within their own old cocoons.

== Taxonomy ==
This genus, described by Frederic Moore in 1888, was monotypic for over a century, with L. ladakensis as the only species, and thought to be endemic to Ladakh in the Himalayas of India. In 1984 Karel Spitzer considered that all of the species except L. ladakensis belonged within the genus Gynaephora in the subgenus Dasyorgyia, a move he had made provisionally in 1981 already. The subgenus Dasyorgyia had as type species Gynaephora pumila, when this taxon was moved by Tatyana A. Trofimova to Dicallomera pumila in 2008, she was also obliged to move Lachana alpherakii, L. selenophora and L. sincera to Lachana from the subgenus Dasyorgyia. She furthermore described a new species from India, Lachana kulu.

L. ladakensis is the type species.

== Species ==
- Lachana alpherakii (Grum-Grshimailo, 1891) - Tibet-Qinghai Plateau, Gansu
- Lachana kulu Trofimova, 2008 - Kullu Valley, India
- Lachana ladakensis Moore, 1888 - Ladakh, India
- Lachana selenophora (Staudinger, 1887) - from the Tian-shan and Pamiro-Alai mountains of Kyrgyzstan, also central Afghanistan.
- Lachana sincera (Kozhanchikov, 1950) - Wakhan Mountains in southern Gorno-Badakhshan, Tajikistan

The following species, all from the Tibetan Plateau, have been placed in Gynaephora. A study of DNA markers of the species of that genus published in 2015 found them allied closer to the outgroup Lachana alpherakii, and likely should be moved to Lachana.

- Gynaephora aureata Chou & Ying, 1979
- Gynaephora jiuzhiensis
- Gynaephora menyuanensis Yan & Chou, 1997 - from the Tibet-Qinghai Plateau, China.
- Gynaephora minora Chou & Ying, 1979
- Gynaephora qinghaiensis Chou & Ying, 1979 - A possible synonym or subspecies of L. alpherakii according to Spitzer (1984) and Trofimova (2008).
- Gynaephora qumalaiensis
- Gynaephora ruoergensis Chou & Ying, 1979 - A synonym of L. selenophora according to Spitzer (1984).

== Description ==
The males of this genus have a thick aedeagus. They have an arcuate and slender juxta, and squarish-shaped and relatively short valva.

The females of this genus, of the only two species in which they have been seen, lack wings and are flightless.

Lachana differs from Gynaephora by the species being smaller, in details of the male genitalia described above, and with slight differences in positioning of the veins M1, M2 and M3 in the forewings, and M3 in the hindwings. The hindwings are extremely similar to those of Dicallomera.

== Distribution and habitat ==
All of the species are native to alpine regions on high mountain ranges in Central Asia.

== Ecology ==
According to Spitzer the larvae are oligophagous, feeding only on Poaceae (grasses), in those of which the host plants are known. However, caterpillars of L. alpherakii were found to feed on the shrub Elaeagnus angustifolia. With all of the species of which the egg-laying behaviour is known, the females lay their eggs within their own old cocoons. The larvae are mimics of Micrarctia caterpillars. L. alpherakii is the host species of the parasitoid eulophid wasp Sympiesis qinghaiensis.
