= Lachana selenophora =

Scientific classification
- Domain: Eukaryota
- Kingdom: Animalia
- Phylum: Arthropoda
- Class: Insecta
- Order: Lepidoptera
- Superfamily: Noctuoidea
- Family: Erebidae
- Genus: Lachana
- Species: L. selenophora

Binomial name
- Lachana selenophora (Staudinger, 1887)

Synonyms
- Dasychira selenophora Staudinger, 1887; Gynaephora selenophora (Staudinger, 1887); Dasyorgyia pamiricola Strand, 1910?; ?Gynaephora ruoergensis Chou & Ying, 1979

Species of moth

Lachana selenophora is a species of moth of the subfamily Lymantriinae. It is found in alpine habitats on the high mountains (from 1,000 to 3,600 meters) in Central Asia (Tian-Shan, Pamiro-Alai and Hindu Kush).

== Description ==
The wingspan is 24–28 mm.

=== Infraspecific variability ===
Grigory Grum-Grshimailo distinguishes some geographic variability in wing colour, finding those specimens from the south in the Hindu Kush lighter and somewhat more reddish yellow, with those halfway at Kyzylart Pass intermediate between the two, than the type specimen and specimens from the northern Alay Mountains.

=== Similar species ===
Otto Staudinger, in his original description of the species, found the two males he had access to most similar in wing colour to females of the species Gynaephora selenitica, but smaller. He also compares it to Dicallomera pumila.

It is extremely similar to D. pumila, according to Igor Vasilii Kozhanchikov.

== Taxonomy ==
This species was first described in 1887 by Staudinger under the name Dasychira selenophora based on two adult male specimens sent from a city in what is now southeastern Uzbekistan. He uses the construction Dasychira (Dasyorgyia) selenophora -at present this notation specifically means he classifies it in subgenus Dasyorgyia, but this convention had not yet universally been adopted and in this case he states that he considers it provisionally in the genus Dasychira, but should ever females with stunted wings be found, he would consider it better placed in a new genus, Dasyorgyia, along with the species Dasychira pumila he had previously described from Kazakhstan in 1881. These were grown from caterpillars, and the females had emerged with curiously deformed wings, which led Staudinger to question if the animals had been raised correctly, or if was the natural form. In this 1881 description Staudinger concluded by coining Dasyorgyia as an alternative genus name, should D. pumila require classifying in an independent genus.

Grum-Grshimailo, in his work on the moths and butterflies of the Pamir region, describes finding this species a number of times during his four expeditions to this region in the late 1880s. He also uses the name Dasychira (Dasyorgyia) selenophora, although he, not having found females, refrains from making a further taxonomic decision. He only collected male specimens. He advances the theory in this work, that the D. pumila moths studied by Staudinger were in fact two species, with the males in fact being D. selenophora. According to Staudinger in 1901, and later Kozhanchikov in 1950, Grum-Grshimailo was erroneous when referring to the Staudinger's plates of male D. pumila for his male D. selenophora specimens in his 1890 work.

In 1892 William Forsell Kirby eventually classified it in the new genus Dasyorgyia anyway, together with the species previously known as Dasychira pumila. In his 1901 catalogue of Palearctic Lepidoptera, Staudinger then followed Kirby in classifying the species in the genus Dasyorgyia. Embrik Strand, in 1912 (Kozhanchikov gives the date 1910, this is likely a mistake), described Dasyorgyia pamiricola, which was synonymised with this species before 1950.

In 1950 Kozhanchikov classified it in the genus Gynaephora, synonymising the genus Dasyorgyia to Gynaephora.

In 1981 Karel Spitzer and Karel Černý published the rediscovery of the species by Černý in the high mountains of the Central Asian part of the USSR. They classified it in subgenus Dasyorgyia of the genus Gynaephora. Karel Spitzer reiterated this subgeneric classification in a 1984 paper, in which he also synonymised the new Chinese taxon G. ruoergensis with this species.

In 2008 Tatyana A. Trofimova reclassified G. pumila as Dicallomera pumila. Because this was the type species of the subgenus Dasyorgyia, she was also obliged to reclassify Gynaephora selenophora and some other species, and ended up transferring the rest of the subgenus Dasyorgyia to the hitherto monotypic genus Lachana.

== Distribution ==
It has been photographed in the Pamiro-Alai near Fergana. As of 1984 it had been collected in the Alay Mountains ("Archa-bakhi"); in the Zaalaisk Mountains at the Kyzylart Pass in Kyrgyzstan on the border between Gorno-Badakshan province in Tajikistan and Osh Province, Kyrgyzstan; in the Pamir Mountain proper at a place called "Kara-kuzun" and at Beyik Pass, at 4200m elevation, in far eastern Gorno-Badakshan, leading to the Taghdumbash Pamir region of Xinjiang; and in the Hindu Kush.

The distribution has often been stated to include to the Fergana Region, Uzbekistan, because the first two specimens were sent by a man living in the city of Margilan, however it is not made clear that these specimens were collected locally.

I. Chernavina also collected a specimen on the Pereval Tegarak pass, Jalal-Abad Region, Kyrgyzstan, on an expedition of the Zoological Institute of the Imperial Saint Petersburg Academy of Sciences in 1913, which has been classified as different species (Gynaephora rossii and G. selenitica), according to Kozhanchikov this was a specimen of L. selenophora.

== Ecology ==
The caterpillars are mimics of the caterpillars of Micrarctia, a genus of moths in the subfamily Arctiidae, and are black (but dark rusty on the thoracic segments) with no distinct dorsal brushes or hair-pencils. The caterpillars feed on grass species in the genus Dactylis. The males fly during the day from the second half of June to early August.

The male are "heliophilous", seeking out light. They fly calmly and low over the ground, and as such are easy to capture, and are only found out before midday. The females lay their eggs within the cocoons they pupated in.

Grum-Grshimailo encountered his specimens in the Pamir Mountains always in the same habitats: small patches of thawed ground amongst snowy fields, in somewhat wet areas, and amongst Ranunculaceae beginning to flower and herbs including what he thought were perhaps Gentiana.

== Conservation ==
This insect has only unambiguously been collected by three people over the past one and a half century. The first was one Herr Maurer living in the city of Margilan who sent two male specimens for study to German regions in the 1880s, and the second was Grigory Grum-Grshimailo who traversed the mountains of the Pamir region in four expeditions between 1884 and 1889 and was able to collect a number of male specimens at high altitudes on remote mountain passes, always in the summer. It then remained unseen for almost a century, until Karel Černý managed to collect the first ever female in the early 1980s.

Grum-Grshimailo states that it is found all over the vast region of the Pamirs in the same specific alpine habitats, but that in general it is very rarely encountered.
