= Lachana sincera =

Scientific classification
- Domain: Eukaryota
- Kingdom: Animalia
- Phylum: Arthropoda
- Class: Insecta
- Order: Lepidoptera
- Superfamily: Noctuoidea
- Family: Erebidae
- Genus: Lachana
- Species: L. sincera

Binomial name
- Lachana sincera (Kozhanchikov, 1950)

Synonyms
- Gynaephora sincera Kozhanchikov, 1950

Species of moth

Lachana sincera is a species of moth of the subfamily Lymantriinae. A single example was found in 1909 at high elevations in the Wakhan range of the Pamir Mountains of Tajikistan and is only known to have seen again since in 1961. This was also in the area, making it provisionally endemic to southern Gorno-Badakhshan.

== Taxonomy ==
It was named by Igor Vasilii Kozhanchikov as Gynaephora sincera in his 1950 compendium of the Orgyiini moths of the USSR (which included these genera at the time). He based the species on a single male specimen collected by one O. John in the Pamir Mountains in 1909. In 1984 Karel Spitzer believed this to be the only known example of the occurrence of this moth, apparently being unaware of two newer specimens collected in 1961. At this time Spitzer supposed it might be a synonym of Lachana selenophora, but being unable to examine the holotype, he was unable to be confident about the subject, but in any case he found it closely related to this species. Spitzer classified it within the subgenus Dasyorgyia of the genus Gynaephora, in his treatment of that genus. The subgenus Dasyorgyia had as type species Gynaephora pumila, when this taxon was moved by Tatyana A. Trofimova to Dicallomera pumila in 2008, she was also obliged to move Lachana sincera as well as L. alpherakii and L. selenophora and to Lachana from the subgenus Dasyorgyia.

The holotype, and the two other specimens, are kept at the Zoological Institute of the Russian Academy of Sciences, St. Petersburg.

== Description ==
The wingspan is about 24 mm.

=== Similar species ===
Kozhanchikov finds it most similar to Lachana alpherakii and L. selenophora. Spitzer theorised it might be synonymous with L. selenophora, based solely on the description. Trofimova found the wing colour and pattern most similar to similar to that of L. ladakensis and L. selenophora, differing most noticeably by the "clear zigzag bands".

== Distribution ==
The first of the only specimens of this species ever found was collected on the 29th of June in 1909 at 3600m elevation at a location Kozhanchikov calls the Map Pass in the Pamir Mountains. According to Trofimova the label on the specimen is spelled slightly differently and that it refers to the Mats River in the Wakhan Range in southern Gorno-Badakhshan in eastern Tajikistan.

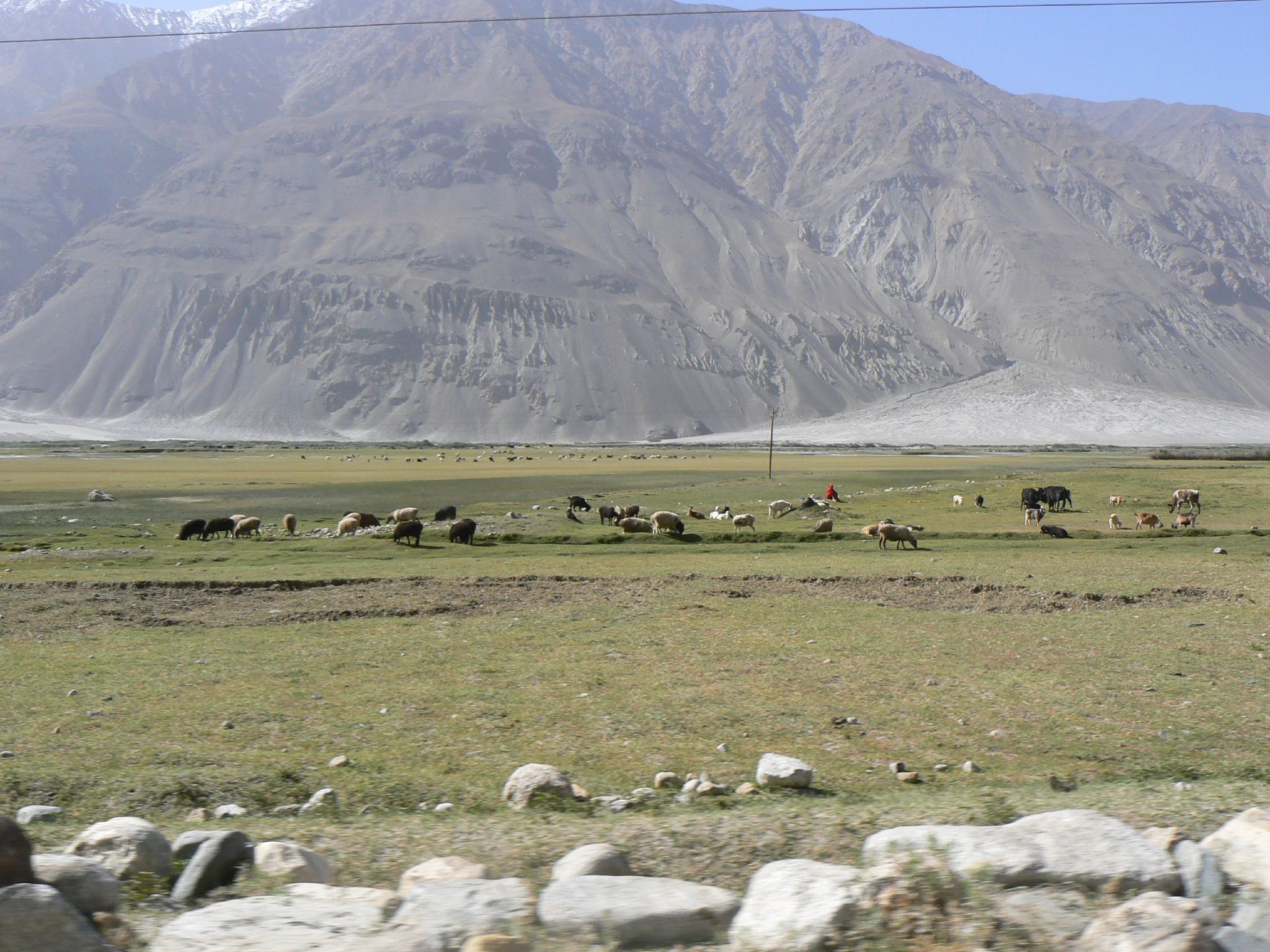
Landscape of the Wakhan Corridor in Afghanistan between Pakistan and Tajikistan in September.

Two more males were collected 19 July 1961 at 3200 m elevation at a location called "Angoudar" in the mountains around the city of Khorugh, also in southern Gorno-Badakhshan.

Its distribution is thus sandwiched between known populations of L. selenophora in central Afghanistan to the south and those to the north in the further stretches of the Pamirs.

== Ecology ==
Practically nothing is known about the ecology, and larvae or females have never been seen. Males have been collected from late June to mid-July at high elevations of 3200 to 3600 m in mountain regions.
