= Lachana kulu =

Scientific classification
- Domain: Eukaryota
- Kingdom: Animalia
- Phylum: Arthropoda
- Class: Insecta
- Order: Lepidoptera
- Superfamily: Noctuoidea
- Family: Erebidae
- Genus: Lachana
- Species: L. kulu

Binomial name
- Lachana kulu Trofimova, 2008

Species of moth

Lachana kulu is a species of moth of the subfamily Lymantriinae from northern India seen once in 1913.

== Taxonomy ==
It was described as a new species in 2008 by Tatyana A. Trofimova from a two male specimens collected by Henry John Elwes from the Kullu Valley of northern India in 1913, which had sat undescribed at the Zoological Institute of the Russian Academy of Sciences, St. Petersburg for the past century. The holotype was designated by Trofimova as one of the two specimens.

=== Etymology ===
The species name is derived from the name of the locality where the types were found.

== Description ==
The female has never been seen.

=== Similar species ===
Trofimova considered it most closely related to Lachana alpherakii, a species with a larger distribution to the east in the mountains of southwestern China. It differs from this species by the generally darker grey wing colouration. It is the only Lachana with a light-coloured fringe to its wings, and can further be distinguished by morphological details of the valva, a component of the male genitalia.

== Distribution ==
It is only known from two specimens collected in the Kullu Valley of the southern Himalayas in northern Himachal Pradesh, India, in 1913, and has never been seen since.

It has the most southwestern distribution of the Lachana species. It is not sympatric with any other Lachana species; the nearest species is L. ladakensis found in the mountains of Ladakh some 400 km due north.

== Ecology ==
Absolutely nothing is known about the ecology of this species.
