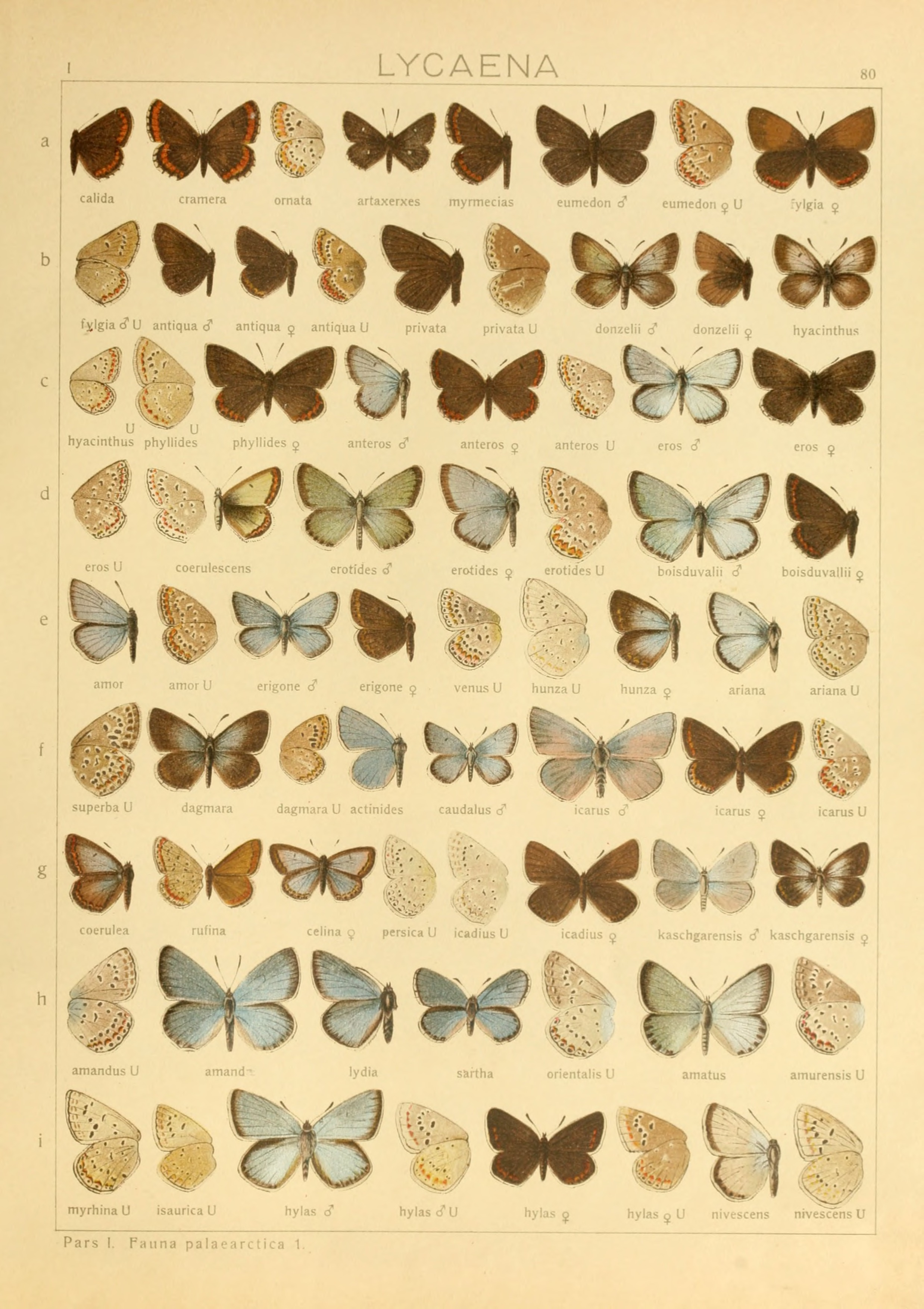
- Seitz plate 80e

Scientific classification
- Kingdom: Animalia
- Phylum: Arthropoda
- Class: Insecta
- Order: Lepidoptera
- Family: Lycaenidae
- Genus: Polyommatus
- Species: P. hunza

Binomial name
- Polyommatus hunza (Grum-Grshimailo, 1890)

= Polyommatus hunza =

Species of butterfly

Polyommatus hunza is a butterfly in the family Lycaenidae. It was described by Grigory Grum-Grshimailo in 1890. It is found in the Pamir Mountains.

Seitz under Polyommatus stoliczkanus "hunza Gr.-Grsh. (80) are very large specimens with almost entirely white underside, the ocelli and russet-coloured marginal spots being reduced to weak vestiges; from the Pamir."
