= Lachana alpherakii =

Scientific classification
- Kingdom: Animalia
- Phylum: Arthropoda
- Class: Insecta
- Order: Lepidoptera
- Superfamily: Noctuoidea
- Family: Erebidae
- Genus: Lachana
- Species: L. alpherakii

Binomial name
- Lachana alpherakii (Grum-Grshimailo, 1891)

Synonyms
- Dasychira alpherakii Grum-Grshimailo, 1891; Gynaephora alpherakii (Grum-Grshimailo, 1891); Dasychira semenovi Grum-Grshimailo, 1891; Dasorgyia grumi Staudinger, 1901; Trichosona haulberti Oberthür, 1911; Dasorgyia alpherakii f. staudingeri O.Bang-Haas, 1938; Phragmatobia oberthueri Rothschild, 1910

Species of moth

Lachana alpherakii is a species of moth of the subfamily Lymantriinae first described by Grigory Grum-Grshimailo in 1891. It is found in the high mountains of Tibet and China.

== Description ==
The wingspan is 22–27 mm.

== Taxonomy ==
Grigory Grum-Grshimailo first described this species from Qinghai, China, using the scientific name Dasychira alpherakii in 1891. The species epithet commemorates Sergei Alphéraky, a Greek Russian entomologist from Taganrog who spent the latter part of his life studying the Lepidoptera of Central Asia and East Asia. The following year, in 1892, William Forsell Kirby moved it to the genus Dasorgyia. In 1910 Embrik Strand moved it to the genus Gynaephora, where it was eventually placed in the subgenus Dasorgyia, with as type species G. pumila, by Douglas C. Ferguson in 1978, and Karel Spitzer in 1984. G. pumila was moved to Dicallomera pumila in 2008 by Tatyana A. Trofimova, who was then obliged to look into the other species in the subgenus Dasorgyia, and ended up moving all three to Lachana.

A DNA study published by Vladimir A. Lukhtanov and Olga Khruleva in 2015 found the species Gynaephora aureata, G. jiuzhiensis, G. menyuanensis, G. minora, G. qinghaiensis, G. qumalaiensis and G. ruoergensis all to be closer related to Lachana alpherakii than to any of the other species of Gynaephora. In 1984 Spitzer had suggested G. qinghaiensis was a synonym or a subspecies of G. alpherakii, although he did not formally move the taxon. Trofimova also suggested in 2008 that G. qinghaiensis, G. aureata, G. ruoergensis and G. minora, all described from China by Chou and Ying in 1979, are possibly synonyms of Lachana alpherakii, although not having been able to study the type specimens, she was unable to say anything further.

== Distribution ==
The species has been collected numerous times around the lake of Koko Nor. In China it is known from the provinces, of Tibet (near a place rendered as "Jecundo") and further from west to east, neighbouring Qinghai (including Koko Nur, Tianjun County), and Gansu (including Ganzhou District, near Lanzhou and the Xining Mountains bordering Qinghai). There is also a doubtful record from much further west, in the Pamirs.

== Ecology ==
It is known from mountains at extremely high altitudes, having been collected or observed at elevations of 3000-4500m.

The larvae feed on Elaeagnus angustifolia.

It is the primary host species for the parasitoid is the eulophid wasp Sympiesis qinghaiensis of the subfamily Eulophinae in Qinghai.
