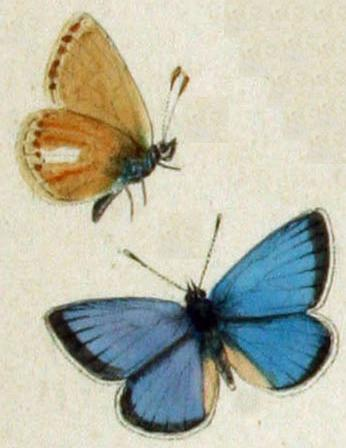
- in Reise der Österreichischen Fregatte Novara
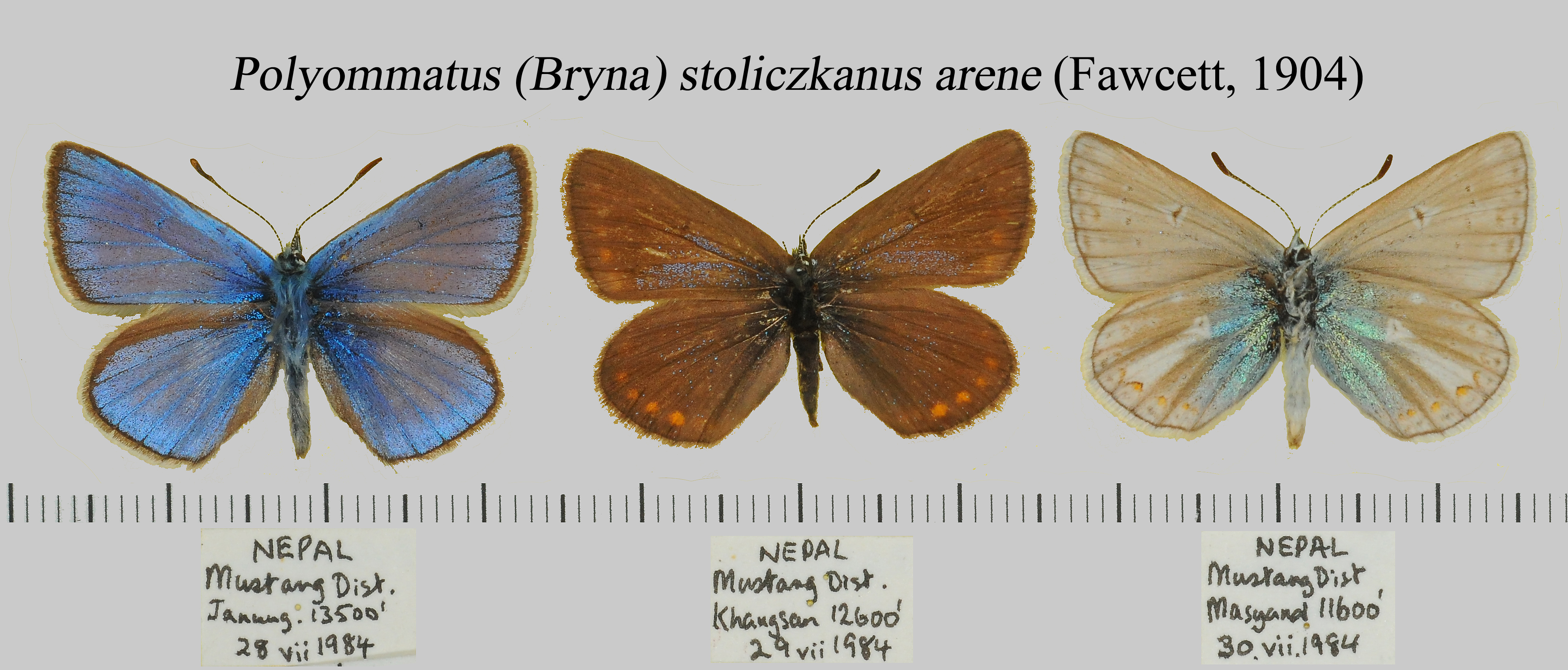
- P.s. arene

Scientific classification
- Kingdom: Animalia
- Phylum: Arthropoda
- Class: Insecta
- Order: Lepidoptera
- Family: Lycaenidae
- Genus: Polyommatus
- Species: P. stoliczkanus

Binomial name
- Polyommatus stoliczkanus (Felder & Felder, [1865])

Synonyms
- Lycaena stoliczkana C. & R. Felder, [1865]; Lycaena ariana var. arene Fawcett, 1904; Polyommatus eros janetae Evans, 1927

= Polyommatus stoliczkanus =

Species of butterfly

Polyommatus stoliczkanus is a butterfly in the family Lycaenidae. It is found from the western Himalayas to Nepal.

== Description ==
L. stoliczkanuis very variable in size and in the markings of the underside. On the whole considerably larger than the preceding insects, above a very brilliant violet-blue, in the shade of icarus but with a broader black margin and sometimes with a distinct discocellular spot on the forewing. Underside Iighter and more diffuse than in most other species of this group, the red-yellow submarginal markings sometimes absent or very pale, hardly noticeable; on the other hand the underside is much more variegated with white, on the centre of the hindwing, around the ocelli and before the margin, the last being occasionally broadly white. From Kashmir. — ariana Moore (80e), which name Bingham treats as a synonym, are according to Staudinger and Rebel the larger specimens, such as are found typically beyond the boundary of the Palearctic territory in North India, but occur also already in Southern Kashmir. — hunza Gr.-Grsh. (80) are very large specimens with almost entirely white underside, the ocelli and russet-coloured marginal spots being reduced to weak vestiges; from the Pamir. — A very remarkable form has been discovered a few years ago at Khamba-Yong (Tibet):Fawc. The hindwing beneath bears only one ocellus, which is placed below the centre of the costal margin; at the apex of the cell there is a white triangular smear, towards which another is directed from the middle of the outer margin. Distal margin beneath white, with minute black dots, before it a russet-red lunate line. — This species is widely distributed, being in Kashmir the commonest Blue and going up to 15500 ft. in the Pamir. In the north of its area it flies on pastures in high situations, in June and July; in the south it appears to occur everywhere and throughout the year.

== Subspecies ==
- Polyommatus stoliczkanus stoliczkanus
- Polyommatus stoliczkanus arene (Fawcett, 1904) (Tibet)
- Polyommatus stoliczkanus janetae Evans, 1927 (western Himalayas)
