= Lithosarctia thomasi =

Scientific classification
- Kingdom: Animalia
- Phylum: Arthropoda
- Clade: Pancrustacea
- Class: Insecta
- Order: Lepidoptera
- Superfamily: Noctuoidea
- Family: Erebidae
- Subfamily: Arctiinae
- Genus: Lithosarctia
- Species: L. thomasi

Binomial name
- Lithosarctia thomasi de Freina & Witt, 1994

Species of moth

Lithosarctia thomasi is a moth of the family Erebidae. It was described by Josef J. de Freina and Thomas Joseph Witt in 1994. It is found in Tibet, China and Nepal.
