= Lithosarctia y-albulum =

Scientific classification
- Domain: Eukaryota
- Kingdom: Animalia
- Phylum: Arthropoda
- Class: Insecta
- Order: Lepidoptera
- Superfamily: Noctuoidea
- Family: Erebidae
- Subfamily: Arctiinae
- Genus: Lithosarctia
- Species: L. y-albulum

Binomial name
- Lithosarctia y-albulum (Oberthür, 1886)

Synonyms
- Arctia Y albulum Oberthür, 1886; Arctia y-albulum lugubris Oberthür, 1886; Ocnogyna y-albulum var. rubida Leech, 1899; Ocnogyna y-albulum; Ocnogyna y-albula

Species of moth

Lithosarctia y-albulum is a moth of the family Erebidae. It was described by Charles Oberthür in 1886. It is found in China (Sichuan, Qinghai).
