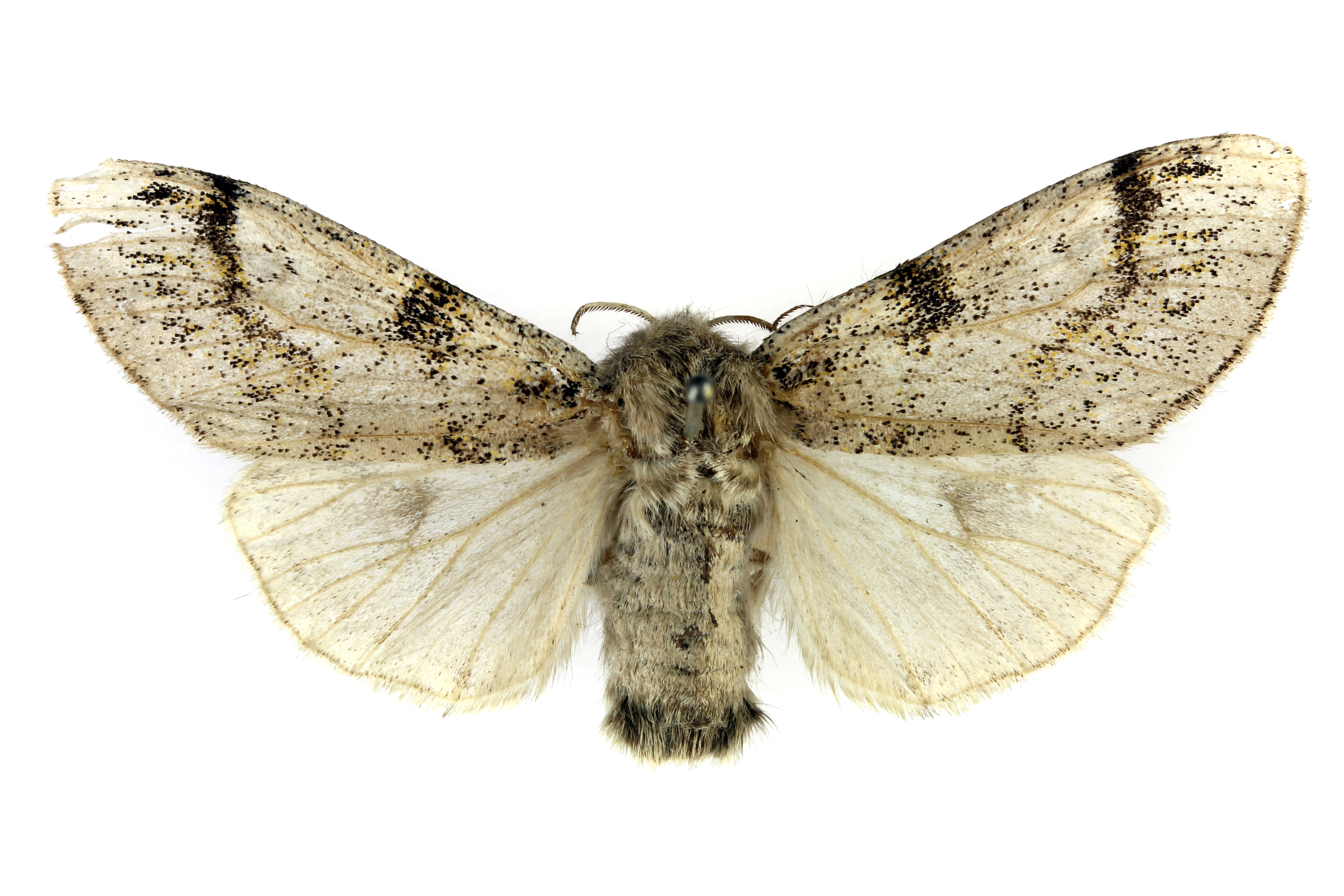
- Dicallomera fascelina

Scientific classification
- Kingdom: Animalia
- Phylum: Arthropoda
- Clade: Pancrustacea
- Class: Insecta
- Order: Lepidoptera
- Superfamily: Noctuoidea
- Family: Erebidae
- Tribe: Orgyiini
- Genus: Dicallomera; Butler, 1881

Synonyms
- Dasorgyia Staudinger ex. Kirby, 1882

= Dicallomera =

Genus of moths

Dicallomera is a genus of tussock moths in the family Erebidae.

== Taxonomy ==
Linnaeus first described Phalaena bombyx fascelina in 1758. Arthur Gardiner Butler first created the genus Dicallomera in 1881, for which he made Dicallomera fascelina the type species. In 1887 Otto Staudinger moved this species to the genus Dasychira, and also described a new species, D. nivalis -he had previously described D. pumila in 1881, and would later describe D. obscurata in 1900 (now a subspecies of Dicallomera nivalis). In 1934 Felix Bryk moved it and a number of Dasychira species to the genus Olene. Igor Vasilii Kozhanchikov followed Bryk in 1950, but Douglas C. Ferguson in 1978 moved O. fascelina and a number of species back to Butler's Dicallomera. One new species, Dicallomera kusnezovi from Wrangel Island in far northern Arctic Russia, was described in 1989 by Vladimir A. Lukhtanov and Khruliova, and a few other species were moved to Dicallomera, including D. pumila by Tatyana A. Trofimova in 2008 from Gynaephora. D. kusnezovi was subsumed as a subspecies under Gynaephora groenlandica by Vladimir A. Lukhtanov and Olga Khruleva in 2015 following DNA research.

== Species ==
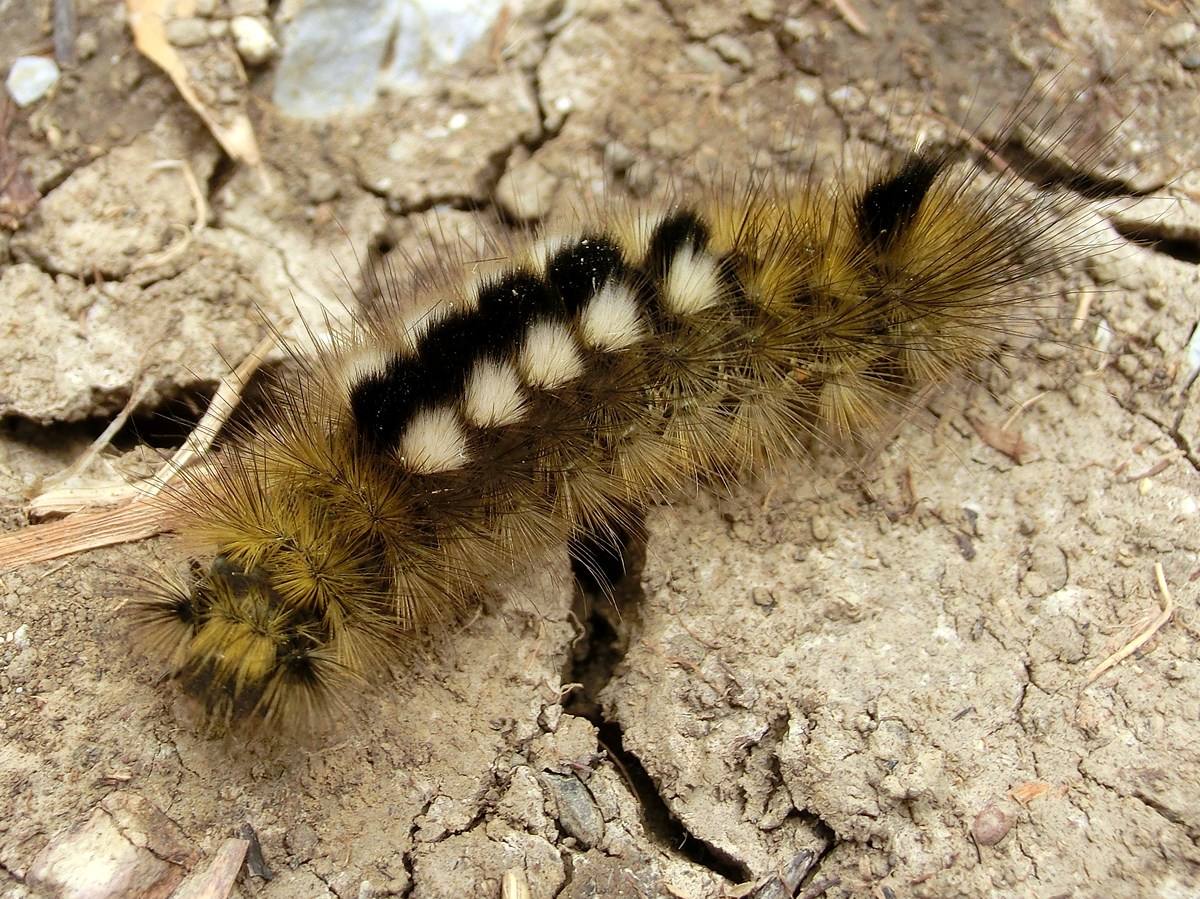
4-5 cm long caterpillar of Dicallomera fascelina in mountain meadows of yellow alfalfa at c. 1800 m elevation, north of Bach near Lech Valley, Austria.

- Dicallomera angelus (Chetverikov, 1904)
- Dicallomera fascelina (Linnaeus, 1758) Butler, 1881
  - D. f. fascelina
  - D. f. caucasica Sheljuzhko, 1919
  - D. f. danieli de Freina, 1979
  - D. f. fischeri Daniel, 1952
  - D. f. karafutonis Matsumura, 1933
  - D. f. moto Bryk, 1949
  - D. f. obscura Zetterstedt, 1840
  - D. f. salangi Ebert, 1968
- Dicallomera kaszabi (Daniel, 1969)
- Dicallomera nivalis (Staudinger, 1887)
  - D. n. nivalis
  - D. n. obscurata (Staudinger, 1900)
- Dicallomera olga (Oberthür, 1881)
- Dicallomera pumila (Staudinger, 1881) Trofimova, 2008
