= Lithosarctia kozlovi =

Scientific classification
- Kingdom: Animalia
- Phylum: Arthropoda
- Clade: Pancrustacea
- Class: Insecta
- Order: Lepidoptera
- Superfamily: Noctuoidea
- Family: Erebidae
- Subfamily: Arctiinae
- Genus: Lithosarctia
- Species: L. kozlovi

Binomial name
- Lithosarctia kozlovi Dubatolov, 2002

Species of moth

Lithosarctia kozlovi is a moth of the family Erebidae. It was described by Vladimir Viktorovitch Dubatolov in 2002. It is found in Sichuan, China.
