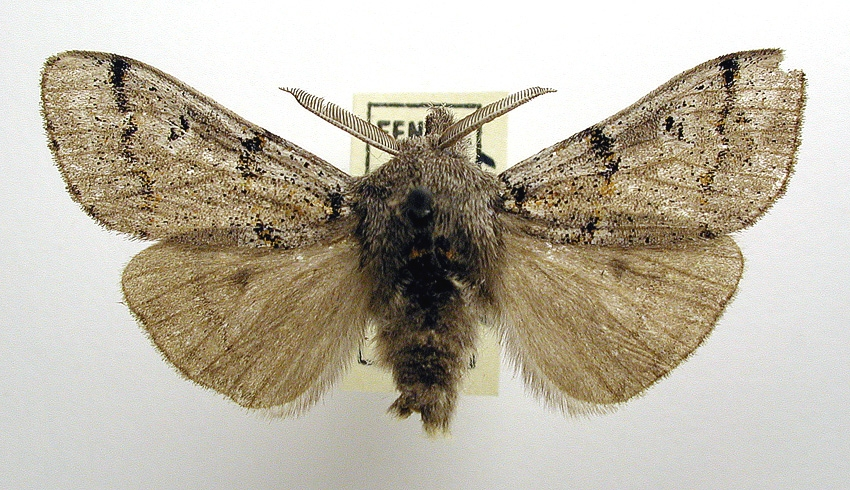
- Mounted
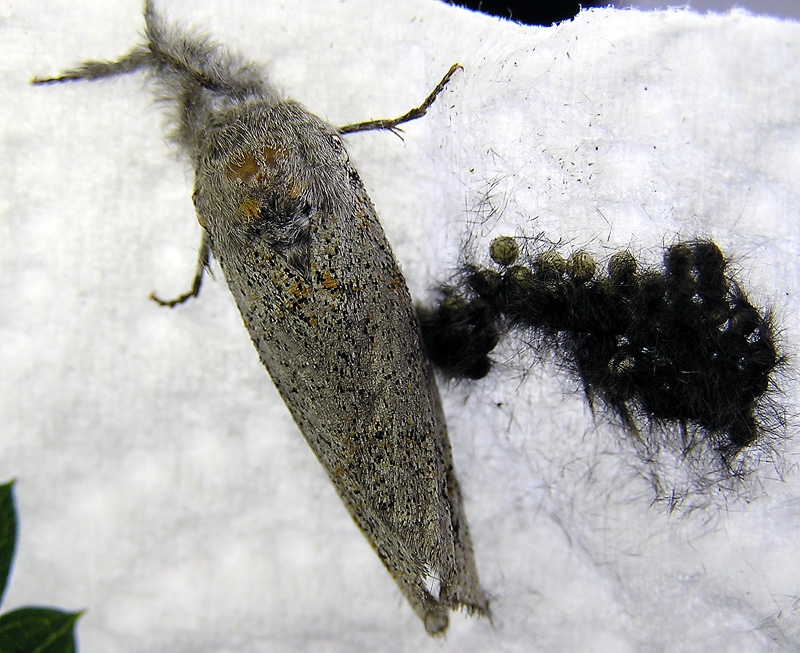
- Female with eggs

Scientific classification
- Kingdom: Animalia
- Phylum: Arthropoda
- Clade: Pancrustacea
- Class: Insecta
- Order: Lepidoptera
- Superfamily: Noctuoidea
- Family: Erebidae
- Genus: Dicallomera
- Species: D. fascelina

Binomial name
- Dicallomera fascelina (Linnaeus, 1758)

Synonyms
- Calliteara fascelina

= Dicallomera fascelina =

Dark tussock

Species of moth

Dicallomera fascelina, the dark tussock, is a moth in the family Erebidae. The species was first described by Carl Linnaeus in his 1758 10th edition of Systema Naturae. It is found in most of Europe, through the Palearctic to Central Asia to Korea.

== Technical description and variation ==
The wingspan is 35–45 mm. "Forewing ash-grey, lighter at the costal margin, with black and yellow irrorations, the median area bounded on the inner side by a regularly curved dark transverse line and on the outer side by a similar one twice or three times broken; both lines being most distinct at the costal margin. Hindwing grey or whitish. ab. proletaria Strand does not attain more than 29 mm. in the male; it is also distinguished by the ground colour of both wings being olive-grey, with the two transverse lines rather indistinct and not reaching the hindmargin, while the discocellular spot is more conspicuous than in true fascelina. - medicagitlis Hbn. is darker in the female. Forewing black-grey, the light costal area only indicated at the most, but the sharply defined discocellular spot situated in a white patch from which extend long acute prolongations directed marginad; the outer transverse band is broad and distinct, theinner one diffuse; both dusted with rusty yellow. Hindwing dark grey, with a submarginal row of dark smears. — laricis Schille is an almost uniformly ash-grey form with scarcely any black or white irroration, with shortened and obsolescent transverse stripes, living on larches. The Arctic obscura Zeit. is much darker, with the forewing uniformly black-grey without any markings except the usually indistinct outer transverse line. In ab. unicolor Schultz (from the Vallais) the forewing is said to be light grey, quite unicolorous without any markings. — nivalis Stgr., which the author [Strand] suspected to be a 'species darwiniana' of the preceding and which is perhaps a distinct species, is larger (male 42–46 mm.) and much lighter; hindwing sometimes almost quite white, only in the female somewhat variegated with grey, and dusted with blackish below costally; the light ash-grey forewing bears two obsolescent transverse bands suffused with orange. Antenna of male with longer pectinations and less pointed at the apex than in fascelina. Central Asia, in the higher mountains (Alai, Transalai, Hazret-Sultan Mts., near Samarkand, Issyk-kul). - obscura Stgr. are specimens of nivalis from the eastern Tian-shan and the Uliassutai in which the whitish grey forewing is so densely dusted with blackish that the ground colour is almost superseded; the transverse bands almost obsolete. Hindwing grey with darker median dot and obsolescent submarginal band. - angelus Tschetverikow also belongs to the group of D. fascelina nivalis, but is distinguished from the other forms by the much clearer chalky white colour of the forewing, which bears a strongly developed black discoidal spot, and by the hindwing being dirty white with a dark median spot and dark outer band. Occurs in the southern foothills of the Sajan Mts., northern Mongolia (male 37 mm.)"

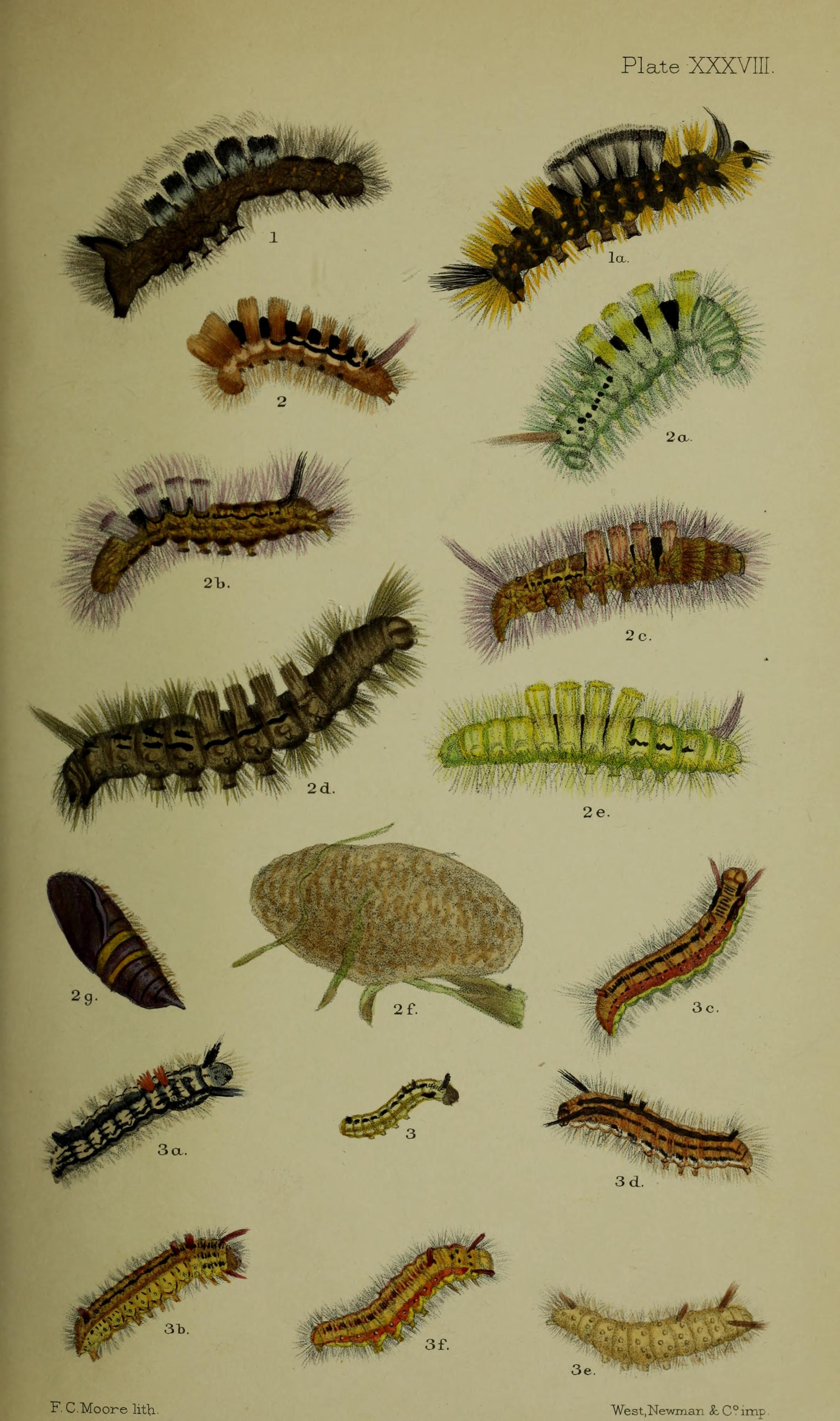
Fig.1, 1a larvae after final moult

== Biology ==
The moth flies from June to July.

Eggs are whitish, covered with wool. Larva blackish grey, the tufts at the sides of the thorax and on the end-segment long and black; the rest of the body covered with grey hair, the dorsal tufts whitish black above. When long exposed, especially after hibernation, the dorsal hairs acquire a sulphur-yellow tinge, but this always vanishes after the moult. Hibernates when one-third grown, and pupates at the beginning of June in a blackish grey cocoon intermixed with the hairs of the larva, the pupa being clothed with brownish hairs dorsally. The larvae feed on various herbaceous plants, such as Cytisus scoparius, Crataegus monogyna, Rubus fruticosus, Calluna vulgaris, Onobrychis viciifolia, Salvia pratensis and Lotus corniculatus.

== Gallery ==
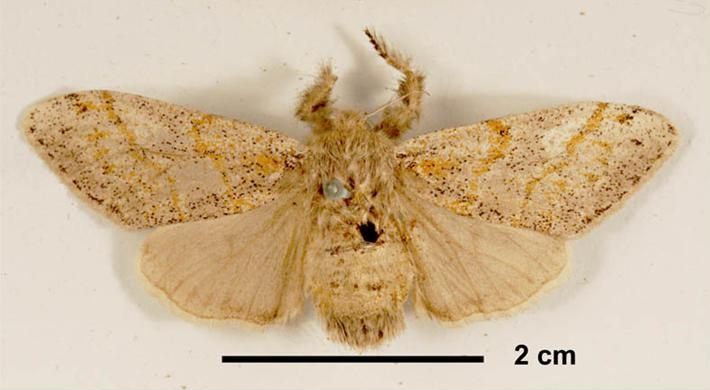
Female, mounted

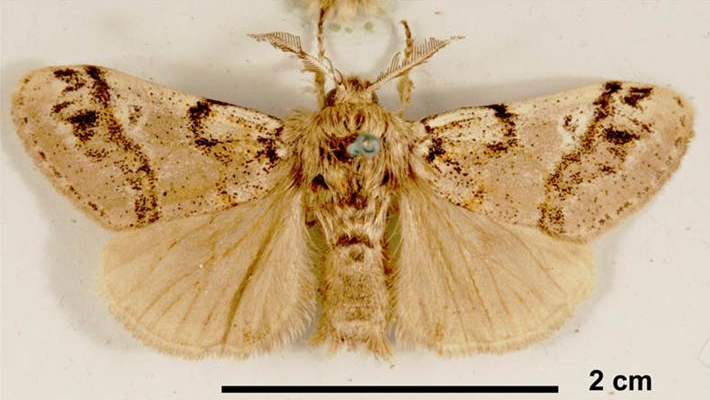
Male, mounted

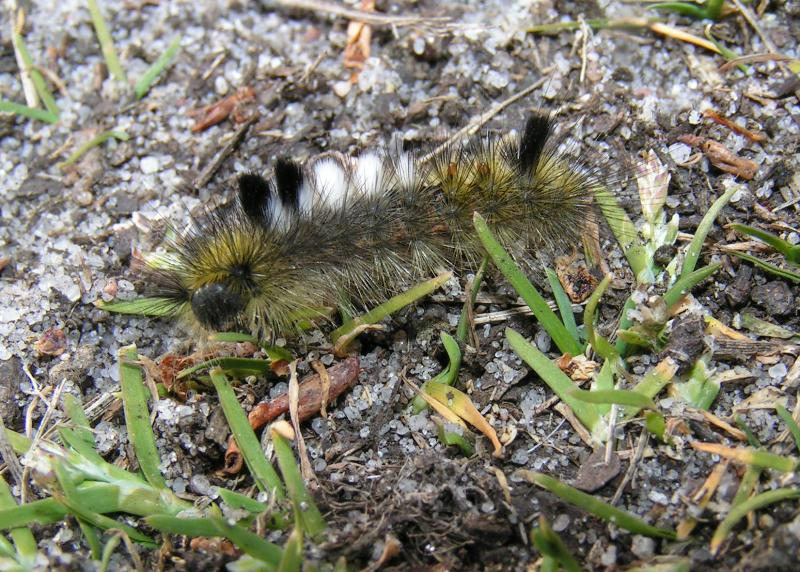
Larva
