= Lithosarctia goergneri =

Scientific classification
- Kingdom: Animalia
- Phylum: Arthropoda
- Clade: Pancrustacea
- Class: Insecta
- Order: Lepidoptera
- Superfamily: Noctuoidea
- Family: Erebidae
- Subfamily: Arctiinae
- Genus: Lithosarctia
- Species: L. goergneri

Binomial name
- Lithosarctia goergneri de Freina & Witt, 1994

Synonyms
- Lithosarctia y-albula goergneri de Freina & Witt, 1994

Species of moth

Lithosarctia goergneri is a moth of the family Erebidae. It was described by Josef J. de Freina and Thomas Joseph Witt in 1994. It is found in Gansu, China.
