= M. E. Grum-Grshimailo =

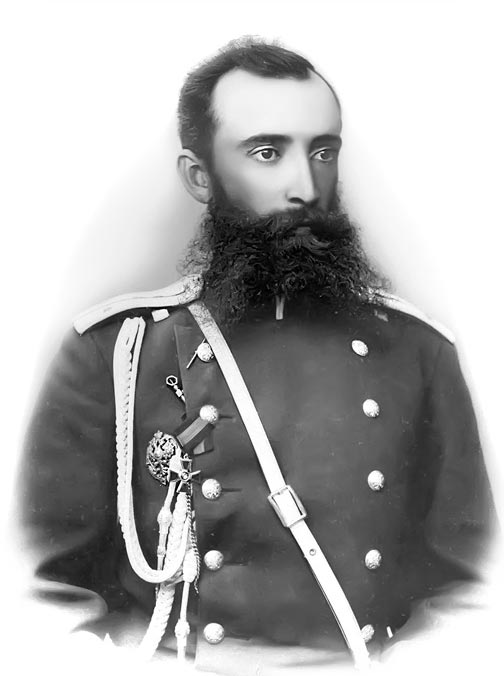

Mikhail Efimovich Grum-Grshimailo (Russian: Михаил Ефимович Грум-Гржимайло; 1861 – 8 May 1921) was a Russian army officer, inventor and explorer. He was a brother of Grigory Grum-Grshimailo.

Grum-Grshimailo was born in the Mogilev province to Efim Grigoryevich Grum-Grzhimailo (1824-1870), a sugar and tobacco producer, and his wife Margarita Mikhailovna née Kornilovich. Like his brothers Vladimir and Grigory, Mikhail went to the 3rd St. Petersburg military gymnasium and joined military service in 1878 graduating in 1881 from the Mikhailovsky Artillery School. From 1887 he joined expeditions into the Pamirs along with his brother Grigory. He described his travels and was elected member of the Russian Geographical Society, receiving a Przhevalsky medal in 1891. He taught military geography from 1892 to 1898. He became a commander of the 41st artillery brigade in 1907 and retired the next year. He was however back to service during World War I. He helped develop saddles for the carriage of guns and heavy equipment. He also designed a goniometer for artillery users and camping gear for soldiers. He also developed telephone standards for use in the army. In 1920 he was arrested during the Russian Civil War and in 1921 he was sent to Butyrka prison where he died.
