= Lithosarctia hoenei =

Scientific classification
- Kingdom: Animalia
- Phylum: Arthropoda
- Class: Insecta
- Order: Lepidoptera
- Superfamily: Noctuoidea
- Family: Erebidae
- Subfamily: Arctiinae
- Genus: Lithosarctia
- Species: L. hoenei

Binomial name
- Lithosarctia hoenei Daniel, 1954

Species of moth

Lithosarctia hoenei is a moth of the subfamily Arctiinae. It was described by Franz Daniel in 1954. It is found in Yunnan, China.
