= Micrarctia =

Scientific classification
- Domain: Eukaryota
- Kingdom: Animalia
- Phylum: Arthropoda
- Class: Insecta
- Order: Lepidoptera
- Superfamily: Noctuoidea
- Family: Erebidae
- Subfamily: Arctiinae
- Tribe: Arctiini
- Subtribe: Arctiina
- Genus: Micrarctia; Seitz, 1910
- Species: M. trigona

Binomial name
- Micrarctia trigona (Leech, 1899)

Genus of moths

Micrarctia is a tiger moth genus in the family Erebidae described by Seitz in 1910. The genus currently contains two species. Both species are found in central to western China, including the Chinese provinces of Qinghai and Sichuan.

== Taxonomy ==
In the 20th century, this genus name was used for many small tiger moths from different subtribes, which were later separated into their own genera: Palearctia, Sibirarctia, Sinoarctia, Lithosarctia, Sinowatsonia.

== Species ==
Micrarctia trigona (Leech, 1899)
Micrarctia kautti Saldaitis & Pekarsky, 2015
