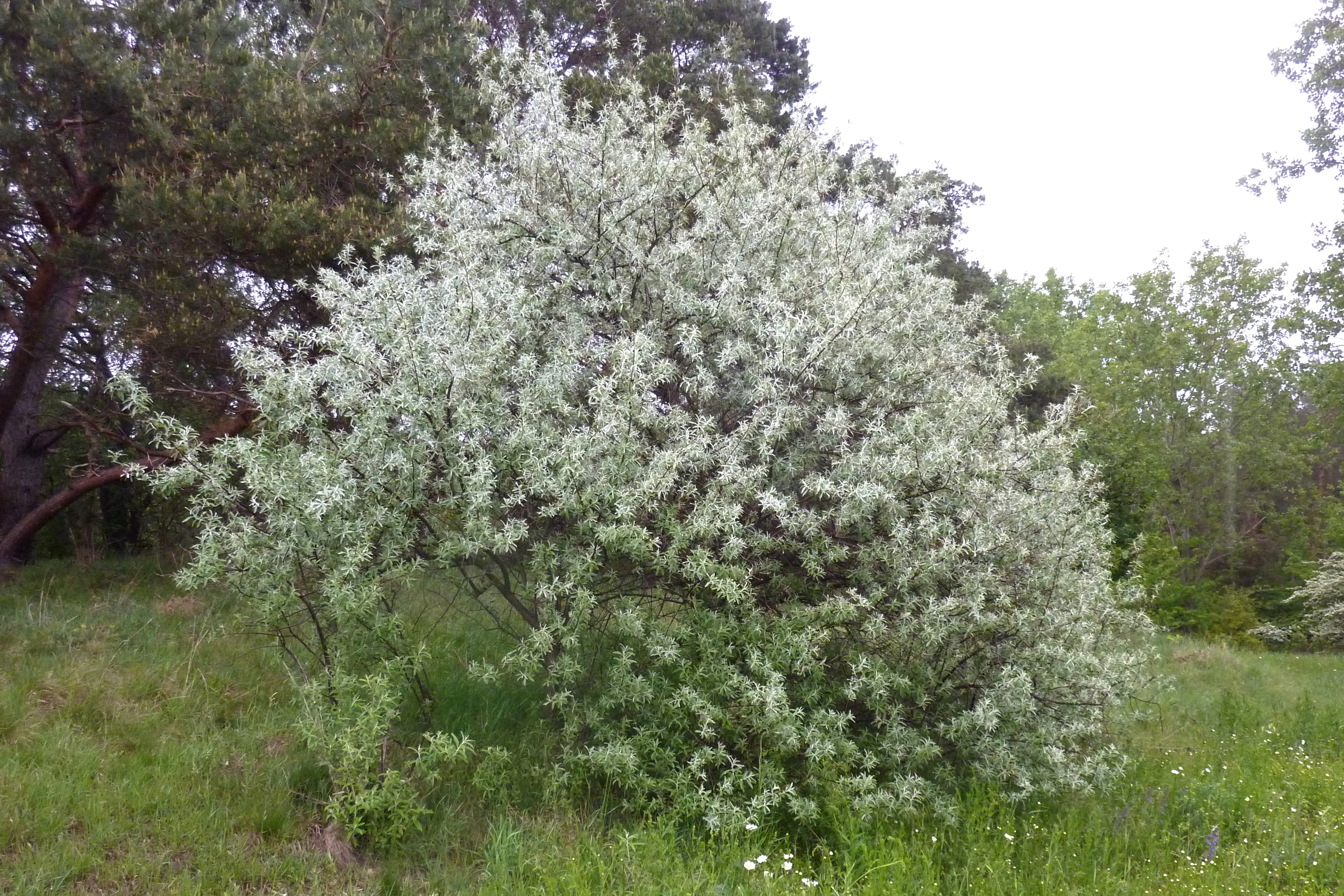

Conservation status
- Least Concern (IUCN 3.1)

Scientific classification
- Kingdom: Plantae
- Clade: Tracheophytes
- Clade: Angiosperms
- Clade: Eudicots
- Clade: Rosids
- Order: Rosales
- Family: Elaeagnaceae
- Genus: Elaeagnus
- Species: E. angustifolia

Binomial name
- Elaeagnus angustifolia L.

Synonyms
- List: Elaeagnus argentea Moench (1794); Elaeagnus caspica (Sosn.) Grossh. (1949); Elaeagnus dactyliformis Schltdl. (1857); Elaeagnus erivanensis Fisch. ex Schltdl. (1857); Elaeagnus hortensis M.Bieb. (1808); Elaeagnus igda (Servett.) Tzvelev (2002); Elaeagnus iliensis (Musch.) Musch. (1966); Elaeagnus incana Lam. (1779); Elaeagnus inermis Mill. (1756); Elaeagnus litoralis (Servett.) Kozlowsk. (1958); Elaeagnus moorcroftii Wall. ex Schltdl. (1860); Elaeagnus orientalis L. (1767); Elaeagnus oxycarpa Schltdl. (1860); Elaeagnus songarica (Bernh. ex Schltdl.) Schltdl. (1860); Elaeagnus spinosa L. (1756); Elaeagnus tifliensis Vis. (1842); Elaeagnus tomentosa Moench (1794); Elaeagnus turcomanica Kozlowsk. (1954)

= Elaeagnus angustifolia =

Species of flowering plant

Elaeagnus angustifolia, commonly called Russian olive, silver berry, oleaster, or wild olive, is a species of Elaeagnus, native to Asia and limited areas of eastern Europe. It is widely established in North America as an introduced species.

== Description ==
Elaeagnus angustifolia is a thorny tree growing to 11 metres (35 feet) in height. Its stems, buds, and leaves have a dense covering of silvery to rusty scales. The leaves are alternate, lanceolate, 4–9 centimetres (1 1/2–3 1/2 inches) long and 1–2.5 cm (3/8–1 in) broad, with a smooth margin. The plants begin to flower and fruit from 3 years old. The highly aromatic flowers, produced in clusters of one to three, are 1 cm long with a four-lobed creamy yellow calyx; they appear in early summer and are followed by clusters of fruit, a small cherry-like drupe 1–1.7 cm (3/8–5/8 in) long, orange-red covered in silvery scales. The fruits are about 1 cm wide and sweet, though with a dryish, mealy texture.

The species is established and reproduced primarily by seed, with some vegetative propagation also occurring. The branches have thorns that can be 2–7 cm (3/4–2 3/4 in) long.

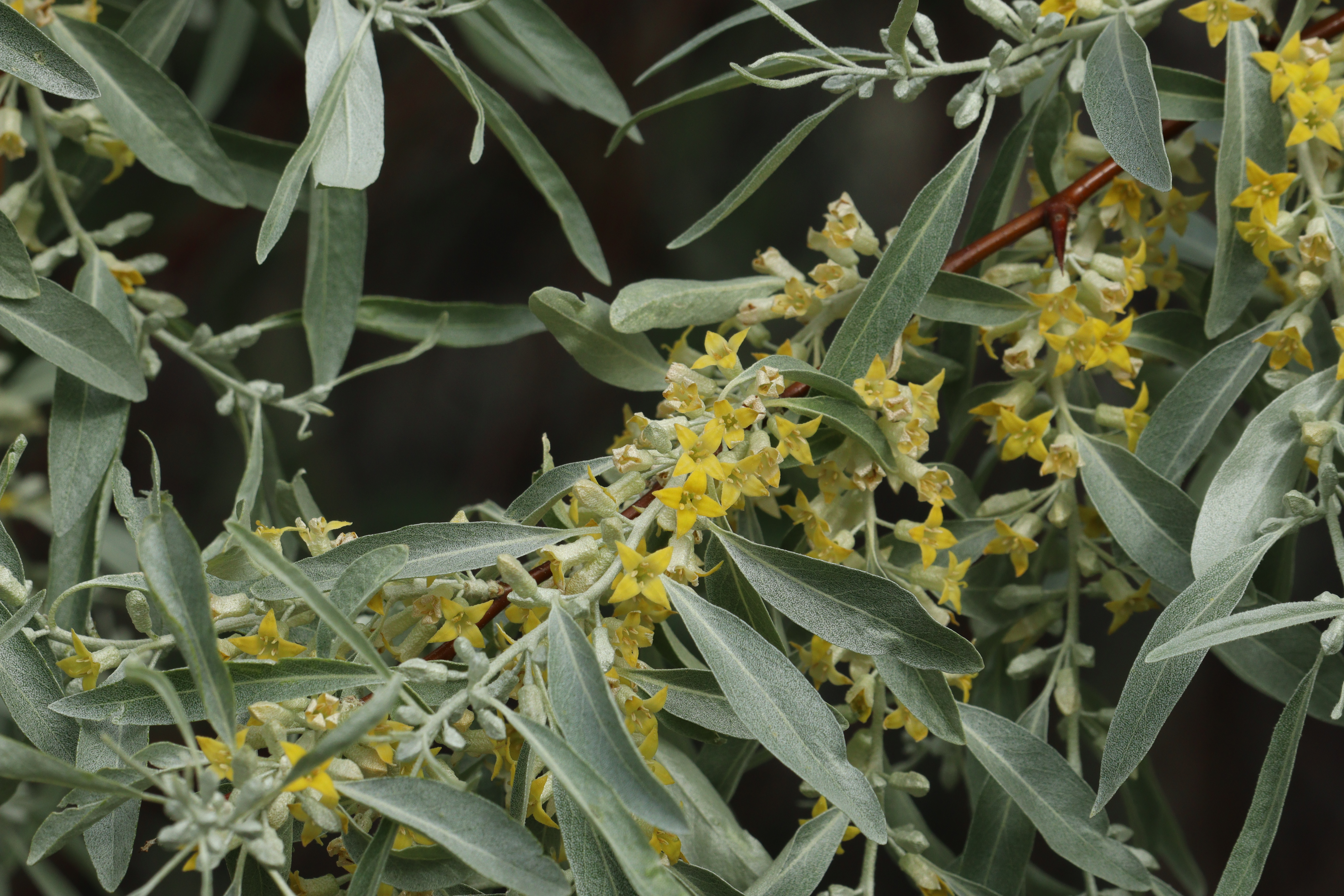
Foliage

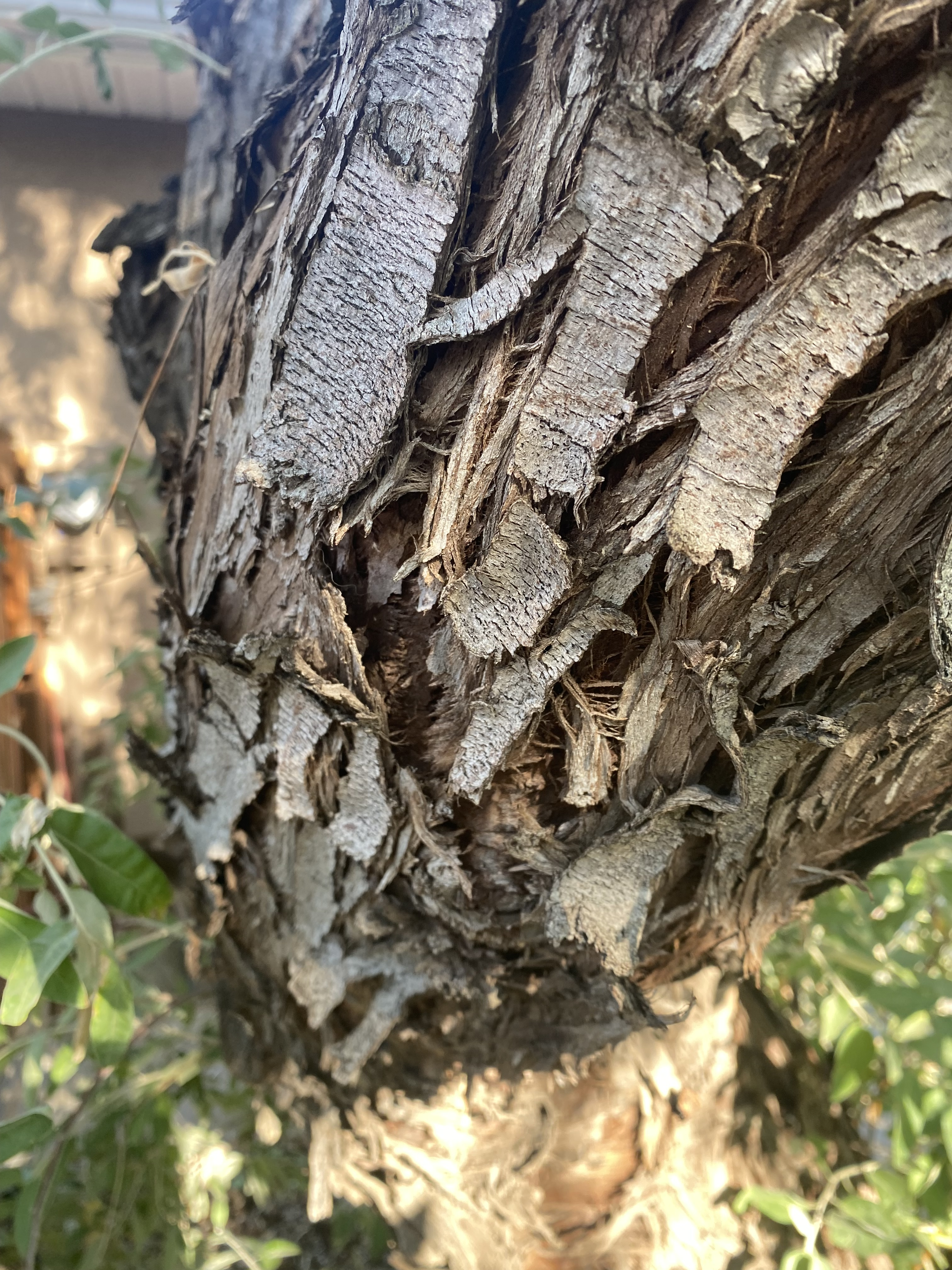
Exfoliating bark on the mature trunk of a Russian olive

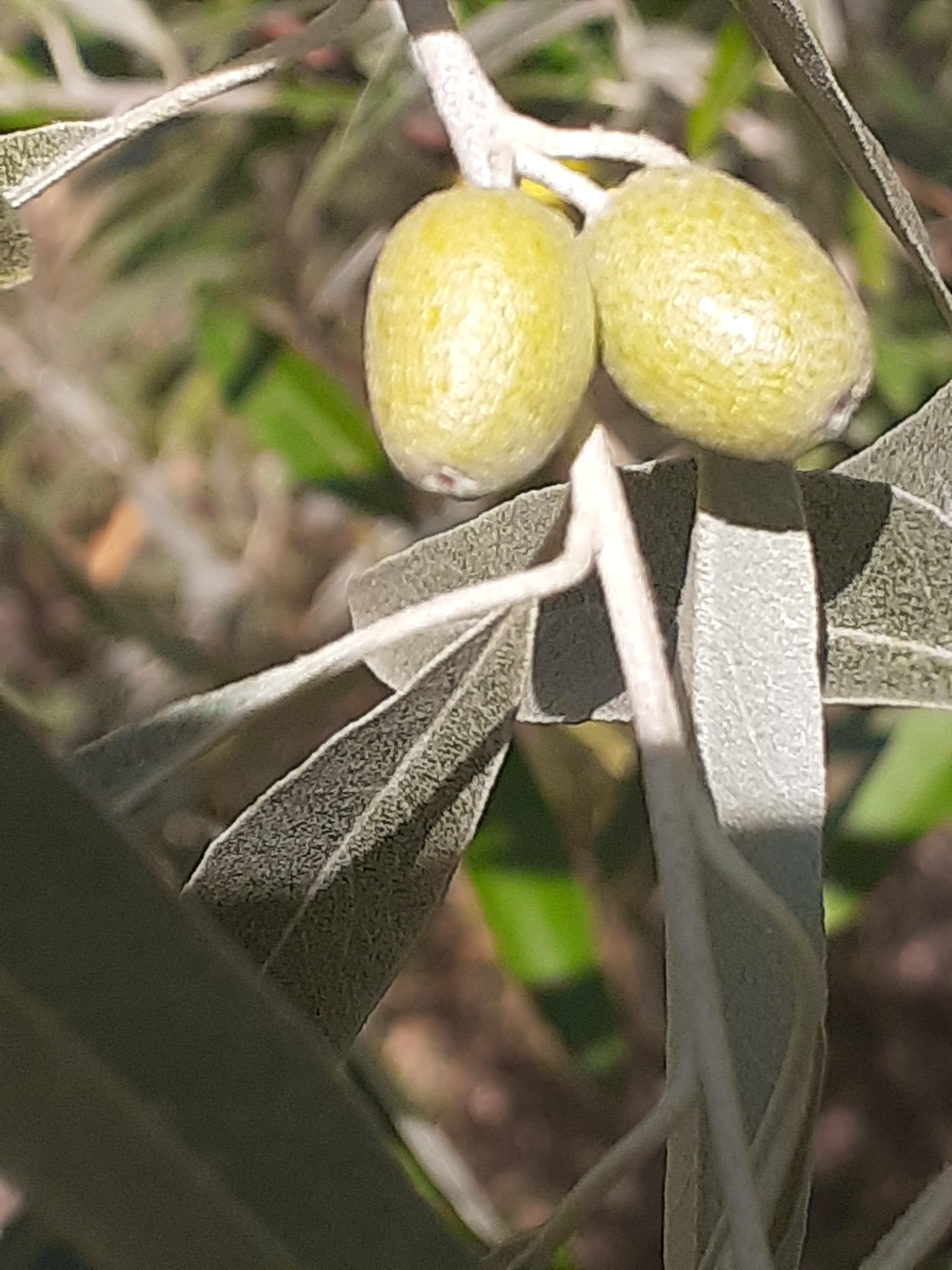
Leaves and fruit close-up

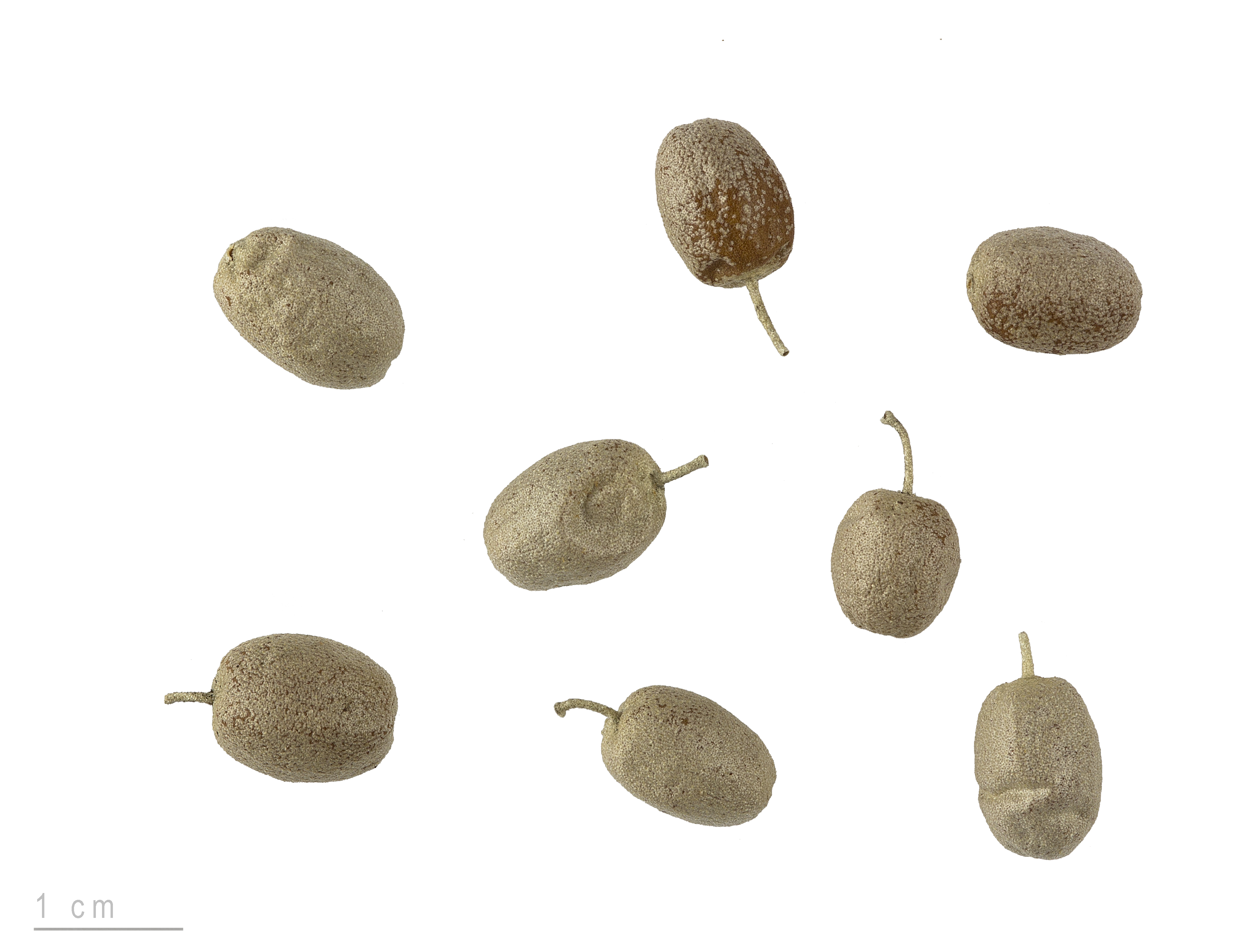
Fruit

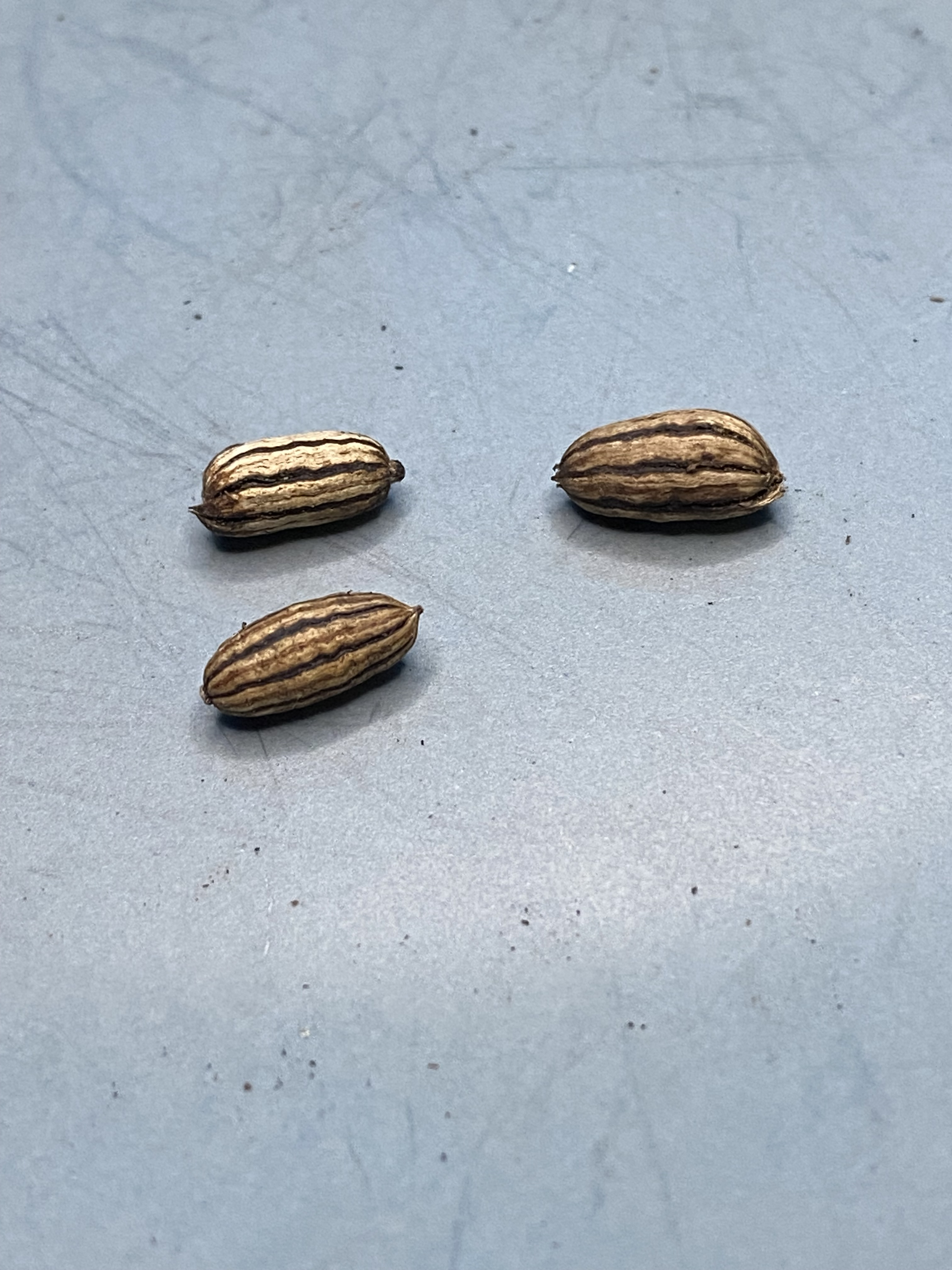
Ribbed stones (endocarps) of Russian olive

== Taxonomy and distribution ==
The first scientific description of Elaeagnus angustifolia was by Carl Linnaeus under its present name in 1753. Its common name comes from its similarity in appearance to the olive (Olea europaea), in a different botanical family, the Oleaceae.

According to Sudnik et al., "Most authors suggest that E. angustifolia originated from the Irano-Turanian region. The species is widely distributed in south-west Asia. In the East its range extends from Kashmir and north-west India to eastern Kazakhstan. The western limit of the species distribution is unclear; the natural character of the tree stands in the lower Volga region (Golub et al. 2002) and Anatolia (Browicz 1996) is questioned."

Further east in Asia, the native range stretches into Afghanistan, Iran, Kazakhstan, Kyrgyzstan, Pakistan, Tajikistan, Turkmenistan, and the nations of the Caucasus. In India they are found in the western Himalayas. There is a disjunct population in Myanmar and Assam in eastern India. They grow natively in Mongolia and in China they are found in the north-central, southeast, Inner Mongolia, Manchuria, Qinghai, and Xinjiang.

== Ecology ==
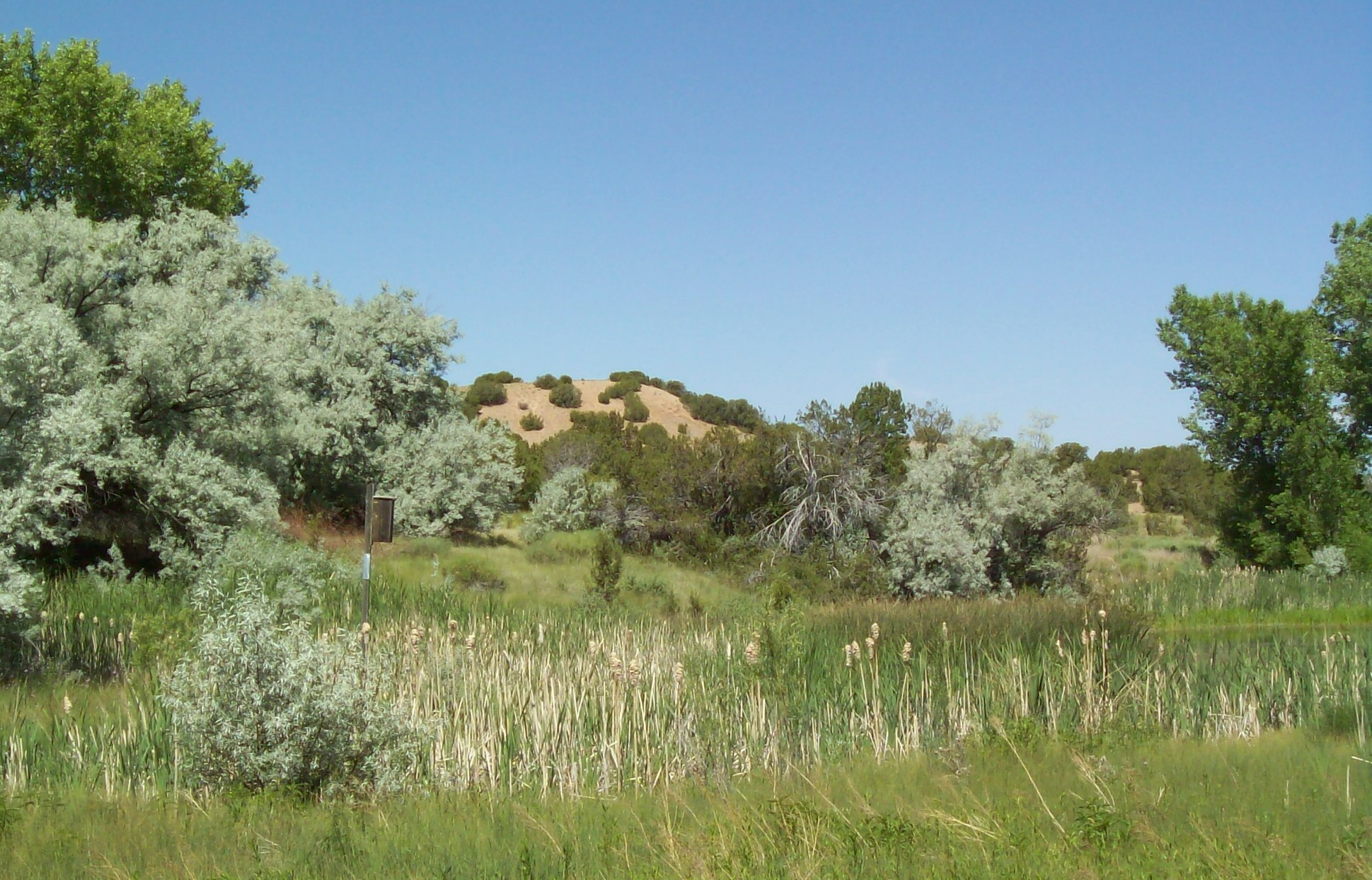
Russian olive invading a rare ciénega in New Mexico, United States

The shrub possesses a high level of salinity tolerance enabling it to grow on bare mineral substrates and poor, eroded soils and environments.

The caterpillars of the high altitude alpine moth Lachana alpherakii use it as a host plant. The fruit is readily eaten and the seeds disseminated by many species of birds.

=== Invasive behavior ===
The species was introduced into North America by the late 19th century, and was both planted and spread through the consumption of its fruits (which seldom ripen in England), by birds, which disperse the seeds. Russian olive is considered to be an invasive species in many places in the United States because it thrives on poor soil, has high seedling survival rates, matures in a few years, and out-competes the native vegetation. It often invades riparian habitats where the canopy of cottonwood trees has died. Its quick-spreading root system can make it pest-like.

== Uses ==
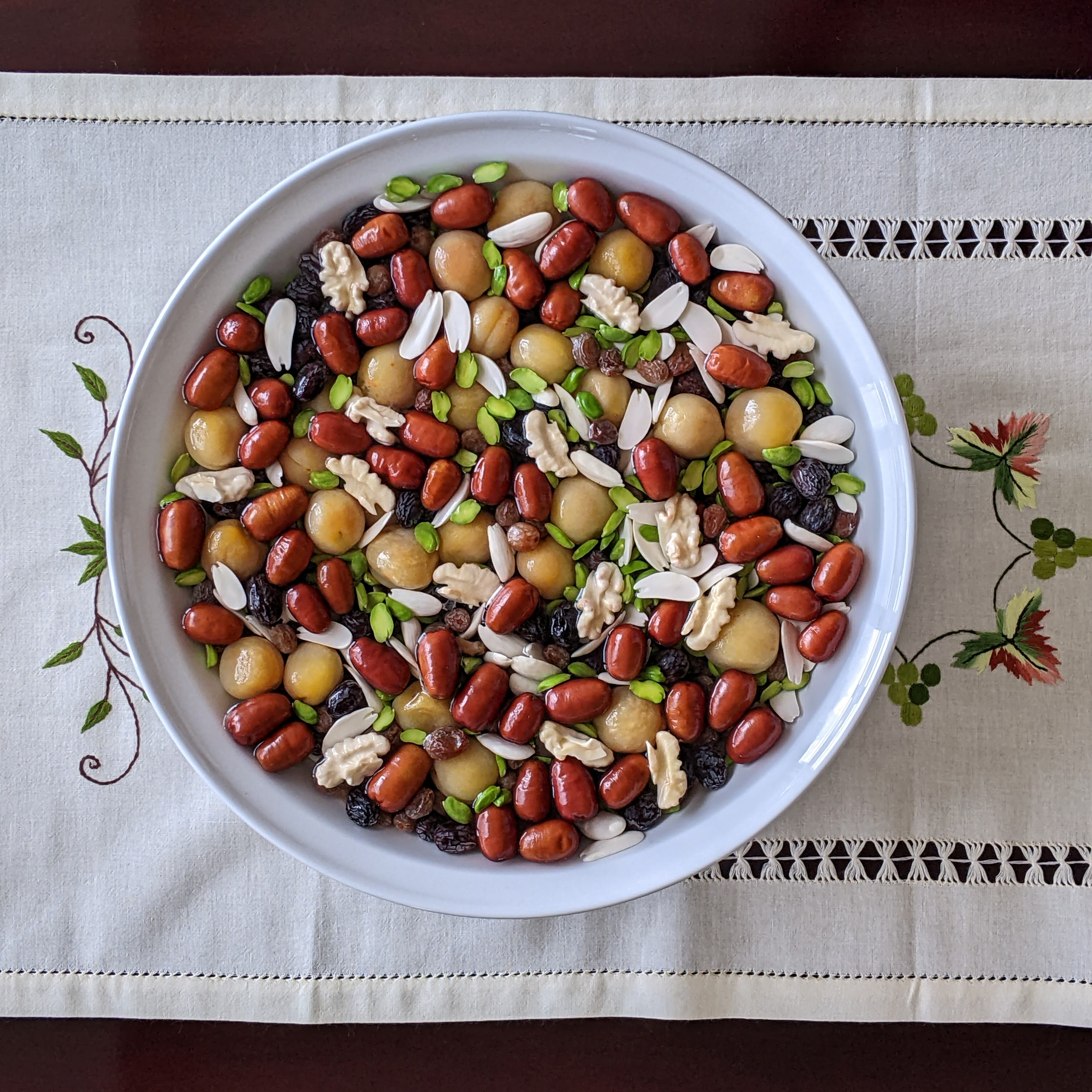
Dried oleaster fruit (senjed) among other fruits as part of haft mēwa, an Afghan dish

It is widely grown across southern and central Europe as a drought- and cold-resistant ornamental plant for its scented flowers, edible fruit, attractive yellow foliage and black bark. It was grown in England by John Parkinson no later than 1633.

In Iran, the dried powder of the fruit is used mixed with milk for rheumatoid arthritis and joint pains. There is evidence supporting beneficial effects of aqueous extract of Persian olive in reducing the symptoms of osteoarthritis with an efficacy comparable to that of acetaminophen and ibuprofen.

It is one of the seven items used in Haft-sin, a traditional table setting of Nowruz, the traditional Persian spring celebration. The dried fruit, known locally as senjed, is one of seven served in its own syrup in a fruit salad called haft mēwa eaten during Nowruz in Afghanistan.

In folk herbalism Russian olive has a wide variety of uses. The leaves, fruit, flowers, and bark are all employed. The leaves are known to help in the gastrointestinal system, assist in wound healing and are used as an antibacterial. The fruit has a wide range of traditional applications, including use as an anti-inflammatory and antioxidant. The flowers are a traditional remedy for fevers, made as an herbal infusion.

In urban settings, landscapers use plantings of Russian olive to discourage people from resting or sleeping in the location.

== Chemistry ==
E. angustifolia contains the alkaloids harmine, harmane, and harmol in the roots and shoot, as well as calligonine in the bark.
