= Lachana ladakensis =

Scientific classification
- Domain: Eukaryota
- Kingdom: Animalia
- Phylum: Arthropoda
- Class: Insecta
- Order: Lepidoptera
- Superfamily: Noctuoidea
- Family: Erebidae
- Genus: Lachana
- Species: L. ladakensis

Binomial name
- Lachana ladakensis Moore, 1888

Species of moth

Lachana ladakensis is a species of moth of the subfamily Lymantriinae. It is found in the mountains of Ladakh, in Kashmir in northwestern India.

== Taxonomy ==
It was described by Frederic Moore in 1888 as the first species of his new monotypic genus Lachana. The holotype is the original specimen studied by Moore and it is kept at the Natural History Museum in London. It remained the only species in Lachana until 2008, when Tatyana A. Trofimova moved three species from Gynaephora to the genus and described a new species.

== Description ==
The wingspan is about 24 mm.

== Distribution ==
Besides the holotype, least four specimens of this species are known, all from three localities in the Ladakh area; one is undated, while the other three were collected in 1980. The only two collection localities published are the high mountain passes of Zoji La (at 4,200 m elevation) and Fotu La (3,700 m).
