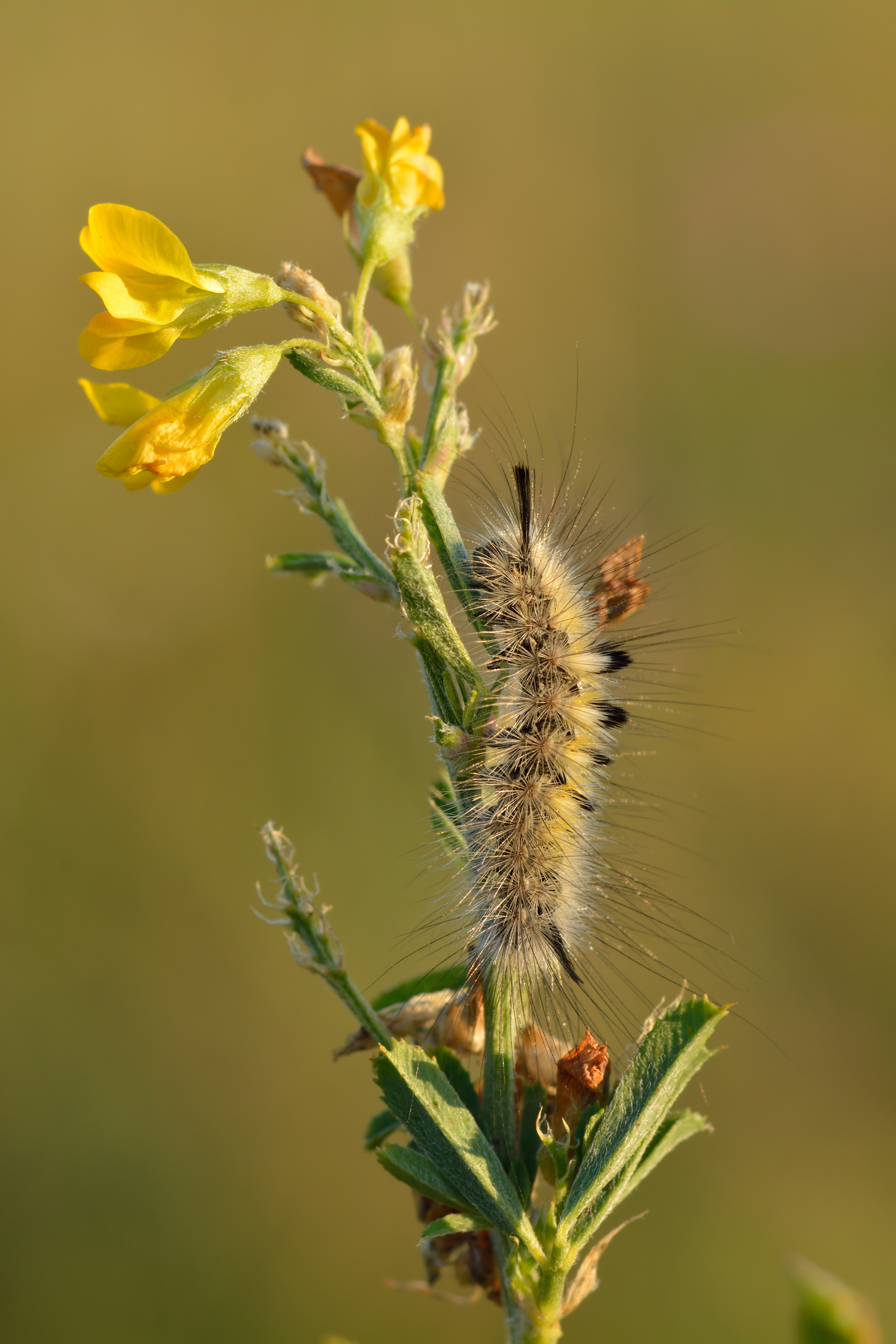

Scientific classification
- Domain: Eukaryota
- Kingdom: Animalia
- Phylum: Arthropoda
- Class: Insecta
- Order: Lepidoptera
- Superfamily: Noctuoidea
- Family: Erebidae
- Genus: Gynaephora
- Species: G. selenitica

Binomial name
- Gynaephora selenitica (Esper, 1789)

Synonyms
- Phalaena selenitica Esper, 1789; Bombyx paradoxa Fabricius, 1787; Bombyx lathyri Hübner, [1803]

= Gynaephora selenitica =

Species of moth

Gynaephora selenitica is a moth in the family Erebidae first described by Eugenius Johann Christoph Esper in 1789. It is found from central Europe through eastern Europe to the Urals and Ob' River in West Siberia. It is not found in western and southern Europe and Scandinavia.

The wingspan is 20–25 mm for males and 30–35 mm for females. Adults are on wing from May to June.

The larvae are polyphagous and feed mainly on Fabaceae species (including Lotus, Coronilla, Hippocrepis and Onobrychis), as well as various shrubs (Prunus spinosa, Salix, Vaccinium, Calluna and Rosa) and other plants (Asteraceae, Rosaceae including Potentilla). Larvae can be found from July to April. The species overwinters in the larval stage.

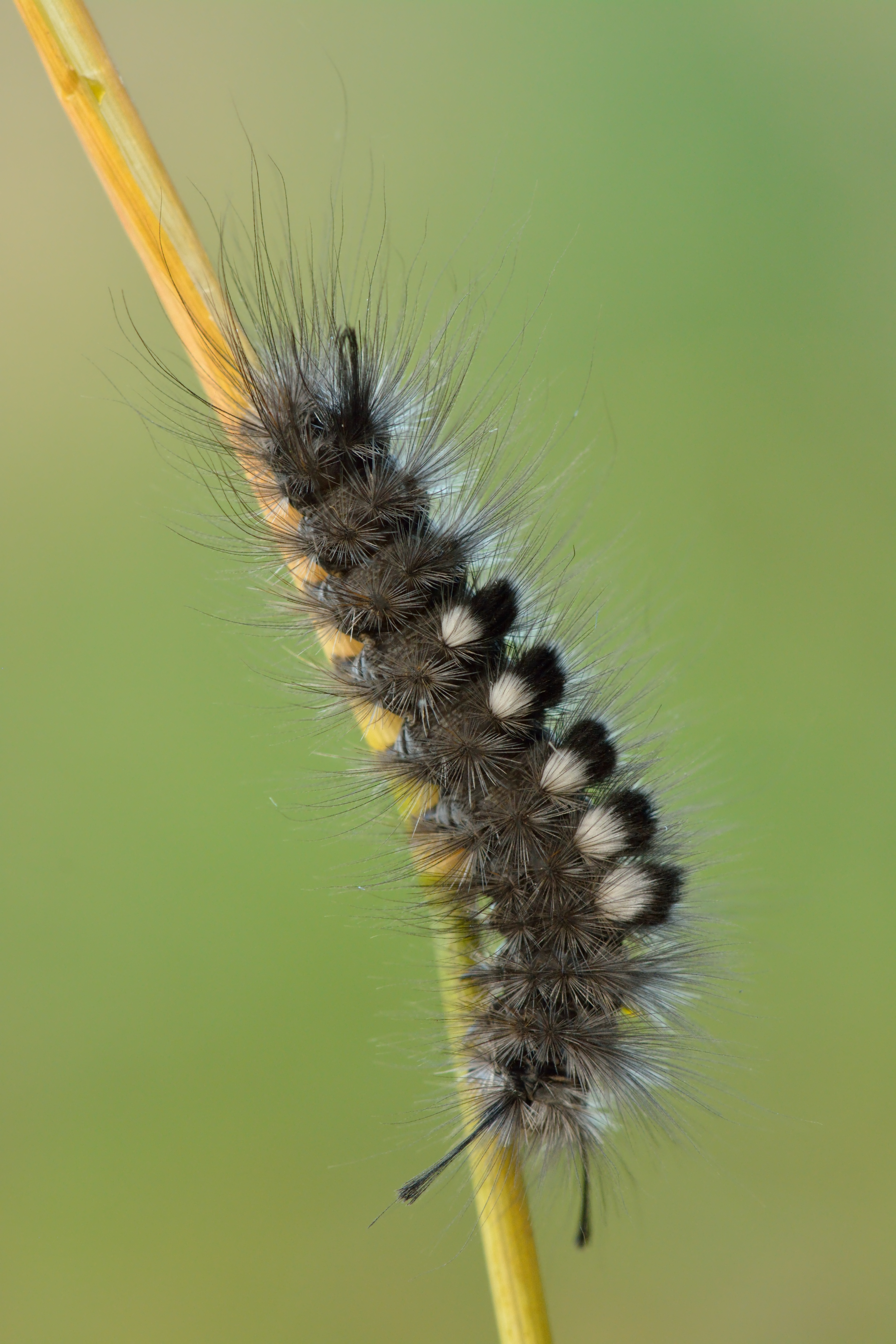
Caterpillar

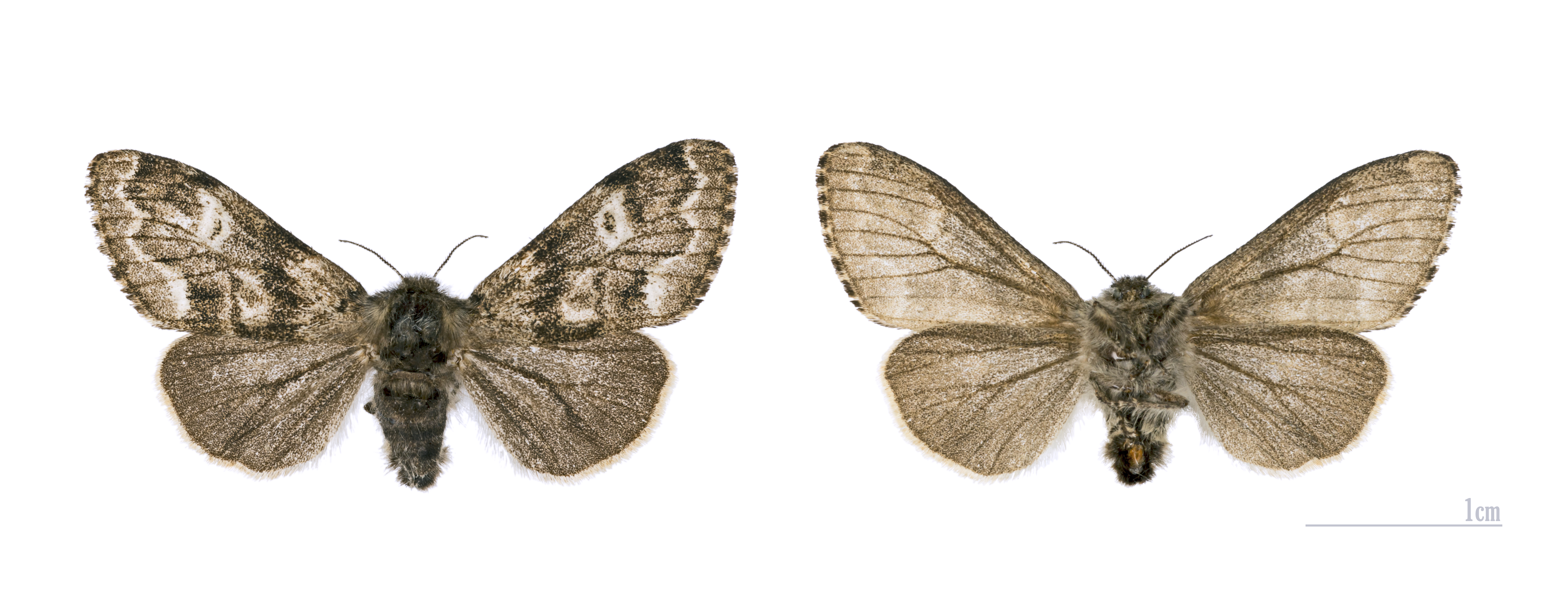
Female

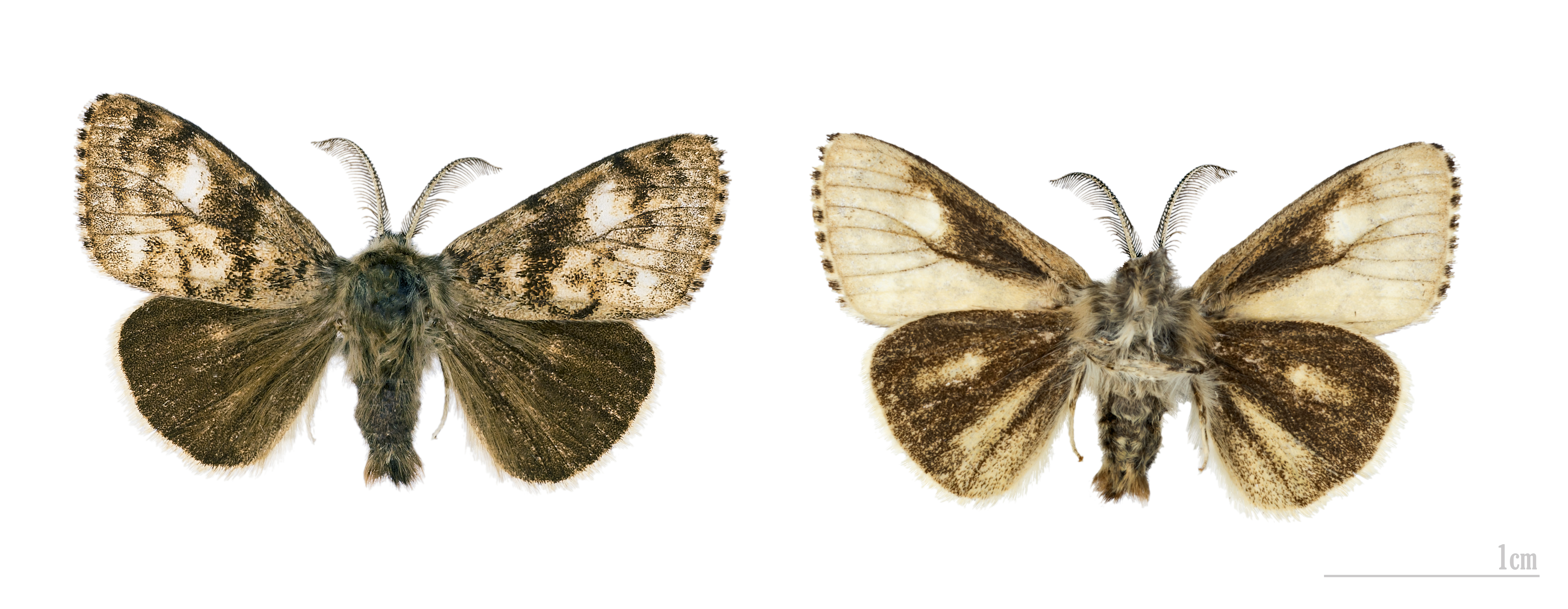
Male
