= Lithosarctia =

Scientific classification
- Domain: Eukaryota
- Kingdom: Animalia
- Phylum: Arthropoda
- Class: Insecta
- Order: Lepidoptera
- Superfamily: Noctuoidea
- Family: Erebidae
- Subfamily: Arctiinae
- Subtribe: Spilosomina
- Genus: Lithosarctia; Daniel, 1954

Type species
- Lithosarctia hoenei Daniel, 1954

Synonyms
- Ocnogynodes Dubatolov, 1987

Genus of moths

Lithosarctia is a genus of tiger moths in the family Erebidae. The genus was erected by Franz Daniel in 1954. The moths in the genus are from western China and Himalayas.

== Species ==
- Lithosarctia hoenei Daniel, 1954

=== Subgenus Ocnogynodes Dubatolov, 1987 ===
- Lithosarctia goergneri de Freina & Witt, 1994
- Lithosarctia kozlovi Dubatolov, 2002
- Lithosarctia thomasi de Freina & Witt, 1994
- Lithosarctia y-albulum (Oberthür, 1886)
