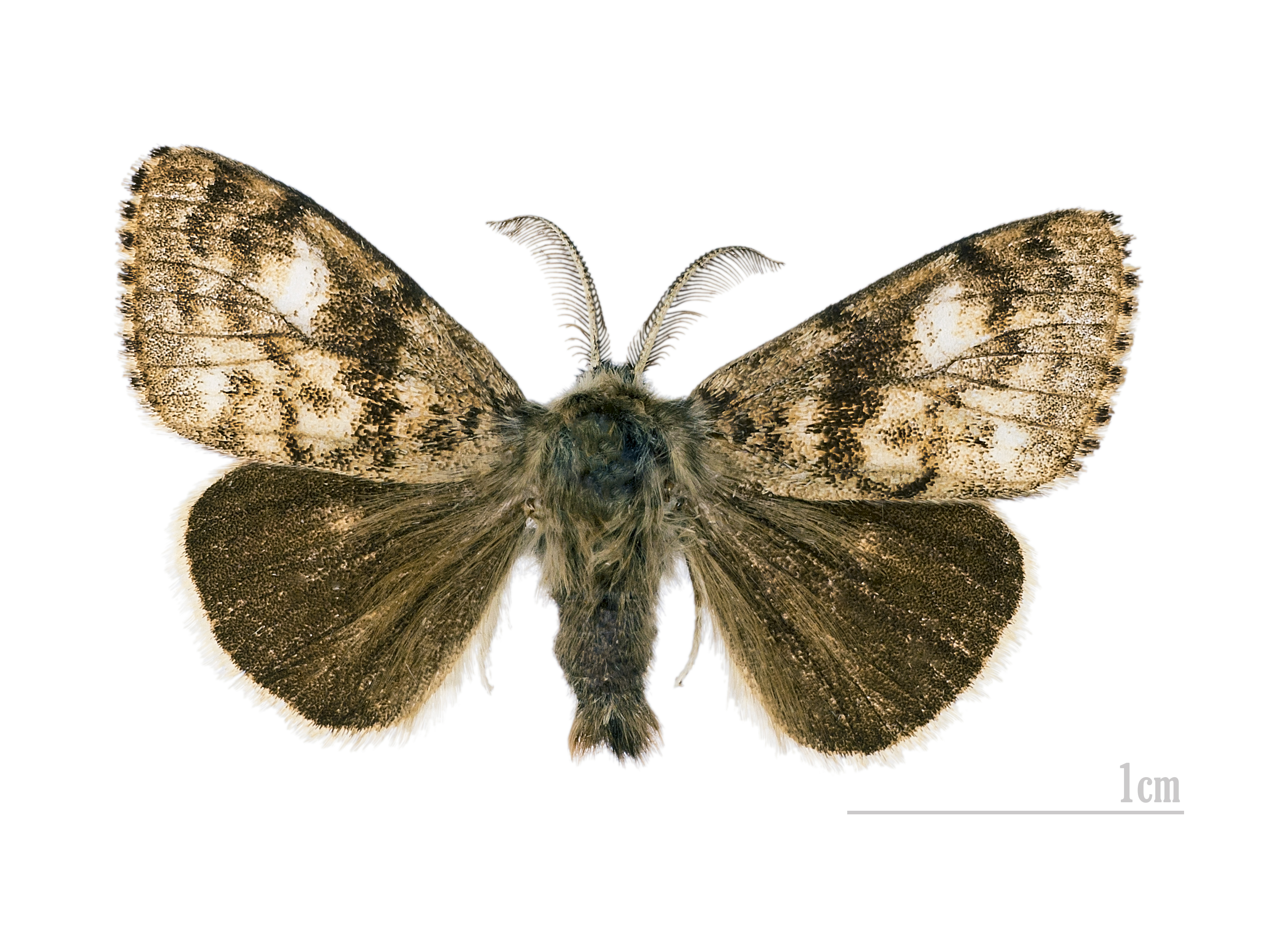
- Gynaephora selenitica

Scientific classification
- Kingdom: Animalia
- Phylum: Arthropoda
- Class: Insecta
- Order: Lepidoptera
- Superfamily: Noctuoidea
- Family: Erebidae
- Tribe: Orgyiini
- Genus: Gynaephora; Hübner, 1819

Synonyms
- Cladophora Geyer, 1832; Gynophora Agassiz, 1847, lapsus; Byrdia Schaus, 1927; Konokareha Matsumura, 1928

= Gynaephora =

Genus of moths

Gynaephora is a genus of "tussock moths", also known as the Lymantriinae, within the family Erebidae. They are mainly found in the Holarctic in alpine, Arctic and Subarctic regions, and are best known for their unusually long larval development period. The life-cycle of Gynaephora groenlandica was once believed to take fourteen years, but subsequent studies reduced it to seven, still a very slow development rate that is extremely rare in the Lepidoptera. The caterpillars have five instars, with each instar lasting a year.

== Taxonomy ==
The European species Gynaephora selenitica was the first described (as Phalaena selenitica). It was moved to Gynaephora by Jakob Hübner in 1819 and subsequently designated as type species by William Forsell Kirby in 1892. In Kirby's time there were three species recognised in the genus: G. selenitica, G. pluto (now Xylophanes pluto) and G. xerampelina (now Aroa xerampelina).

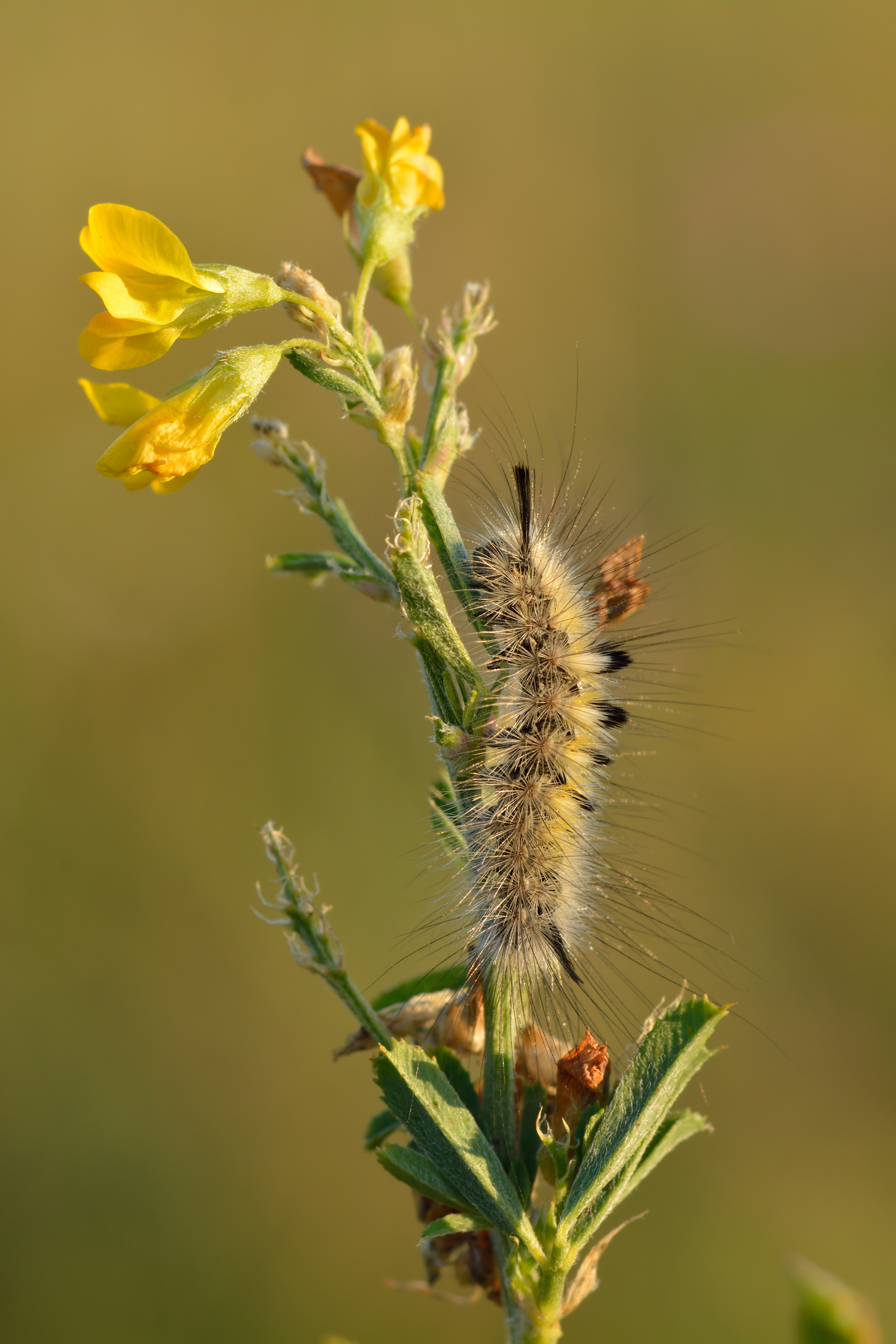
A hairy caterpillar of Gynaephora selenitica on Medicago falcata (yellow alfalfa) near Valkse, northwestern Estonia.

Laria rossii had been described by Curtis from the Canadian archipelago in 1835, but in 1870 Heinrich Benno Möschler moved it to the genus Dasychira. In 1874 a second Arctic Dasychira species was described by Maximilian Ferdinand Wocke from northern Greenland: D. groenlandica. In 1927 William Schaus moved both to the genus Byrdia.

Dasychira pumila was described by Otto Staudinger in 1881. He also commented that he found this new taxon distinctive enough to be classified in a new genus, which he provisionally suggested naming Dasyorgyia. William Forsell Kirby validated this name in 1882, classifying a number of species as Dasyorgyia, and in 1901 Staudinger published the species under the name Dasyorgyia pumila along with four other species: D. alpherakii, D. grumi, D. selenophora and D. semenovi. Embrik Strand in 1910 or 1912, and Felix Bryk in 1934 followed Staudinger, but in 1950 Igor Vasilii Kozhanchikov moved D. pumila to Gynaephora, and also named a new species G. sincera. In 1978 these and two other species, G. alpherakii and G. selenophora, were classified by Douglas C. Ferguson in a subgenus using Otto Staudinger's 1881 alternative name Dasyorgyia with as type species G. pumila.

Chou Io and Ying Chiang-Chu described four new species from China in 1979: G. aureata, G. minora, G. qinghaiensis and G. ruoergensis, with their paper written in Chinese.

In 1984 Karel Spitzer reviewed the genus, recording three species in the genus sensu stricto (the nominate subgenus Gynaephora): G. groenlandica, G. rossii and G. selenitica. In subgenus Dasyorgyia he classified seven species: G. alpherakii, G. aureata, G. minora, G. pumila, G. qinghaiensis, G. selenophora and G. sincera, having synonymised G. ruoergensis with G. selenophora (now Lachana selenophora).

In 2008 Tatyana A. Trofimova moved Gynaephora pumila to Dicallomera, and as this was the type species for the subgenus Dasyorgyia, she was obliged to look into the other species of the subgenus. She moved G. alpherakii, G. selenophora and G. sincera to the genus Lachana, but refrained from making a decision regarding the newer Chinese taxa.

=== Etymology ===
According to one website, the generic epithet Gynaephora means 'women-seeker', which refers to the behaviour of the males. Females rarely or do not fly, but are said to "call out" to the males. Males fly rapidly searching for the females. However, the word gynaephora in fact means 'women-bringer' or 'bringer-of-woman'; it is compounded from the Greek γυνή (guní), meaning "woman", and φορά (phorá), usually meaning "bringer" (along with some other related meanings).

It has been placed in the tribe Orgyiini, which is in the subfamily Lymantriinae (the tussock moths).

== Description ==
Of the species in this genus sensu stricto, the males have a thin aedeagus. The females of species of this genus, sensu stricto, of all the species in which they have been seen, lack wings and are flightless. The caterpillars of the species in this genus sensu stricto are large and very hairy.

== Species ==
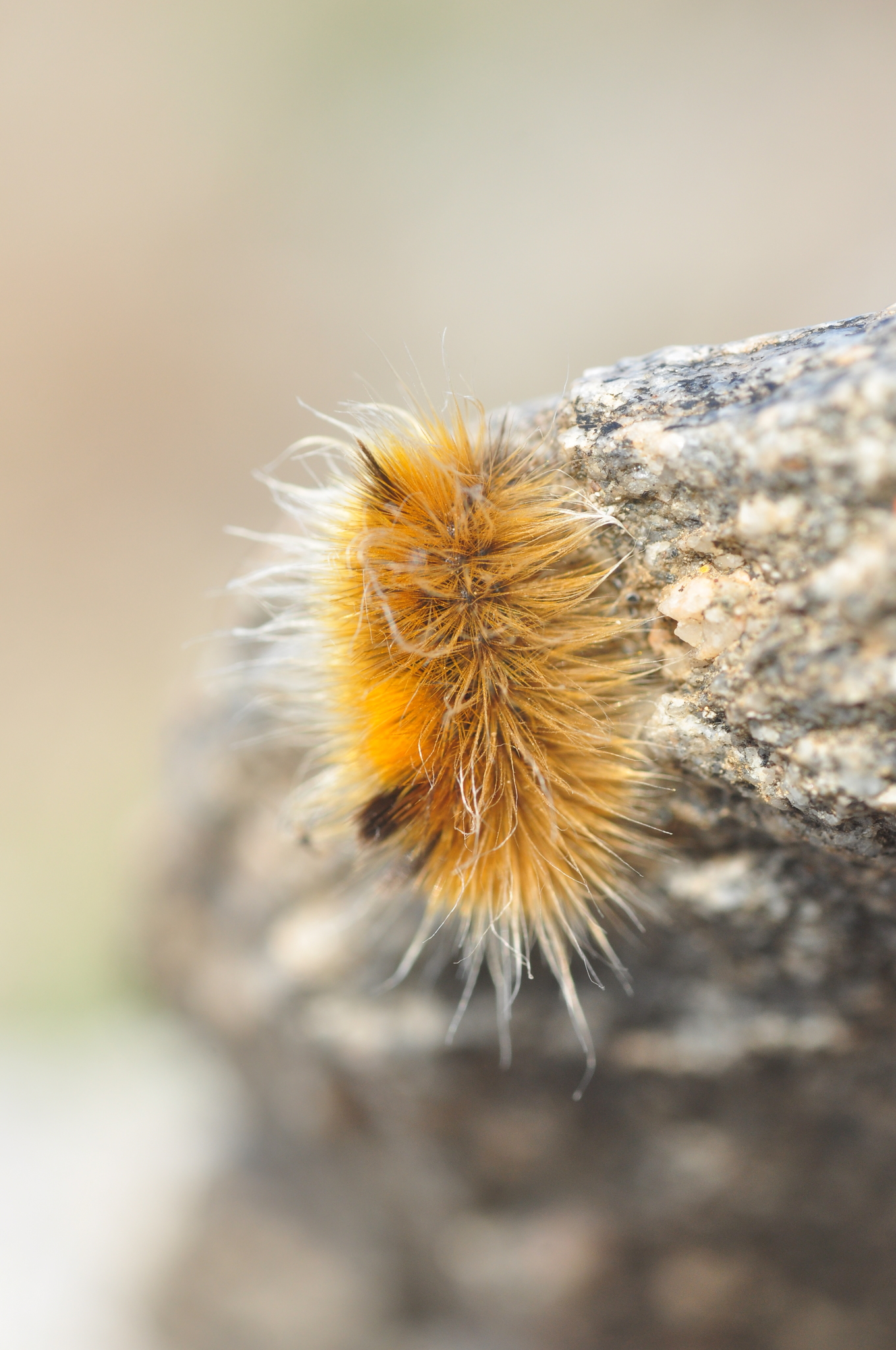
A woolly caterpillar of Gynaephora groenlandica.

- Gynaephora selenitica (Esper, 1789)
- Gynaephora rossii (Curtis, 1835)
- Gynaephora groenlandica (Wocke, 1874)

Sometimes the alpine populations of Asia of Gynaephora rossii are recognised as an independent species: G. relictus (O.Bang-Haas, 1927). G. lugens from the far north of eastern Russia was recognised as an independent species until 2015, when it was made into a subspecies of G. rossii.

There is furthermore a group of species from the Tibet-Qinghai Plateau belonging to the former subgenus Dasyorgyia.

- Gynaephora aureata Chou & Ying, 1979
- Gynaephora jiuzhiensis
- Gynaephora menyuanensis Yan & Chou, 1997
- Gynaephora minora Chou & Ying, 1979
- Gynaephora qinghaiensis Chou & Ying, 1979
- Gynaephora qumalaiensis
- Gynaephora ruoergensis Chou & Ying, 1979

In 1984 Spitzer synonymised G. ruoergensis with Lachana selenophora. He found Gynaephora qinghaiensis to be a probable synonym of Lachana alpherakii, although he was unable to be certain of this. Both Lachana species were classified as Gynaephora species at this point. In 2008 Trofimova published her opinion that G. aureata, G. minora, G. qinghaiensis and G. ruoergensis, all described from China by Chou and Ying in 1979, are possibly synonyms of Lachana alpherakii, although not having been able to study the type specimens, she was unable to confirm her suspicions. A study of DNA markers of the species of the genus Gynaephora, which was published in 2015, found them allied closer to the outgroup Lachana alpherakii, and likely should be moved to Lachana.

== Ecology ==
These are all alpine or Arctic species.
