= Dicallomera pumila =

Scientific classification
- Domain: Eukaryota
- Kingdom: Animalia
- Phylum: Arthropoda
- Class: Insecta
- Order: Lepidoptera
- Superfamily: Noctuoidea
- Family: Erebidae
- Genus: Dicallomera
- Species: D. pumila

Binomial name
- Dicallomera pumila (Staudinger, 1881)

Synonyms
- Dasychira pumila Staudinger, 1881; Dasorgyia pumila Staudinger ex. Kirby, 1882; Gynaephora pumila (Staudinger, 1881)

Species of moth

Dicallomera pumila is a little seen species of moth of the family Erebidae found in mountains in Kazakhstan and in the southern Urals.

== Taxonomy ==
Until this century, only four caterpillars of this species had ever been found. These were collected near Lake Zaysan in Kazakhstan in the late 19th century and raised to adulthood: becoming two males and two females. These type specimens were transported to Germany and are now in the Museum für Naturkunde der Humboldt Universität in Berlin. Here Otto Staudinger studied them, publishing a description of the species in 1881, and placing it in the genus Dasychira, although he concluded his description with a statement that should it be reclassified in the future, he proposed the name Dasorgyia for a new monotypic genus for it. The females having shortened wings, he believed they were likely inadequately raised.

In 1950, based on photographs of the type specimens in Berlin, Igor Vasilii Kozhanchikov moved the species to the genus Gynaephora in his work on the Orgyidae moths of the Soviet Union, having perceived a spur on the 5th tibia, which he deemed characteristic for that genus, which he further expanded with what he thought was a new Siberian species, G. lugens. It was eventually grouped with a number of high altitude mountain species from the Central Asian parts of the Soviet Union, the Tibet-Qinghai Plateau and the Himalayas in the subgenus Dasorgyia, such as by Karel Spitzer in his 1984 review of the genus Gynaephora.

Tatyana A. Trofimova found a caterpillar in the southern Urals, which she raised into a male moth and eventually identified as a specimen of this species. In 2008 she published a revision of the taxonomy, identifying not one, but two spurs on the 5th tibia. This, and other morphological traits such as the pattern of wing venation, led her to classify the species in the genus Dicallomera. Because D. pumila was also the type species for this subgenus Dasorgyia, this move also required the negation of the subgenus, with the remainder of the species transferred by her to the hitherto monotypic genus Lachana.

== Description ==
It is unclear in this species if the females lack wings altogether or are "brachypterous", have shortened wings. Only two very old specimens are known, as of 2008.

The wingspan is about 26 mm.

== Distribution ==
It is known from Lake Zaysan (in eastern Kazakhstan), the Kokshetau Mountains (in northern Kazakhstan) and the southern Ural Mountains (in Russia).

== Ecology ==
It is found in mountains. The food plants are unknown, but a mature larva was collected on a stem of the grass Koeleria cristata. The males fly during the day from the second half of June to early August.
