= Gynaephora rossii =

Scientific classification
- Kingdom: Animalia
- Phylum: Arthropoda
- Class: Insecta
- Order: Lepidoptera
- Superfamily: Noctuoidea
- Family: Erebidae
- Genus: Gynaephora
- Species: G. rossii

Binomial name
- Gynaephora rossii (Curtis, 1835)

Synonyms
- Laria rossii Curtis, 1835; Dasychira rossii (Curtis, 1835) Möschler, 1870; Byrdia rossii (Curtis, 1835) Schaus, 1927; Dasychira rossii relictus O. Bang-Haas, 1927; Konokareha daisetsuzana Matsumura, 1928; Gynaephora lugens Kozhanchikov, 1948; Byrdia rossii relictus (O. Bang-Haas, 1927) Inoue, 1956; Byrdia rossii daisetsuzana (Matsumura, 1928) Inoue, 1956

Species of moth

Gynaephora rossii, in English known as Ross' tussock moth, is a species of tussock moth in the family Erebidae. It is widespread in the tundras and highlands of the Holarctic. It has large, furry caterpillars which seem to eat mostly saxifrages.

== Taxonomy ==
This moth was first described in 1835 by John Curtis as Laria rossii, who placed it in the genus Laria described by Franz von Paula Schrank in 1802; the genus Laria, however, had already been used in 1763 for a genus of beetles by Scolipi (now Pria), so the species required moving to another genus. Heinrich Benno Möschler first moved it to the genus Dasychira in his 1870 work on the moths of Labrador. Otto Staudinger also classified it in the genus Dasychira in 1901, but in 1927 William Schaus moved it to the genus Byrdia. Also in 1927 Otto Bang-Haas described the subspecies Dasychira rossii relictus from the eastern Sayan Mountains. A year later, in 1928, Shōnen Matsumura described Konokareha daisetsuzana from a single specimen from the Daisetsu mountains in Hokkaido, but in 1932 Max Gaede synonymised Konokareha daisetsuzana to Dasychira rossii relictus. In 1956 Hiroshi Inoue subsumed Konokareha daisetsuzana as an independent subspecies under Byrdia rossii instead, and moved the relictus subspecies to the Byrdia genus as well, giving three subspecies including the nominate. Inoue states, however, that although he finds the type of Konokareha daisetsuzana distinctive enough, his own just collected specimen, in his time only the second moth of this species ever found in Japan, was almost identical to the nominate form, and that he found the validity of the taxon potentially untenable.

Gynaephora lugens was described by Igor Vasilii Kozhanchikov in 1948 from northern Siberia in eastern Russia. Dubatolov published an article in 1997 in which he mentioned doubting the taxonomic distinctiveness of G. lugens from G. rossii, based on the identical wing pattern and the morphology of the genitalia. In 2015 Lukhtanov and Khruleva subsumed it under G. rossii as a subspecies based on DNA and morphological research.

It has been placed in the subfamily Lymantriinae (the tussock moths) and the tribe Orgyiini.

=== Etymology ===
According to one website the generic epithet Gynaephora means 'women-seeker', which refers to the behaviour of the males. However, the word gynaephora in fact means 'women-bringer' or 'bringer-of-woman'; it is compounded from the Greek γυνή (guní), meaning "woman", and φορά (phorá), usually meaning "bringer" (along with some other related meanings). The specific epithet commemorates John Ross who lead the Arctic expedition for which John Curtis served as an entomologist.

=== Subspecies ===
There are two subspecies recorded as accepted in The Global Lepidoptera Names Index (LepIndex) belonging to the species Gynaephora rossii as of 2011:

- Gynaephora rossii rossii: From North America.
- Gynaephora rossii relictus (O.Bang-Haas, 1927): From Asia. It is sometimes recognised as an independent species.

These subspecies are not necessarily recognised:

- Gynaephora rossii daisetsuzana (Matsumura, 1928): A subjective subspecies according to the LepIndex. Native to Hokkaido.
- Gynaephora rossii lugens (Kozhanchikov, 1948) Lukhtanov & Khruleva, 2015: As of 2019, this subspecies is too new to have been added to the LepIndex database. From throughout northern Russia east of the Urals to the Bering Sea.

== Description ==
The females have a forewing length of 17 mm, the males slightly smaller. The hindwings of the males are a light ochre yellow, with a dark gray band along the edge of the wing, and a light amount of hairs extending from that edge (fringe). The hindwings of the females are dark brownish grey and also have a band. Both sexes have mottled grey forewings with jagged black lines across them. There is further a small black disc-shaped dot surrounded by paler grey, and a black and pale grey mark near the end similar to the mark in other Orgyiini. The antenna has teeth- or comb-like structures on both sides, these are larger in males.

The eggs are around 1.4 mm.

The caterpillars are densely covered in soft grey hairs and have seven pairs of tufts of yellow hair on their back, while most other Lymantriinae have five pairs of tufts.

The cocoon is made of silk, incorporating the hairs of the caterpillars on the outside, and is about the size of the cocoon of a common silkworm, oval-shaped and coloured grey.

=== Similar species ===
It is most likely to be confused in British Columbia with Polia richardsoni, which has wings of a similar colour and is in flight at the same month as this moth. That species has a different wing pattern, hair on its eyes and a much thinner antenna. They can be distinguished from their congener Gynaephora groenlandica in the larvae by the form of their hairs, which are finer and feather-like (plumose) in contrast to stiffer and un-branched (spinulose) hairs. G. rossii imagos (adults) have more patterned wings than G. groenlandica and G. groenlandica lack the broad, dark band along the edge of their hind wings characteristic of G. rossii. The two species are sympatric in Arctic areas in northern Canada and the Canadian archipelago, and on Wrangel Island in Russia. The eggs are somewhat smaller and the cocoons of this species are single-layered, as opposed to the double-layered cocoons of G. groenlandica.

== Distribution ==
=== Gynaephora rossii rossii ===
The nominate subspecies occurs in the United States and Canada, In the United States it occurs in Alaska, and isolated populations occur on mountaintops in the Rocky Mountains and the Appalachians. Alpine populations occur in Maine (at the top of Mount Katahdin), in the White Mountains of New Hampshire, Wyoming and Colorado. There is also a specimen from Michigan.

In Canada it is known from Labrador, Yukon (far northern coast and the Richardson Mountains), Northwest Territories (North Slave Region, Fort Smith, Ulukhaktok), Mackenzie County in far northern Alberta, northern Manitoba (outside the town of Churchill), British Columbia (Pink Mountain and the north) and Nunavut (Somerset Island, Bylot Island, north to coasts on central Ellesmere Island).

It has been recorded from northernmost Alaska in Point Barrow, along the Meade River and elsewhere in Alaska North Slope, and southwards in Lake and Peninsula, the Darby Mountains, the city of Fairbanks, and alpine areas in Kenai National Wildlife Refuge. In Colorado it has been recorded in Clear Creek County, Teller County (Florissant) and Rocky Mountain National Park. In New Hampshire it has been found in Coös County in the village of Jefferson and on Mount Washington.

=== Gynaephora rossii relictus ===
This taxon was originally described from the eastern Sayan Mountains, while the taxon daisetsuzana, now considered a synonym, was only known from the mountains of Hokkaido in Japan. It has also been recorded from the mountains of Buryatia and at low elevations in Chukotka Autonomous Okrug. G. rossii lugens, sometimes considered a synonym of the previous subspecies, occurs in Russia from the Siberian Arctic from the northern Urals and the Yamal Peninsula eastwards to the Chukchi Peninsula, north to the Arctic Ocean and on Wrangel Island. Southwards it is only found in mountainous areas such as in the Suntar-Khayata Range (eastern Yakutia), the mountains of southern Yakutia and southwest Irkutsk Oblast, the Yablonoi Mountains of Chita Oblast, and mountains in the northern regions of Amur Oblast, in Kamchatka and in northern Magadan Oblast along the upper reaches of the Kolyma River.

== Ecology ==
=== Habitat ===
This day-flying moth is found in tundras in Arctic and Subarctic areas. It also occurs in rocky alpine tundra habitats on top of high mountains, and has been caught flying in muskeg habitat with trees growing in it in Canada. It is able to survive in extreme environments such as at 2,200 m above sea level in the Suntar-Khayata Range or at 2,400 m in Buryatia. It has been recorded at altitudes of 1,561 m in Coös County, New Hampshire, at 800 m in the Richardson Mountains, Yukon, Canada, and at 300 m in Chukotka Autonomous Okrug, Russia.

=== Behaviour ===
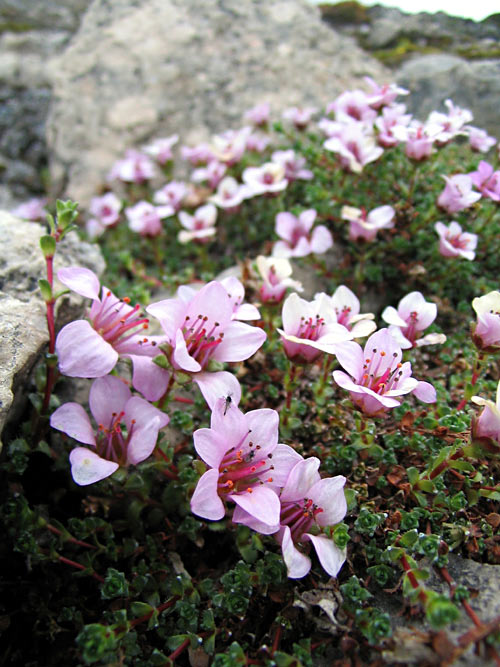
Saxifraga oppositifolia is a primary host plant of the caterpillars in Nunavut.

The females have fully developed wings and can fly, although they usually do not, but are said to "call out" to the males. This allows the female to save energy. The males are slightly smaller than the females. Males fly rapidly searching for the females during daylight, and are difficult to catch unless waiting near a "calling" female. They are usually on the wing in July in northern British Columbia, although this can depend on the weather and if the snow has melted. On Somerset Island in Nunavut the moths and their caterpillars would appear in large numbers for one or two days in June. In North America as a whole adults have been collected from May to August. In the mountains of Hokkaido females of this species do fly; in this area they lay eggs on upright, woody plant stems. On Ellesmere Island the females typically lay their eggs in a mass on or in their cocoon, although they sometimes lay their eggs on the ground or on vegetation around the cocoon. Females can produce fertile eggs without mating (parthenogenesis). Vladimir Dubatolov was able to rear a female from eastern Yakutia, and subsequently from northwestern Chukotka, without a male present from its emergence from its cocoon, and both times the moths laid eggs which hatched into viable caterpillars. Despite the large distance between these two localities, on Ellesmere Island in Canada Morewood did not observe the same.

The caterpillars may take many years to metamorphose, seven to eleven years. In the Suntar-Khayata Range a cocoon was recovered on the end of a branch of a shrub of Pinus pumila. In northwestern Chukotka Autonomous Okrug the caterpillars begin making their cocoons in August. The caterpillars can be exposed to subzero temperatures, in which they freeze solid, but when brought back indoors, many start moving around again as soon as they thaw. John Ross, when after being trapped in the ice of northern Canada for a number of years during his expedition seeking the Northwest Passage, kept and fed a number in the ship hold. These were repeatedly frozen and thawed through the winter; after four such cycles two survived to pupate, and of those one cocoon was full of flies whilst the other developed into a fully formed adult moth.

=== Species interactions ===
The caterpillars feed on Saxifraga tricuspidata, S. oppositifolia, Salix arctica, Dryas and possibly also Potentilla. It has also been found on Rubus acaulis, and caterpillars have been raised in laboratory settings on raspberry, Rubus idaeus, leaves. In Russia the caterpillars were successfully raised on a diet of Rosa, Rubus and Taraxacum in the laboratory. On Somerset Island their main food plants were recorded to be Saxifraga tricuspidata and S. oppositifolia.

Ross observed many of the caterpillars parasitised by a species of ichneumonid wasp and a type of fly in the Canadian archipelago. Up to six flies can inhabit one caterpillar. The flies emerge from the cocoons or hibernaculae in the spring. These animals are parasitoids. The flies Ross saw were likely the tachinid fly Chetogena gelida, which appears to be host specific to Gynaephora rossii. On Ellesmere Island, where this moth was found to be sympatric with the closely related G. groenlandica, Chetogena gelida only attacked G. rossii, whereas the new species Exorista thula was only hosted by G. groenlandica.

Despite living in areas free of bats, they still show avoidance responses to their sounds. In the High Arctic these moths are preyed upon by birds. The eggs are also eaten by small foraging birds; on Ellesmere Island such birds may tear open the cocoons to feed on the egg mass usually laid inside.

== Uses ==
This species is numbered as 8290 in the List of moths of North America (the MONA or Hodges number).

== Conservation ==
In 1832 it was recorded as common on the beach of Fury Bay of Somerset Island, Nunavut, with about a hundred specimens of caterpillars and moths collected on 16 June. In Hokkaido it would appear rarer, with only two specimens collected between the 1920s to the 1950s.

It has been recorded as present in the following protected areas:

- Baxter State Park, Maine, USA
- Cameron River Crossing Territorial Park, Northwest Territory, Canada
- Caribou Mountains Wildland Park, Alberta, Canada
- Kenai National Wildlife Refuge, Alaska, USA
- Rocky Mountain National Park, Colorado, USA
- Sirmilik National Park, Nunavut, Canada
