= Grigory Grum-Grshimailo =

Russian zoologist

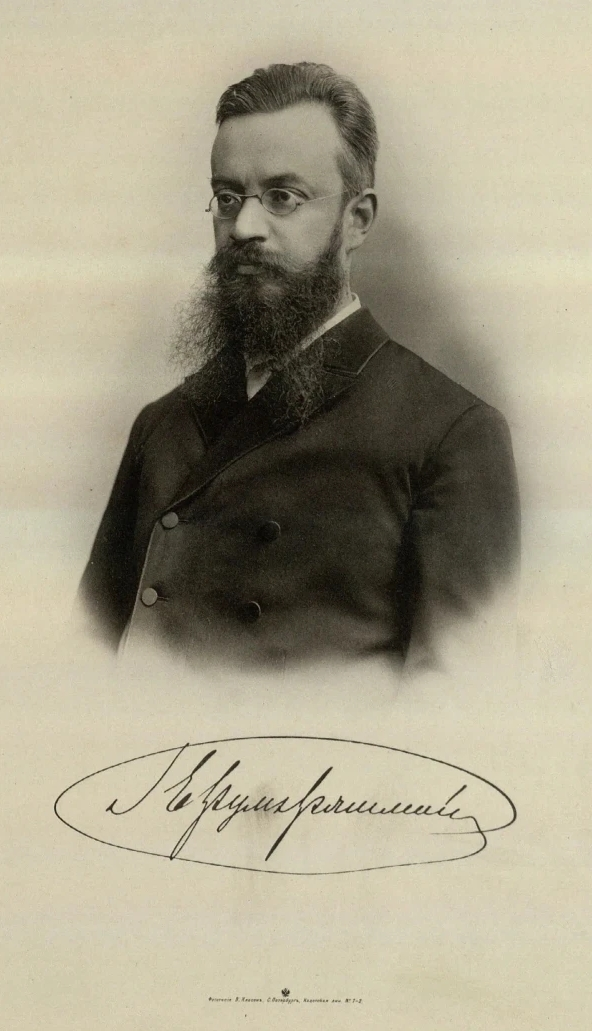
Grigory Grum-Grshimailo

Grigory Yefimovich Grum-Grzhimailo (Russian: Григо́рий Ефи́мович Грумм-Гржима́йло, romanized: Grigory Yefimovich Grumm-Grzhimaylo, 1860–1936) was a Russian zoologist best known for his expeditions to Central Asia (Pamir, Bukhara, Tianshan, Gansu, and Kukunor), western Mongolia and Tuva, and the Russian Far East.

== Life and work ==
Born in St. Petersburg, his early interest was in the phylloxera problem in the vineyards of N. Y. Danilevsky. He wrote his first scientific work at the age of 21 on some Lepidoptera of the Crimea (1882, vol. 8 of the Proceedings of the Russian Entomological Society).

He was associated with Professor M. N. Bogdanov at the St. Petersburg Museum and contributed many of his own collections to it. He also studied the collections of the museum that had been made by Nikolai Przhevalsky, Grigory Potanin, Pyotr Semyonov-Tyan-Shansky, and other explorers of Central Asia.

From 1882, Grum-Grshimailo studied Lepidoptera from the Bessarabia, Podolia Governorate, Crimea, and the Baltic and got interested in zoogeography. While collecting near Sarepta, he met the German collector Rückbeil. He also met the Grand Duke Nicholas Mikhailovich Romanov who suggested that he should publish his work. He also promised his support for an expedition to the Pamirs. In 1884, he started his first Pamir expedition on which he visited the Alai Mountains, ascending the Trans-Alai range via Pass Tersagarsky to reach the upper Muksu River to reach Fedchenko's glacier. He visited Lake Karakul and returned. He collected 12,000 specimens, thirty of which were new to science. Spurred by the interest to his work, he made a second expedition in 1885 visiting Karateghin, Darvaz, Bukhara Khanate, Ghissar, Kulyab, Beldzhuan, Shakhrisiabz, Karshi, Guzara, Shirabad, Kabadian, and Kurgan-Tyube. This time he collected 20,000 specimens of insects.

His third expedition was in 1886 along the Kara-Darya, via Pass Kugart, then up along the Naryn valley to the Narynsky Fortress (now the town of Naryn), and from there to the south toward At-Bashi and further to the southwest along the broad valley of At-Bashi River, by the At-Bashi Mt. Range, along the Great Silk Route to Tash Rabat and Chatyr-Köl. They went until Kashgar and then via Pass Irkeshtam and back to Osh.

Expeditions conducted with his younger brother Lieutenant M. E. Grum-Grshimailo between 1889 and 1890 were intended to bring back specimens of Przewalski's horse. After capturing two wild horses in the vicinity of Gushen (44° N 90°30' E), and no longer afraid that shooting would frighten the animals away they managed to collect 1,048 bird specimens. They traveled 8,600 km.

He made several more expeditions in the succeeding years but he later lost much of the early interest in entomology owing in part to a conflict with the sponsor of his expeditions. A term was that the materials he collected were to go to Grand Duke Nicholas Mikhaylovich Romanov, but he needed a private collection. He was accused of embezzling material and financial difficulties made him sell part of his collection to Henry John Elwes.

He was awarded the Constantine Medal in 1907 by the Imperial Russian Geographical Society.

== Publications ==
Partial list

- Novae species et varietas Rhopalocerum Horae Societatis Entomologicae Rossicae, 22: 303-307 (1888)
- Le Pamir et la faune lépidoptérologique. Mém. lépidop. Ed. N. M. Romanoff 4 volumes 576 p., 21 pl. (1890)
- Lepidoptera nova in Asia centrali novissime lecta et descripta Horae Societatis Entomologicae Rossicae. 25 (3-4): 445-465 (1891)
- Lepidoptera nova vei parum cognita regionis palaearcticae. I. Ezhegod. Zool Mus. Imp. Akad. Nauk, Ann. Mus. Zool. Acad. Imp. Sc. Volume 4 (1899) (in Russian).
- Lepidoptera nova vel parum cognita regionis palaearcticae. II. Ezhegod. Zool. Mus. Imp. Acad. Nauk, Ann Mus. Zool. Acad. Imp. Sc., Volume 7 (1902) (in Russian)

== Collections ==
Many of Grum-Grshimailo's specimens of Lepidoptera and Coleoptera are in the Zoological Museum in St. Petersburg. Other specimens were sold to H.J. Elwes.
