= List of lymantriid genera: N =

The large moth subfamily Lymantriinae contains the following genera beginning with N:

- Naroma
- Neoliparina
- Neomardara
- Neorgyia
- Noliproctis
- Nolosia
- Nudariphleps
- Numenes
- Numenoides
- Nygmia
