= List of lymantriid genera: V =

The large moth subfamily Lymantriinae includes the following genera beginning with the letter V:

- Varatra
- Varmina
- Viridichira
- Viridichirana
- Vohitra
- Volana
