= List of lymantriid genera: G =

The large moth subfamily Lymantriinae contains the following genera beginning with G:

- Gallienica
- Gissarus
- Grammoa
- Griveaudyria
- Gynaephora
