= Belinda (disambiguation) =

Belinda is a common female first name.

Belinda may also refer to:

== Film and television ==
- Belinda (film), a 1988 Australian film
- Belinda (telenovela), a 2004 Mexican series featuring Adriana Cataño

== Literature ==
- Belinda (Allen book), a 1992 children's book by Pamela Allen
- Belinda (Rice novel), a novel by Anne Rice writing as Anne Rampling
- Belinda (Edgeworth novel), a novel by Maria Edgeworth
- Belinda (Broughton novel), a novel by Rhoda Broughton
- Belinda (play), a play by A. A. Milne
- Belinda (comic strip) or Belinda Blue-Eyes, a UK comic strip by Steve Dowling
- Belinda, a comics series by Guido Crepax
- Belinda, a character in Alexander Pope's 1712 poem The Rape of the Lock

== Music ==
- Belinda Peregrín, Spanish-Mexican actress and singer
  - Belinda (Belinda Peregrín album), her debut album
- Belinda (Belinda Carlisle album)
- "Belinda" (song), by Eurythmics, 1981
- "Belinda", a 1971 song by Bobbie Gentry from Patchwork

== Places ==
- Belinda (moon), a moon of Uranus named after the heroine of The Rape of the Lock
- Belinda, Virginia, US, an unincorporated community
- Mount Belinda, a stratovolcano on Montagu Island in the South Sandwich Islands

== Other uses ==
- Belinda, a genus of tussock moths
- Belinda (ship), a brig wrecked in 1824 in Western Australia
- Belinda (cigarette), a Dutch brand
- Stan Belinda (born 1966), American former Major League Baseball player
