= Griveaudyria mascarena =

Scientific classification
- Domain: Eukaryota
- Kingdom: Animalia
- Phylum: Arthropoda
- Class: Insecta
- Order: Lepidoptera
- Superfamily: Noctuoidea
- Family: Erebidae
- Subfamily: Lymantriinae
- Tribe: Orgyiini
- Genus: Griveaudyria
- Species: G. mascarena

Binomial name
- Griveaudyria mascarena (Butler, 1878)

Synonyms
- Dasychira mascarena Butler, 1878; Orgyia mascarena (Butler, 1878); Lemuriana mascarena (Butler, 1878)

Species of moth

Griveaudyria mascarena is a tussock moth from Madagascar, first described by Arthur Gardiner Butler in 1878.
