= V. indica =

V. indica may refer to:

- Vanessa indica, the Indian red admiral or in the United States, the Asian admiral, a butterfly species
- Varmina indica, a species of moth
- Vateria indica, a plant species endemic to India
- Viverricula indica, the small Indian civet, a mammal species found across south and South-East Asia

== Subspecies ==
- Vachellia nilotica subsp. indica, the prickly acacia, a perennial tree

== Synonyms ==
- Valsaria indica, a synonym for Valsaria insitiva, a plant pathogen species that causes perennial canker
- Velella indica, a synonym for Velella velella, the purple sail, a free-floating hydrozoan

== See also ==
- Indica (disambiguation)
