= Eudasychira ampliata =

Scientific classification
- Kingdom: Animalia
- Phylum: Arthropoda
- Class: Insecta
- Order: Lepidoptera
- Superfamily: Noctuoidea
- Family: Erebidae
- Subfamily: Lymantriinae
- Tribe: Orgyiini
- Genus: Eudasychira
- Species: E. ampliata

Binomial name
- Eudasychira ampliata (Butler, 1878)

Synonyms
- Dasychira ampliata Butler, 1878; Vietteria ampliata (Butler, 1878)

Species of moth

Eudasychira ampliata is a tussock moth from Madagascar, first described by Arthur Gardiner Butler in 1878, and formerly placed in its own genus, Vietteria.
