= Caenina =

Caenina may refer to:

- Aroa, a moth genus in the family Erebidae
- Pantana, a moth genus in the family Erebidae
- Caenina (town), a town nearby ancient Rome
