= Casama vilis =

Scientific classification
- Kingdom: Animalia
- Phylum: Arthropoda
- Class: Insecta
- Order: Lepidoptera
- Superfamily: Noctuoidea
- Family: Erebidae
- Genus: Casama
- Species: C. vilis

Binomial name
- Casama vilis (Walker, 1865)

Synonyms
- Euproctis vilis Walker, 1865; Laelia richteri Daniel, 1960; Casama indeterminata Walker, 1865

Species of moth

Casama vilis is a moth of the family Erebidae first described by Francis Walker in 1865. It is found in Sri Lanka, India, Middle East, Ethiopia, Kenya and Somalia.

The caterpillar is known to feed on Acacia catechu and Prosopis cineraria.
