= Psalis =

Scientific classification
- Kingdom: Animalia
- Phylum: Arthropoda
- Clade: Pancrustacea
- Class: Insecta
- Order: Lepidoptera
- Superfamily: Noctuoidea
- Family: Erebidae
- Tribe: Orgyiini
- Genus: Psalis; Hübner, 1823

Synonyms
- Arestha Walker, 1855; Anchyneura Felder, 1861

Genus of moths

Psalis is a genus of tussock moths in the family Erebidae. The genus was described by Jacob Hübner in 1823.

== Species ==
The following species are included in the genus.

- Psalis africana Kiriakoff, 1956
- Psalis antica Walker, 1855
- Psalis approximata Walker, 1865
- Psalis costalis Matsumura, 1911
- Psalis falcata Walker, 1865
- Psalis kanshireiensis Wileman, & South 1917
- Psalis pennatula Fabricius, 1793
- Psalis praeusta Felder, 1874
- Psalis punctuligera Mabille, 1880
- Psalis securis Hübner, 1823
- Psalis tacta Walker, 1865
