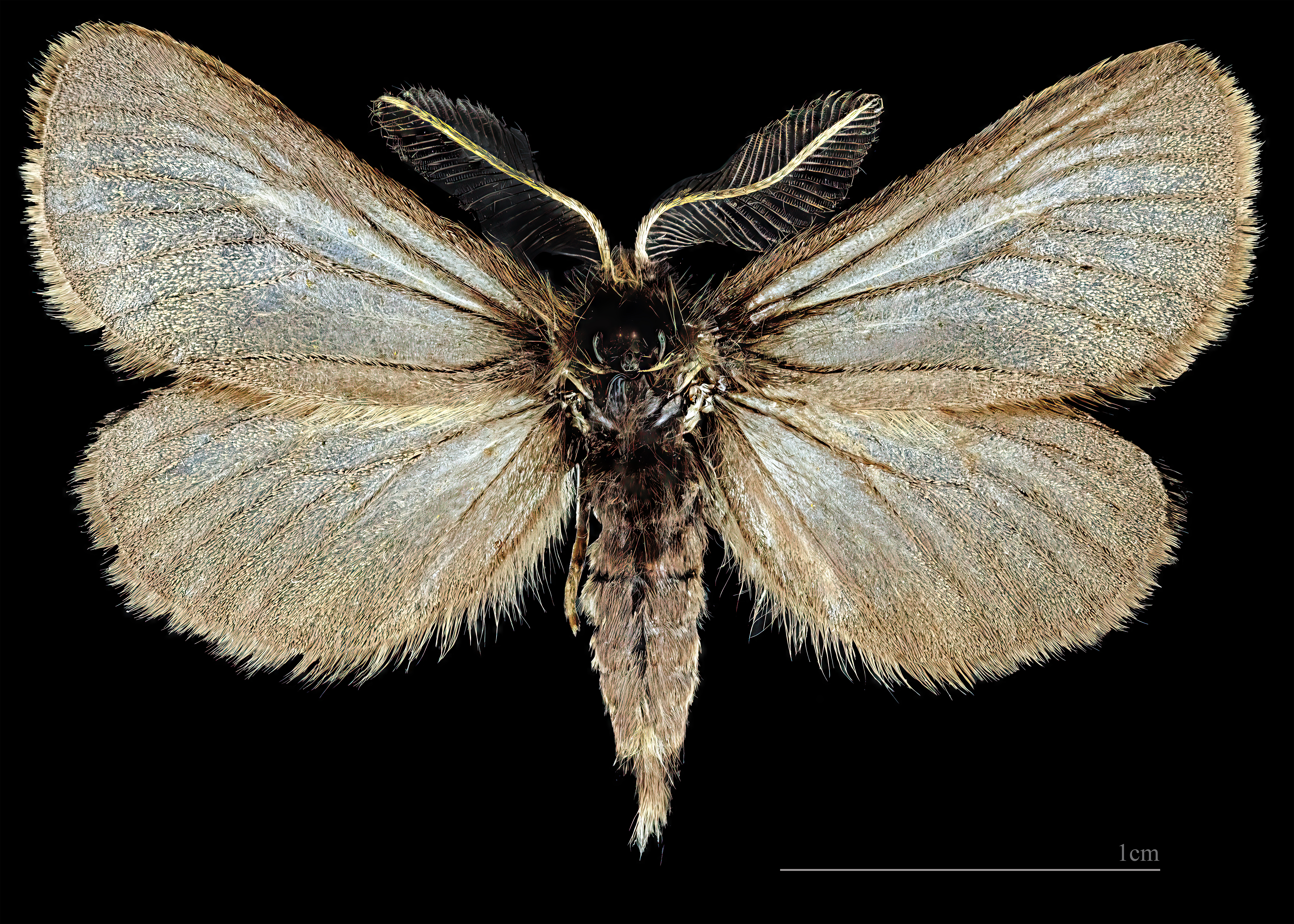
- Male Penthophera morio

Scientific classification
- Domain: Eukaryota
- Kingdom: Animalia
- Phylum: Arthropoda
- Class: Insecta
- Order: Lepidoptera
- Superfamily: Noctuoidea
- Family: Erebidae
- Tribe: Orgyiini
- Genus: Penthophera; Germar, 1812

Synonyms
- Hipogymna; Hypogymna; Liparis

= Penthophera =

Genus of moths

Penthophera is a genus of tussock moths in the family Erebidae. The genus was erected by Ernst Friedrich Germar in 1812.

The Global Lepidoptera Names Index and Lepidoptera and Some Other Life Forms only include Penthophera morio as a species in this genus.

== Species ==
The genus contains the following four species:

- Penthophera caucasica
- Penthophera lutea
- Penthophera morio
- Penthophera subfusca
