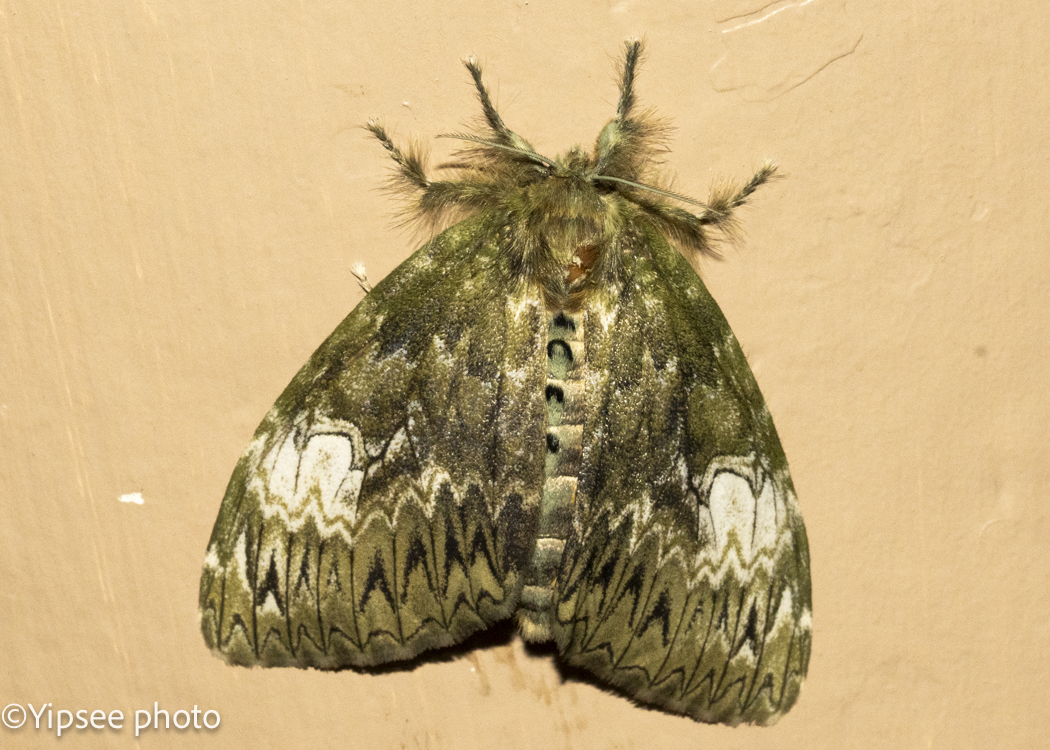

Scientific classification
- Domain: Eukaryota
- Kingdom: Animalia
- Phylum: Arthropoda
- Class: Insecta
- Order: Lepidoptera
- Superfamily: Noctuoidea
- Family: Erebidae
- Genus: Ilema
- Species: I. virescens

Binomial name
- Ilema virescens (Moore, 1879)

Synonyms
- Cadrusia virescens Moore, 1879

= Ilema virescens =

Species of moth

Ilema virescens is a species of moth in the family Erebidae that was first described by Frederic Moore in 1879. It is found in India.
