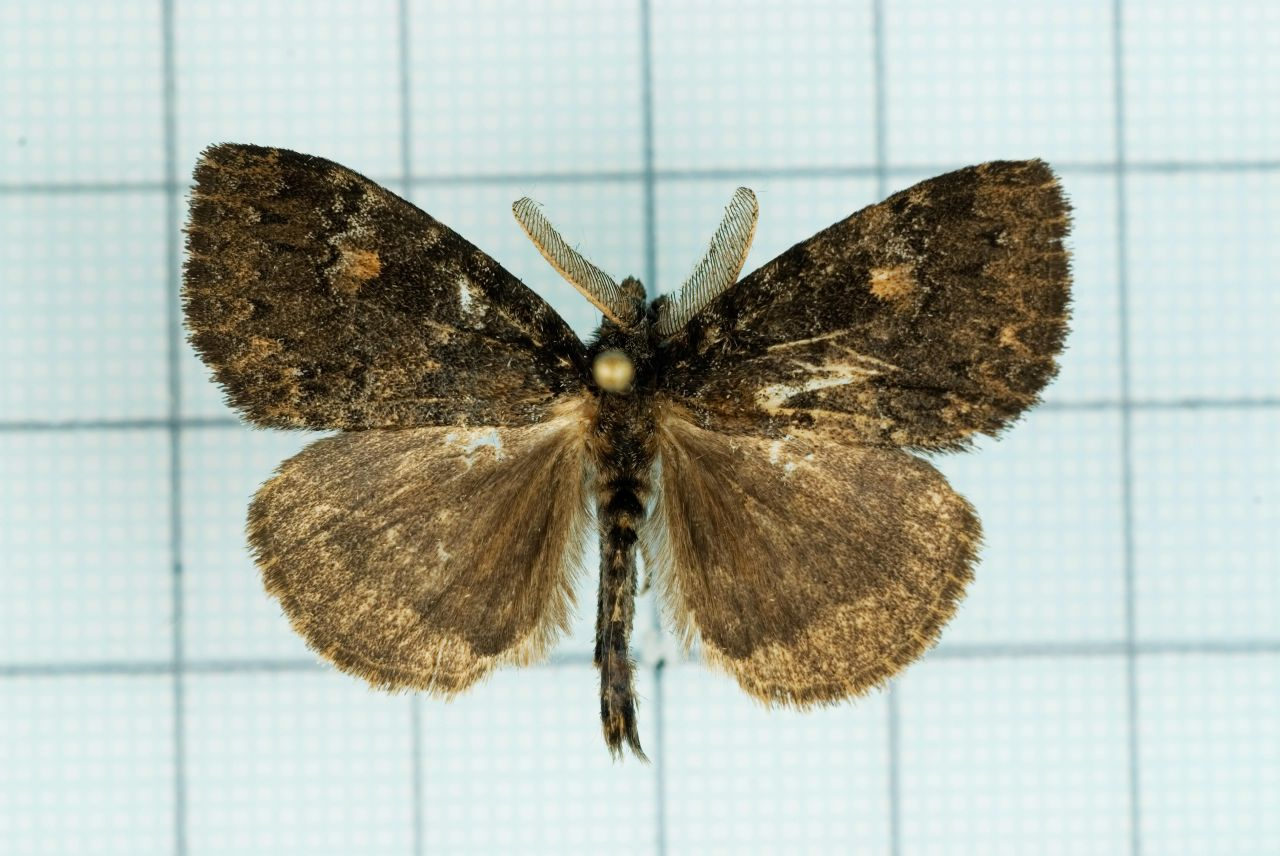

Scientific classification
- Kingdom: Animalia
- Phylum: Arthropoda
- Class: Insecta
- Order: Lepidoptera
- Superfamily: Noctuoidea
- Family: Erebidae
- Genus: Ilema
- Species: I. kosemponica

Binomial name
- Ilema kosemponica (Strand, 1914)

Synonyms
- Dasychira kosemponica Strand, 1914; Neocifuna kosemponica

= Ilema kosemponica =

Species of moth

Ilema kosemponica is a moth in the family Erebidae first described by Embrik Strand in 1914. It is found in Taiwan.

The wingspan is 29–37 mm.
