= Psalis pennatula =

Scientific classification
- Kingdom: Animalia
- Phylum: Arthropoda
- Clade: Pancrustacea
- Class: Insecta
- Order: Lepidoptera
- Superfamily: Noctuoidea
- Family: Erebidae
- Genus: Psalis
- Species: P. pennatula

Binomial name
- Psalis pennatula (Fabricius, 1793)

Synonyms
- Bombyx pennatula Fabricius, 1793; Psalis securis Hübner, 1823; Arestha antica Walker, 1855; Anchyneura praeusta Felder, 1861; Rigema falcata Walker, 1865; Rigema tacta Walker, 1865; Anticyra approximata Walker, 1865; ?Arestha praeusta Felder, 1874; Laelia costalis Matsumura, 1911; Orgyia securis Swinhoe, 1923; Orgyia praeusta Swinhoe, 1923; Dasychira pennatula Collenette, 1932

Species of moth

Psalis pennatula, the yellow hairy caterpillar, is a moth of the family Erebidae. The species was first described by Johan Christian Fabricius in 1793. It is found in India, Sri Lanka, Thailand, Australia and Java.

== Description ==
Its wingspan is about 40 mm. The forewings are coloured in two shades of brown divided by a line from the base to the wingtip. The anterior part is pale brown, whereas the posterior part is darker brown. Hindwings off white. Eggs are yellow and pubescent. The caterpillar is hairy with a broad black line along the back. There are four brown tussocks. Black line is bordered by yellow patches on each segment and each yellow patch having a red line through it. Two red glands found on the back of the two abdominal segments. There are two black hair-pencils found on the prothorax.

== Biology ==
The caterpillar is known to feed on many agriculturally important crops such as Oryza sativa, Sorghum bicolor, Saccharum officinarum, Imperata cylindrica, Camellia sinensis, Persea bombycina, Shorea robusta, Vigna mungo, Solanum melongena, Tectona grandis, Triticum aestivum, Cucumis sativus, Eleusine coracana, Hyparrhenia, Cyperus and Pennisetum purpureum.

It is a minor pest on paddy, where the attack by caterpillar can result defoliation. Damage can be minimized by using light traps or using chlorpyrifos. A braconid parasitoid wasp Microplitis pennatula is known to induces rapid behavioral changes in the parasitized host, which is the caterpillar of P. pennatula.
