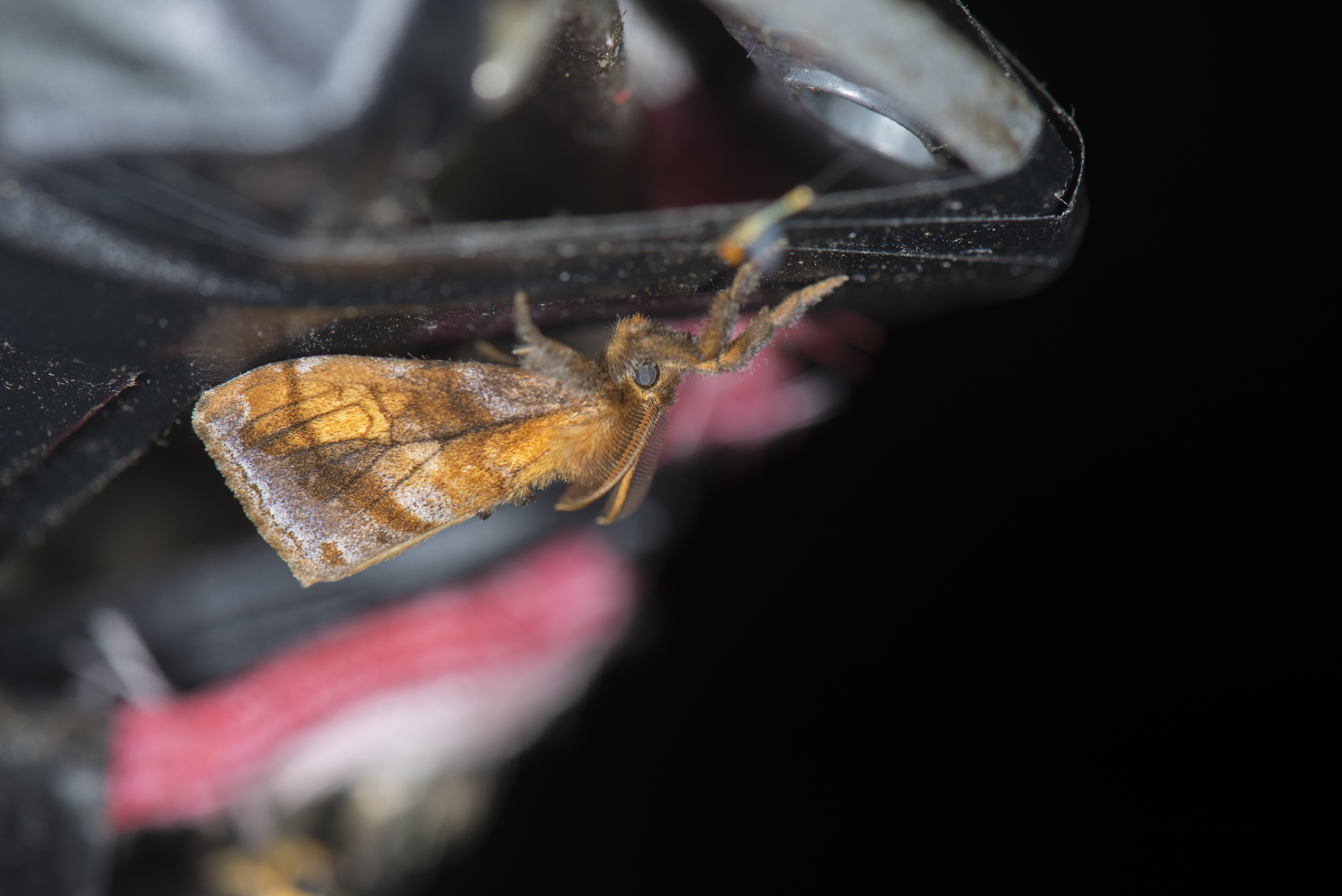

Scientific classification
- Kingdom: Animalia
- Phylum: Arthropoda
- Class: Insecta
- Order: Lepidoptera
- Superfamily: Noctuoidea
- Family: Erebidae
- Tribe: Orgyiini
- Genus: Cifuna; Walker, 1855

= Cifuna =

Genus of moths

Cifuna is a genus of tussock moths in the family Erebidae. The genus was erected by Francis Walker in 1855.

== Species ==
- Cifuna glauca Chao, 1987
- Cifuna glaucozona (Collenette, 1934)
- Cifuna infuscata Chao, 1987
- Cifuna locuples Walker, 1855
