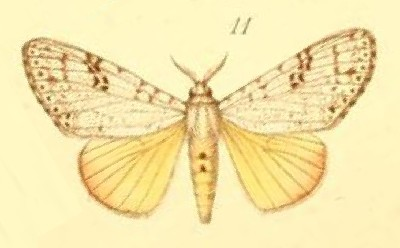
- Eudasychira quinquepunctata

Scientific classification
- Domain: Eukaryota
- Kingdom: Animalia
- Phylum: Arthropoda
- Class: Insecta
- Order: Lepidoptera
- Superfamily: Noctuoidea
- Family: Erebidae
- Tribe: Orgyiini
- Genus: Eudasychira; Möschler, 1887

Synonyms
- Vietteria Griveaud, 1976

= Eudasychira =

Genus of moths

Eudasychira is a genus of tussock moths in the family Erebidae.

== Species ==
- Eudasychira abellii Dall'Asta, 1983
- Eudasychira amata (Hering, 1926)
- Eudasychira ampliata (Butler, 1878)
- Eudasychira anisozyga (Collenette, 1960)
- Eudasychira audeoudi (Collenette, 1939)
- Eudasychira aurantiaca (Kenrick, 1914)
- Eudasychira aureotincta (Kenrick, 1914)
- Eudasychira bokuma (Collenette, 1961)
- Eudasychira calliprepes (Collenette, 1933)
- Eudasychira demoulini Dall'Asta, 1983
- Eudasychira diaereta (Collenette, 1959)
- Eudasychira dina (Hering, 1926)
- Eudasychira enigmatica Dall'Asta, 1983
- Eudasychira errata Dall'Asta, 1983
- Eudasychira eudela (Collenette, 1954)
- Eudasychira gainsfordi Dall'Asta, 2009
- Eudasychira galactina (Mabille, 1880)
- Eudasychira geoffreyi (Bethune-Baker, 1913)
- Eudasychira georgiana (Fawcett, 1901)
- Eudasychira isozyga (Collenette, 1960)
- Eudasychira leucopsaroma (Collenette, 1959)
- Eudasychira macnultyi (Collenette, 1957)
- Eudasychira metathermes (Hampson, 1905)
- Eudasychira nadinae Dall'Asta, 1983
- Eudasychira poliotis (Hampson, 1910)
- Eudasychira proleprota (Hampson, 1905)
- Eudasychira quinquepunctata Möschler, 1887
- Eudasychira sciodes (Collenette, 1961)
- Eudasychira shabana Dall'Asta, 1983
- Eudasychira subeudela Dall'Asta, 1983
- Eudasychira sublutescens (Holland, 1893)
- Eudasychira subpolia Dall'Asta, 1983
- Eudasychira thomensis (Talbot, 1929)
- Eudasychira tshuapana Dall'Asta, 1983
- Eudasychira ultima Dall'Asta, 1983
- Eudasychira umbrensis (Bethune-Baker, 1913)
- Eudasychira unicolora Dall'Asta, 1983
- Eudasychira vuattouxi Dall'Asta, 1983
