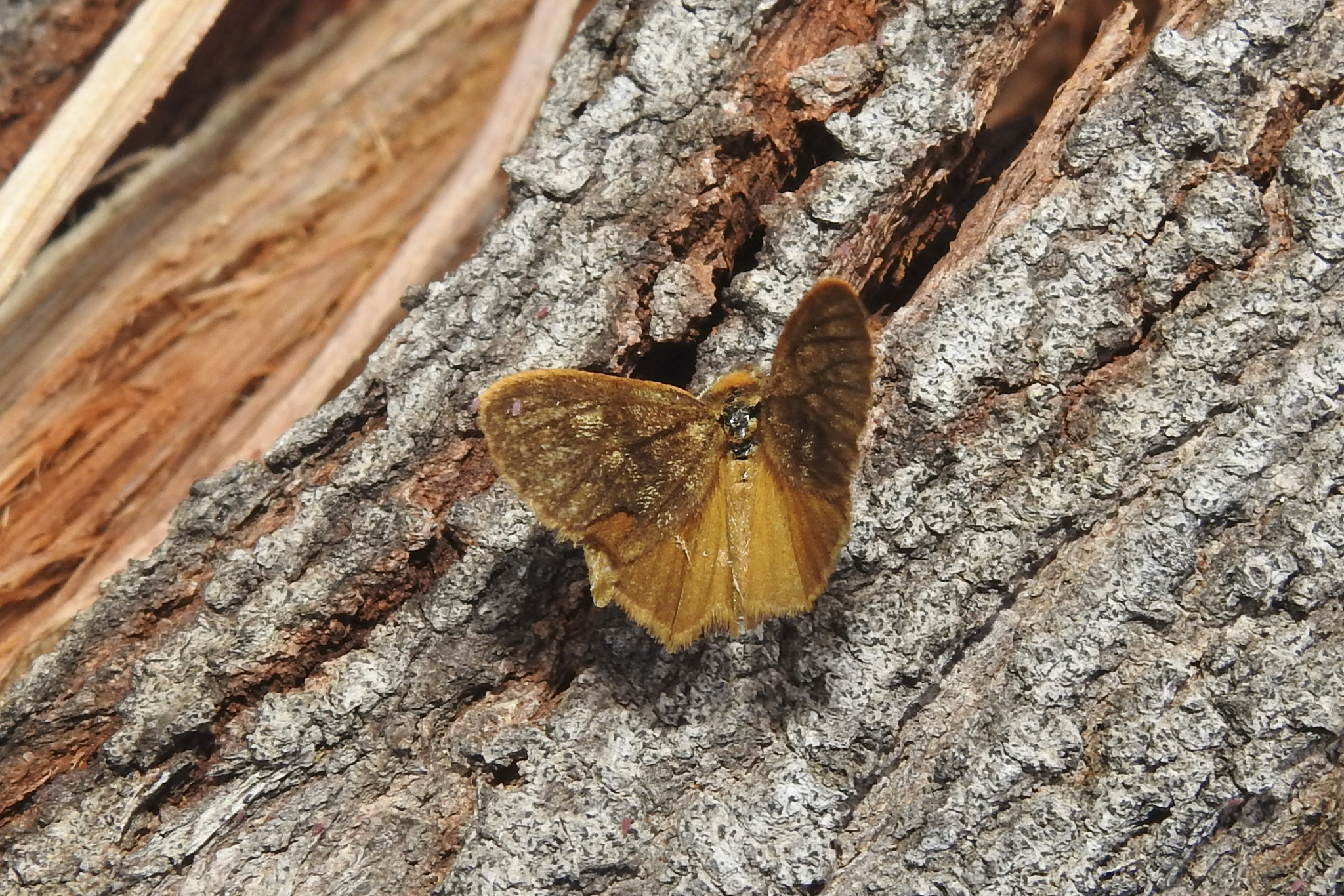
- Habrophylla euryzona

Scientific classification
- Kingdom: Animalia
- Phylum: Arthropoda
- Clade: Pancrustacea
- Class: Insecta
- Order: Lepidoptera
- Superfamily: Noctuoidea
- Family: Erebidae
- Tribe: Orgyiini
- Genus: Habrophylla; Turner, 1921

= Habrophylla =

Genus of moths

Habrophylla is a genus of tussock moths in the family Erebidae. The genus was described by Alfred Jefferis Turner in 1921. All the species are found in Australia.

== Species ==
- Habrophylla euryzona (Lower, 1902) Queensland
- Habrophylla pycnadelpha (Lower, 1903) South Australia
- Habrophylla retinopepla (Lower, 1905) Queensland
