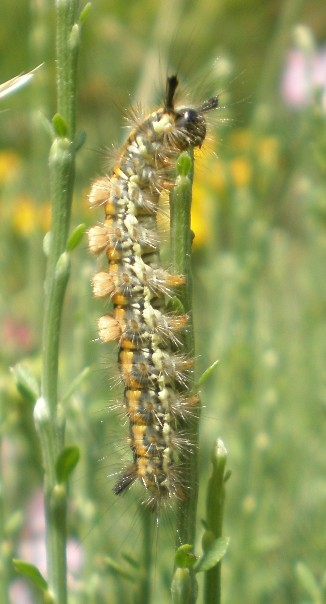

Scientific classification
- Domain: Eukaryota
- Kingdom: Animalia
- Phylum: Arthropoda
- Class: Insecta
- Order: Lepidoptera
- Superfamily: Noctuoidea
- Family: Erebidae
- Genus: Clethrogyna
- Species: C. aurolimbata

Binomial name
- Clethrogyna aurolimbata (Guenée, 1835)

Synonyms
- Orgya [sic] aurolimbata Guenée, 1835; Orgyia aurolimbata Guenée, 1835; Notolophus aurolimbata (Guenée, 1835); Orgyia aurolimbata var. guadarramensis Staudinger, 1871; Orgyia ochrolimbata Staudinger, 1881; Orgyia christophi Alphéraky, 1897; Orgyia aurolimbata catalonica Leraut & Leraut, 2006

= Clethrogyna aurolimbata =

Species of moth

Clethrogyna aurolimbata is a species of moth of the family Erebidae first described by Achille Guenée in 1835. It is found in the Pyrenees and on the Iberian Peninsula. The larvae feed on Genista species, including Genista purgans. This species has commonly been placed in the genus Orgyia but molecular analyses support the genus Clethrogyna as a separate lineage.
