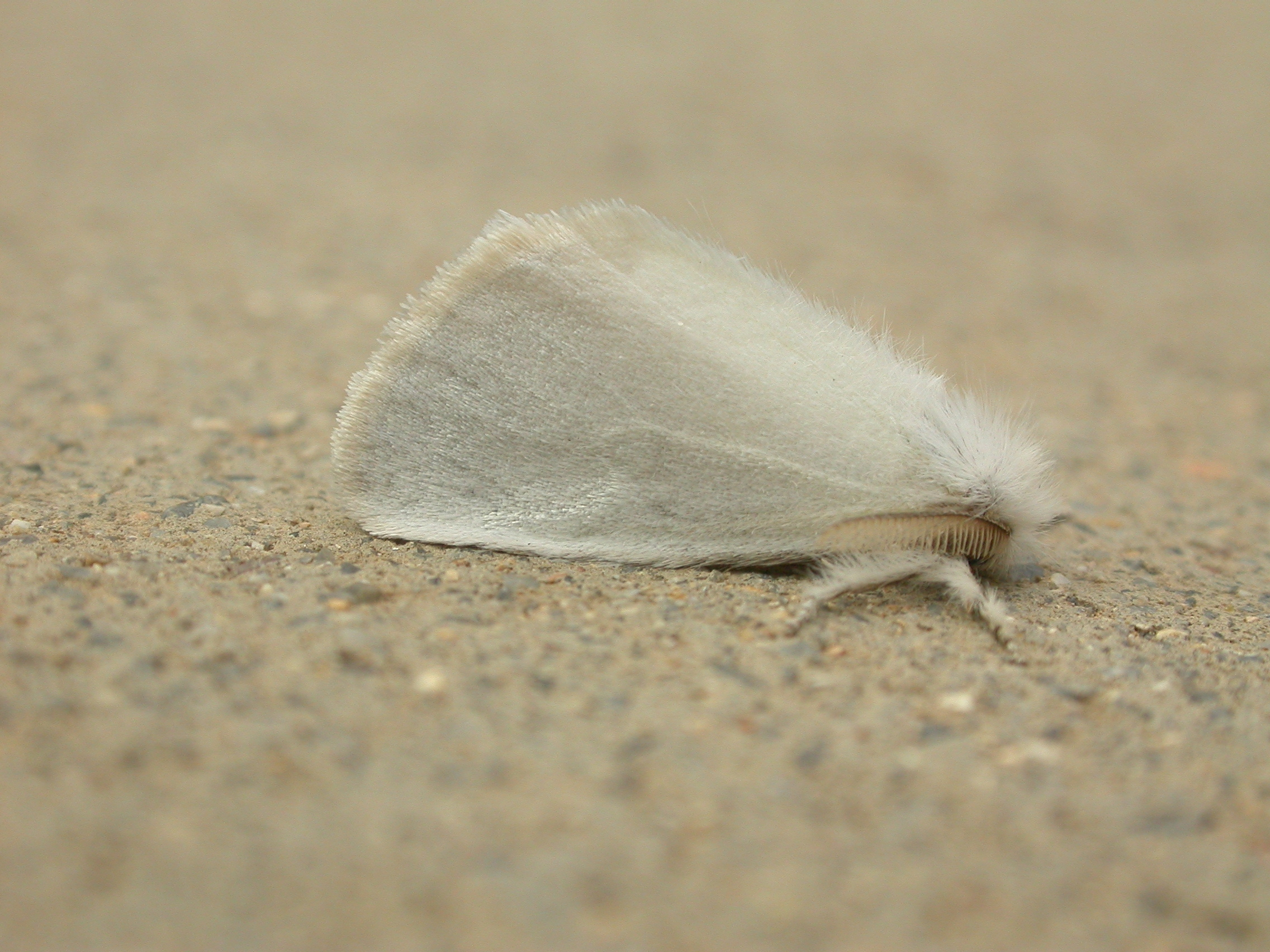
- Acyphas semiochrea

Scientific classification
- Kingdom: Animalia
- Phylum: Arthropoda
- Clade: Pancrustacea
- Class: Insecta
- Order: Lepidoptera
- Superfamily: Noctuoidea
- Family: Erebidae
- Tribe: Orgyiini
- Genus: Acyphas; Hübner, 1819

= Acyphas (moth) =

Genus of moths

Acyphas is a genus of tussock moths in the family Erebidae erected by Jacob Hübner in 1819.

== Species ==
- Acyphas amphideta Turner, 1902
- Acyphas chionitis Turner, 1902
- Acyphas fulviceps Walker, 1855
- Acyphas leptotypa Turner, 1904
- Acyphas leucomelas Walker, 1855
- Acyphas pelodes Lower, 1893
- Acyphas semiochrea (Herrich-Schäffer, [1855])
