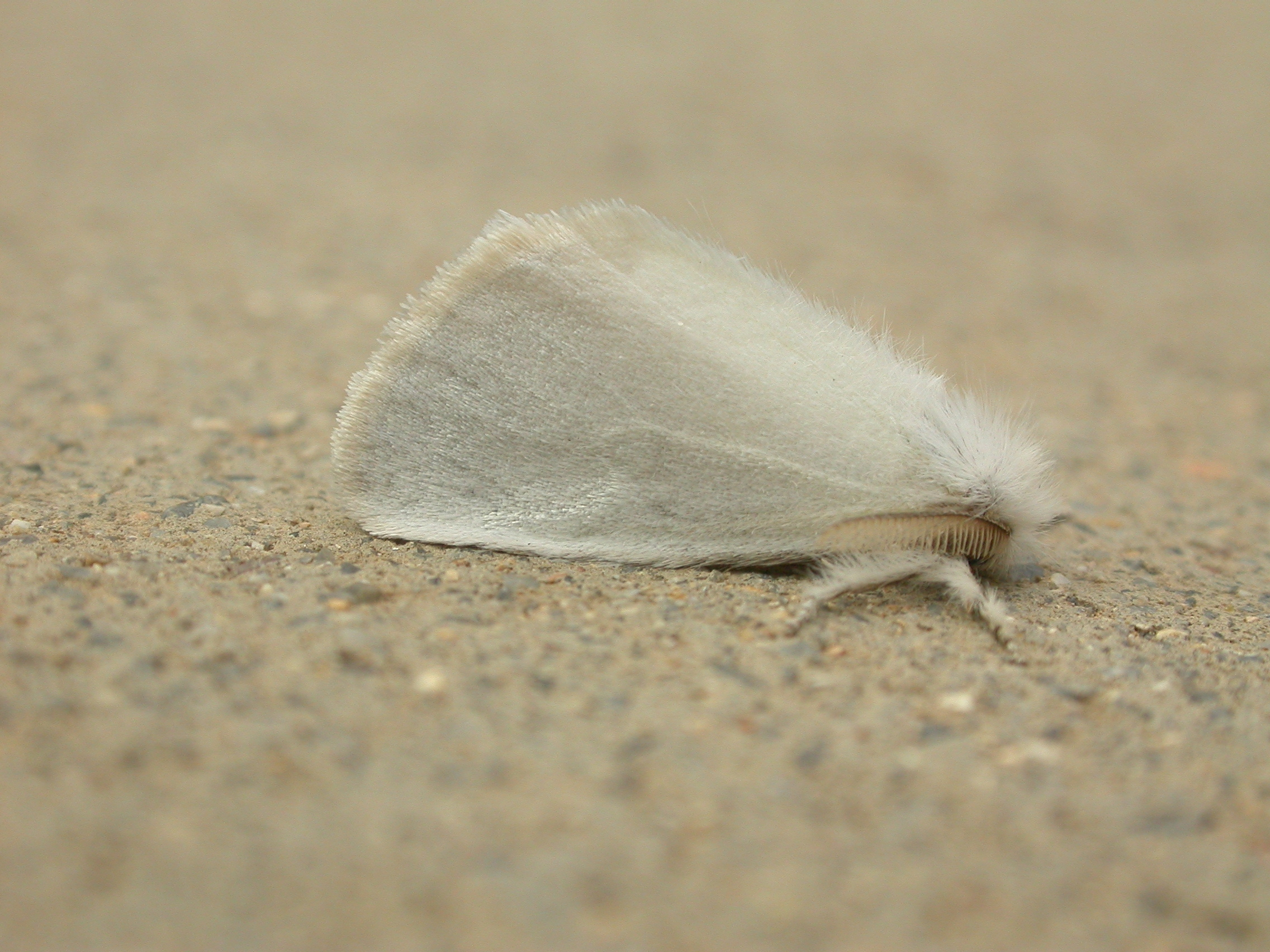

Scientific classification
- Domain: Eukaryota
- Kingdom: Animalia
- Phylum: Arthropoda
- Class: Insecta
- Order: Lepidoptera
- Superfamily: Noctuoidea
- Family: Erebidae
- Genus: Acyphas
- Species: A. semiochrea

Binomial name
- Acyphas semiochrea (Herrich-Schäffer, 1855)

Synonyms
- Porthesia semiochrea Herrich-Schäffer, 1855; Euproctis leucomelas Walker & Westwood, 1855; Orgyia diemenii Herrich-Schäffer, 1858; Porthesia anacausta Meyrick, 1891; Porthesia hololeuca Meyrick, 1891; Leucoma alboanalis Strand, 1914

= Acyphas semiochrea =

Species of moth

Acyphas semiochrea, the omnivorous tussock moth, is a moth of the subfamily Lymantriinae first described by Gottlieb August Wilhelm Herrich-Schäffer in 1855. It is found along most of the coast of Australia, including: New South Wales, Queensland, South Australia, Tasmania, Victoria and Western Australia.

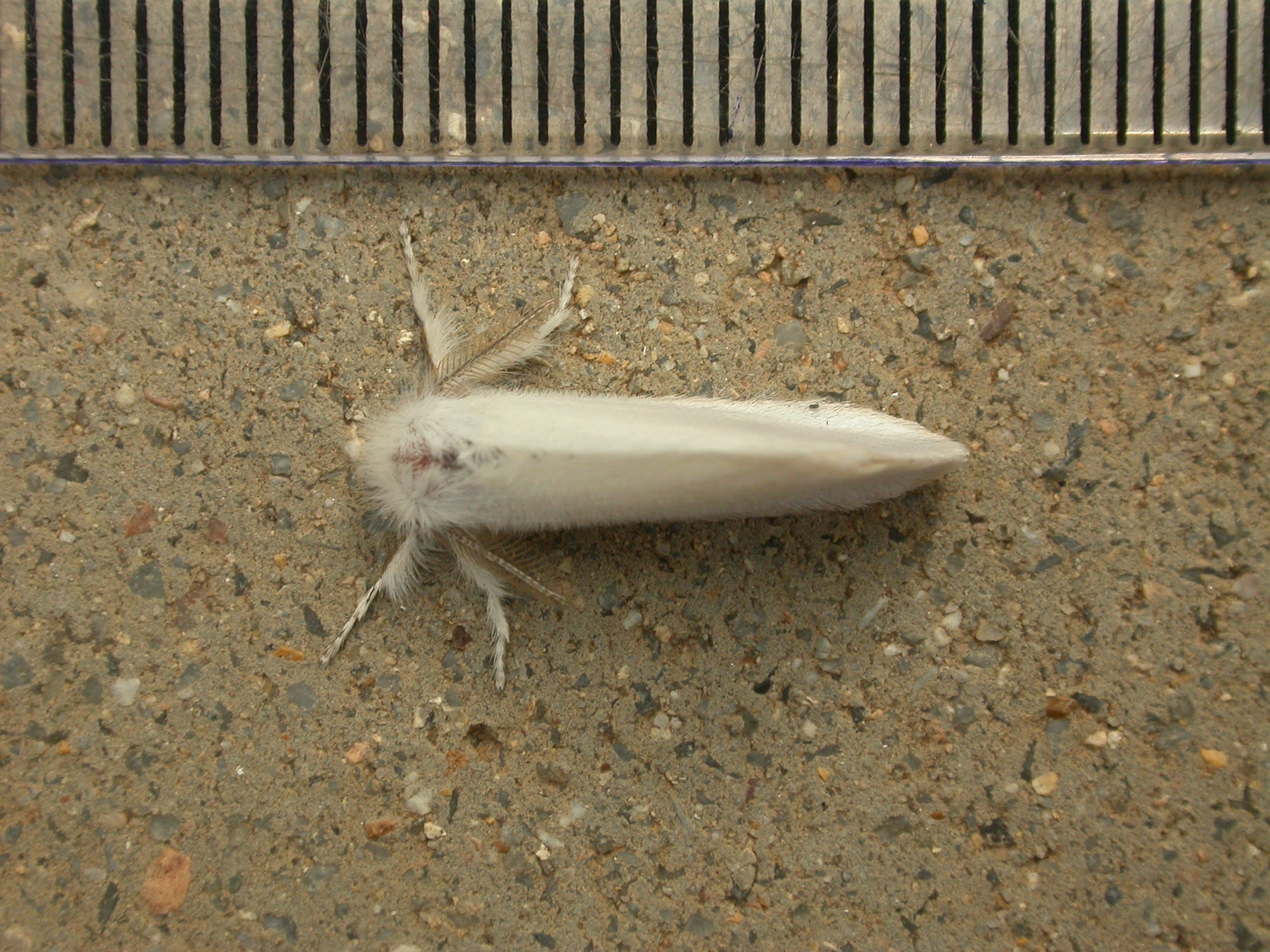

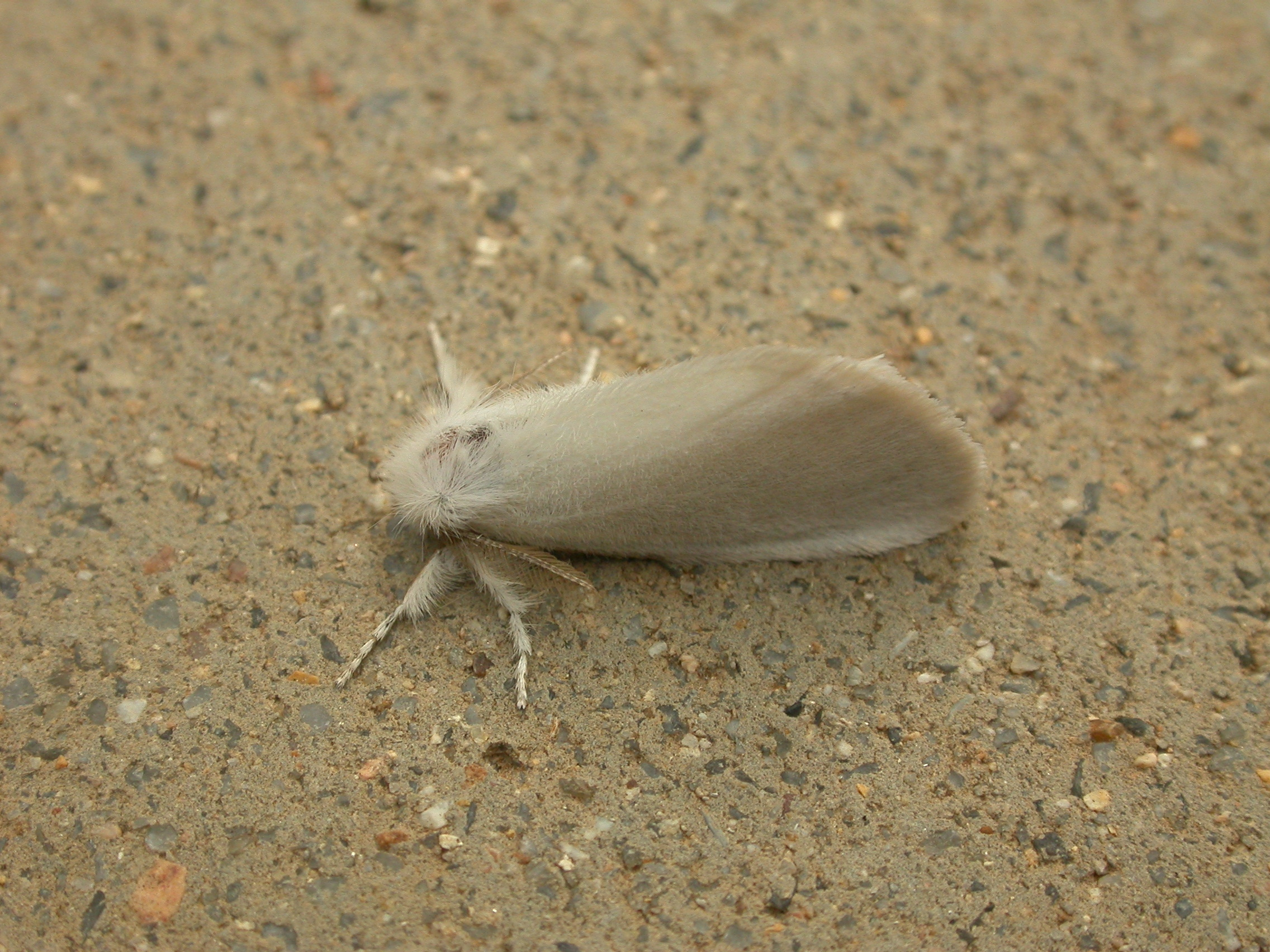

The wingspan is about 30 mm.

It is considered a pest on Pinus radiata, but has also been recorded feeding on Acacia, Eucalyptus, Pultenaea, Dodonaea, Choretrum, Myoporum and Tamarix.
