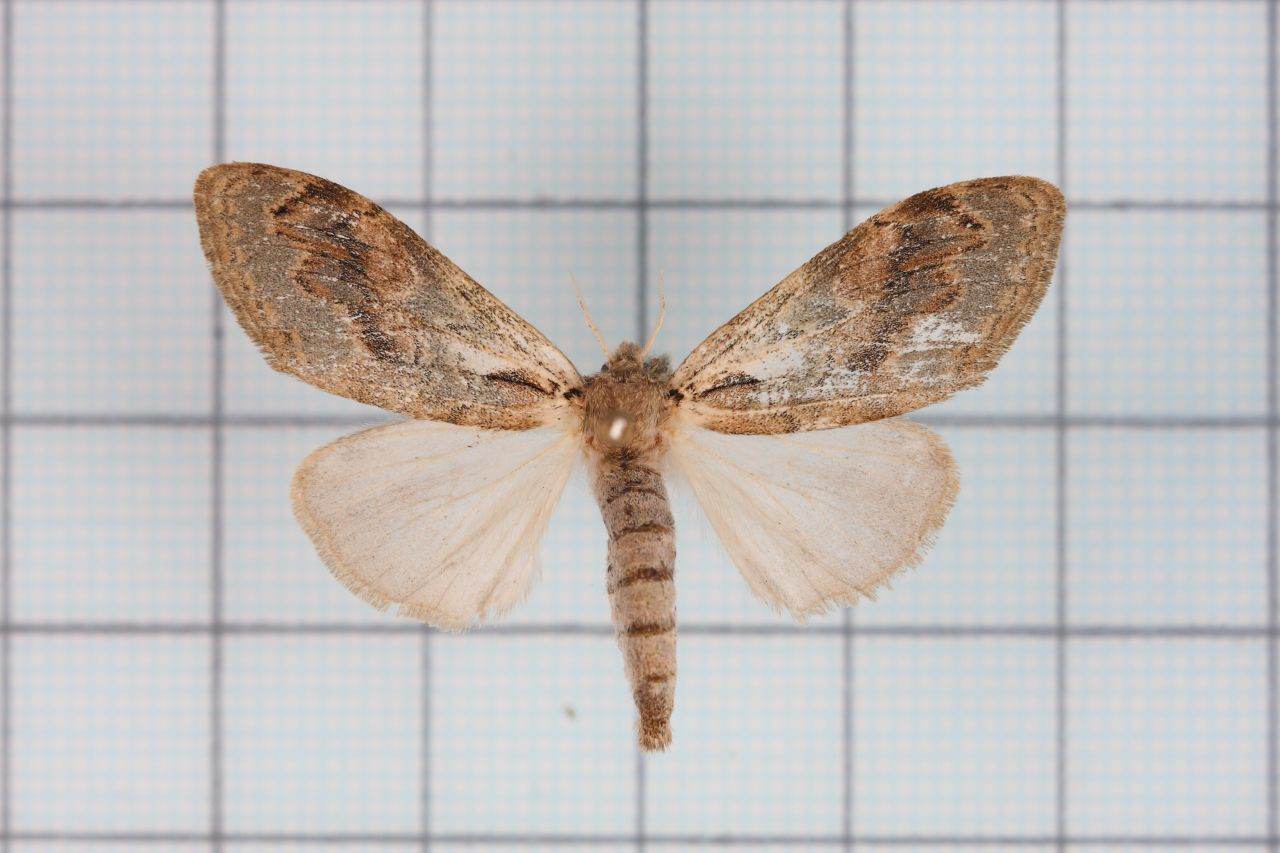
- Female
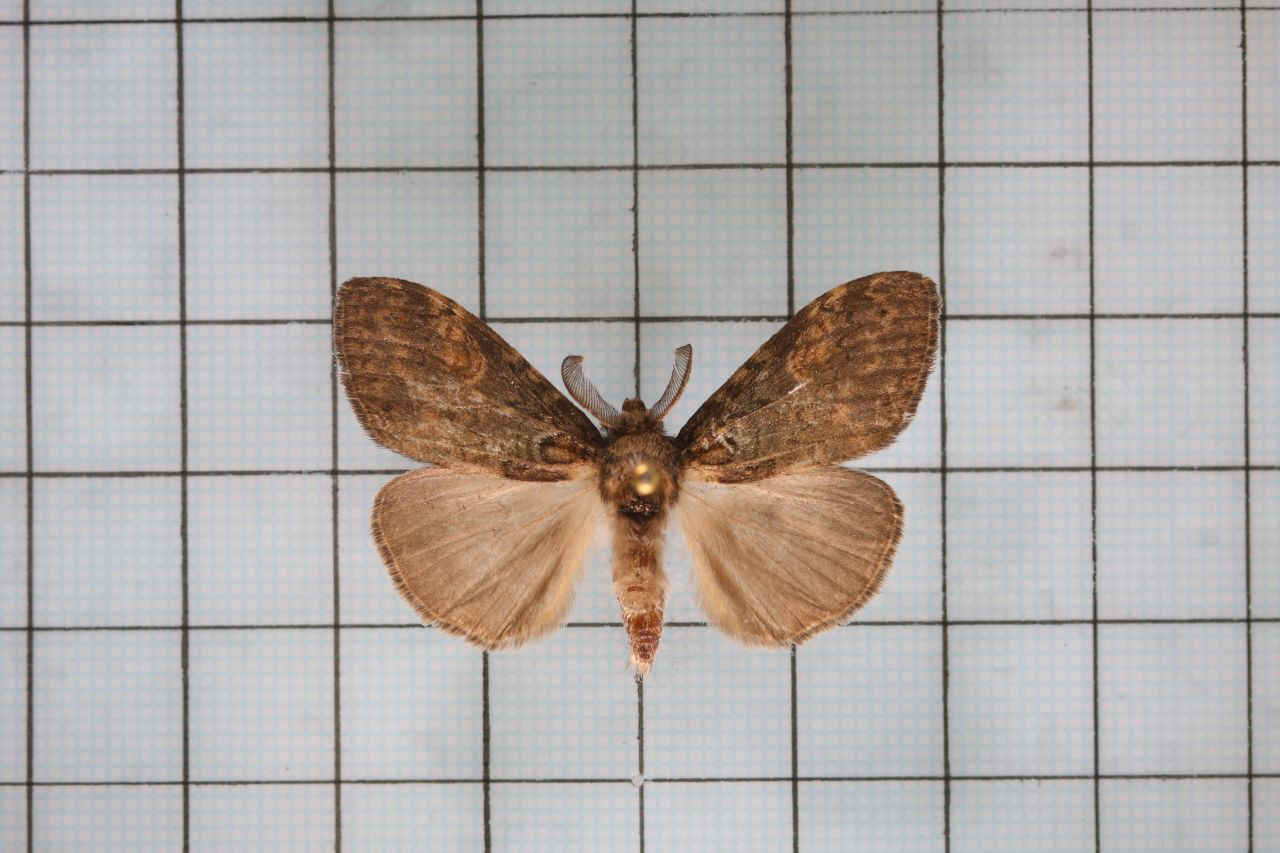
- Male

Scientific classification
- Kingdom: Animalia
- Phylum: Arthropoda
- Class: Insecta
- Order: Lepidoptera
- Superfamily: Noctuoidea
- Family: Erebidae
- Genus: Olene
- Species: O. dudgeoni

Binomial name
- Olene dudgeoni (C. Swinhoe, 1907)

Synonyms
- Dasychira dudgeoni C. Swinhoe, 1907; Pseudodura dasychiroides Strand, 1914

= Olene dudgeoni =

Species of moth

Olene dudgeoni is a moth of the subfamily Lymantriinae first described by Charles Swinhoe in 1907. It is found from the north-eastern Himalayas to Indochina, Taiwan and Sundaland.

The wingspan is 30–38 mm. Adults are on wing in January, April and May.

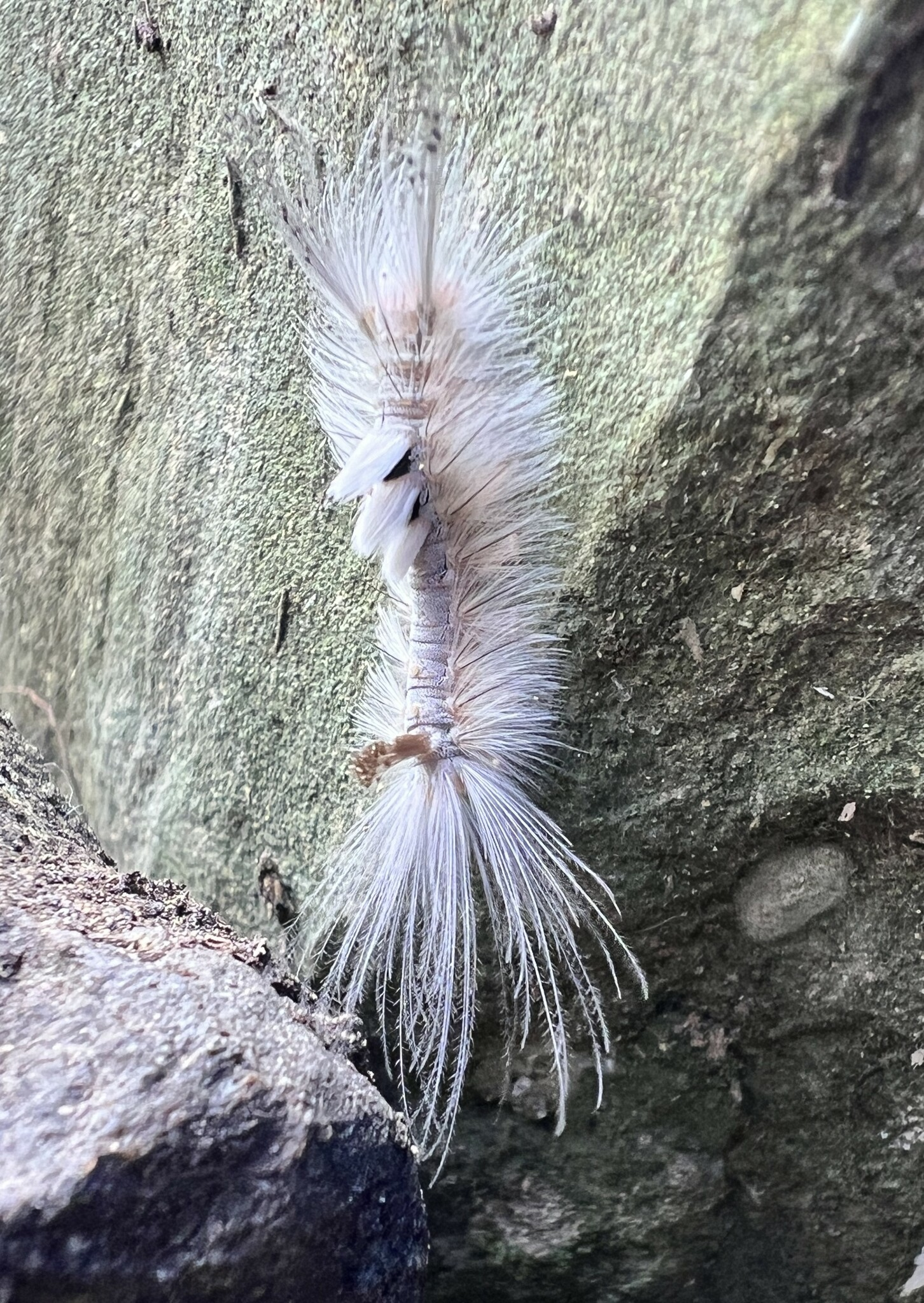
larva (vivo)

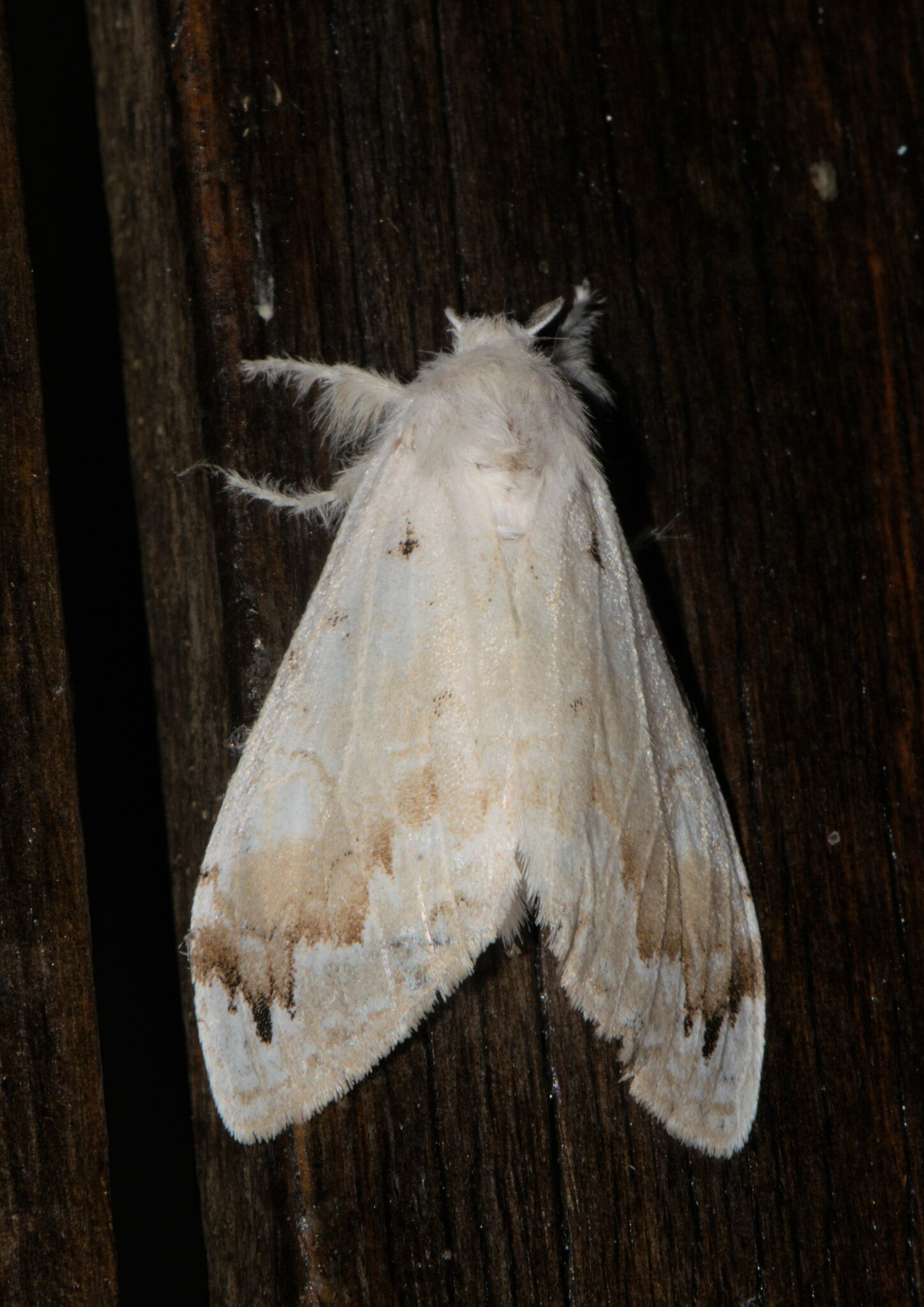
imago (vivo)
