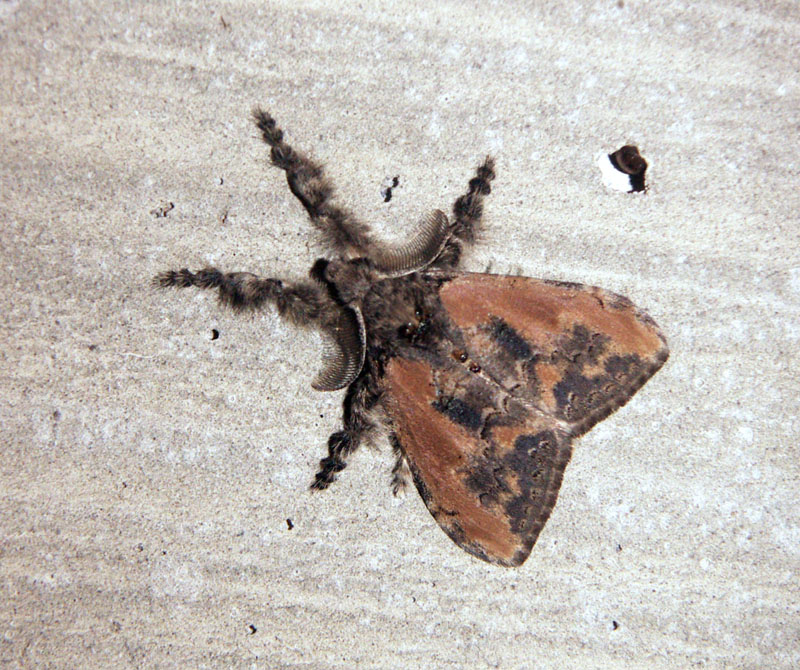

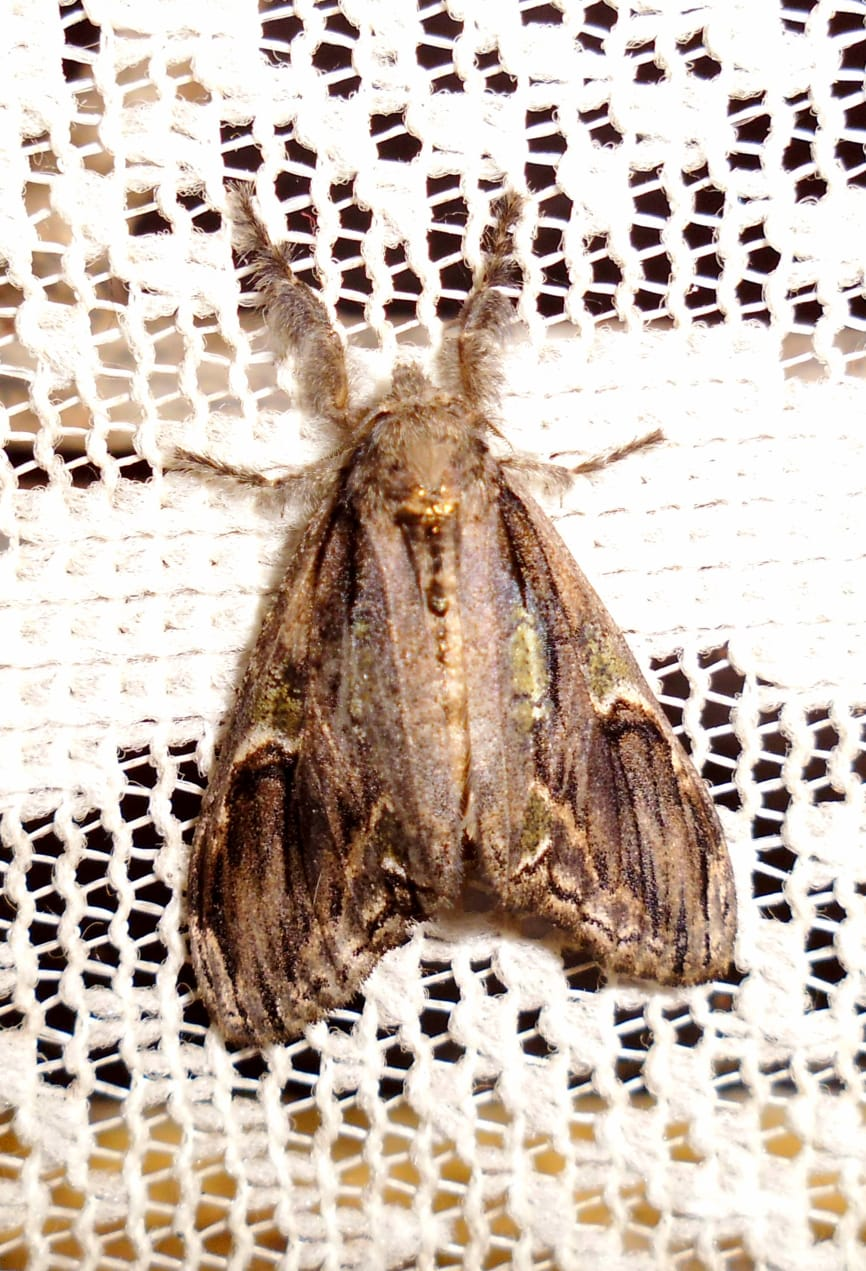

Scientific classification
- Kingdom: Animalia
- Phylum: Arthropoda
- Class: Insecta
- Order: Lepidoptera
- Superfamily: Noctuoidea
- Family: Erebidae
- Genus: Olene
- Species: O. mendosa

Binomial name
- Olene mendosa Hübner, 1823

Synonyms
- Antipha basalis Walker, 1855; Nioda fusiformis Walker, 1855; Rilia lanceolata Walker, 1855; Dasychira mendosa (Hübner, 1823); Dasychira sawanta Moore, [1860]; Dasychira basalis Walker, 1865; Dasychira basigera Walker, 1865; Dasychira divisa Walker, 1865; Rilias distinguenda Walker, 1865; ?Olene basivitta Walker, 1865; Rilia basivitta Walker, 1869; Turriga invasa Walker, 1869

= Olene mendosa =

Species of moth

Olene mendosa, the brown tussock moth or hairy tussock moth, is a species of moth in the family Erebidae. The species was first described by Jacob Hübner in 1823. It is found in India, Bangladesh, Sri Lanka, Indonesia, Taiwan, Thailand and Australia.

== Description ==
Sexes show dimorphism with variable colour morphs. The wingspan of the female is about 46–54 mm, whereas the male's is about 30–40 mm. The adult male has two morphs. The common form is smoke brown with uniformly brown forewings and pale greyish hindwings. In the forewing, black specks and a pale patch outside the subbasal line can be seen.

The adult female also has two forms with an areole on each forewing and they lack the white colored portions on forewings which is found on male. The common form has an irregular longitudinal dark brown zone in the center of forewing. The more rare form has pale colours. The underside of the wings are similar in both sexes with less pronounced markings.

The full-grown caterpillar is 38–44 mm long. It is hairy with four white or brown dorsal tussocks. It is greyish brown with a crimson-reddish head, legs and prolegs. Head with red stripes found on full-grown caterpillar. Pupation occurs inside a silk cocoon spun between the leaves of the food plant.

== Pest ==
The caterpillar of this species is polyphagous and feeds on a diverse range of plant species. In India, the caterpillar has been recorded on crops such as Solanum tuberosum, Tamarindus indica, Citrus, Cedrus deodara, Acacia nilotica, Mangifera indica, Camellia sinensis, Ricinus communis, and Salmalia malabarica. In Bangladesh, caterpillars were recorded on Sesbania aculeata and Bauhinia purpurea.

Other common food plants of larva include, Ceiba, Durio, Terminalia, Raphanus, Shorea, Dipterocarpus, Aleurites, Excoecaria, Pelargonium, Saccharum, Sorghum, Zea, Cinnamomum, Careya, Arachis, Butea, Cajanus, Cassia, Dalbergia, Pithecellobium, Sesbania, Vigna, Lagerstroemia, Hibiscus, Zizyphus, Rosa, Populus, Santalum, Dimocarpus, Litchi, Nephelium, Schleichera, Achras, Palaquium, Melongena, Tectona, Macadamia integrifolia, Persea americana, Terminalia carolinensis.
