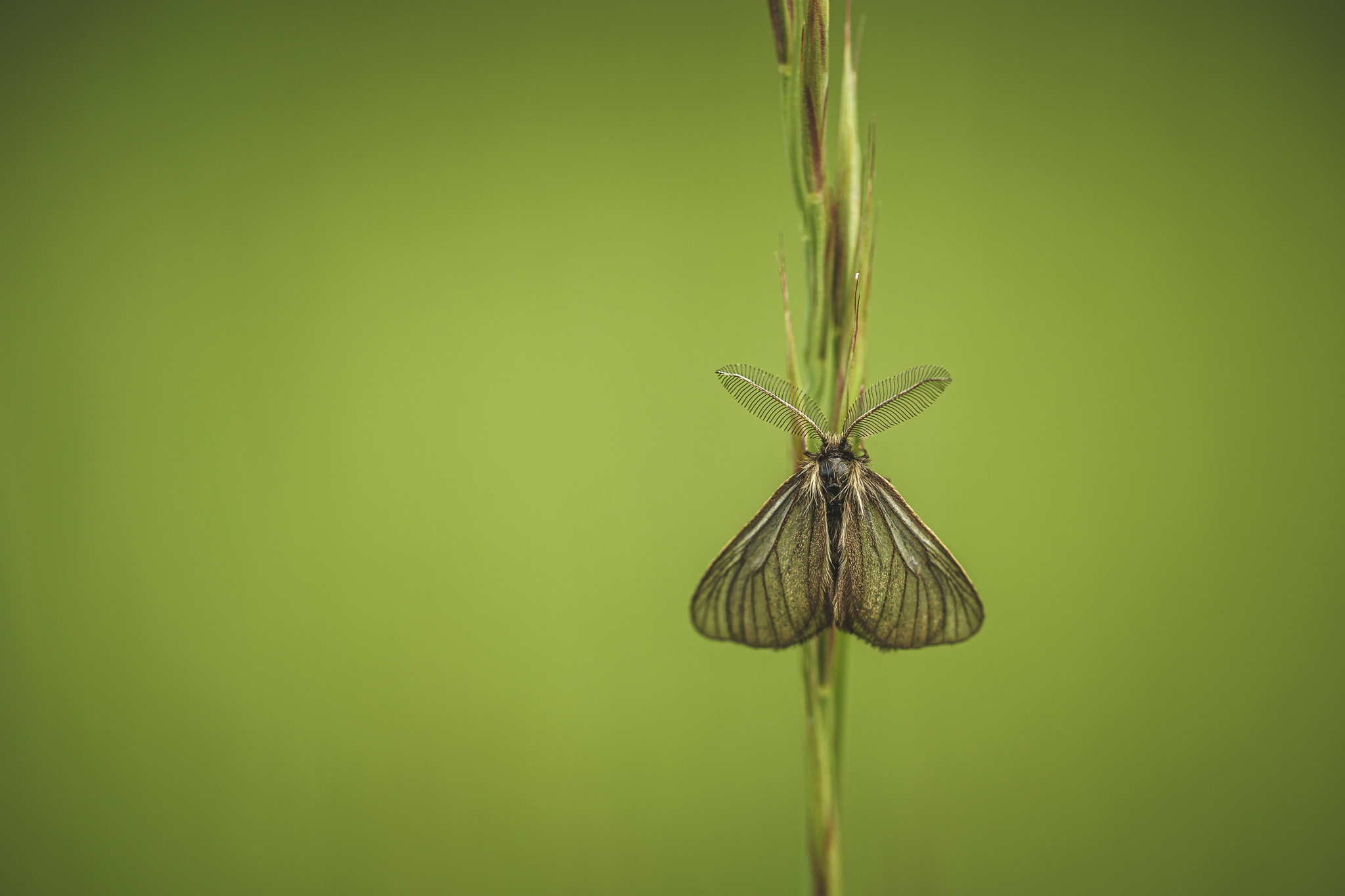
- Male

Scientific classification
- Kingdom: Animalia
- Phylum: Arthropoda
- Class: Insecta
- Order: Lepidoptera
- Superfamily: Noctuoidea
- Family: Erebidae
- Genus: Penthophera
- Species: P. morio

Binomial name
- Penthophera morio Linnaeus, 1767

Synonyms
- Hypogymna morio

= Penthophera morio =

Species of moth

Penthophera morio is a moth species of subfamily Lymantriinae first described by Carl Linnaeus in 1767.

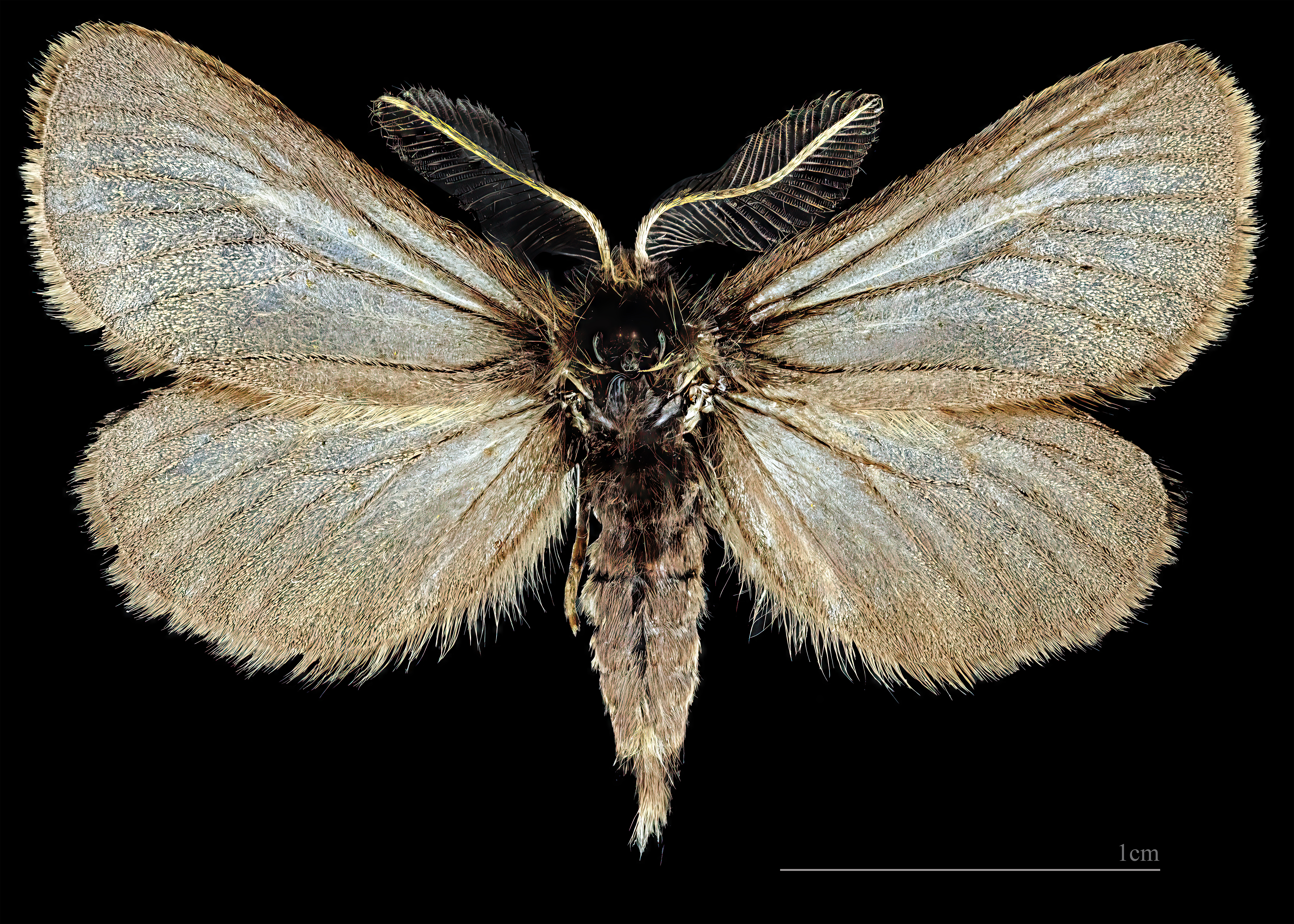
♂

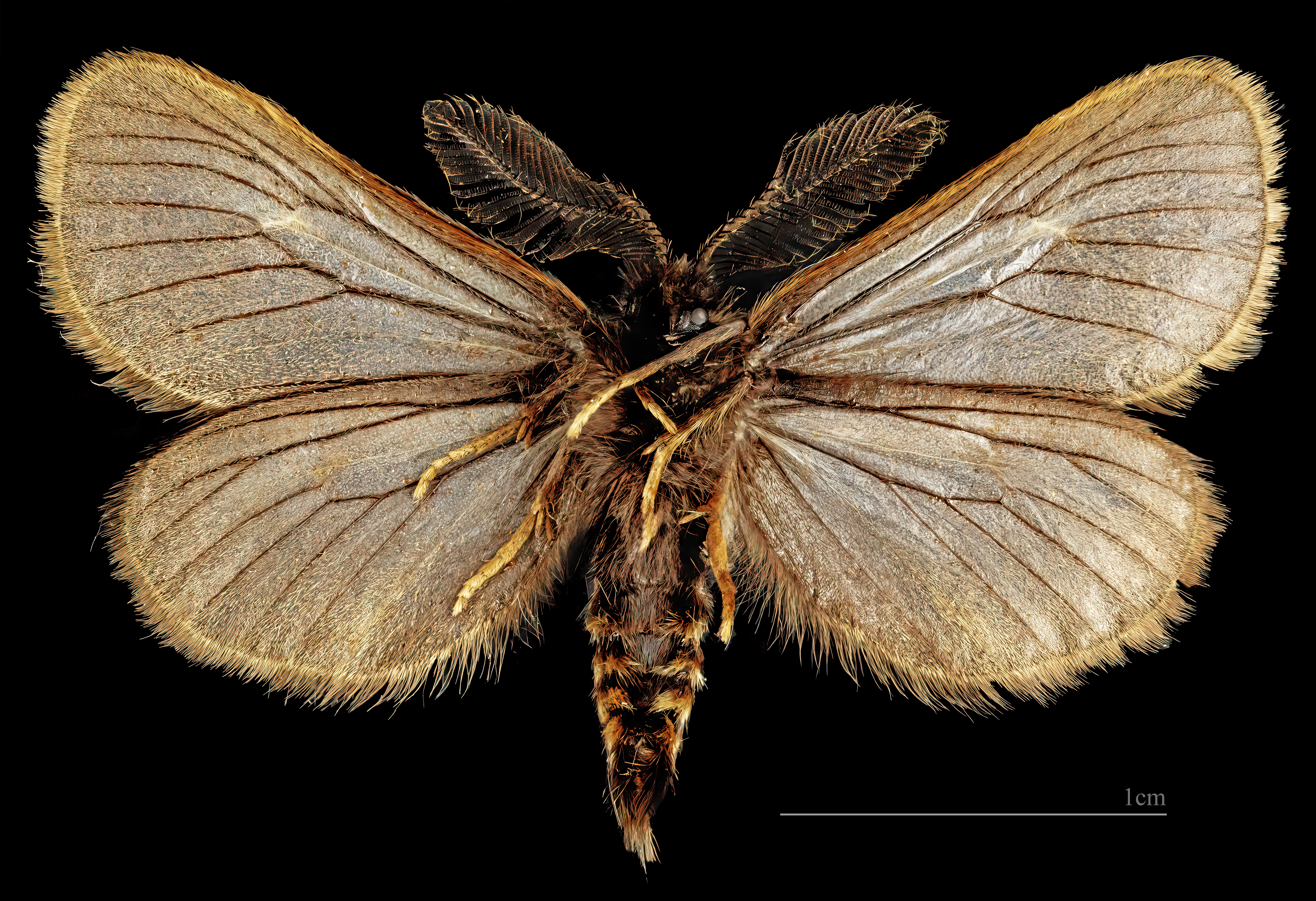
♂ △
