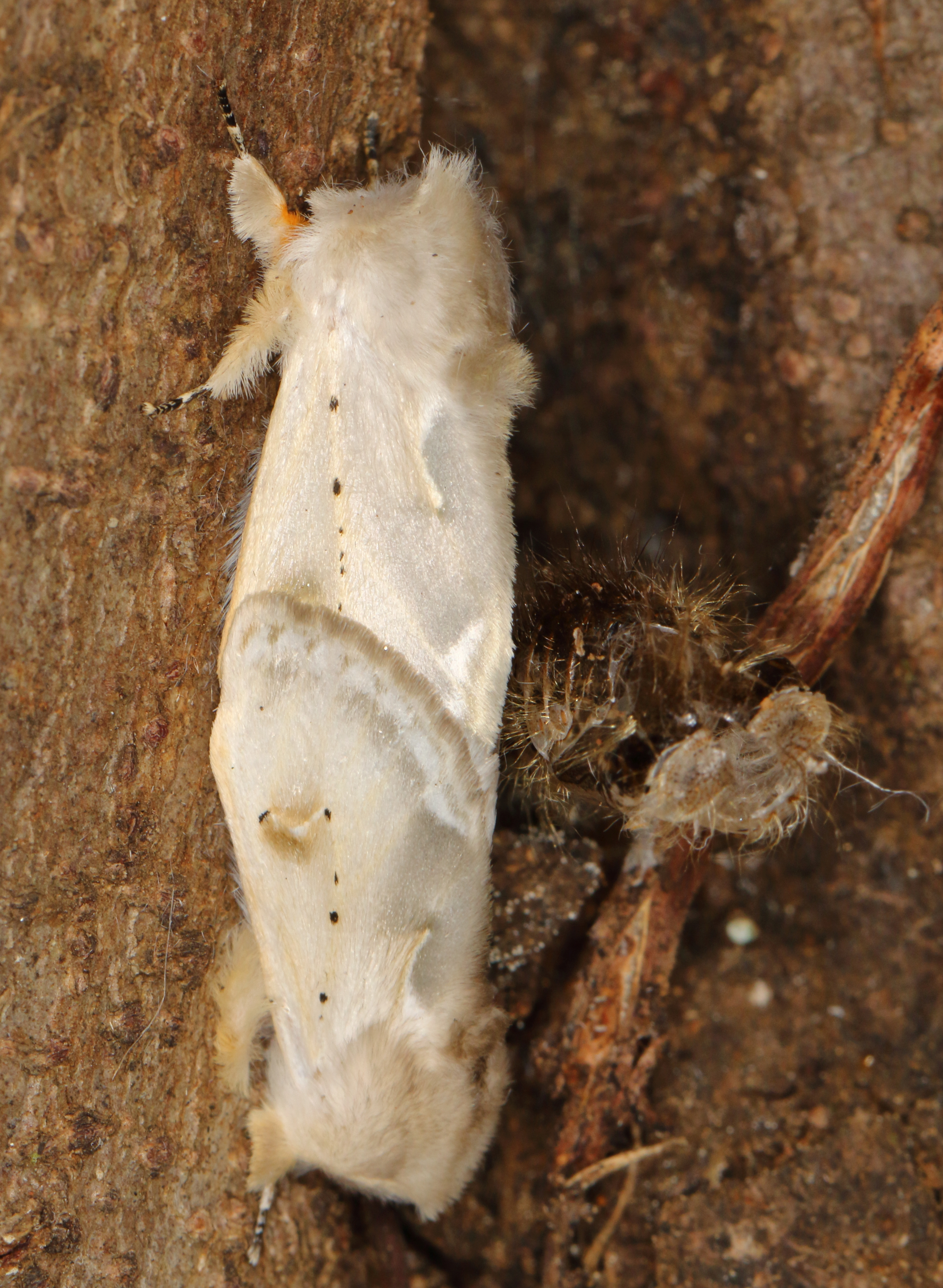
- Mating pair

Scientific classification
- Kingdom: Animalia
- Phylum: Arthropoda
- Class: Insecta
- Order: Lepidoptera
- Superfamily: Noctuoidea
- Family: Erebidae
- Genus: Naroma
- Species: N. varipes

Binomial name
- Naroma varipes (Walker, 1865)

Synonyms
- Hysibada varipes Walker, 1865; Woerdenia weyenberghi Snellen, 1872; Dasychira mabilli Rochenbrune, 1884; Orgyia mabilli

= Naroma varipes =

Fig tree moth

Species of moth

Naroma varipes, the fig tree moth, is a moth in the subfamily Lymantriinae. The species was first described by Francis Walker in 1865. It is native to tropical and southern Africa. Its larval food plants include the fig species Ficus thonningii, F. sur and F. natalensis. They have white hindwings and creamy white forewings that are marked with a row of dark dots.
