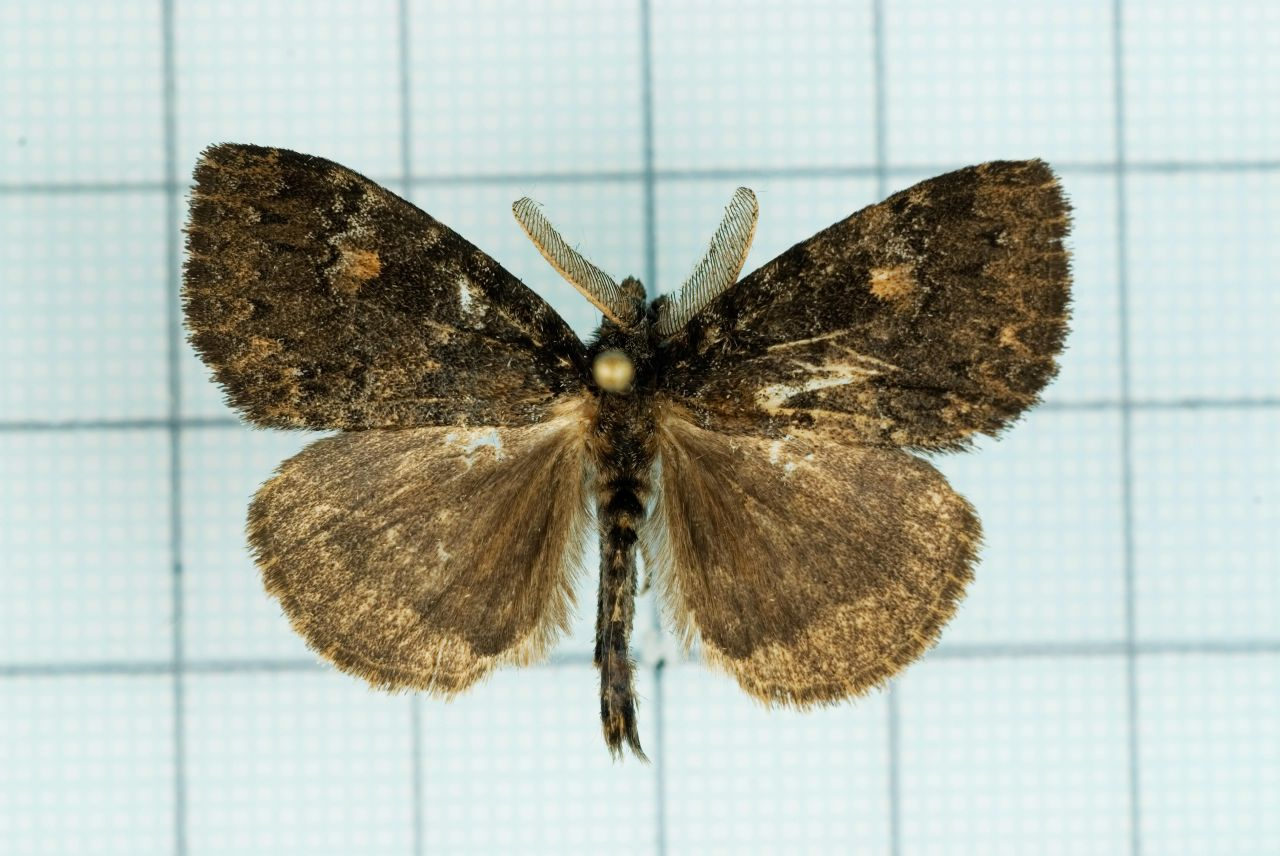
- Ilema kosemponica

Scientific classification
- Domain: Eukaryota
- Kingdom: Animalia
- Phylum: Arthropoda
- Class: Insecta
- Order: Lepidoptera
- Superfamily: Noctuoidea
- Family: Erebidae
- Tribe: Orgyiini
- Genus: Ilema; Moore, [1860]

Synonyms
- Melia Walker, 1855 (Preocc.); Cadrusia Moore, 1879; Malachitis Hampson, 1895; Neocifuna Inoue, 1982

= Ilema =

Genus of moths

Ilema is a genus of tussock moths in the family Erebidae. The genus was described by Walker in 1855 and renamed by Moore in 1860, because Walker's chosen name was preoccupied.

== Selected species ==
- Ilema altichalana Holloway, 1999 Borneo
- Ilema baruna (Moore, 1859) Java, Sumatra, Borneo
- Ilema callima Collenette, 1932
- Ilema chalana (Moore, [1860]) Java, Sumatra, Peninsular Malaysia, Borneo
- Ilema chalanoides Schintlmeister, 1994
- Ilema chloroptera (Hampson, [1893]) north-eastern Himalayas
- Ilema coreana Matsumura, 1933
- Ilema costalis (Walker, 1855) Java
- Ilema costiplaga (Walker, 1862) Borneo, Sumatra, Peninsular Malaysia
- Ilema eurydice (Butler, 1885) Japan, Korea, Amur, Askold, Tonkin
- Ilema jankowskii (Oberthür, 1884) Amur
- Ilema kosemponica (Strand, 1914)
- Ilema melanochlora Hampson, 1895
- Ilema montanata Holloway, 1982 Borneo, Sumatra
- Ilema nachiensis (Marumo, 1917)
- Ilema nigrofascia (Wileman, 1911)
- Ilema olivacea (Wileman, 1910)
- Ilema petrilineata (Bryk, 1935) Peninsular Malaysia, Borneo
- Ilema preangerensis (Heylaerts, 1892) Java, Sumatra, Borneo
- Ilema vaneeckei (Collenette, 1932) Peninsular Malaysia, Sumatra, Borneo
- Ilema virescens (Moore, 1879) Himalayas
- Ilema viridis Druce, 1899
