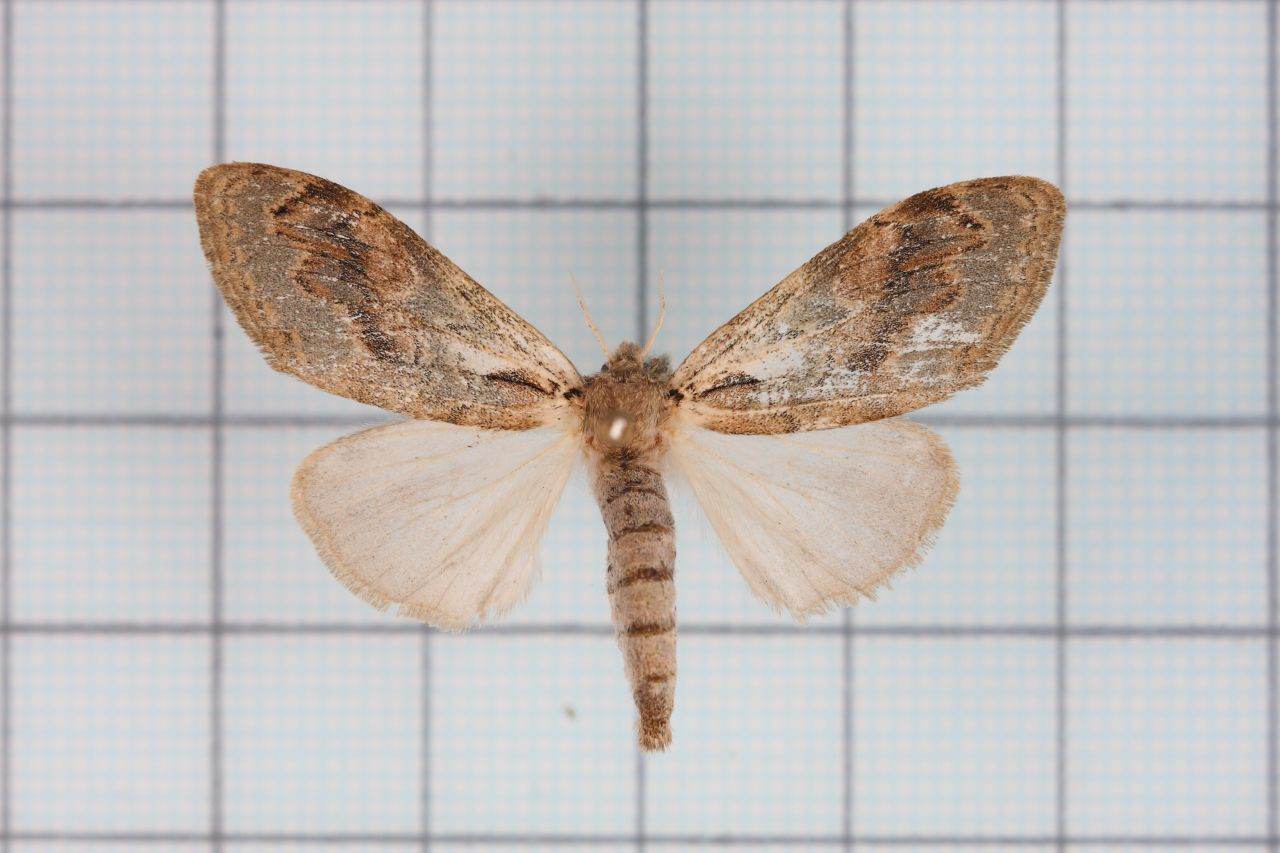
- Olene dudgeoni

Scientific classification
- Domain: Eukaryota
- Kingdom: Animalia
- Phylum: Arthropoda
- Class: Insecta
- Order: Lepidoptera
- Superfamily: Noctuoidea
- Family: Erebidae
- Tribe: Orgyiini
- Genus: Olene; Hübner, 1823

Synonyms
- Rilia Walker, 1855; Nioda Walker, 1855; Thelde Walker, 1862; Argila Walker, 1855; Turriga Walker, 1869; Pseudodura Strand, 1914

= Olene =

Genus of moths

Olene is a genus of tussock moths in the family Erebidae. The genus was erected by Jacob Hübner in 1823.

== Species ==
- Olene cookiensis (Strand, 1915)
- Olene dalbergiae (Moore, 1888)
- Olene dryina (Lower, 1900)
- Olene dudgeoni (Swinhoe, 1907)
- Olene hypersceles (Collenette, 1932)
- Olene inclusa (Walker, 1856)
- Olene magnalia (Swinhoe, 1903)
- Olene mendosa Hübner, 1823
- Olene ruficosta Bethune-Baker, 1911
- Olene tenebrosa (Walker, 1865)
