= Clethrogyna =

Scientific classification
- Kingdom: Animalia
- Phylum: Arthropoda
- Clade: Pancrustacea
- Class: Insecta
- Order: Lepidoptera
- Superfamily: Noctuoidea
- Family: Erebidae
- Tribe: Orgyiini
- Genus: Clethrogyna; Rambur, 1866

Synonyms
- Thylacigyna Rambur, 1866

Genus of moths

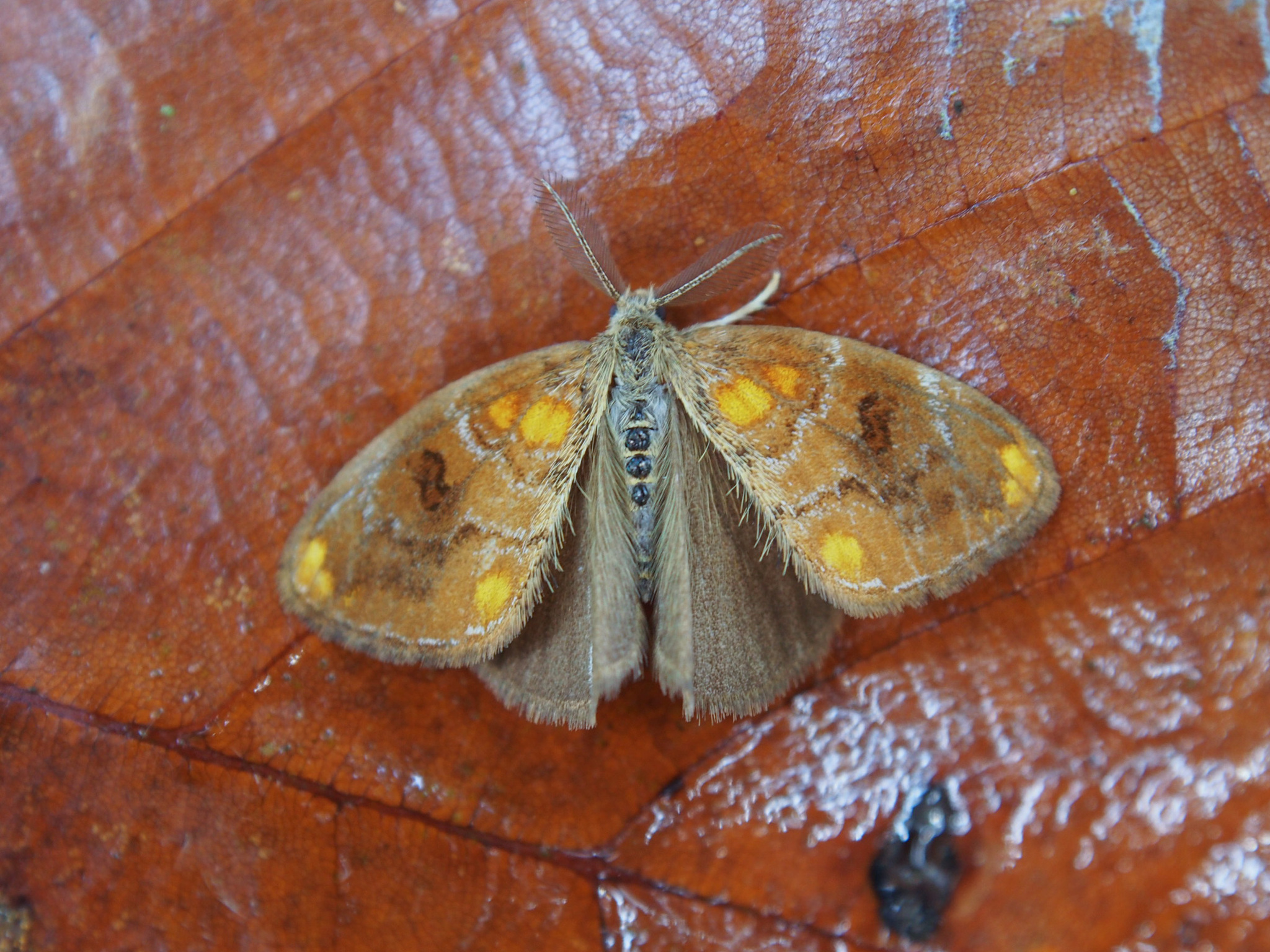
Clethrogyna turbata in Langkawi, Malaysia

Clethrogyna is a genus of tussock moths in the family Erebidae. The genus was described by Rambur in 1866.

== Species ==
- Clethrogyna antiquoides (Hübner, 1822)
- Clethrogyna aurolimbata (Guenée, 1835)
- Clethrogyna corsica (Boisduval, 1834)
- Clethrogyna dubia (Tauscher, 1806)
- Clethrogyna josephina (Austaut, 1880)
- Clethrogyna rupestris (Rambur, 1832)
- Clethrogyna splendida (Rambur, 1842)
- Clethrogyna trigotephras (Boisduval, 1829)
- Clethrogyna turbata (Butler, 1879)
