= Casama =

Scientific classification
- Kingdom: Animalia
- Phylum: Arthropoda
- Clade: Pancrustacea
- Class: Insecta
- Order: Lepidoptera
- Superfamily: Noctuoidea
- Family: Erebidae
- Subfamily: Lymantriinae
- Tribe: Orgyiini
- Genus: Casama; Walker, 1865

Genus of moths

Casama is a genus of tussock moths in the family Erebidae.

== Species ==
The following species are included in the genus.

- Casama brauni Adeoud, 1935
- Casama griseola Rothschild, 1921
- Casama hemippa Swinhoe, 1906
- Casama impura Hering, 1926
- Casama indeterminata Walker, 1865
- Casama intermissa Hering, 1926
- Casama leporina Zerny, 1935
- Casama promissa Hering, 1926
- Casama richteri Daniel, 1960
- Casama vilis Walker, 1865
