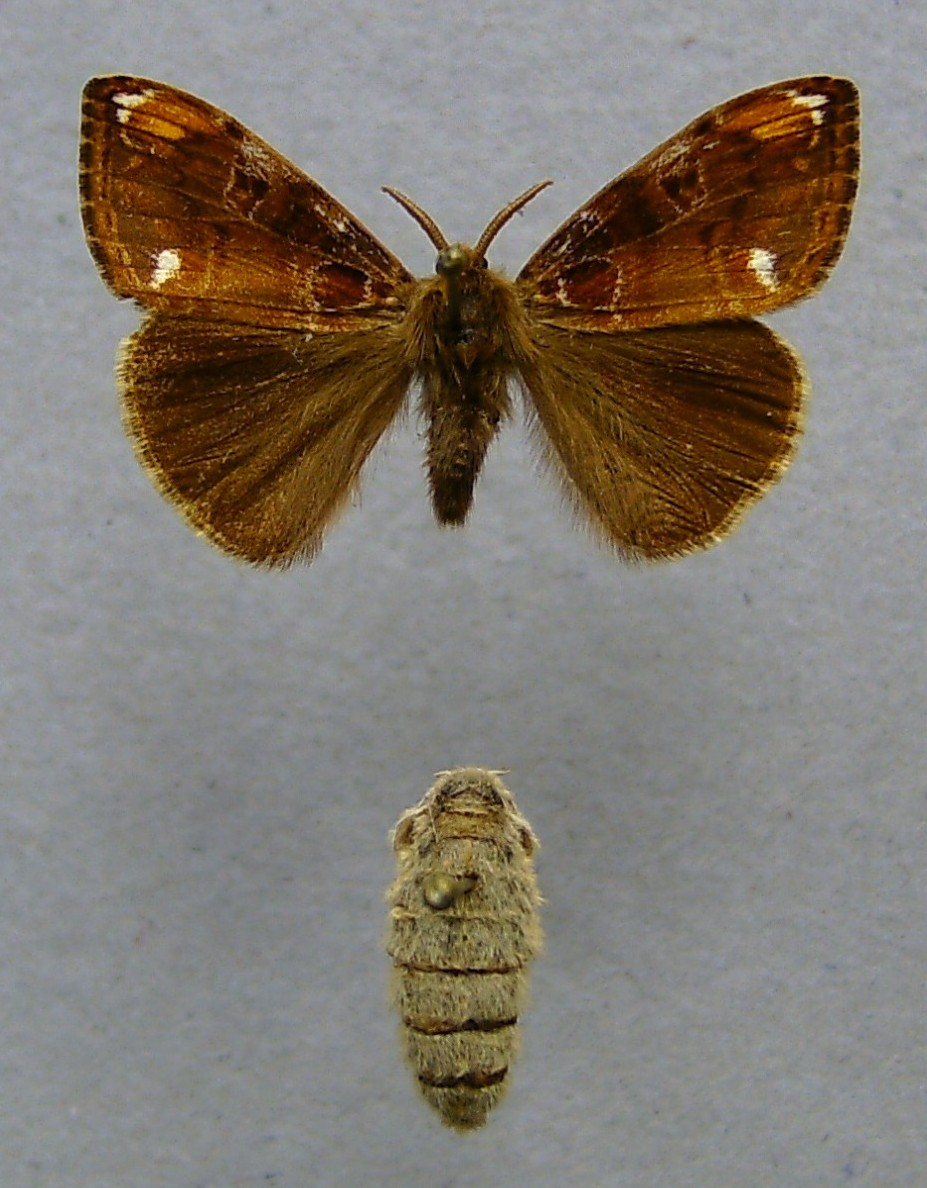
- Male (top) and female

Scientific classification
- Kingdom: Animalia
- Phylum: Arthropoda
- Clade: Pancrustacea
- Class: Insecta
- Order: Lepidoptera
- Superfamily: Noctuoidea
- Family: Erebidae
- Genus: Telochurus
- Species: T. recens

Binomial name
- Telochurus recens (Hübner, 1819)

Synonyms
- Phalaena gonostigma Linnaeus, 1767 (Unav.); Gynaephora recens Hübner, 1819; Orgyia recens (Hübner, 1819); Notolophus gonostigma Swinhoe, 1923; Orgyia approximans Butler, 1881; Notolophus approximatus Swinhoe, 1923 (misspelling); Orgyia recens f. nigrescens Lempke, 1959 (Unav.); Orgyia recens f. fusca Lempke, 1959 (Unav.); Orgyia recens f. delineata Lempke, 1959 (Unav.)

= Telochurus recens =

Species of moth

Telochurus recens, the scarce vapourer, is a moth of the subfamily Lymantriinae found in Europe. The species was first described by Jacob Hübner in 1819. The wingspan is 35 to 40 millimetres (1.4–1.6 in) for the males; the females are wingless. The moth flies from June to July depending on the location. The larvae feed on various deciduous trees, such as Crataegus and Salix species. This species has commonly been placed in the genus Orgyia but molecular analyses support its exclusion from that genus, and placement in the genus Telochurus.

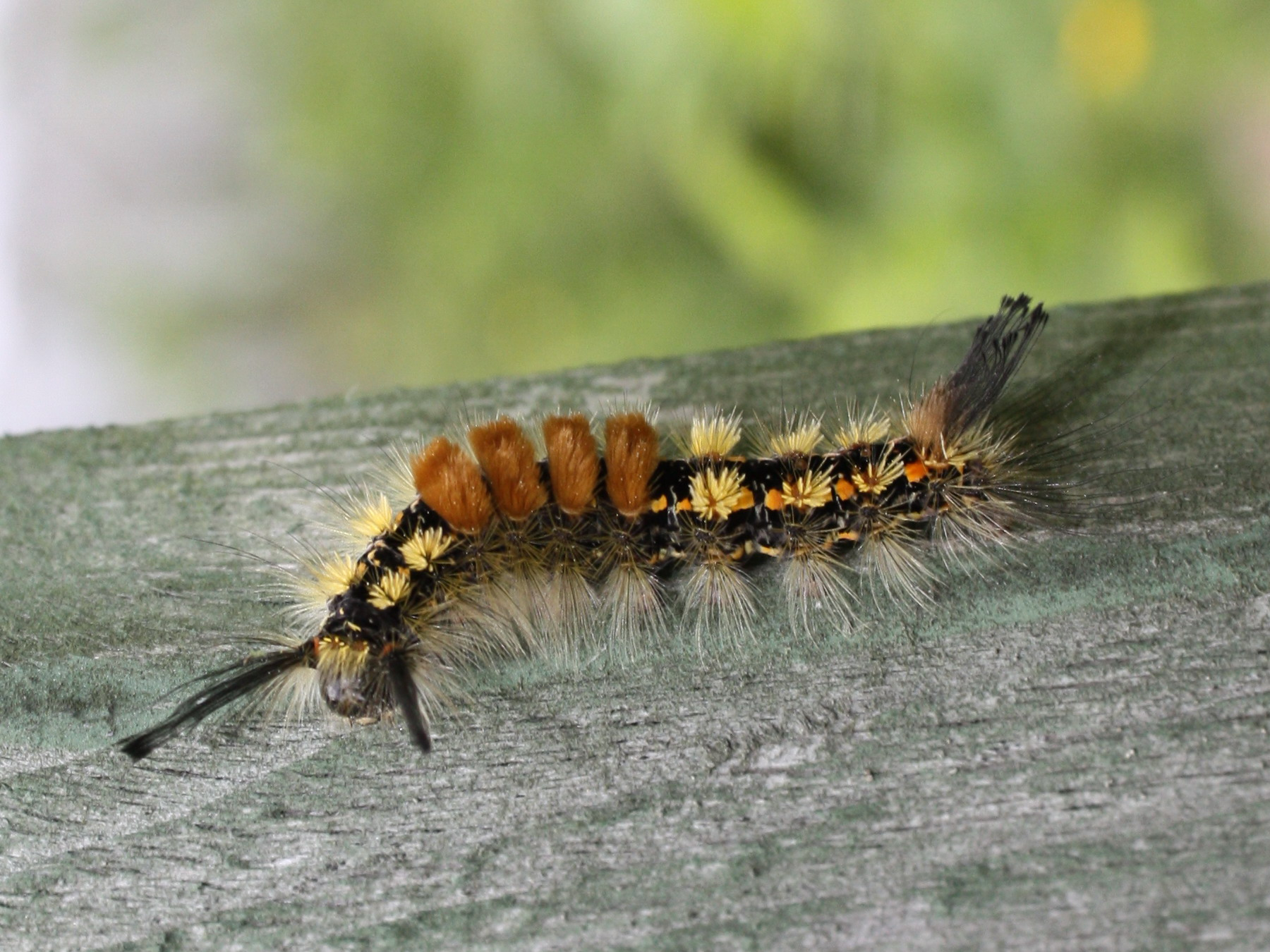
Caterpillar
