= Telochurus =

Scientific classification
- Domain: Eukaryota
- Kingdom: Animalia
- Phylum: Arthropoda
- Class: Insecta
- Order: Lepidoptera
- Superfamily: Noctuoidea
- Family: Erebidae
- Tribe: Orgyiini
- Genus: Telochurus; Maes, 1984

Genus of moths

Telochurus is a genus of tussock moths in the family Erebidae erected by Koen V. N. Maes in 1984.

== Species ==
- Telochurus diplosticta (Collenette, 1933)
- Telochurus recens (Hübner, 1819) – scarce vapourer moth
