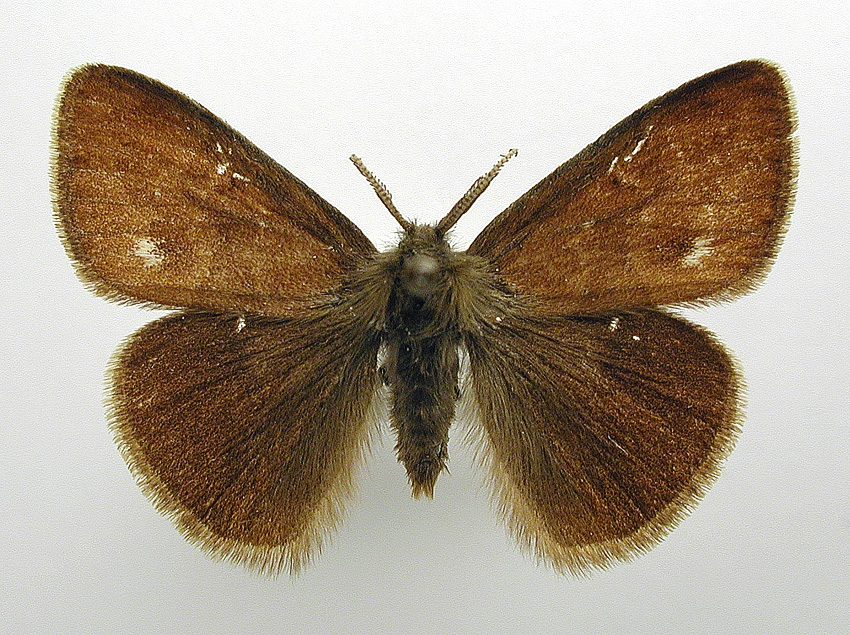
- Male

Scientific classification
- Kingdom: Animalia
- Phylum: Arthropoda
- Clade: Pancrustacea
- Class: Insecta
- Order: Lepidoptera
- Superfamily: Noctuoidea
- Family: Erebidae
- Genus: Clethrogyna
- Species: C. antiquoides

Binomial name
- Clethrogyna antiquoides (Hübner, 1822)

Synonyms
- Bombyx antiquoides Hubner, 1822; Orgyia antiquoides (Hubner, 1822); Orgyia ericae Germar, 1825; Orgyia ericae var. intermedia Frivaldszky, 1866; Clethrogyna ericae (Germar, 1825); Thylacigyna antiquoides (Hubner, 1822); Orgyia prisca Leech, 1890; Notolophus leechi Kirby, 1892; Clethrogyna unicolor Lempke, 1959

= Clethrogyna antiquoides =

Species of moth

Clethrogyna antiquoides is a moth of the family Erebidae. It is found in most of Europe, the Ural, Armenia, Mongolia, and China. This species has commonly been placed in the genus Orgyia but molecular analyses support the genus Clethrogyna as a separate lineage.

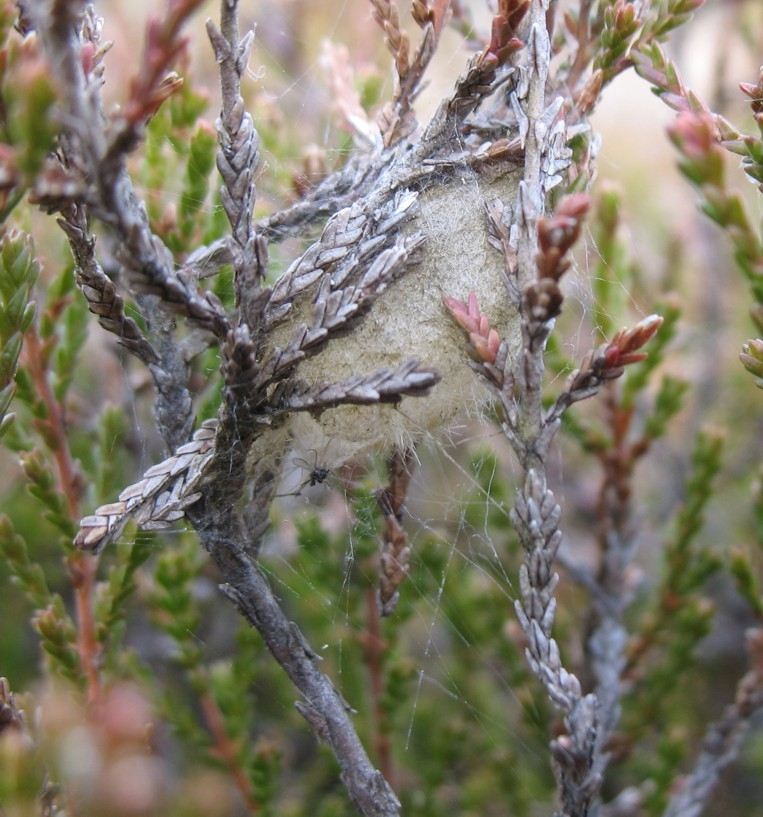
Cocoon in which the pupa, female and eggs live

The wingspan is 20–24 mm for males. The females are wingless. Adult males are on wing from July to early September in one generation in Western Europe.

The larvae feed on Rubus chamaemorus, Sorbus aucuparia, Calluna vulgaris, Vaccinium uliginosum, Andromeda polifolia, and Empetrum nigrum. Larvae can be found from May to July.
