= Penthophera lutea =

Scientific classification
- Domain: Eukaryota
- Kingdom: Animalia
- Phylum: Arthropoda
- Class: Insecta
- Order: Lepidoptera
- Superfamily: Noctuoidea
- Family: Erebidae
- Genus: Penthophera
- Species: P. lutea

Binomial name
- Penthophera lutea (Boisduval, 1847)

Synonyms
- Liparis lutea Boisduval, 1847

Species of moth

Penthophera lutea is an owlet moth species. It was first described by Jean Baptiste Boisduval in 1847. It is found in South Africa.
