= Numenoides =

Scientific classification
- Domain: Eukaryota
- Kingdom: Animalia
- Phylum: Arthropoda
- Class: Insecta
- Order: Lepidoptera
- Superfamily: Noctuoidea
- Family: Erebidae
- Tribe: Lymantriini
- Genus: Numenoides; Butler, 1879
- Species: N. grandis

Binomial name
- Numenoides grandis Butler, 1879

Genus of moths

Numenoides is a monotypic moth genus in the subfamily Lymantriinae. Its only species, Numenoides grandis, is found on Madagascar. Both the genus and the species were first described by Arthur Gardiner Butler in 1879.
