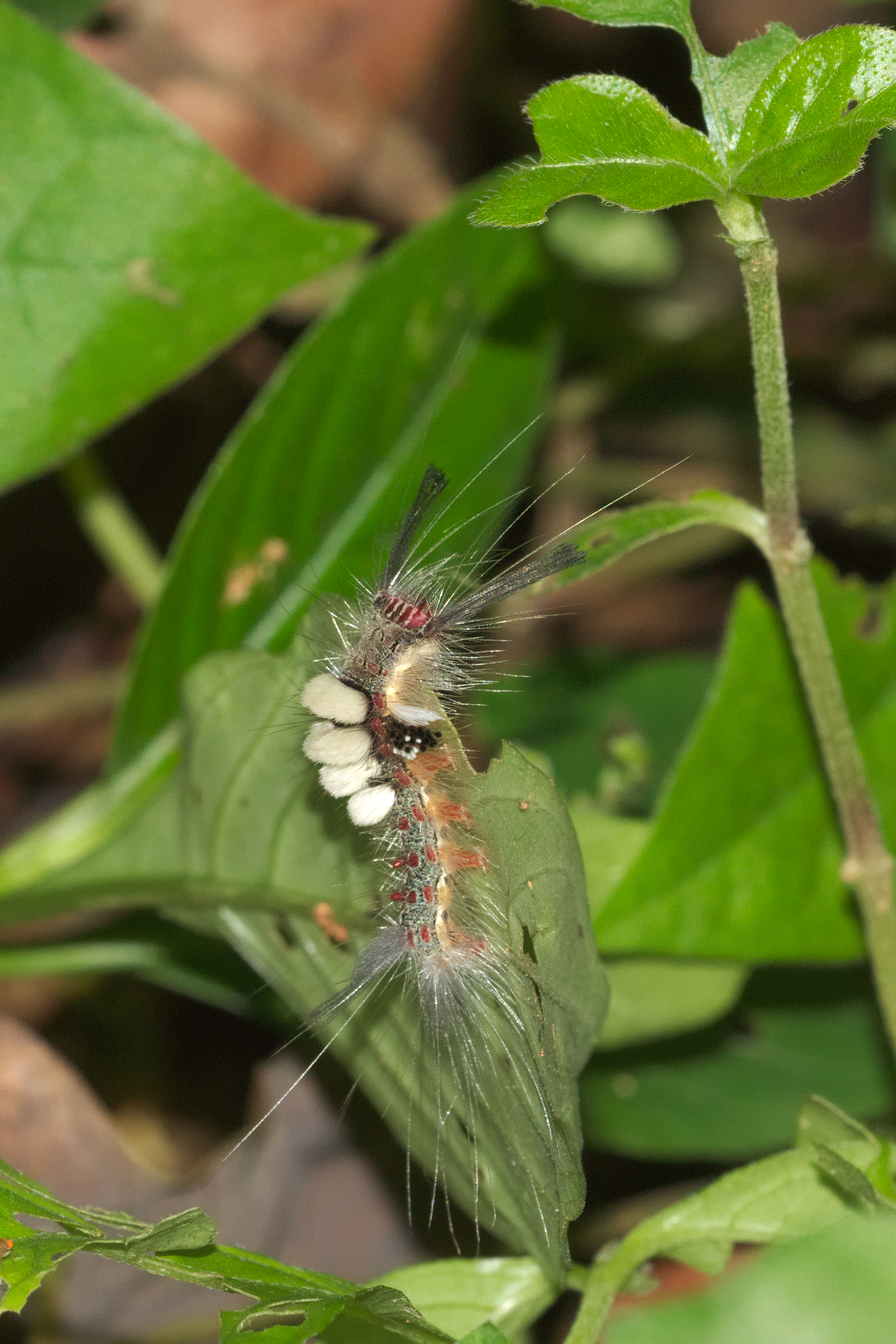

Scientific classification
- Kingdom: Animalia
- Phylum: Arthropoda
- Class: Insecta
- Order: Lepidoptera
- Superfamily: Noctuoidea
- Family: Erebidae
- Subfamily: Lymantriinae
- Tribe: Orgyiini; Wallengren, 1861

= Orgyiini =

Tribe of moths

The Orgyiini are a tribe of tussock moths of the family Erebidae. The tribe was described by Wallengren in 1861.

== Description ==
Caterpillars of the group have brushes of hairs on the top of abdominal segments 1 (adjacent to the thorax), 2, 3, 4, and 8 and pencils of hairs projected forward from the sides of the head.

== Genera ==
The tribe includes the following genera. This list may be incomplete.

- Acyphas
- Aroa
- Belinda
- Calliteara
- Casama
- Cifuna
- Clethrogyna
- Dasychira
- Dicallomera
- Eudasychira
- Griveaudyria
- Gynaephora
- Habrophylla
- Hemerophanes
- Ilema
- Laelia
- Mpanjaka
- Mylantria
- Neomardara
- Ocneria
- Olene
- Orgyia
- Pantana
- Penthophera
- Psalis
- Teia
- Telochurus
- Varatra
