= Nudariphleps =

Scientific classification
- Kingdom: Animalia
- Phylum: Arthropoda
- Clade: Pancrustacea
- Class: Insecta
- Order: Lepidoptera
- Superfamily: Noctuoidea
- Family: Erebidae
- Subfamily: Arctiinae
- Genus: Nudariphleps; Holloway, 2001
- Species: N. gauldi

Binomial name
- Nudariphleps gauldi Holloway, 2001

Genus of moths

Nudariphleps is a monotypic moth genus in the subfamily Erebidae. Its only species, Nudariphleps gauldi, is found in Borneo. Both the genus and the species were first described by Jeremy Daniel Holloway in 2001.
