= Viridichirana =

Scientific classification
- Domain: Eukaryota
- Kingdom: Animalia
- Phylum: Arthropoda
- Class: Insecta
- Order: Lepidoptera
- Superfamily: Noctuoidea
- Family: Erebidae
- Tribe: Lymantriini
- Genus: Viridichirana; Dall'Asta, 1981

Genus of moths

Viridichirana is a genus of moths in the subfamily Lymantriinae. The genus was erected by Ugo Dall'Asta in 1981.

Lepidoptera and Some Other Life Forms suggests that this name is a synonym of Dasychira Hübner, [1809].

== Species known in Africa ==
- Viridichirana chlorophila (Hering, 1926)
- Viridichirana decellei Dall'Asta, 1981
