= Griveaudyria =

Scientific classification
- Kingdom: Animalia
- Phylum: Arthropoda
- Class: Insecta
- Order: Lepidoptera
- Superfamily: Noctuoidea
- Family: Erebidae
- Tribe: Orgyiini
- Genus: Griveaudyria; Viette, 1984

Synonyms
- Lemuriana Griveaud, 1976 (Preocc.)

Genus of moths

Griveaudyria is a genus of tussock moths in the family Erebidae.

== Species ==
- Griveaudyria asymetrica (Dall'Asta, 1982)
- Griveaudyria cangia (Druce, 1887)
- Griveaudyria gabunica (Dall'Asta, 1982)
- Griveaudyria glauca (Dall'Asta, 1982)
- Griveaudyria ila (Swinhoe, 1904)
- Griveaudyria kisanganiensis (Dall'Asta, 1982)
- Griveaudyria lusamboensis (Dall'Asta, 1982)
- Griveaudyria mascarena (Butler, 1878)
- Griveaudyria melochlora (Hering, 1926)
- Griveaudyria phaeosticta (Collenette, 1937)
- Griveaudyria semotheta (Collenette, 1933)
- Griveaudyria subcangia (Dall'Asta, 1982)
- Griveaudyria subila (Dall'Asta, 1982)
- Griveaudyria viridis (Dall'Asta, 1982)
- Griveaudyria viridiumbrata (Dall'Asta, 1982)
