= Nolosia =

Scientific classification
- Kingdom: Animalia
- Phylum: Arthropoda
- Class: Insecta
- Order: Lepidoptera
- Superfamily: Noctuoidea
- Family: Erebidae
- Tribe: Lymantriini
- Genus: Nolosia; Hampson, 1900
- Species: N. marmorata

Binomial name
- Nolosia marmorata Hampson, 1900

Genus of moths

Nolosia is a monotypic moth genus in the subfamily Lymantriinae. Its only species, Nolosia marmorata, is found on Madagascar. Both the genus and the species were first described by George Hampson in 1900.
