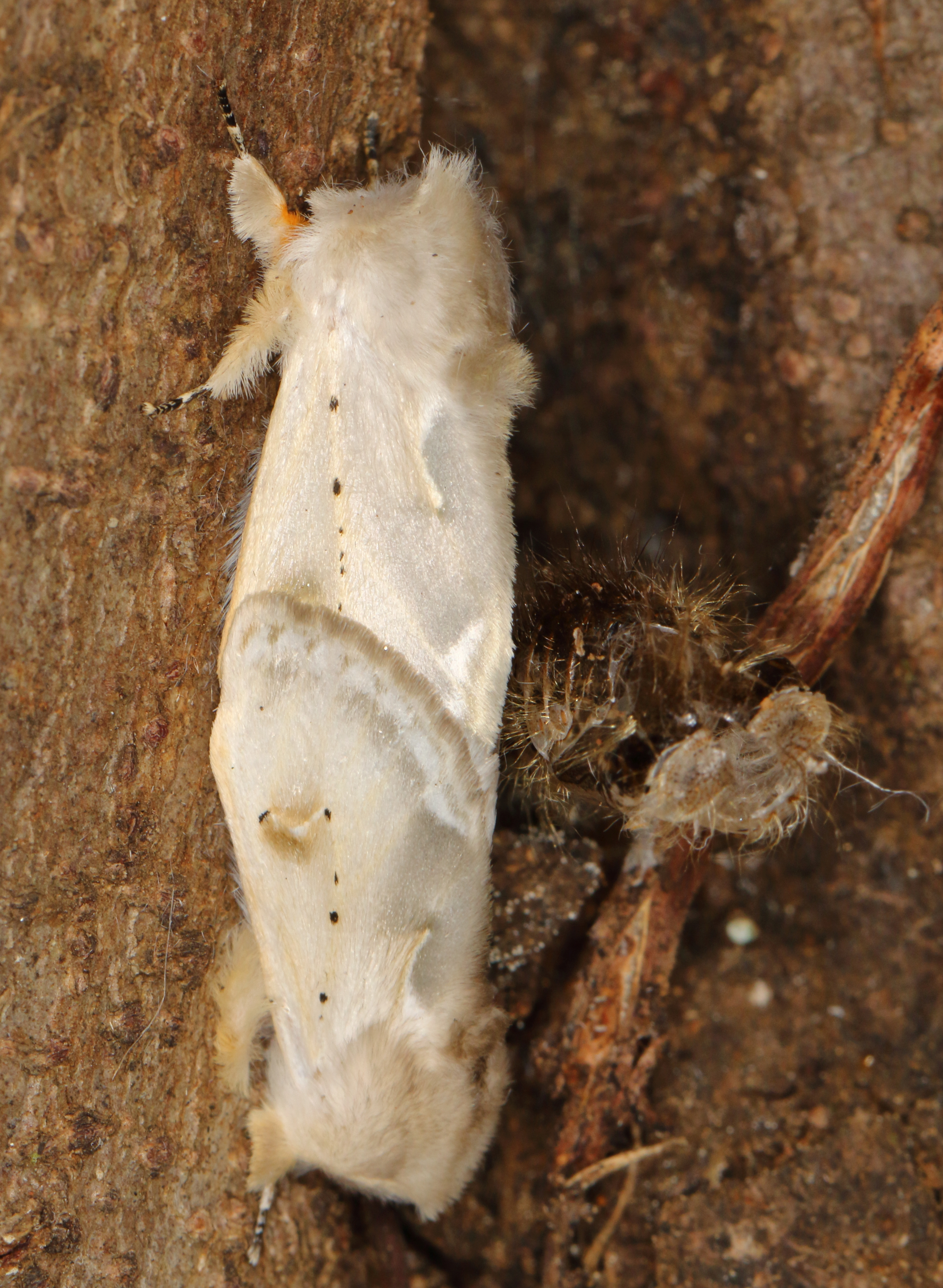
- Mating pair of Naroma varipes

Scientific classification
- Kingdom: Animalia
- Phylum: Arthropoda
- Class: Insecta
- Order: Lepidoptera
- Superfamily: Noctuoidea
- Family: Erebidae
- Tribe: Lymantriini
- Genus: Naroma; Walker, 1856

Synonyms
- Hysibada Walker, 1865; Zarfa Walker, 1869; Woerdenia Snellen, 1872

= Naroma =

Genus of moths

Naroma is a genus of moths in the subfamily Lymantriinae. The genus was erected by Francis Walker in 1856.

== Species ==
- Naroma nigrolunata Collenette, 1931 Cameroon
- Naroma madecassa Griveaud, 1971 Madagascar
- Naroma varipes (Walker, 1865) southern and western Africa
- Naroma signifera Walker, 1856 western Africa, Congo
