= Belinda zoe =

Scientific classification
- Kingdom: Animalia
- Phylum: Arthropoda
- Clade: Pancrustacea
- Class: Insecta
- Order: Lepidoptera
- Superfamily: Noctuoidea
- Family: Erebidae
- Subfamily: Lymantriinae
- Tribe: Orgyiini
- Genus: Belinda; Schintlmeister & Witt, 2014
- Species: B. zoe

Binomial name
- Belinda zoe Schintlmeister & Witt, 2014

Species of moth

Belinda is a monotypic moth genus in the subfamily Lymantriinae. Its only species, Belinda zoe, is found in Indonesia. Both the genus and species were first described by Alexander Schintlmeister and Thomas J. Witt in 2014.
