= Neorgyia =

Scientific classification
- Domain: Eukaryota
- Kingdom: Animalia
- Phylum: Arthropoda
- Class: Insecta
- Order: Lepidoptera
- Superfamily: Noctuoidea
- Family: Erebidae
- Tribe: Lymantriini
- Genus: Neorgyia; Bethune-Baker, 1908

Genus of moths

Neorgyia is a genus of moths in the subfamily Lymantriinae. The genus was erected by George Thomas Bethune-Baker in 1908.

== Species ==
- Neorgyia ochracea Bethune-Baker, 1908 New Guinea
- Neorgyia javensis Collenette, 1949 western Java
