= Volana =

Scientific classification
- Domain: Eukaryota
- Kingdom: Animalia
- Phylum: Arthropoda
- Class: Insecta
- Order: Lepidoptera
- Superfamily: Noctuoidea
- Family: Erebidae
- Tribe: Lymantriini
- Genus: Volana; Griveaud, 1976

Genus of moths

Volana is a genus of moths in the subfamily Lymantriinae. The genus was erected by Paul Griveaud in 1976.

== Species ==
Some species of this genus are:

- Volana cyclota (Collenette, 1959)
- Volana flavescens Griveaud, 1977
- Volana lakato Griveaud, 1977
- Volana lichenodes (Collenette, 1936)
- Volana masoala Griveaud, 1977
- Volana mniara (Collenette, 1936)
- Volana perineti Griveaud, 1977
- Volana phloeodes (Collenette, 1936)
