= Neomardara =

Scientific classification
- Domain: Eukaryota
- Kingdom: Animalia
- Phylum: Arthropoda
- Class: Insecta
- Order: Lepidoptera
- Superfamily: Noctuoidea
- Family: Erebidae
- Tribe: Orgyiini
- Genus: Neomardara; Hering, 1926

Genus of moths

Neomardara is a genus of moths in the subfamily Lymantriinae. The genus was described by Hering in 1926.

== Species ==
- Neomardara africana (Holland, 1893) Sierra Leone
- Neomardara divergens Collenette, 1931 Zimbabwe
