= Grammoa =

Scientific classification
- Domain: Eukaryota
- Kingdom: Animalia
- Phylum: Arthropoda
- Class: Insecta
- Order: Lepidoptera
- Superfamily: Noctuoidea
- Family: Erebidae
- Tribe: Lymantriini
- Genus: Grammoa; Aurivillius, 1904

Genus of moths

Grammoa is a genus of moths in the subfamily Lymantriinae. The genus was erected by Per Olof Christopher Aurivillius in 1904.

== Species ==
- Grammoa striata Aurivillius, 1904 western Africa
- Grammoa nigrolineata (Bethune-Baker, 1927) western Africa
