= Gallienica =

Scientific classification
- Domain: Eukaryota
- Kingdom: Animalia
- Phylum: Arthropoda
- Class: Insecta
- Order: Lepidoptera
- Superfamily: Noctuoidea
- Family: Erebidae
- Tribe: Lymantriini
- Genus: Gallienica; Griveaud, 1976

Type species
- *Panorgyria maligna Butler, 1882

Genus of moths

Gallienica is a genus of moths in the family Erebidae erected by Paul Griveaud in 1976. All the species are known from Madagascar.

== Species ==
- Gallienica ambahona (Collenette, 1954)
- Gallienica andringitra Griveaud, 1977
- Gallienica antongila Griveaud, 1977
- Gallienica brunea Griveaud, 1977
- Gallienica candida Griveaud, 1977
- Gallienica didya Griveaud, 1977
- Gallienica griveaudi (Collenette, 1959)
- Gallienica lakato Griveaud, 1977
- Gallienica lineata Griveaud, 1977
- Gallienica maligna (Butler, 1882)
- Gallienica mandraka Griveaud, 1977
- Gallienica nosivola (Collenette, 1959)
- Gallienica sanguinea (Hering, 1926)
- Gallienica sphenosema (Collenette, 1959)
- Gallienica viettei Griveaud, 1977
- Gallienica violacea Griveaud, 1977
