= Gissarus =

Scientific classification
- Domain: Eukaryota
- Kingdom: Animalia
- Phylum: Arthropoda
- Class: Insecta
- Order: Lepidoptera
- Superfamily: Noctuoidea
- Family: Erebidae
- Tribe: Lymantriini
- Genus: Gissarus; Nye, 1980
- Species: G. relictus

Binomial name
- Gissarus relictus (Kozhanchikov, 1950)

Genus of moths

Gissarus is a monotypic moth genus in the subfamily Lymantriinae described by Nye in 1980. Its only species, Gissarus relictus, was first described by Igor Vasilii Kozhanchikov in 1950. It is found in Tajikistan.
