= Neoliparina =

Scientific classification
- Domain: Eukaryota
- Kingdom: Animalia
- Phylum: Arthropoda
- Class: Insecta
- Order: Lepidoptera
- Superfamily: Noctuoidea
- Family: Erebidae
- Tribe: Lymantriini
- Genus: Neoliparina; Schultze, 1934
- Species: N. paradoxa

Binomial name
- Neoliparina paradoxa Schultze, 1934

Genus of moths

Neoliparina is a monotypic moth genus in the subfamily Lymantriinae. Its only species, Neoliparina paradoxa, is found in the Central African Republic. Both the genus and the species were first described by Schultze in 1934.
