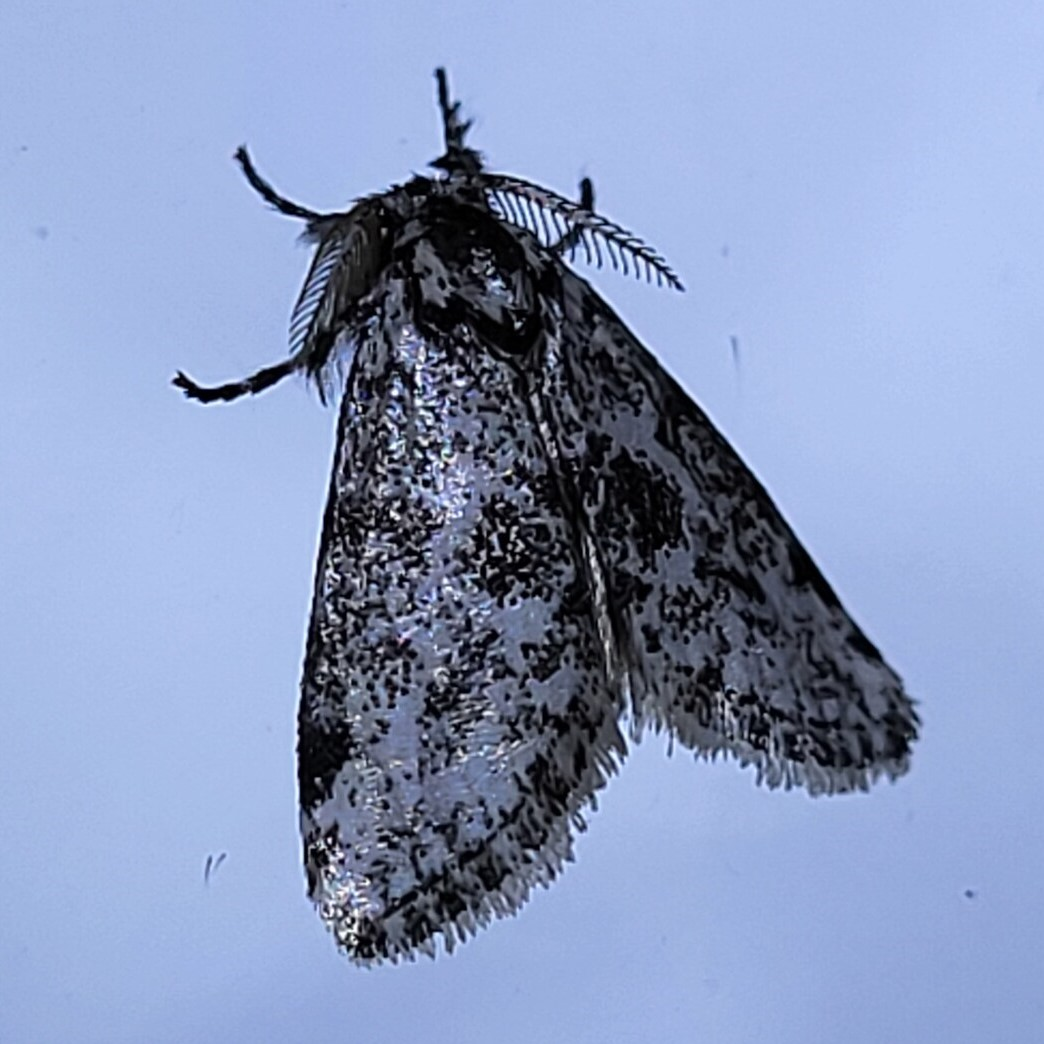
- Noliproctis sogai

Scientific classification
- Kingdom: Animalia
- Phylum: Arthropoda
- Clade: Pancrustacea
- Class: Insecta
- Order: Lepidoptera
- Superfamily: Noctuoidea
- Family: Erebidae
- Subfamily: Lymantriinae
- Tribe: Lymantriini
- Genus: Noliproctis; Hering, 1926

= Noliproctis =

Genus of moths

Noliproctis is a genus of moths in the subfamily Lymantriinae described by Hering in 1926.

== Species ==
- Noliproctis milupa Nye, 1980
- Noliproctis robinsoni Griveaud, 1977
- Noliproctis sogai (Griveaud, 1973)
- Noliproctis vadoni Griveaud, 1977
