= Vohitra =

Scientific classification
- Kingdom: Animalia
- Phylum: Arthropoda
- Class: Insecta
- Order: Lepidoptera
- Superfamily: Noctuoidea
- Family: Erebidae
- Tribe: Lymantriini
- Genus: Vohitra; Griveaud, 1976
- Species: V. melissograpta

Binomial name
- Vohitra melissograpta (Collenette, 1936)

Synonyms
- Dasychira melissograpta Collenette, 1936

Genus of moths

Vohitra is a monotypic moth genus in the subfamily Lymantriinae erected by Paul Griveaud in 1976. Its only species, Vohitra melissograpta, was first described by Cyril Leslie Collenette in 1936. It is known from Madagascar.
