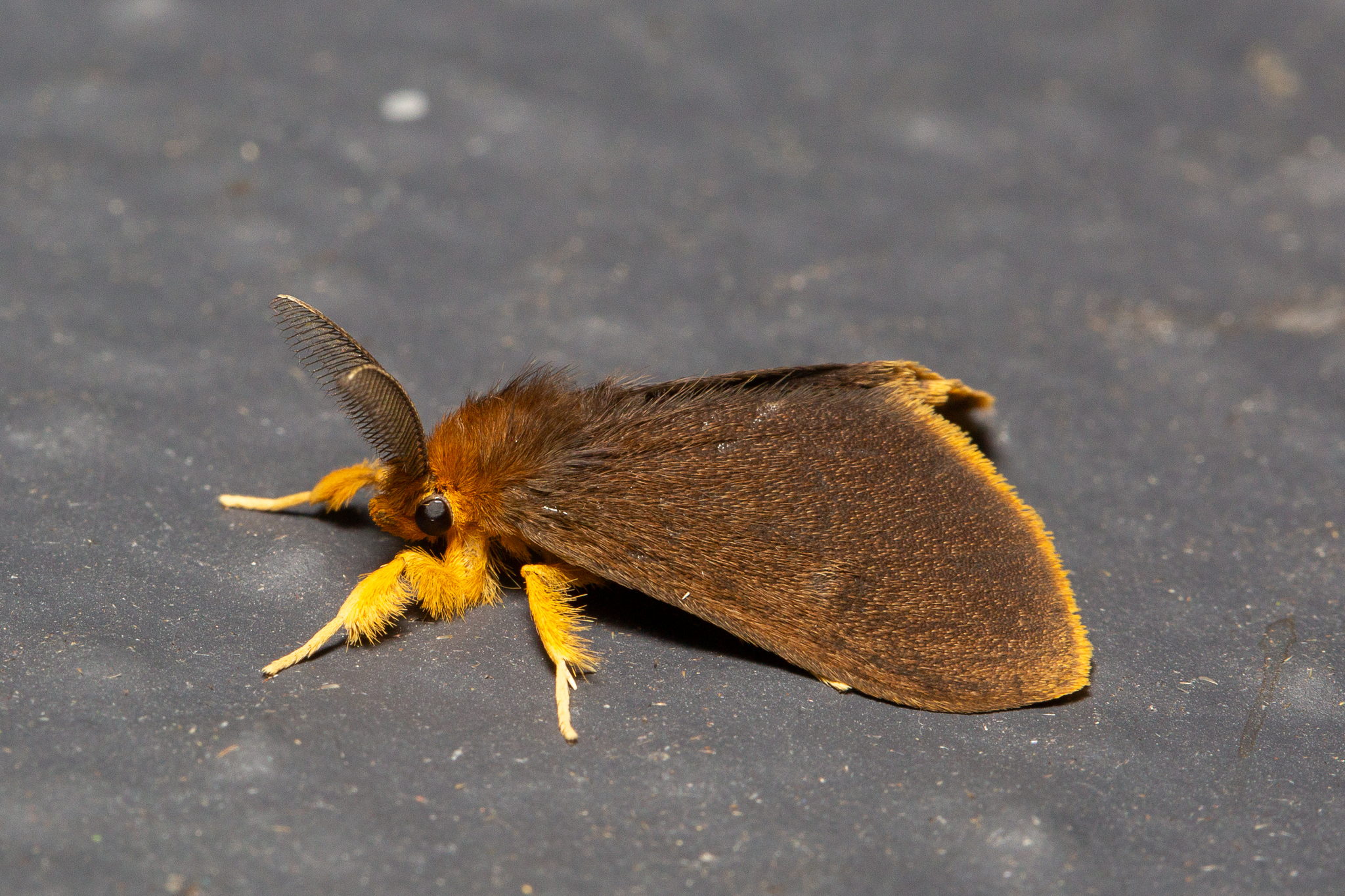
- Pantana lithosioides

Scientific classification
- Kingdom: Animalia
- Phylum: Arthropoda
- Clade: Pancrustacea
- Class: Insecta
- Order: Lepidoptera
- Superfamily: Noctuoidea
- Family: Erebidae
- Tribe: Orgyiini
- Genus: Pantana; Walker, 1855

Synonyms
- Caenina Felder, 1861

= Pantana =

Genus of moths

Pantana is a genus of tussock moths in the family Erebidae. The genus was erected by Francis Walker in 1855.

== Species ==
The following species are included in the genus.

- Pantana adara Moore, 1859
- Pantana albifascia Walker, 1865
- Pantana albipes Matsumura, 1921
- Pantana azona Collenette, 1960
- Pantana baswana Moore, 1859
- Pantana delineata Walker, 1855
- Pantana droa Swinhoe, 1906
- Pantana eurygania Druce, 1899
- Pantana flavivenosa Candèze, 1927
- Pantana hitamputeh Collenette, 1938
- Pantana interjecta Swinhoe, 1891
- Pantana leucogramma Felder, 1874
- Pantana limbifera Strand, 1911
- Pantana lithosioides Walker, 1862
- Pantana luisa Pagenstecher, 1885
- Pantana luteiceps Swinhoe, 1896
- Pantana luzonensis Semper, 1898
- Pantana lymantrioides Felder, 1861
- Pantana macrotera Collenette, 1935
- Pantana melantera Collenette, 1932
- Pantana mindanensis Semper, 1898
- Pantana neurabrunnea Bethune-Baker, 1911
- Pantana nigrolimbata Leech, 1899
- Pantana phyllostachysae Chao, 1977
- Pantana pluto Leech, 1890
- Pantana seriatopunctata Matsumura, 1921
- Pantana simplex Leech, 1899
- Pantana sinica Moore, 1877
- Pantana substrigosa (Walker, 1855)
- Pantana terminata Walker, 1865
- Pantana visaya Semper, 1898
- Pantana visum Hübner, 1825
