= Belinda, Virginia =

Unincorporated community in Virginia, United States

- Unincorporated community
- Location in Virginia Location in the United States
- Coordinates: 37°54′41″N 75°39′43″W
- Country: United States
- State: Virginia
- County: Accomack
- Time zone: UTC−5 (Eastern (EST))
  - Summer (DST): UTC−4 (EDT)
- GNIS feature ID: 1499113

Belinda is an unincorporated community in Accomack County, Virginia, United States.
