= Varmina =

Scientific classification
- Domain: Eukaryota
- Kingdom: Animalia
- Phylum: Arthropoda
- Class: Insecta
- Order: Lepidoptera
- Superfamily: Noctuoidea
- Family: Erebidae
- Tribe: Lymantriini
- Genus: Varmina; Moore, 1888
- Species: V. indica

Binomial name
- Varmina indica (Walker, 1855)

Synonyms
- Gluphisia indica Walker, 1855

Genus of moths

Varmina is a monotypic moth genus in the subfamily Lymantriinae described by Frederic Moore in 1888. Its only species, Varmina indica, was first described by Francis Walker in 1855. It is found in the East Indies.
