= Varatra =

Scientific classification
- Domain: Eukaryota
- Kingdom: Animalia
- Phylum: Arthropoda
- Class: Insecta
- Order: Lepidoptera
- Superfamily: Noctuoidea
- Family: Erebidae
- Tribe: Lymantriini
- Genus: Varatra; Griveaud, 1976
- Species: V. acosmeta

Binomial name
- Varatra acosmeta (Collenette, 1939)

Synonyms
- Dasychira acosmeta Collenette, 1939; Usimbara acosmeta Collenette, 1939

Genus of moths

Varatra is a monotypic moth genus in the subfamily Lymantriinae erected by Paul Griveaud in 1976. Its only species, Varatra acosmeta, was first described by Cyril Leslie Collenette in 1939. It is found on Madagascar.
