= List of lymantriid genera: D =

The large moth subfamily Lymantriinae contains the following genera beginning with D:

- Daplasa
- Dasychira
- Dasychiroides
- Dasychoproctis
- Decelleria
- Dendrophleps
- Desmoloma
- Dicallomera
- Dura
- Dyasma
