= List of lymantriid genera: Z =

The large moth subfamily Lymantriinae contains the following genera beginning with Z:

- Zavana
