= Dendrophleps =

Scientific classification
- Kingdom: Animalia
- Phylum: Arthropoda
- Clade: Pancrustacea
- Class: Insecta
- Order: Lepidoptera
- Superfamily: Noctuoidea
- Family: Erebidae
- Tribe: Leucomini
- Genus: Dendrophleps; Hampson, 1893

Genus of moths

Dendrophleps is a genus of tussock moths in the family Erebidae.

== Species ==
The following species are included in the genus.

- Dendrophleps chionobosca Collenette, 1955
- Dendrophleps cretacea Holland, 1999
- Dendrophleps lobipennis Swinhoe, 1892
- Dendrophleps semihyalina Hampson, 1893
