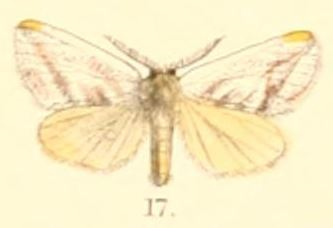

Scientific classification
- Domain: Eukaryota
- Kingdom: Animalia
- Phylum: Arthropoda
- Class: Insecta
- Order: Lepidoptera
- Superfamily: Noctuoidea
- Family: Erebidae
- Genus: Daplasa
- Species: D. irrorata

Binomial name
- Daplasa irrorata Moore, 1879

= Daplasa irrorata =

Species of moth

Daplasa irrorata is a moth of the subfamily Lymantriinae first described by Frederic Moore in 1879. It is found in India.
