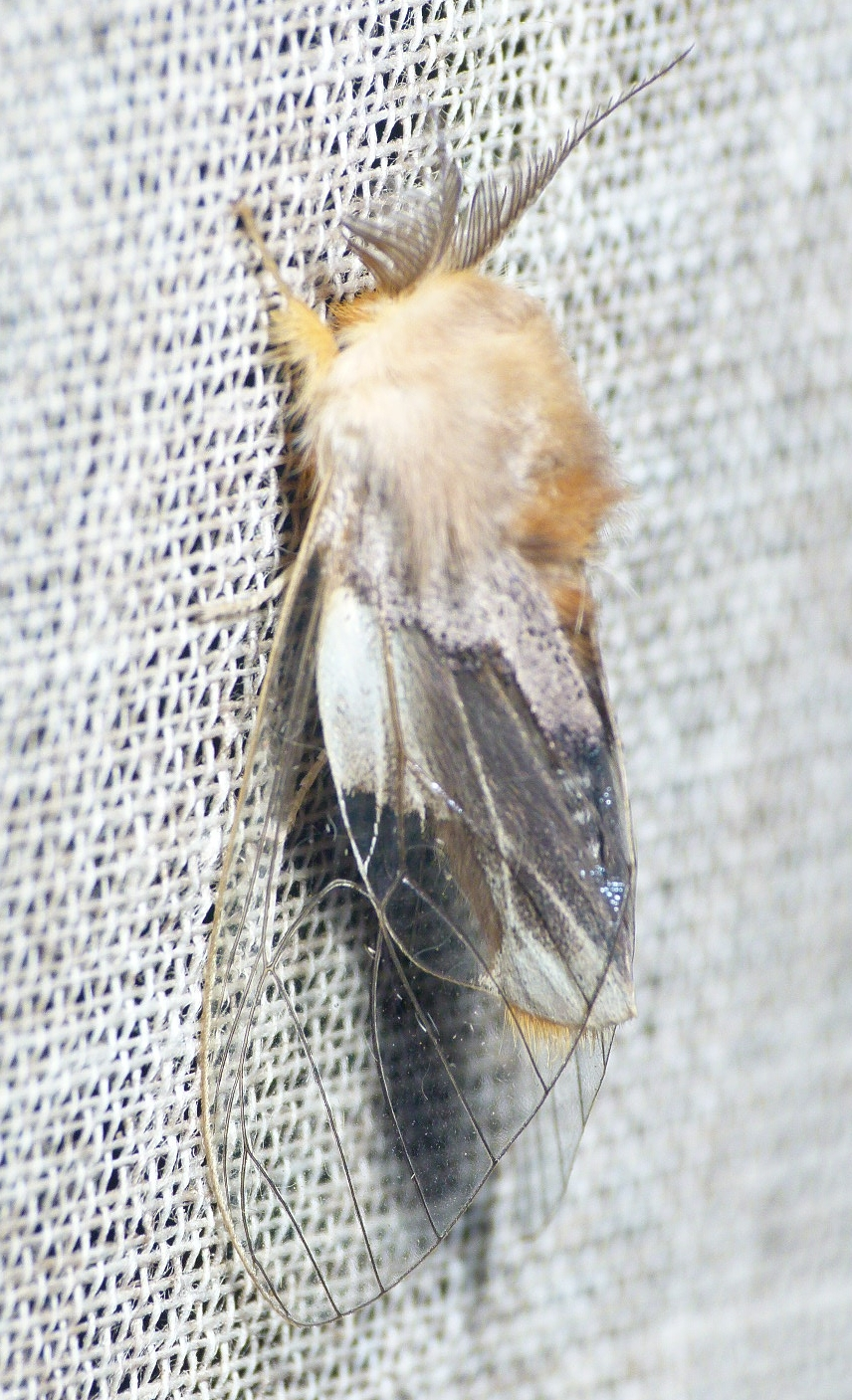
- Male Perina nuda

Scientific classification
- Kingdom: Animalia
- Phylum: Arthropoda
- Clade: Pancrustacea
- Class: Insecta
- Order: Lepidoptera
- Superfamily: Noctuoidea
- Family: Erebidae
- Tribe: Leucomini
- Genus: Perina; Walker, 1855

Synonyms
- Bradytera Toxopeus, 1948

= Perina =

Genus of moths

Perina is a genus of tussock moths in the family Erebidae. It was described by Francis Walker in 1855 and is found in China, Sri Lanka and throughout India.

== Description ==
In the male, the palpi are extremely minute. Antennae with long branches. Mid and hind tibia with minute terminal spur pairs. Forewings with extremely oblique outer margin. Vein 3 from before angle of cell. Vein 4 and 5 on a short stalk. Vein 6 from upper angle. Veins 9 to 10 are stalked, where veins 7 and 10 being off towards apex. Hindwings with veins 3 from before angle of cell. Veins 4 and 5 stalked and vein 6 absent.

In the female, the antennae have shorter branches. Forewings with the outer margin not so oblique. Hindwings with veins 4 and 5 from angle of cell. Vein 6 present and stalked with vein 7.

== Species ==
The following species are included in the genus.

- Perina kalisi Collenette, 1949
- Perina lodra Moore, 1859
- Perina nuda Fabricius, 1787
- Perina psamma Collenette, 1933
- Perina pura Walker, 1869
- Perina sunda Holloway, 1999
