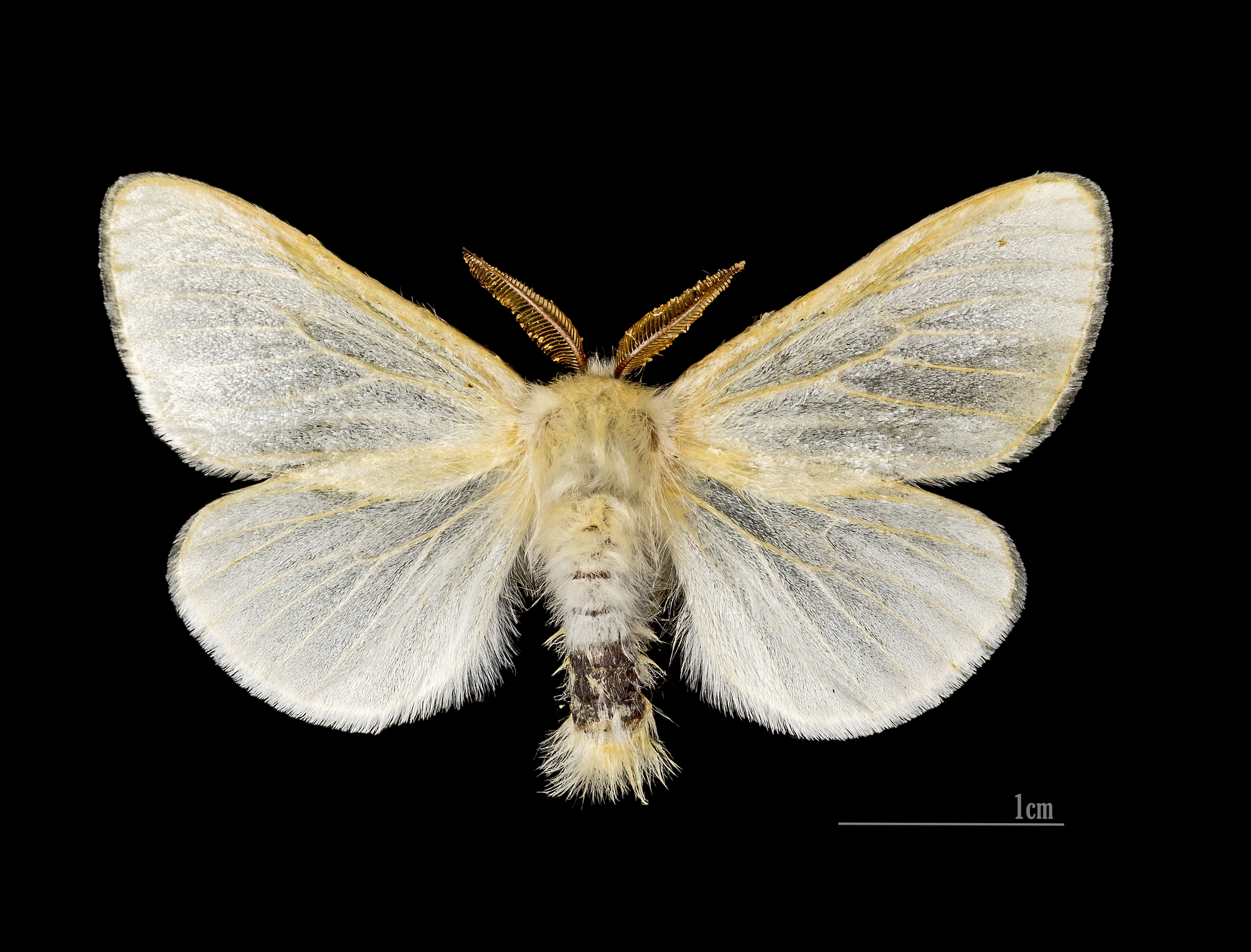
- Leucoma salicis

Scientific classification
- Kingdom: Animalia
- Phylum: Arthropoda
- Clade: Pancrustacea
- Class: Insecta
- Order: Lepidoptera
- Superfamily: Noctuoidea
- Family: Erebidae
- Subfamily: Lymantriinae
- Tribe: Leucomini
- Genus: Leucoma; Hübner, 1822

Synonyms
- Laria Schrank, 1802; Stilpnotia Westwood, 1843; Leucosia Rambur, 1866; Nymphyxis Grote, 1895; Charala Moore, 1884; Candidata Toxopeus, 1948

= Leucoma =

Genus of moths

Leucoma is a genus of tussock moths in the family Erebidae. The species are well distributed in Palearctic, Ethiopian, and Oriental regions along with New Britain and Ireland. It was described by Jacob Hübner in 1822.

== Description ==
Palpi upturned, reaching vertex of head. Antennae bipectinated in both sexes, where branches long in male and short in female. Hind tibia has pair of spurs. Forewings with vein 3 from before angle of cell. Veins 4 and 5 from angle. Vein 6 from upper angle. Veins 7 to 9 are stalked. Hindwings with vein 3 from before angle of cell. Vein 5 from above angle. Veins 6 and 7 stalked or from cell.

== Species ==
- Leucoma albina Plötz, 1880
- Leucoma aneuphrix Collenette, 1960
- Leucoma aristera Collenette, 1960
- Leucoma atripalpia (Hampson, 1910)
- Leucoma bicolorata Holloway, 1999
- Leucoma chrysoscela (Collenette, 1934)
- Leucoma clara (Walker, 1865)
- Leucoma cryptadia Collenette, 1938
- Leucoma dexitera Collenette, 1960
- Leucoma dicella Collenette, 1960
- Leucoma euphrix Collenette, 1960
- Leucoma flavifrons (Hampson, 1910)
- Leucoma flavosulphurea Erschoff, 1872
- Leucoma fletcheri Collenette, 1958
- Leucoma impressa Snellen, 1877
- Leucoma lechrisemata Collenette, 1959
- Leucoma lirioessa Collenette, 1960
- Leucoma luteipes (Walker, 1855)
- Leucoma melanoscela (Collenette, 1934)
- Leucoma nigrolineata Bethune-Baker, 1927
- Leucoma nitida Swinhoe, 1903
- Leucoma niveata (Walker, 1865)
- Leucoma ochripes (Moore, 1879)
- Leucoma ochropoda (Eversmann, 1847)
- Leucoma ogovensis (Holland, 1893)
- Leucoma parallela (Collenette, 1934)
- Leucoma parva Plötz, 1889
- Leucoma purissima (Hering, 1926)
- Leucoma salicis (Linnaeus, 1758) – satin moth
- Leucoma sartus (Erschoff, 1874)
- Leucoma sericea (Moore, 1879)
- Leucoma sevastopuloi Collenette, 1955
- Leucoma subargentea Felder, 1861
- Leucoma surtur (A. Bang-Haas, 1912)
- Leucoma wiltshirei Collenette, 1938
- Leucoma xanthocephala (Hering, 1926)
- Leucoma xanthosoma (Holland, 1893)
