= Desmoloma =

Scientific classification
- Domain: Eukaryota
- Kingdom: Animalia
- Phylum: Arthropoda
- Class: Insecta
- Order: Lepidoptera
- Superfamily: Noctuoidea
- Family: Noctuidae
- Subfamily: Dyopsinae
- Genus: Desmoloma; Felder, 1874

Synonyms
- Mantruda Schaus, 1906

Genus of moths

Desmoloma is a genus of moths in the subfamily Lymantriinae. The genus was described by Felder in 1874.

== Species ==
- Desmoloma chironomus (Dyar, 1910) Colombia, French Guiana
- Desmoloma erratica (Schaus, 1906) Venezuela
- Desmoloma modesta (Dognin, 1923) Brazil (Amazonas)
- Desmoloma mollis (Dyar, 1910) French Guiana
- Desmoloma styracis Felder, 1874 Venezuela, French Guiana
