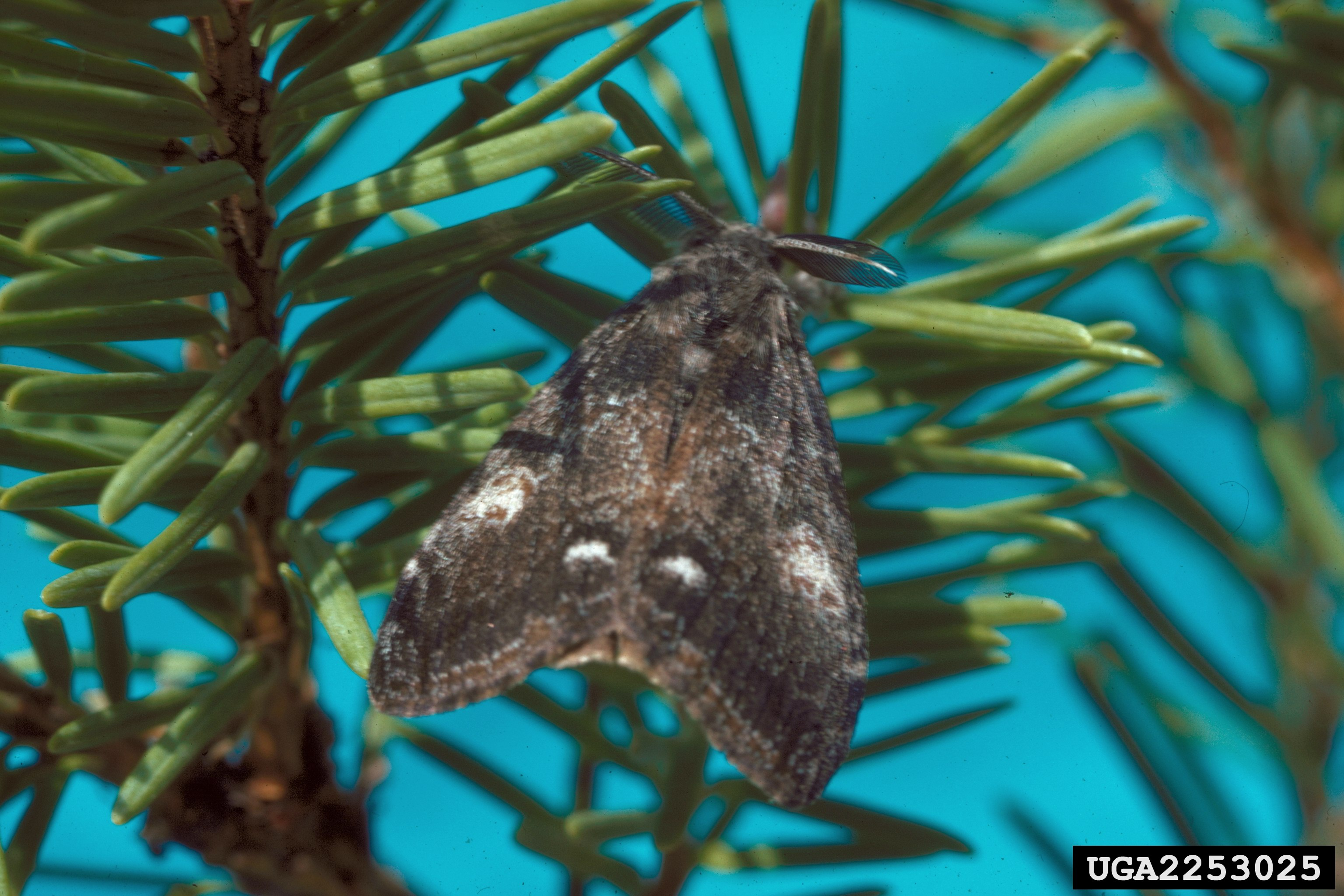
- Adult male
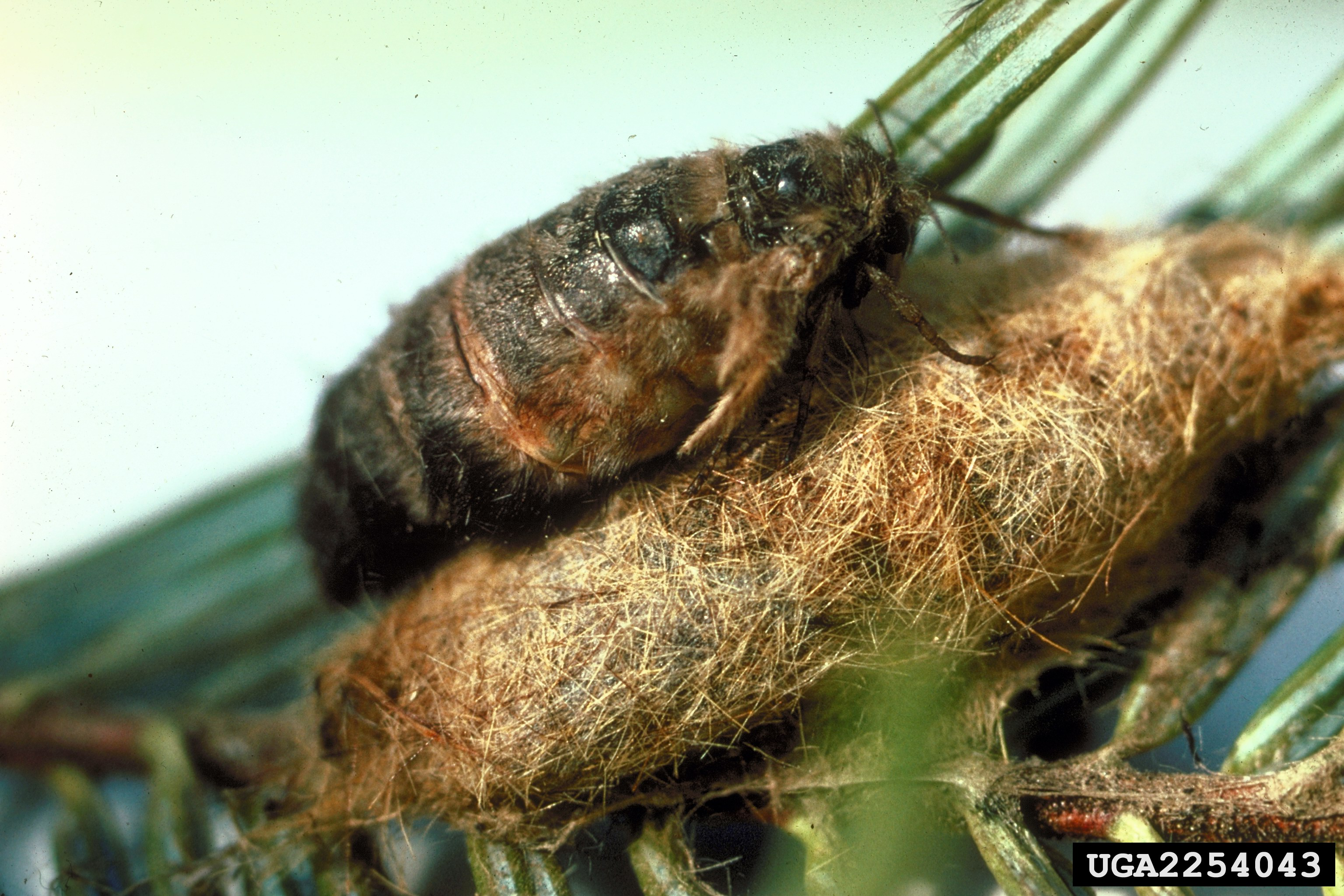
- Adult female

Scientific classification
- Domain: Eukaryota
- Kingdom: Animalia
- Phylum: Arthropoda
- Class: Insecta
- Order: Lepidoptera
- Superfamily: Noctuoidea
- Family: Erebidae
- Genus: Orgyia
- Species: O. pseudotsugata

Binomial name
- Orgyia pseudotsugata (McDunnough, 1921)

Synonyms
- Hemerocampa pseudotsugata McDunnough, 1921

= Orgyia pseudotsugata =

Douglas-fir tussock moth

Species of moth

Orgyia pseudotsugata, the Douglas-fir tussock moth, is a moth of the subfamily Lymantriinae first described by James Halliday McDunnough in 1921. It is found in western North America. Its population periodically irrupts in cyclical outbreaks. The caterpillars feed on the needles of Douglas fir, true fir, and spruce in summer, and moths are on the wing from July or August to November.

== Description ==
Adult males are grayish brown moths with mottled light and dark markings. The males' wingspread is 25–34 mm (0.98–1.34 in). When the wings are spread open, the brown hindwings can be seen. Individuals in the northern part of its range are darker and southern populations are lighter. Antennae are plumose (feathery). Females are flightless with only rudimentary wings. Larvae (caterpillars) are 20–26 mm (0.79–1.02 in) and colorful with red spots, white spines, conspicuous red-tipped white tufts or "tussocks", and dense bunches of long, black hairs projecting to the front and behind.

== Range and host plants ==
The Douglas-fir tussock moth is native to forests of western North America and outbreaks have been identified in British Columbia, Idaho, Washington, Oregon, Nevada, California, Arizona, and New Mexico. Outbreaks occur in cycles around eight to twelve years and usually last up to four years, sometimes longer. Reports from Idaho and Washington indicate 2011 had a major outbreak. The larvae feed on Pseudotsuga and Abies species, especially Douglas fir, grand fir, and white fir.

== Life cycle ==
Eggs hatch in spring (May to June) and the young larvae begin feeding on new foliage (the current season’s growth of needles). Later, they feed on both new and old foliage. The movement of the caterpillars is the main means of biological dispersal. They produce long, silky threads which can catch the wind when they drop from one branch to another. They produce loose webbing which forms a netting. In this cocoon, they pupate in July or August. Adults emerge and are active as late as November. The flightless females stay near the cocoons from which they emerged and mate straight away. Eggs are spherical and white and are laid in a mass which protects them through winter. Because the female is sedentary, population outbreaks always form in place.

== Management ==
One key to management of outbreaks is detection. Entomologists monitor forests using an early warning system of pheromone traps. Outbreaks subside on their own, but silvicultural techniques for managing affected timber can be employed, or the chemical carbaryl can be sprayed aerially.

== Subspecies ==
- O. p. pseudotsugata (British Columbia to Idaho, western Montana, eastern Washington, Oregon, Colorado, Nevada, California)
- O. p. morosa Ferguson, 1978 (British Columbia to California)
- O. p. benigna Ferguson, 1978 (Arizona)

== Gallery ==
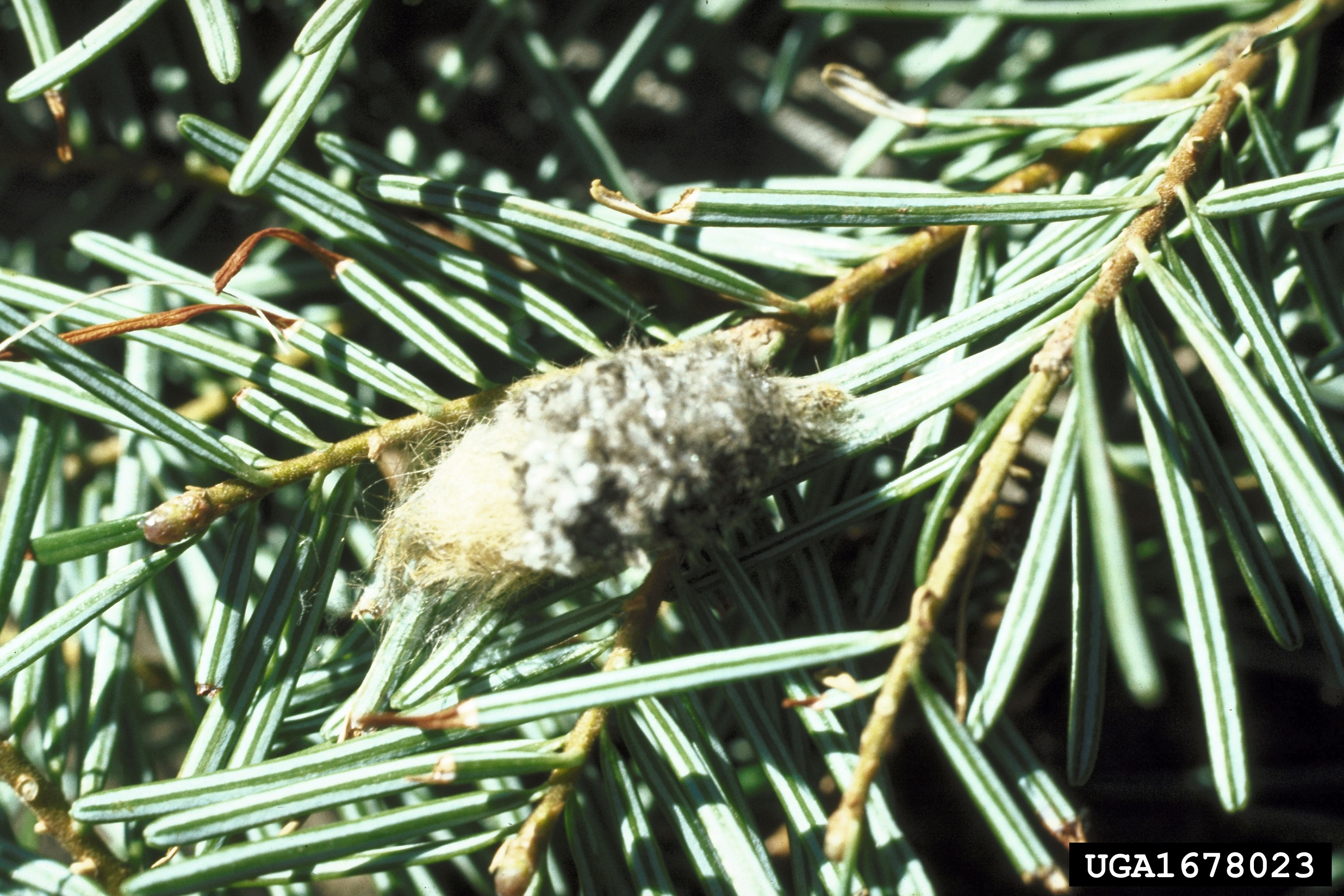
Eggs

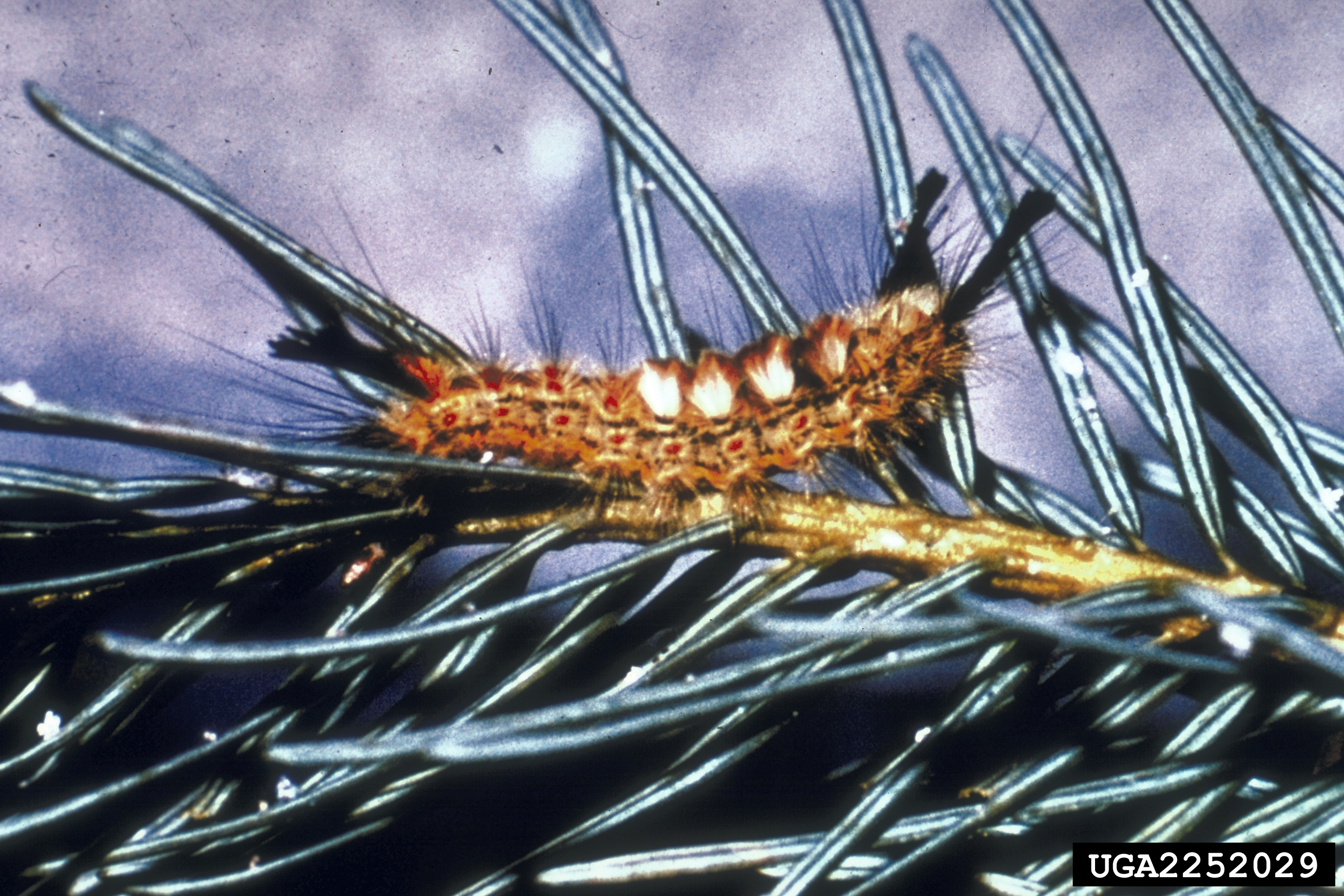
Larva

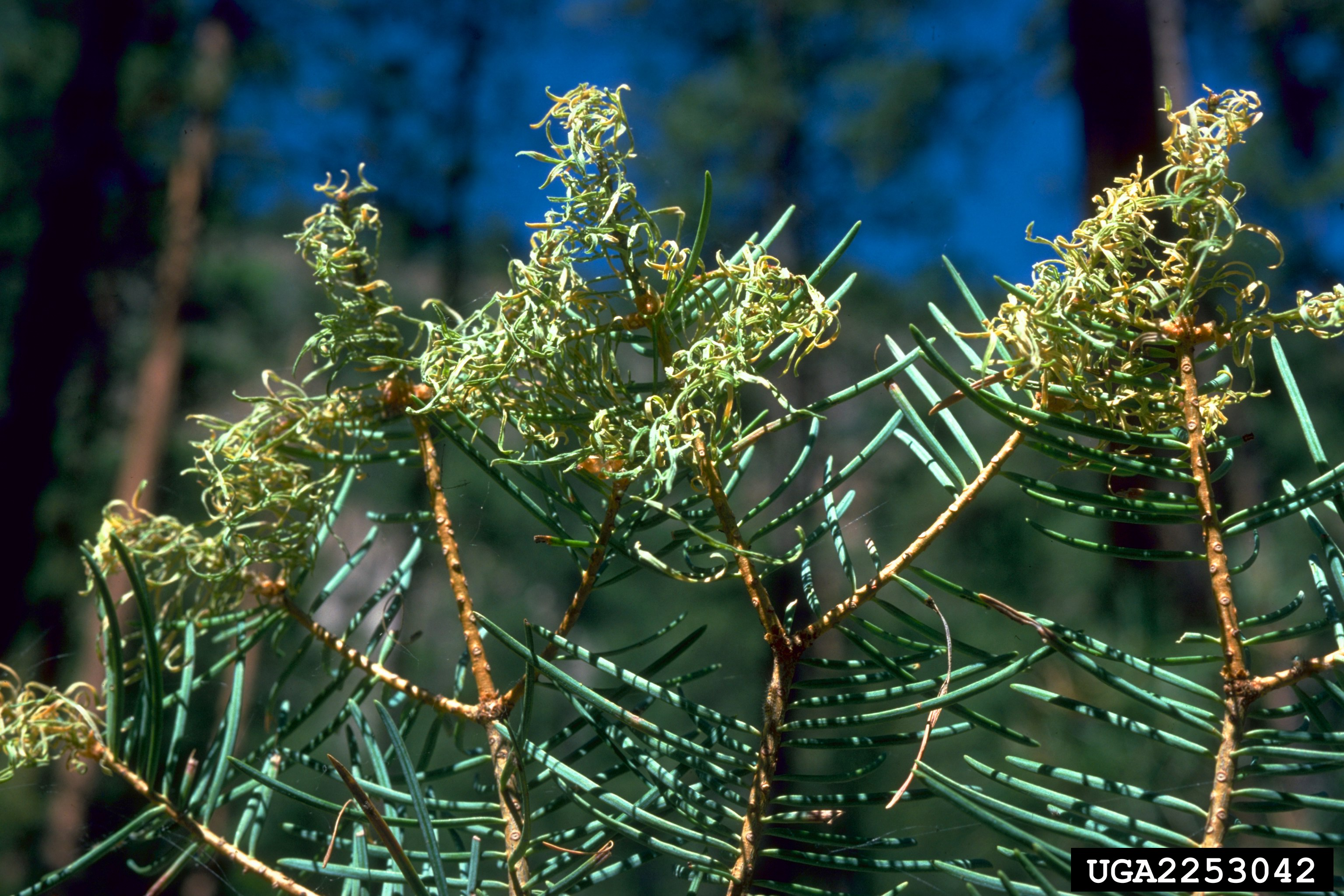
Damage

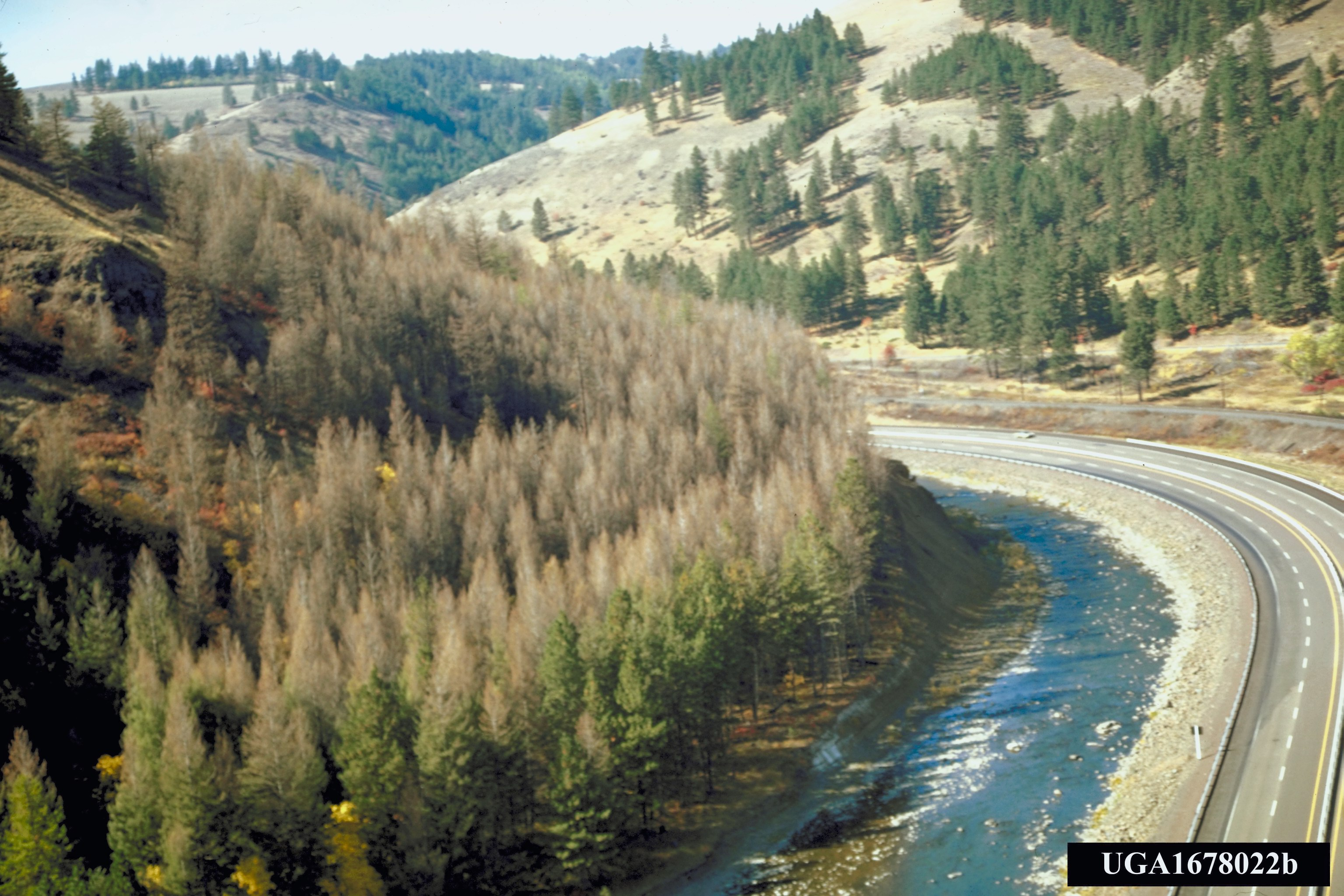
Damage

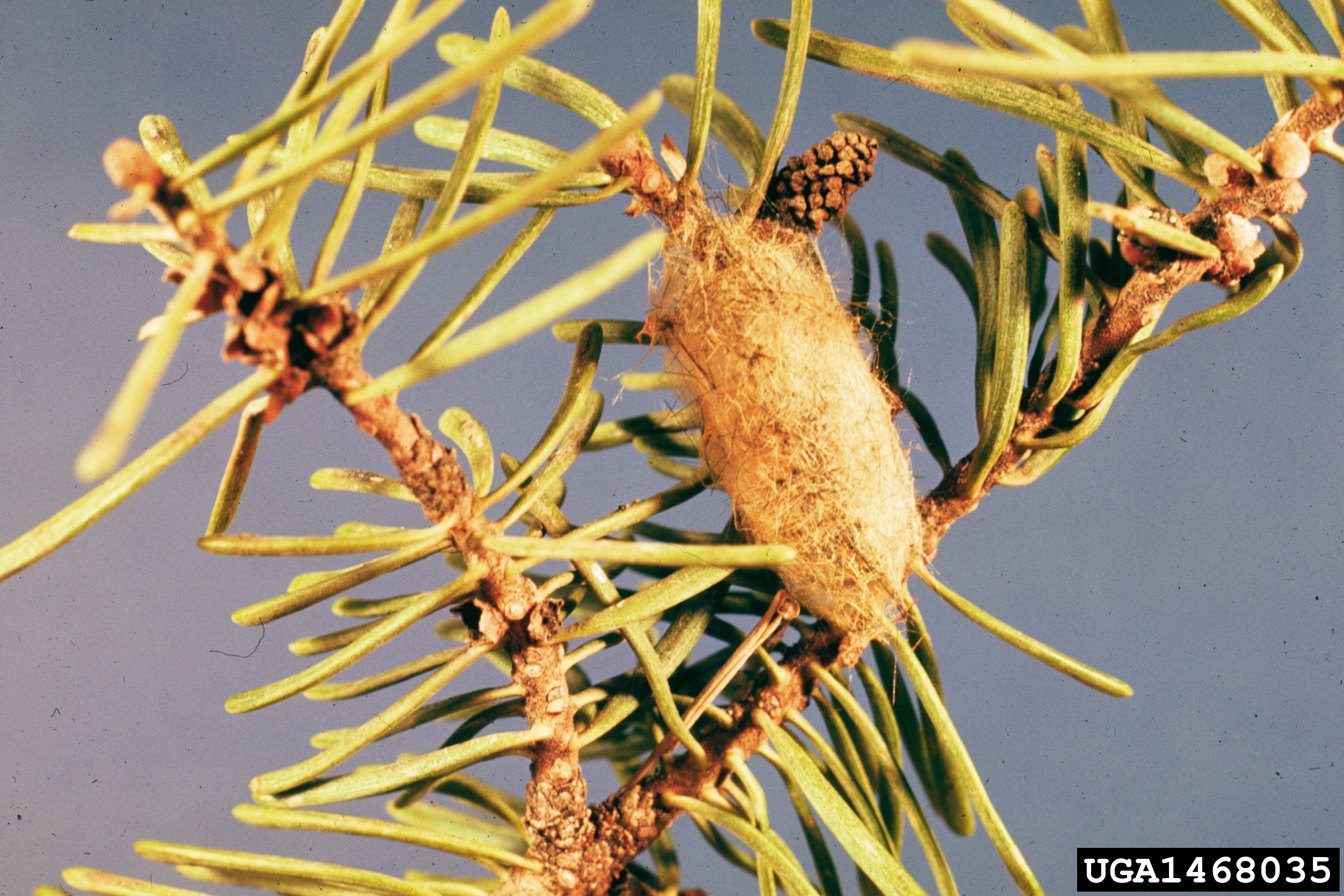
Cocoon

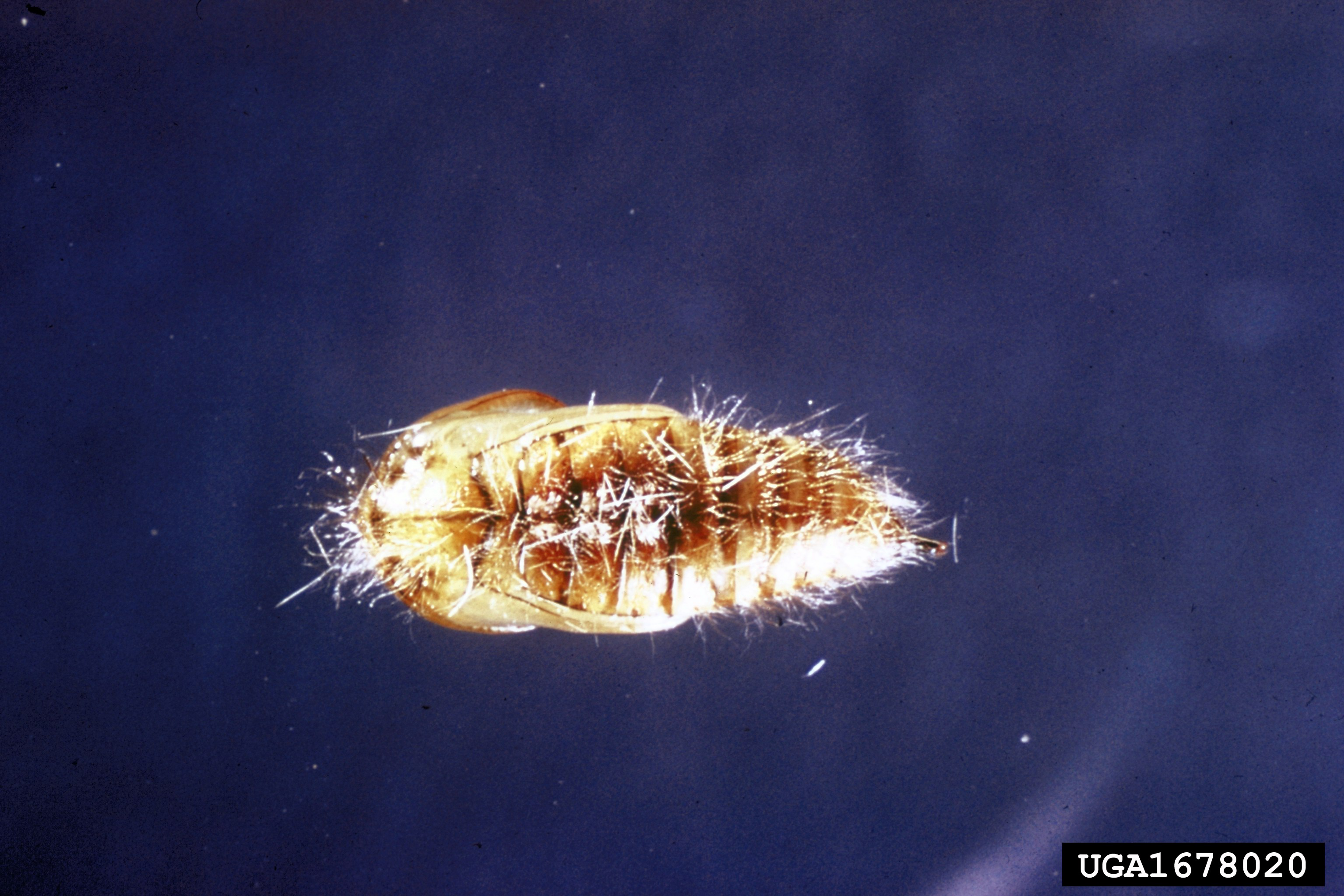
Pupa

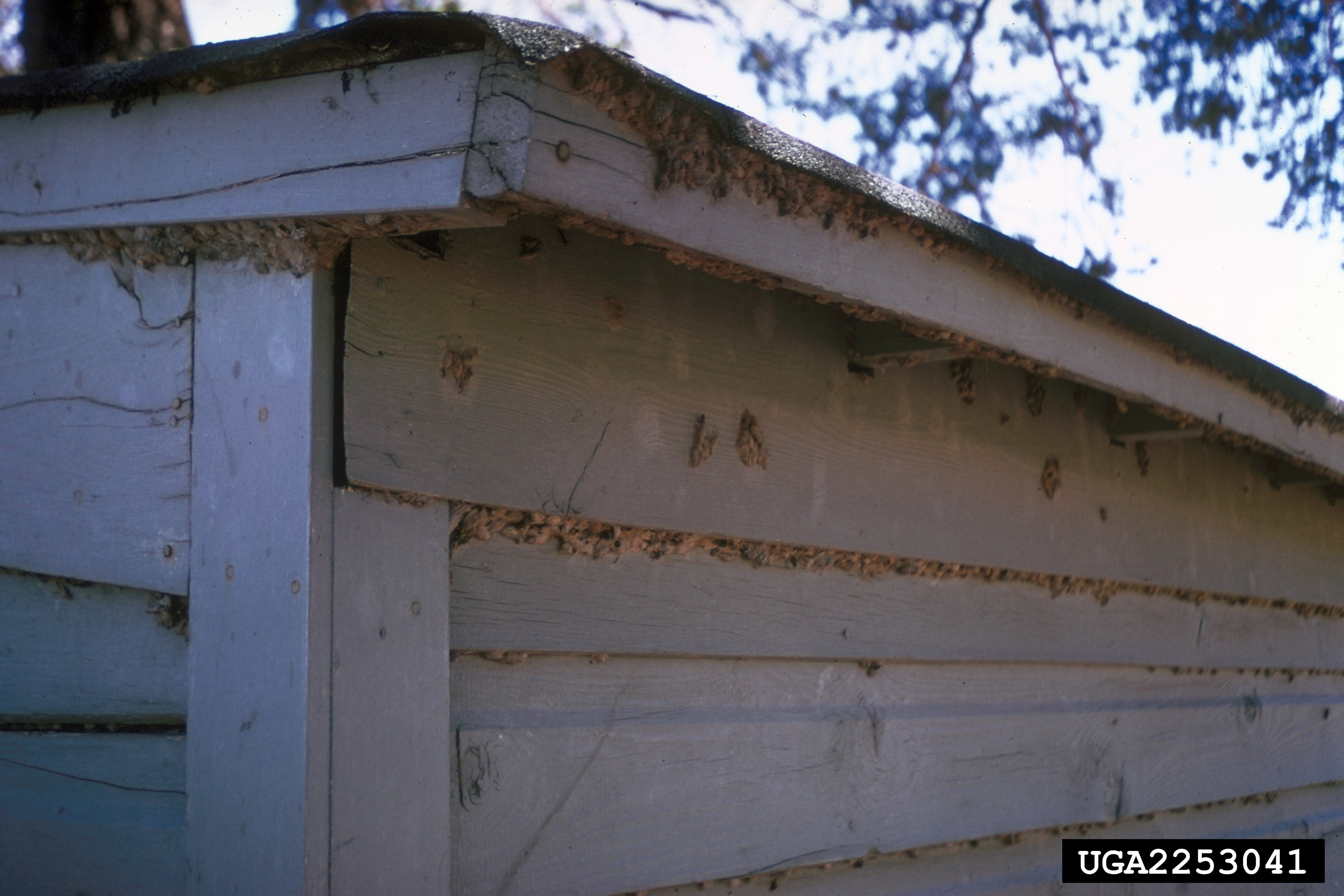
Moths emerging from pupal cases on side of building

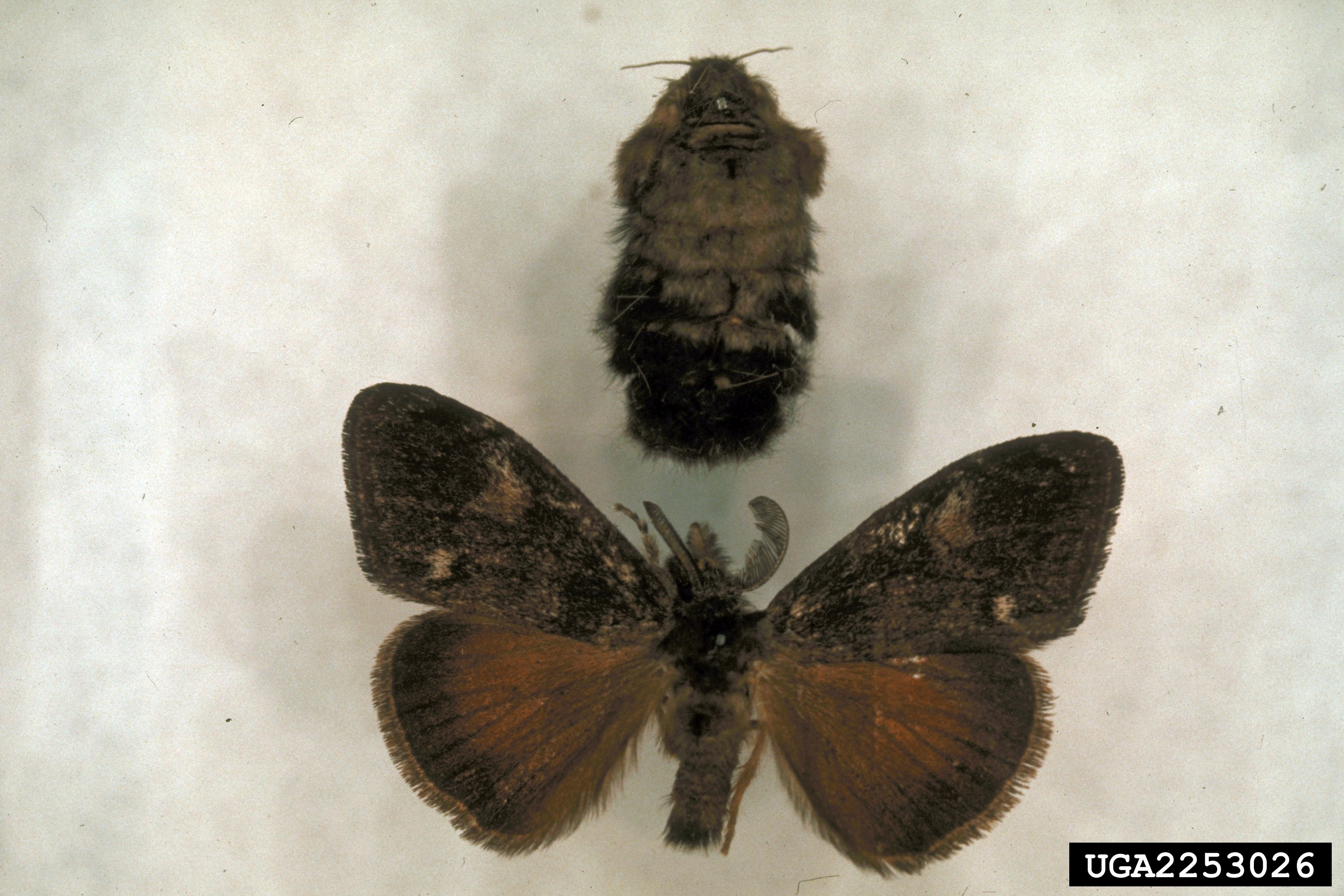
Adult female and male
