= List of lymantriid genera =

The large moth subfamily Lymantriinae contains the following genera:
