= Decelleria =

Scientific classification
- Kingdom: Animalia
- Phylum: Arthropoda
- Class: Insecta
- Order: Lepidoptera
- Superfamily: Noctuoidea
- Family: Erebidae
- Tribe: Lymantriini
- Genus: Decelleria; Dall'Asta, 1981
- Species: D. brachycera

Binomial name
- Decelleria brachycera (Collenette, 1937)

Synonyms
- Dasychira brachycera Collenette, 1937

Genus of moths

Decelleria is a monotypic moth genus in the subfamily Lymantriinae erected by Ugo Dall'Asta in 1981. Its only species, Decelleria brachycera, was first described by Cyril Leslie Collenette in 1981. It is found in the Democratic Republic of the Congo.
