= Leucoma cryptadia =

Scientific classification
- Domain: Eukaryota
- Kingdom: Animalia
- Phylum: Arthropoda
- Class: Insecta
- Order: Lepidoptera
- Superfamily: Noctuoidea
- Family: Erebidae
- Genus: Leucoma
- Species: L. cryptadia

Binomial name
- Leucoma cryptadia Collenette, 1938

Species of moth

Leucoma cryptadia is a moth of the family Erebidae first described by Cyril Leslie Collenette in 1938. It is found in Sri Lanka.

Body white with bright yellow-orange labial palps and forelegs. Palps protrude beyond the frons. Antennae are darker than the orange areas.
