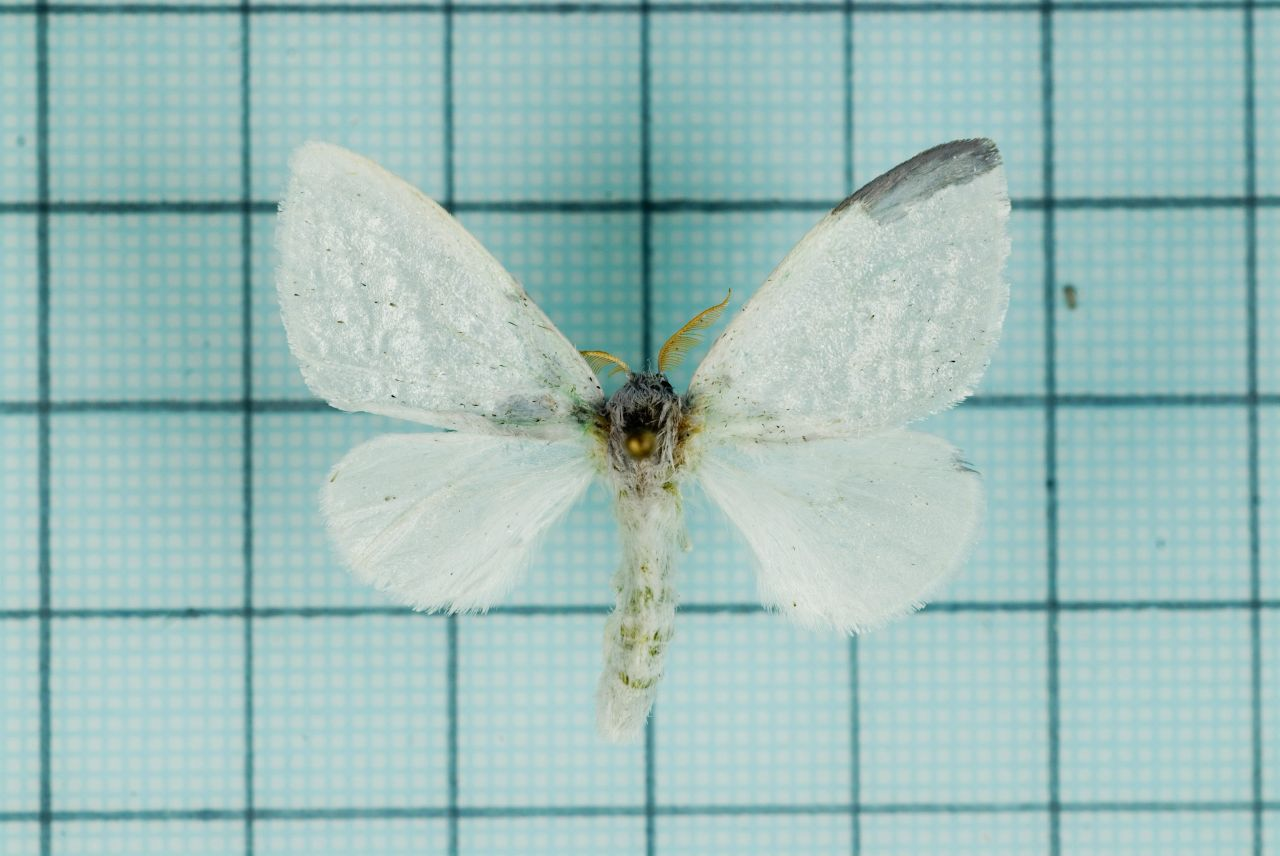

Scientific classification
- Kingdom: Animalia
- Phylum: Arthropoda
- Class: Insecta
- Order: Lepidoptera
- Superfamily: Noctuoidea
- Family: Erebidae
- Genus: Leucoma
- Species: L. clara

Binomial name
- Leucoma clara (Walker, 1865)

Synonyms
- Redoa clara Walker, 1865; Euzora clara

= Leucoma clara =

Species of moth

Leucoma clara is a moth in the family Erebidae. It is found in Taiwan and India.

The wingspan is 35–36 mm.
