= Dasychiroides =

Scientific classification
- Domain: Eukaryota
- Kingdom: Animalia
- Phylum: Arthropoda
- Class: Insecta
- Order: Lepidoptera
- Superfamily: Noctuoidea
- Family: Erebidae
- Tribe: Lymantriini
- Genus: Dasychiroides; Bethune-Baker, 1904

Genus of moths

Dasychiroides is a genus of moths in the subfamily Lymantriinae. The genus was erected by George Thomas Bethune-Baker in 1904.

== Species ==
- Dasychiroides obsoleta Bethune-Baker, 1904 New Guinea
- Dasychiroides bicolora Bethune-Baker, 1904 New Guinea
- Dasychiroides pratti Bethune-Baker, 1904 New Guinea
- Dasychiroides brunneostrigata Bethune-Baker, 1904 New Guinea
- Dasychiroides nesites Collenette, 1932 New Britain
