= Leucoma lechrisemata =

Scientific classification
- Domain: Eukaryota
- Kingdom: Animalia
- Phylum: Arthropoda
- Class: Insecta
- Order: Lepidoptera
- Superfamily: Noctuoidea
- Family: Erebidae
- Genus: Leucoma
- Species: L. lechrisemata

Binomial name
- Leucoma lechrisemata Collenette, 1959

Species of moth

Leucoma lechrisemata is a moth of the family Erebidae. It is found in north-western Madagascar.

The forewings of this species are white with an iridescent surface, the underside, hindwings and fringes are white with a dull surface. Head and body are white, the pulpus is orange.

Wingspan: male: 38 mm - female: 40–45 mm. This species has been found in altitudes between 120 and 1040 m.
