= Leucoma ochripes =

Scientific classification
- Domain: Eukaryota
- Kingdom: Animalia
- Phylum: Arthropoda
- Class: Insecta
- Order: Lepidoptera
- Superfamily: Noctuoidea
- Family: Erebidae
- Genus: Leucoma
- Species: L. ochripes

Binomial name
- Leucoma ochripes (Moore, 1879)

Synonyms
- Stilpnotia ochripes Moore, 1879; Euzora ochripes Swinhoe, 1922; Caviria ochripes Collenette, 1932

Species of moth

Leucoma ochripes is a moth in the family Erebidae first described by Frederic Moore in 1879. It is found in Darjeeling in India, the north-east Himalayas, Yunnan in China, and Borneo.

The wingspan is 42 mm and it is pure white.

== Biology ==
The larvae are polyphagous on dicotyledonous trees, known host plants are Sapium sp. (Euphorbiaceae), Litsea glutinosa and Phoebe sp. (Lauraceae).
