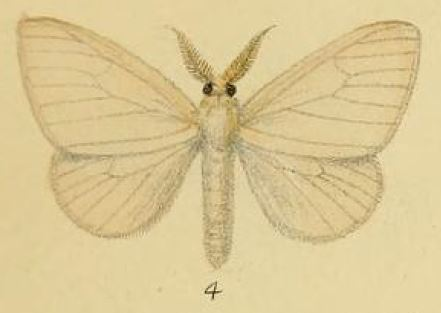

Scientific classification
- Kingdom: Animalia
- Phylum: Arthropoda
- Class: Insecta
- Order: Lepidoptera
- Superfamily: Noctuoidea
- Family: Erebidae
- Genus: Leucoma
- Species: L. luteipes

Binomial name
- Leucoma luteipes (Walker, 1855)

Synonyms
- Redoa laba Schaus, 1893; Stilpnotia luteipes Walker, 1855

= Leucoma luteipes =

Species of moth

Leucoma luteipes is a moth in the family Erebidae.

== Distribution ==
This species is found in Angola, Cameroon, Congo, Equatorial Guinea, Gabon, Nigeria and Sierra Leone.
