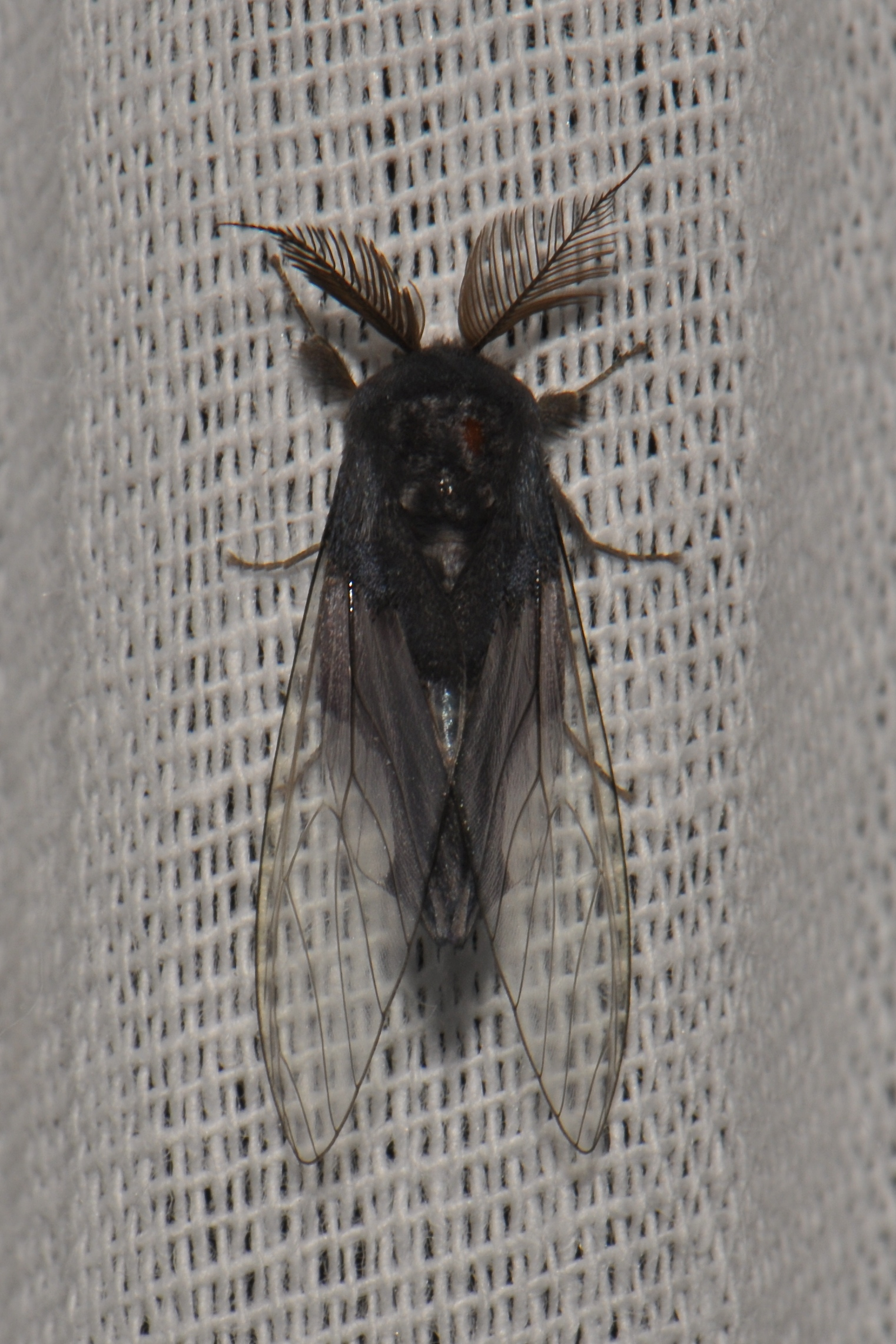
- Male

Scientific classification
- Kingdom: Animalia
- Phylum: Arthropoda
- Clade: Pancrustacea
- Class: Insecta
- Order: Lepidoptera
- Superfamily: Noctuoidea
- Family: Erebidae
- Genus: Perina
- Species: P. nuda

Binomial name
- Perina nuda Fabricius, 1787

Synonyms
- Bombyx nuda Fabricius, 1787; Stilpnotia subtinca Walker, 1855; Perina basalis Walker, 1855; Euproctis combinata Walker, 1865; Perina pura Walker, 1869; Acanthopsyche ritsemae Heylaerts, 1881; Perina basalis Moore, 1878; Perina pura Swinhoe, 1923

= Perina nuda =

Clearwing tussock moth

Species of moth

Perina nuda, the clearwing tussock moth or banyan tussock moth, is a moth of the family Erebidae. The species was first described by Johan Christian Fabricius in 1787. It is found in the Indian subregion, Sri Lanka, southern China, Hong Kong, Thailand and Sundaland.

== Description ==
Adults show striking sexual dimorphism. The caterpillar has a greyish head and flanks, with the broad black dorsum. Its setae are white. The pupa is bristly, piebald in dark grey and cream. The setae on each pupa is orange. The caterpillar is a minor pest on several banyan species such as Ficus benjamina, Ficus benghalensis, Ficus racemosa, Ficus pumila and Ficus religiosa, and also many crop plants like Artocarpus and Mangifera.

The species is associated with an RNA virus called Perina nuda virus.

== Images ==
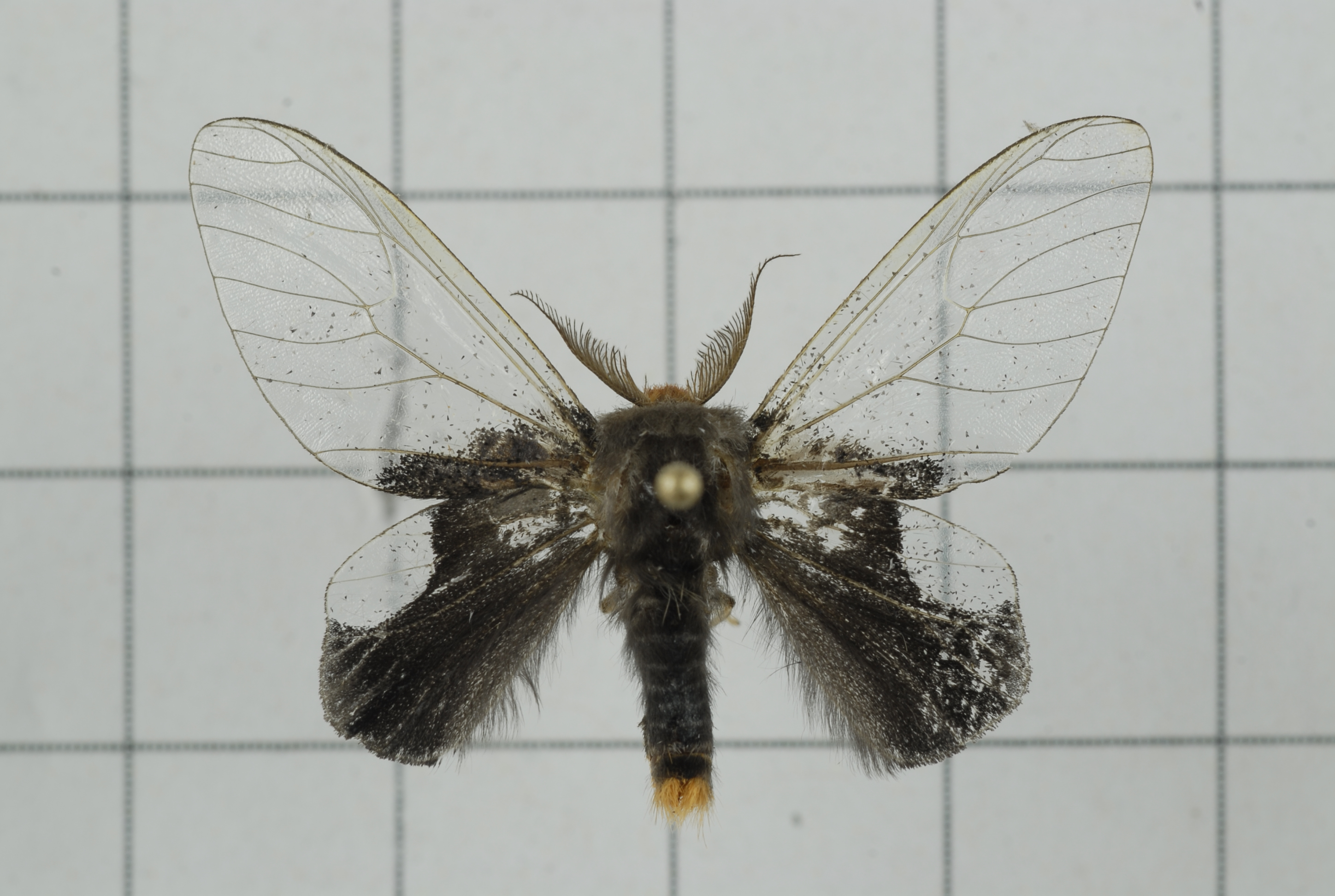
Male dorsal surface

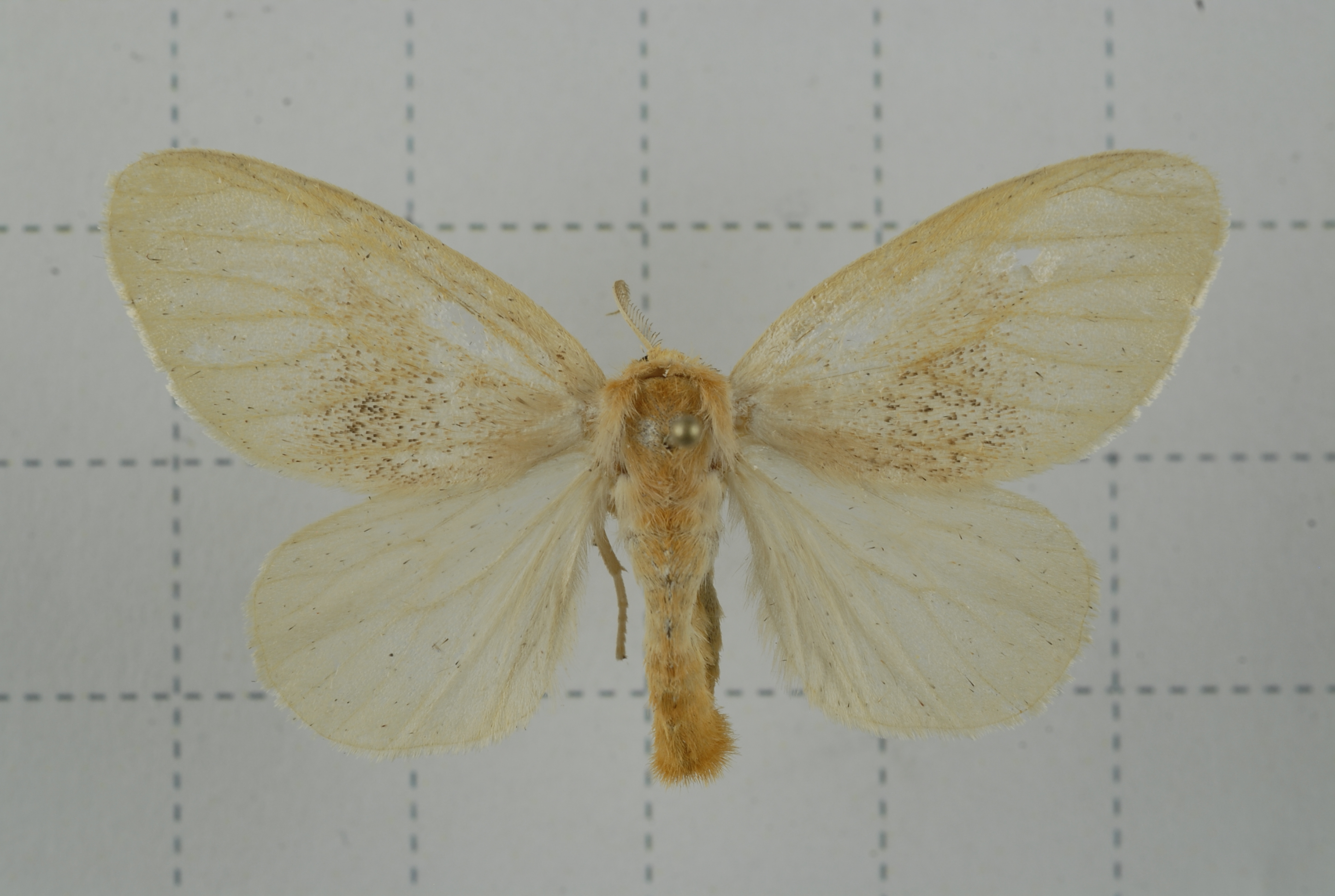
Female dorsal surface

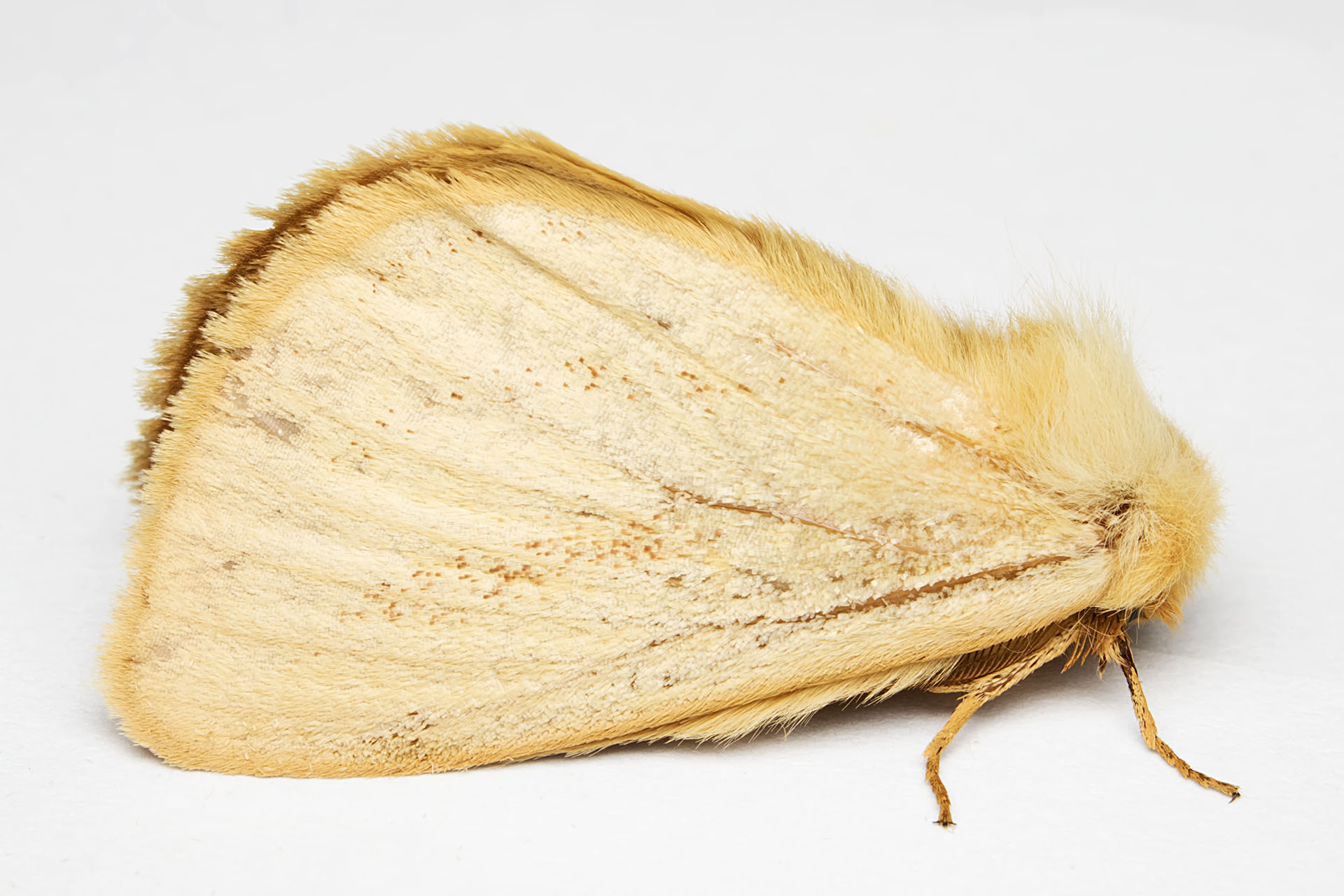
Live moth in side angle

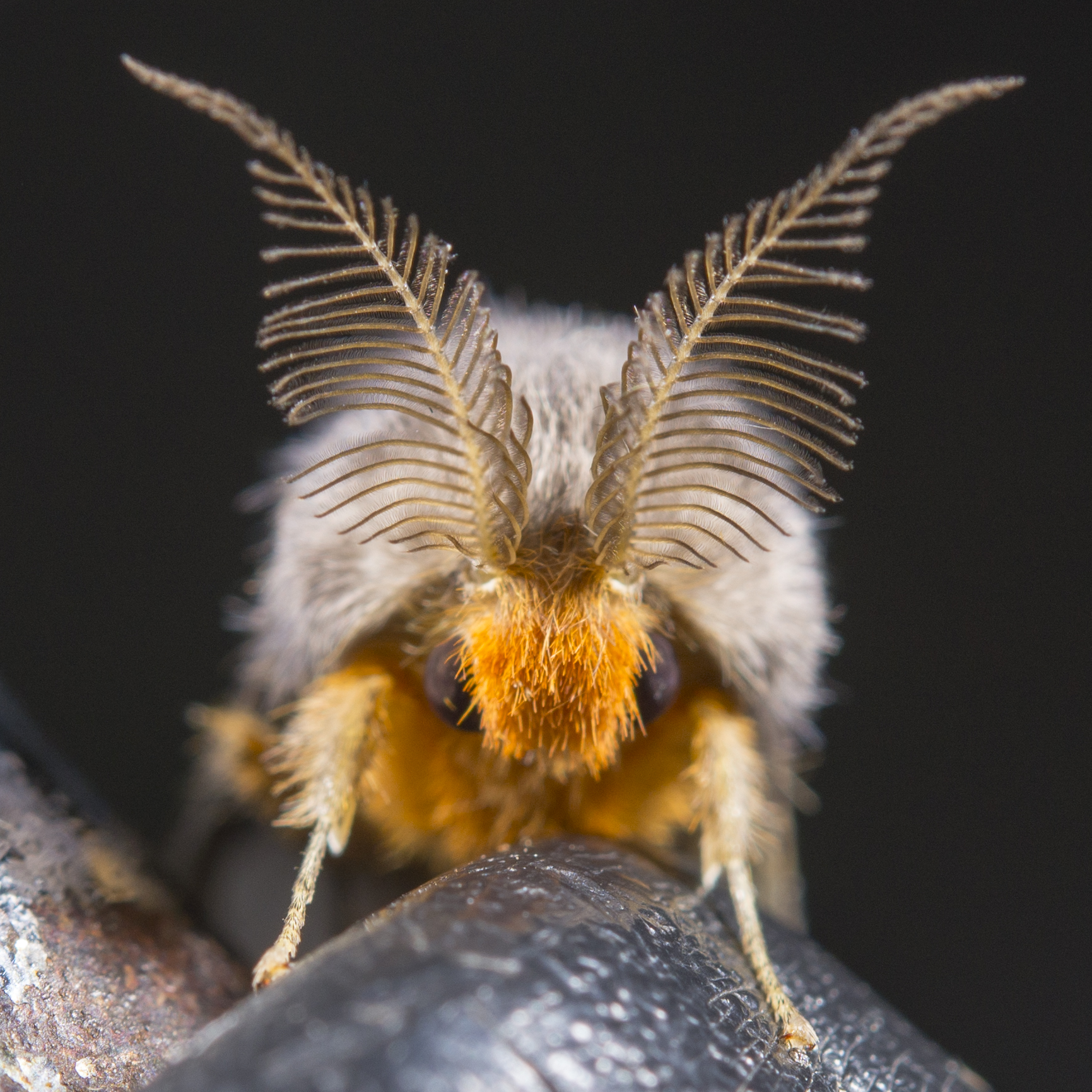
Antennae of male

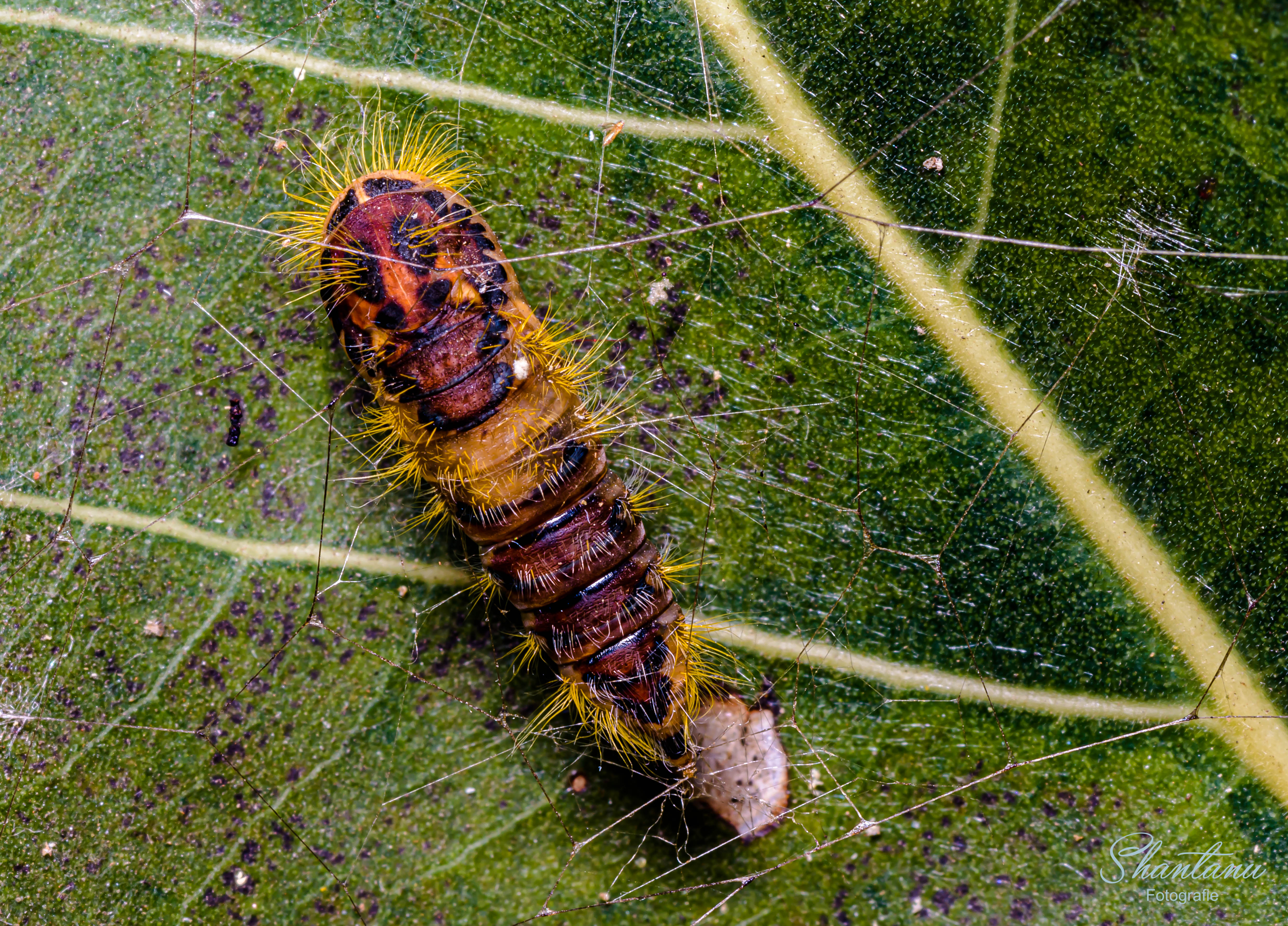
Pupa

== Research articles ==
- The complete genome sequence of Perina nuda picorna-like virus, an insect-infecting RNA virus with a genome organization similar to that of the mammalian picornaviruses.
- Perina nuda virus
- Life history of the Perina nuda (Fabricius) and virus production of the infected pupae
- Continuous Cell line from Pupal Ovary of Perina nuda (Lepidoptera: Lymantriidae) That Is Permissive to Nuclear Polyhedrosis Virus from P. nuda
- A Perina nuda cell line (NTU-Pn-HF) from pupal ovary that is persistently infected with a picorna-like virus (PnPV)
- Characterization of a multiple-nucleocapsid nucleopolyhedrovirus isolated from Perina nuda (Fabricius) (Lepidoptera: Lymantriidae) larvae
- The 5′ untranslated region of Perina nuda virus (PnV) possesses a strong internal translation activity in baculovirus-infected insect cells
