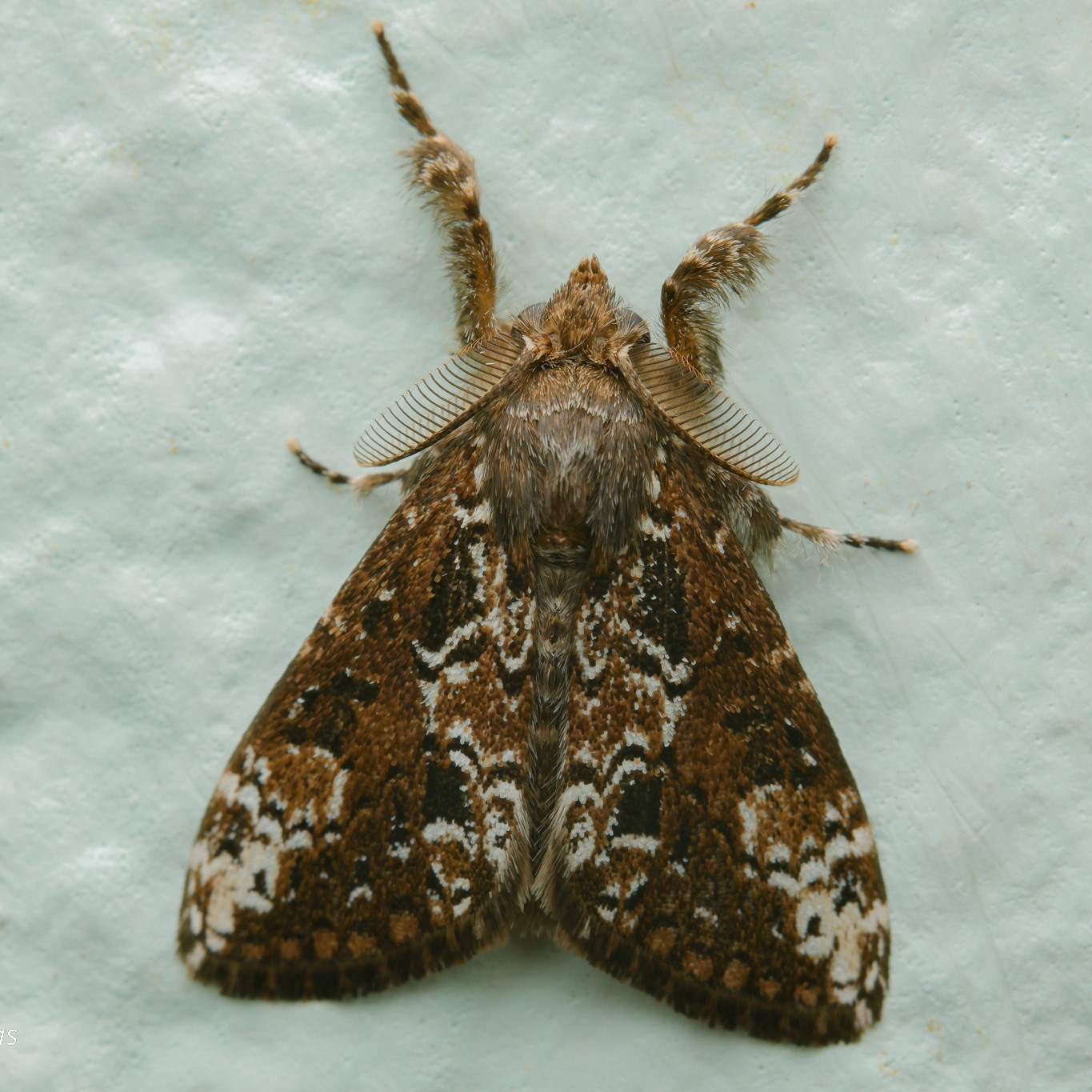
- Zavana acroleuca

Scientific classification
- Kingdom: Animalia
- Phylum: Arthropoda
- Clade: Pancrustacea
- Class: Insecta
- Order: Lepidoptera
- Superfamily: Noctuoidea
- Family: Erebidae
- Tribe: Lymantriini
- Genus: Zavana; Griveaud, 1976

= Zavana =

Genus of moths

Zavana is a genus of moths in the subfamily Lymantriinae erected by Paul Griveaud in 1976. They are found on Madagascar.

== Species ==
Some species of this genus are:

- Zavana acroleuca (Hering, 1926) – type species
- Zavana iodnephes (Collenette, 1936)
