= Dasychoproctis =

Scientific classification
- Domain: Eukaryota
- Kingdom: Animalia
- Phylum: Arthropoda
- Class: Insecta
- Order: Lepidoptera
- Superfamily: Noctuoidea
- Family: Erebidae
- Tribe: Lymantriini
- Genus: Dasychoproctis; Hering, 1926

Genus of moths

Dasychoproctis is a genus of moths in the subfamily Lymantriinae. The genus was described by Hering in 1926. Both species are found on Madagascar.

== Species ==
- Dasychoproctis dubiosa Hering, 1926
- Dasychoproctis lasioma Collenette, 1959
