= Dyasma =

Scientific classification
- Domain: Eukaryota
- Kingdom: Animalia
- Phylum: Arthropoda
- Class: Insecta
- Order: Lepidoptera
- Superfamily: Noctuoidea
- Family: Erebidae
- Tribe: Lymantriini
- Genus: Dyasma; Collenette, 1961
- Species: D. thaumatopoeides

Binomial name
- Dyasma thaumatopoeides (Schultze, 1934)

Synonyms
- Dasychira thaumatopoeides Schultze, 1934

Genus of moths

Dyasma is a monotypic moth genus in the subfamily Lymantriinae erected by Cyril Leslie Collenette in 1961. Its only species, Dyasma thaumatopoeides, was first described by Schultze in 1934. It is found in the Central African Republic and Uganda.
