= Leucoma nigrolineata =

Scientific classification
- Domain: Eukaryota
- Kingdom: Animalia
- Phylum: Arthropoda
- Class: Insecta
- Order: Lepidoptera
- Superfamily: Noctuoidea
- Family: Erebidae
- Genus: Leucoma
- Species: L. nigrolineata

Binomial name
- Leucoma nigrolineata Bethune-Baker, 1927

Species of moth

Leucoma nigrolineata is a moth of the family Erebidae. It is found in Cameroon and the Democratic Republic of Congo (Orientale, East Kasai).

The wingspan is about 57 mm. Both wings are pure white, the forewings with a waved black line in the fold from the base to the termen. Veins four, six, seven and the short branch of vein eight are outlined with black. The costa is black. The hindwings have a very short dark dash at the end of veins four and seven, and a black dot at the end of vein six.
