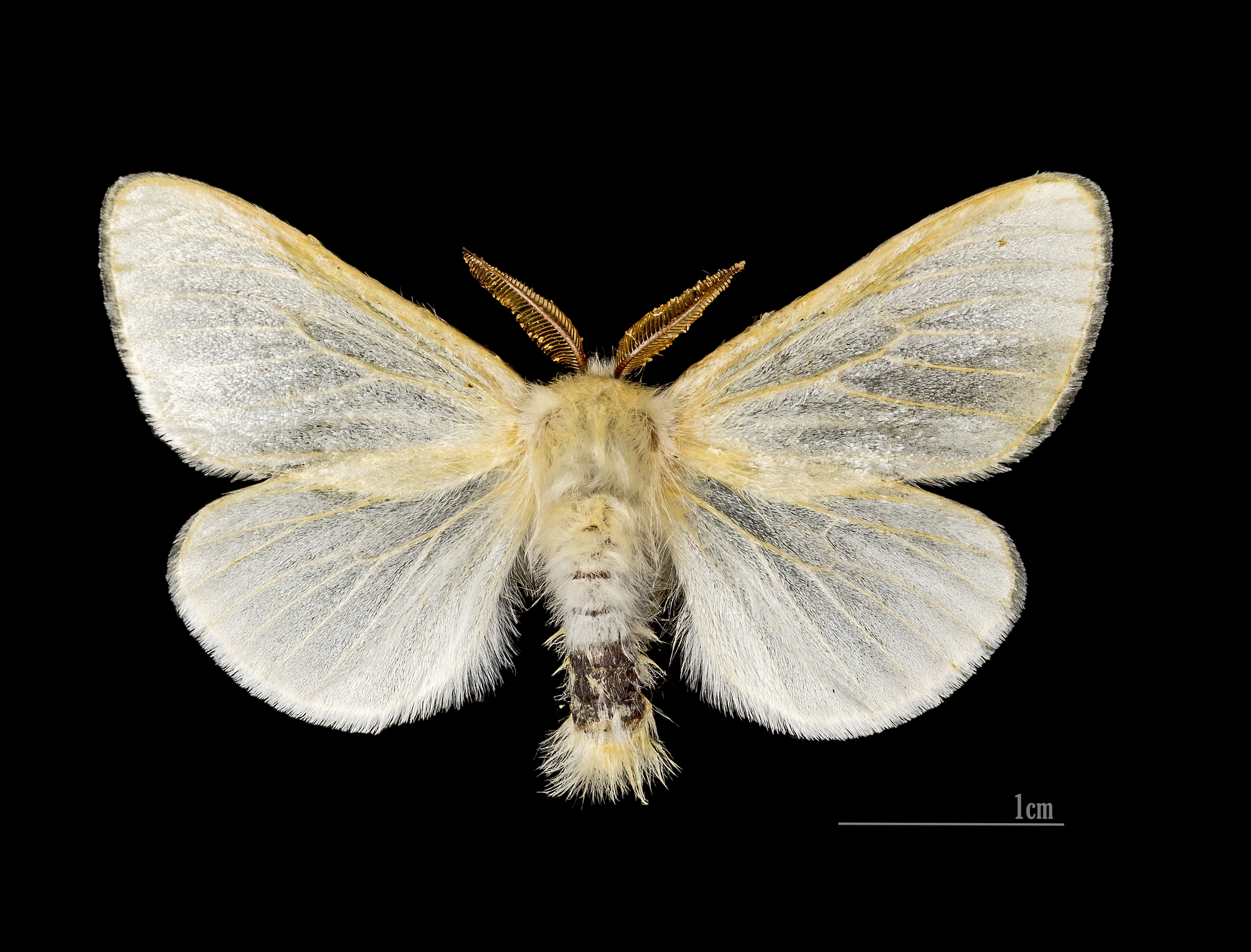
- Leucoma salicis

Scientific classification
- Kingdom: Animalia
- Phylum: Arthropoda
- Class: Insecta
- Order: Lepidoptera
- Superfamily: Noctuoidea
- Family: Erebidae
- Subfamily: Lymantriinae
- Tribe: Leucomini; Grote, 1895

= Leucomini =

Tribe of moths

The Leucomini are a tribe of tussock moths of the family Erebidae.

== Description ==
Moths of this tribe typically have a red color on the underside of the head and thorax and on the legs and have asymmetric genitalia.

== Genera ==
The tribe includes the following genera:

- Ivela
- Leucoma
- Perina
