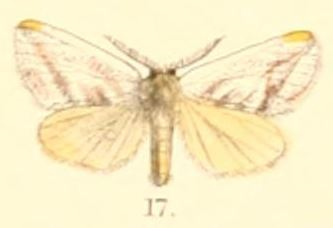
- Daplasa irrorata

Scientific classification
- Kingdom: Animalia
- Phylum: Arthropoda
- Clade: Pancrustacea
- Class: Insecta
- Order: Lepidoptera
- Superfamily: Noctuoidea
- Family: Erebidae
- Subfamily: Lymantriinae
- Tribe: Daplasini; Holloway & Wang, 2015
- Genus: Daplasa; Moore, 1879

= Daplasa =

Genus of moths

Daplasa is a genus of moths in the subfamily Lymantriinae of the family Erebidae erected by Frederic Moore in 1879. It is the sole member of the tribe Daplasini erected Jeremy Daniel Holloway and Houshuai Wang in 2015.

== Species ==
- Daplasa albolyclene Holloway, 1999 Borneo
- Daplasa blacklinea Chao, 1985 China (Guangdong, Sichuan, Hainan)
- Daplasa irrorata Moore, 1879 Tibet, Darjeeling, Bengal, China (Fujian, Jiangxi, Hubei, Hunan, Guangdong, Guangxi, Hainan, Sichuan, Yunnan)
- Daplasa lyclene (Swinhoe, 1904) Borneo, ?Sumatra
- Daplasa melanoma (Collenette, 1938) N.Yunnan, Sichuan
- Daplasa nivisala Pang, Rindos, Kishida & Wang, 2019 China (Yunnan)
- Daplasa postincisa (Moore, 1879) Bengal
- Daplasa variegata (Moore, 1879) Darjeeling, Nepal
