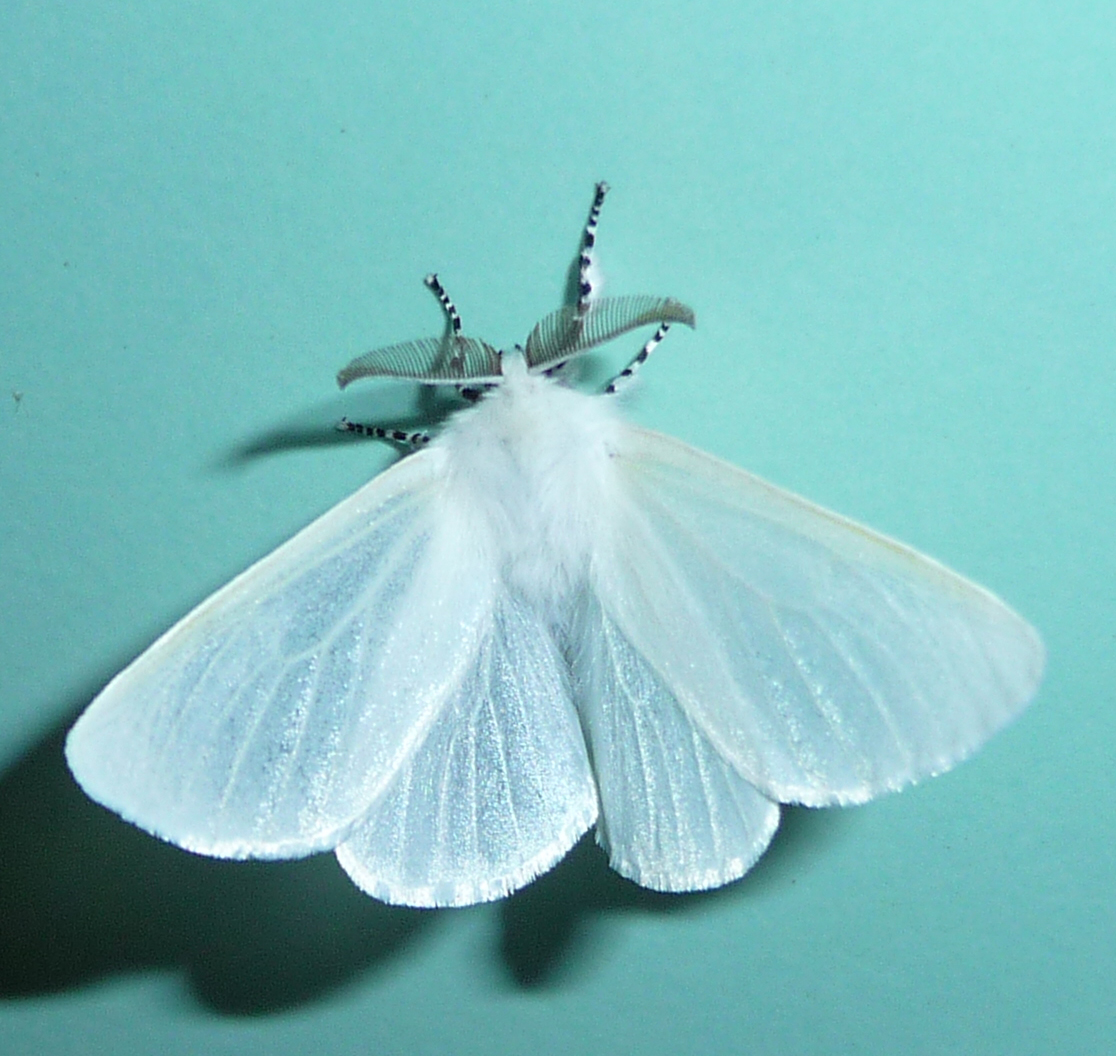

Scientific classification
- Kingdom: Animalia
- Phylum: Arthropoda
- Clade: Pancrustacea
- Class: Insecta
- Order: Lepidoptera
- Superfamily: Noctuoidea
- Family: Erebidae
- Genus: Leucoma
- Species: L. salicis

Binomial name
- Leucoma salicis (Linnaeus, 1758)

= Leucoma salicis =

Species of moth

Leucoma salicis, also known as the white satin moth or satin moth, is a moth of the family Erebidae. The species was first described by Carl Linnaeus in his 10th edition of Systema Naturae from 1758. It is found in Europe including the British Isles excluding the far north. In the east it is found across the Palearctic to Japan. The species was introduced to North America in the 1920s.

== Technical description and variation ==
Leucoma salicis has a wingspan of 37–50 mm. White, sometimes with black spots. The head and collar as well as the pectinations of the antennae are black. Tibiae and tarsi with broad black rings. The East-Asiatic species Leucoma candida (Staudinger, 1892) with different male genitalia structure, has much purer glossy white and entirely opaque, more thickly scaled, wings and is on the whole smaller, with narrower wings. From central and eastern Siberia, Mongolia, Amurland, Korea, China and Japan. Yellowish-grey specimens are ab. sohesti Capr. Specimens from Tian-shan with black pectinations of the antennae of the male are nigripennata Staudinger. ab. nigrociliata Fuchs has sharp black third of the costal margin and glossy black fringes; Germany, ab. rubicunda Strand has both the and hairy covering reddish, almost rose red at the costal and inner margins of the forewing (male); in southern Norway. Distribution of Leucoma salicis occupies most part of Eurasia south from the Polar Circle, excluding north-eastern Siberia.

== Life and habitat ==
Leucoma salicis eggs are usually laid on tree trunks in clusters covered with a paper-like substance. Larvae are black with a row of light dorsal spots and a yellow lateral line. Segments four and five have a pair of fleshy pointed tubercles. The larvae feed on Salix and Populus species. Pupation takes place in a loose cocoon between leaves. The pupa is glossy black with white spots and yellow tufts. Leucoma salicis is generally active in June, July and August. The males begin to fly shortly before dusk.

Leucoma salicis prefers damp locations, such as forest edges and hedges, as well as alleys, parks and gardens in urban areas.

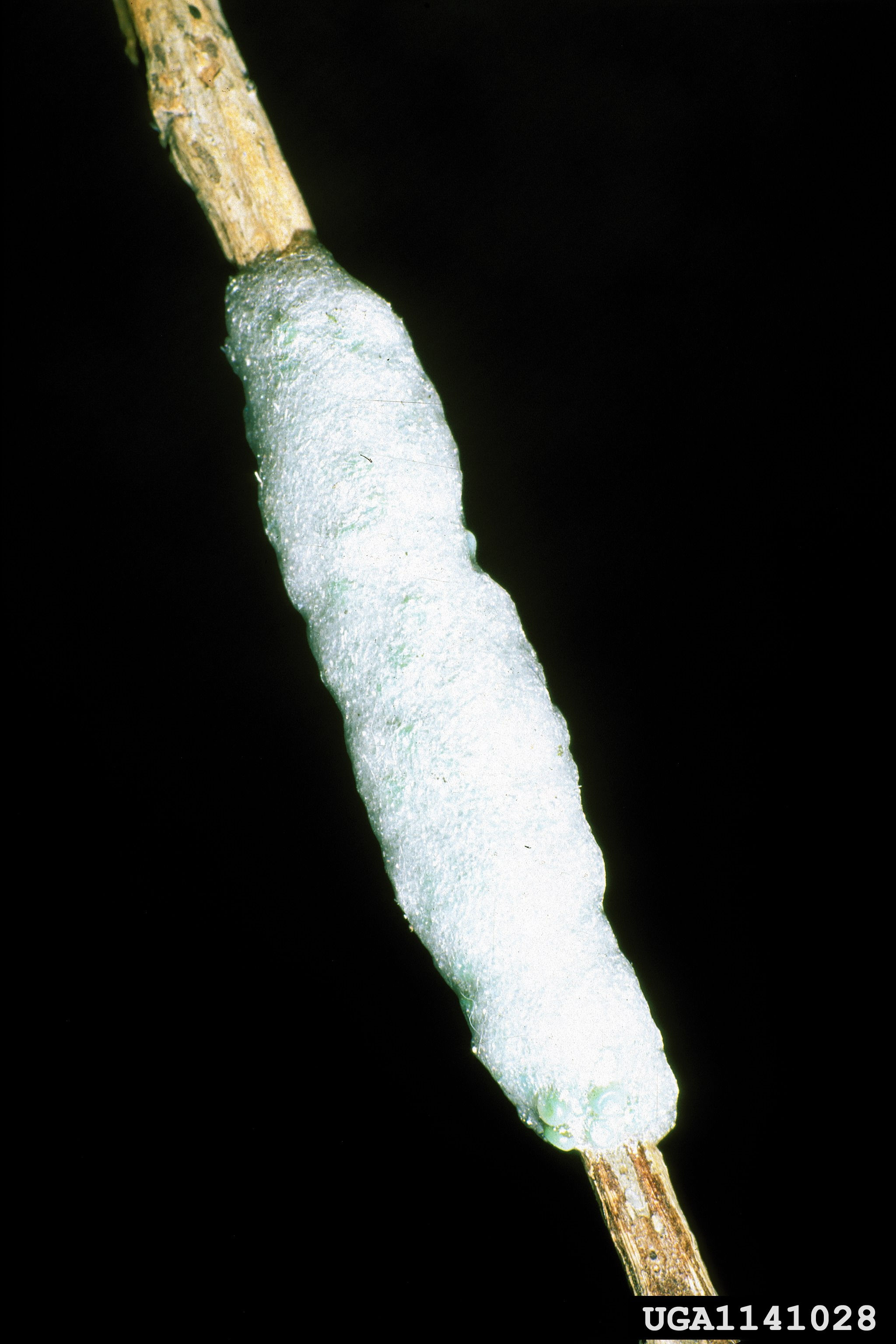
Eggs

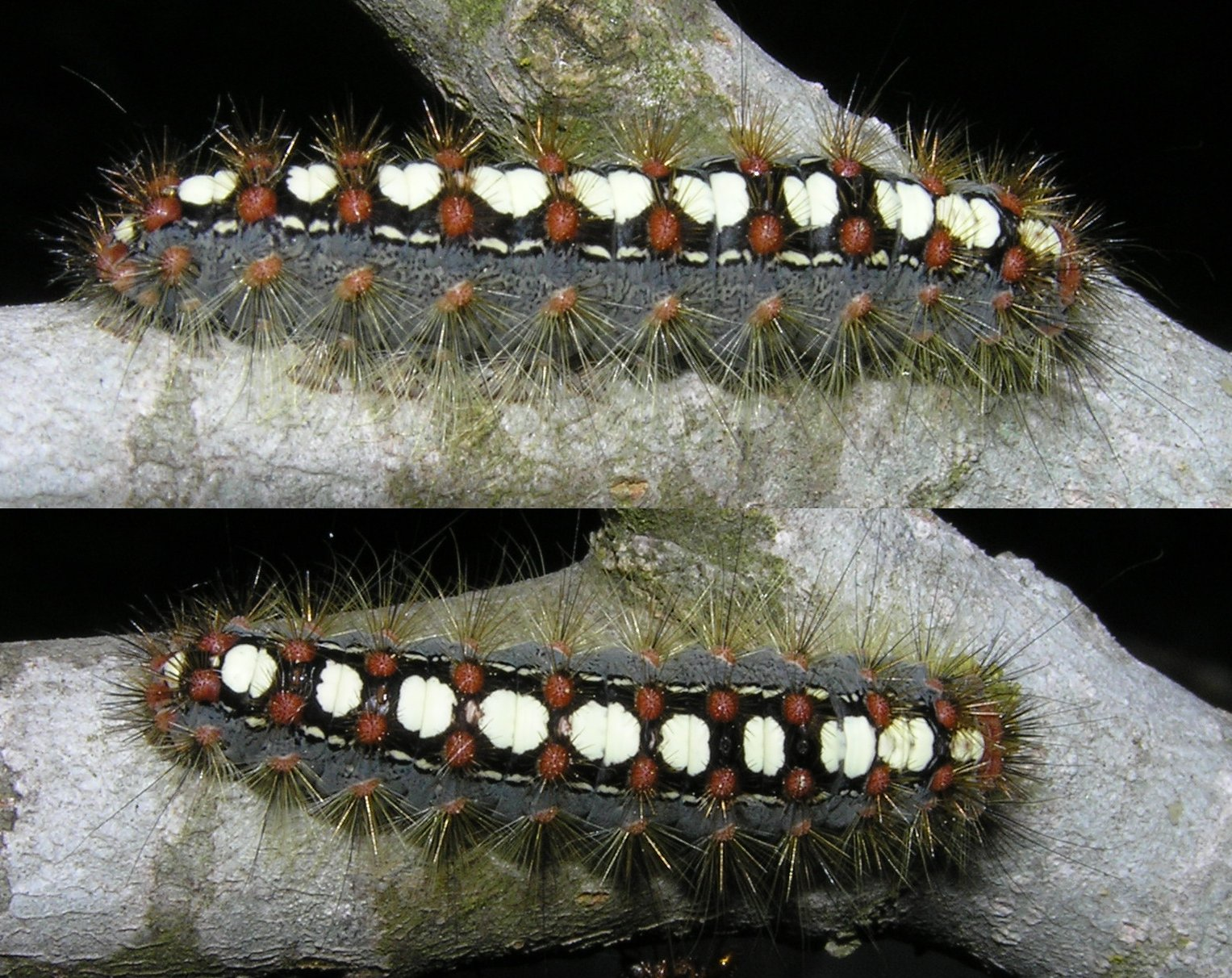
Caterpillar
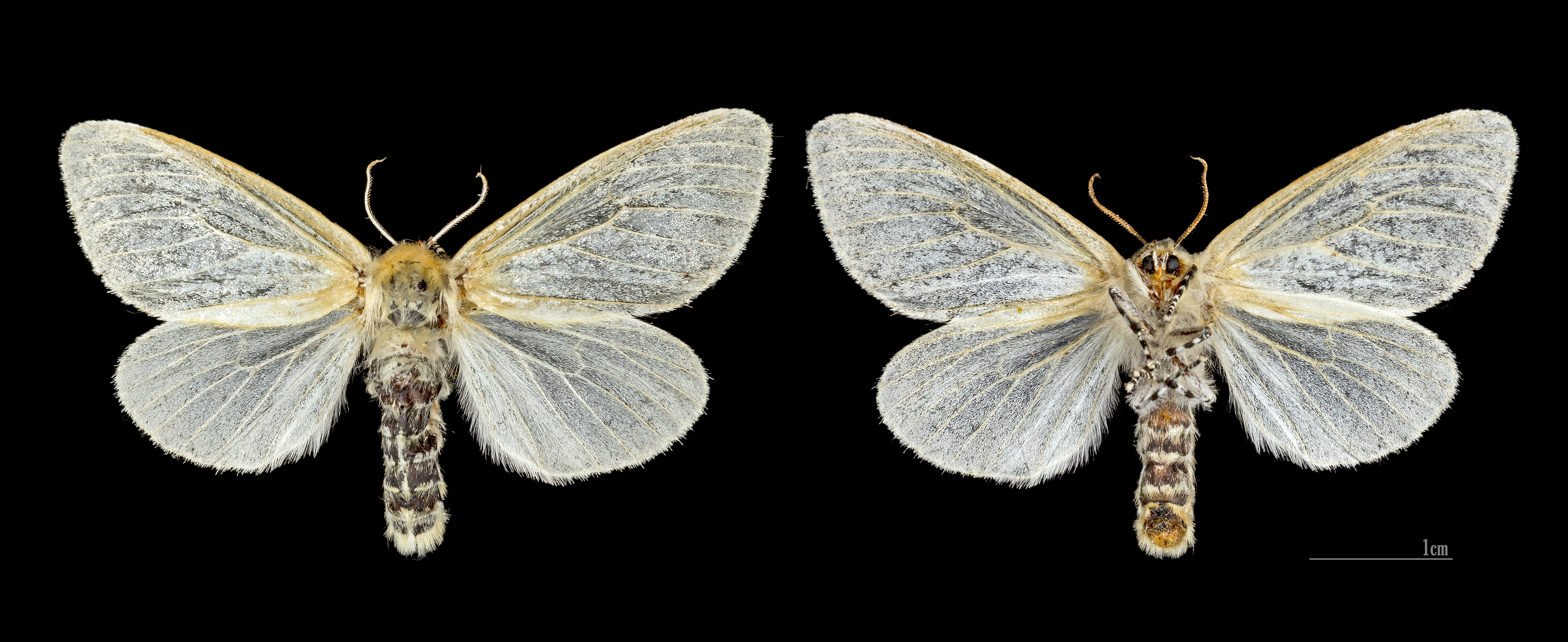
Female

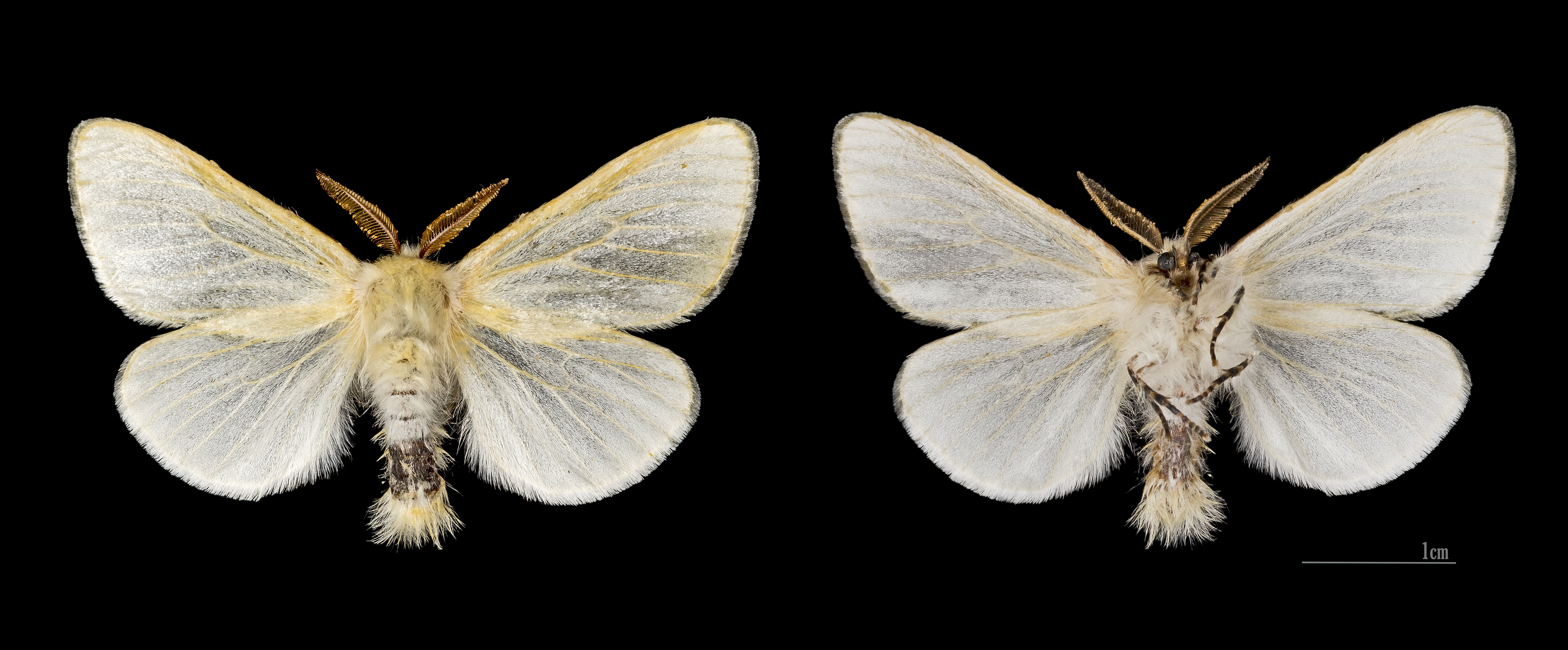
Male
