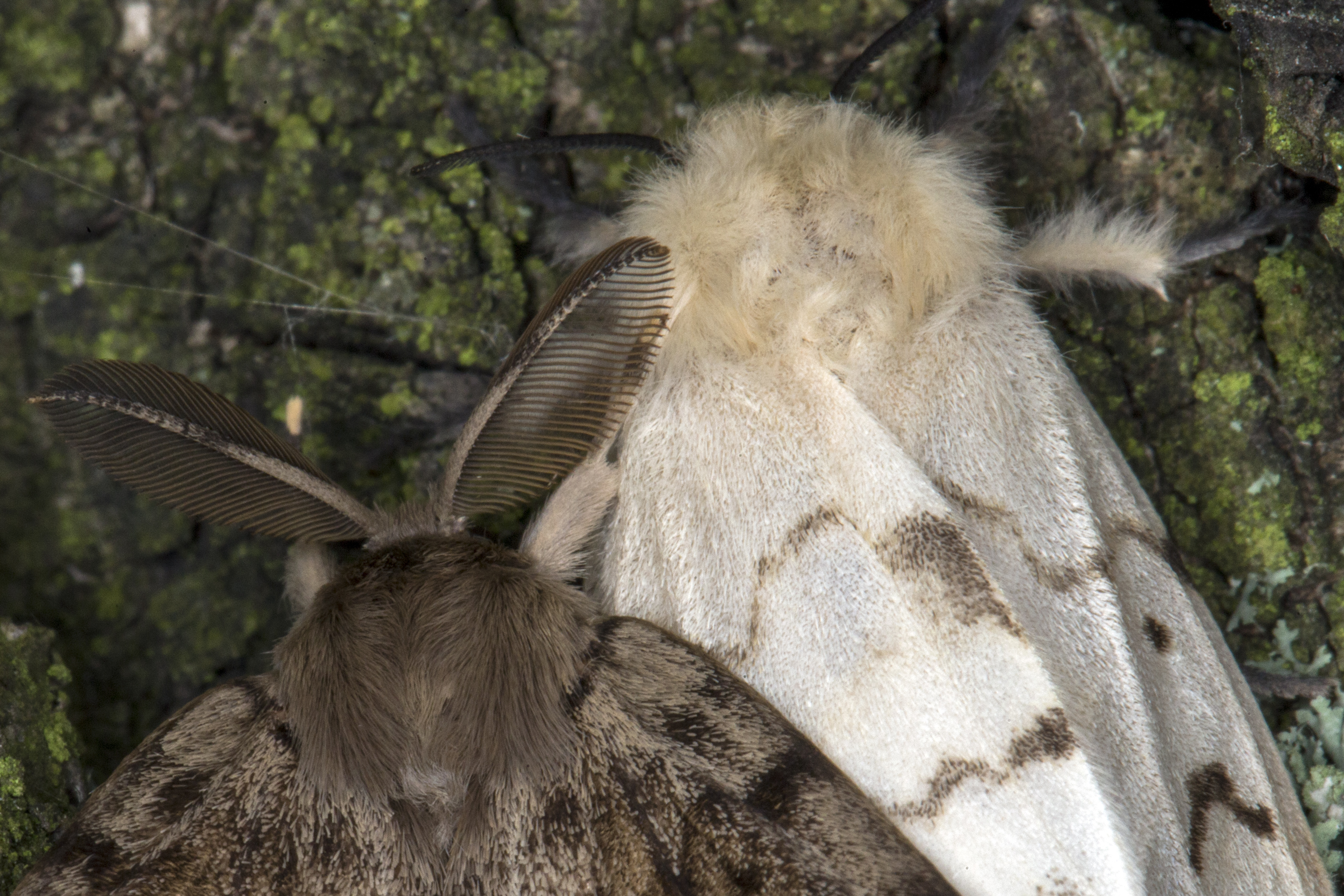
- Male (left) and female (right) Lymantria dispar

Scientific classification
- Kingdom: Animalia
- Phylum: Arthropoda
- Clade: Pancrustacea
- Class: Insecta
- Order: Lepidoptera
- Superfamily: Noctuoidea
- Family: Erebidae
- Subfamily: Lymantriinae; Hampson, 1893

Diversity
- About 350 genera, 2,500–2,700+ species

Synonyms
- Lymantriidae Hampson, 1893

= Lymantriinae =

Subfamily of moths

The Lymantriinae (formerly called the Lymantriidae) are a subfamily of moths of the family Erebidae. The taxon was erected by George Hampson in 1893.

Many of its component species are referred to as "tussock moths" of one sort or another. The caterpillar, or larval, stage of these species often has a distinctive appearance of alternating bristles and haired projections. Many tussock moth caterpillars have urticating hairs (often hidden among longer, softer hairs), which can cause painful reactions if they come into contact with skin.

View of a Tussock Moth caterpillar at Belapur in Navi Mumbai.

The subfamily Lymantriinae includes about 350 known genera and over 2,500 known species found in every continent except Antarctica. They are particularly concentrated in sub-Saharan Africa, India, Southeast Asia, and South America. One estimate lists 258 species in Madagascar alone. Apart from oceanic islands, notable places that do not host lymantriines include the Antilles and New Caledonia.

== Description ==
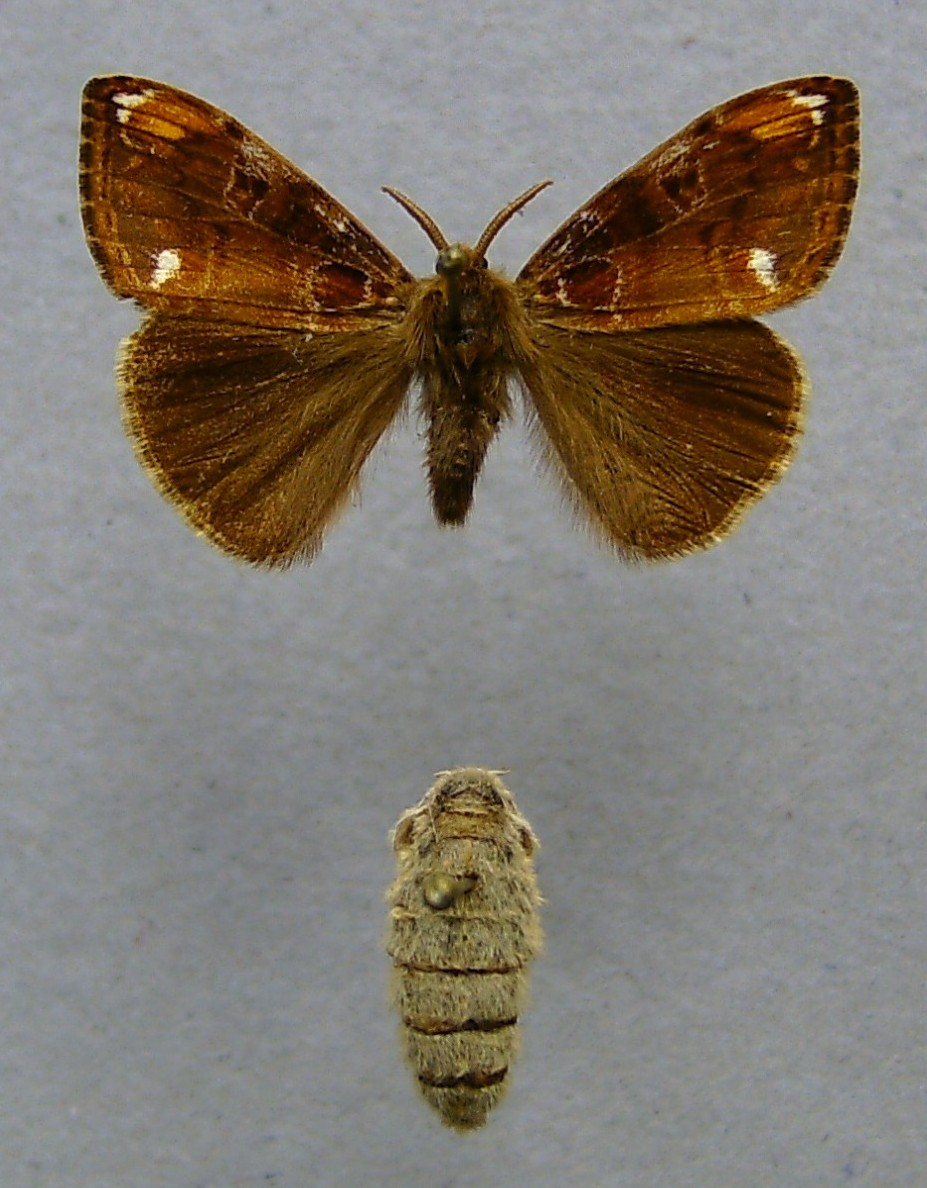
The different forms of the male (top) and female (bottom) tussock moth Orgyia recens is an example of sexual dimorphism in insects.

Adult moths of this subfamily do not feed. They usually have muted colours (browns and greys), although some are white, and tend to be very hairy. Some females are flightless, and some have reduced wings. Usually, the females have a large tuft at the end of the abdomen. The males, at least, have tympanal organs. They are mostly nocturnal, but Schaefer lists 20 confirmed diurnal species and 20 more likely diurnal species (based on reduced eye size).

The larvae are also hairy, often with hairs packed in tufts, and in many species the hairs break off very easily and are extremely irritating to the skin (especially members of the genus Euproctis). This highly effective defence serves the moth throughout its life cycle. The hairs are incorporated into the cocoon. An emerging adult female of some species collects and stores the hairs at the tip of the abdomen and uses them to camouflage and protect the eggs as they are laid. In other species, the eggs are covered by a froth that soon hardens or are camouflaged by material the female collects and sticks to them. In the larvae of some species, hairs are gathered in dense tufts along the back and this gives them the common name of tussocks or tussock moths.

Lymantria means "destroyer", and several species are important defoliators of forest trees, including the spongy moth Lymantria dispar, the Douglas-fir tussock moth Orgyia pseudotsugata, and the nun moth Lymantria monacha. They tend to have broader host plant ranges than most Lepidoptera. Most feed on trees and shrubs, but some are known from vines, herbs, grasses, and lichens.

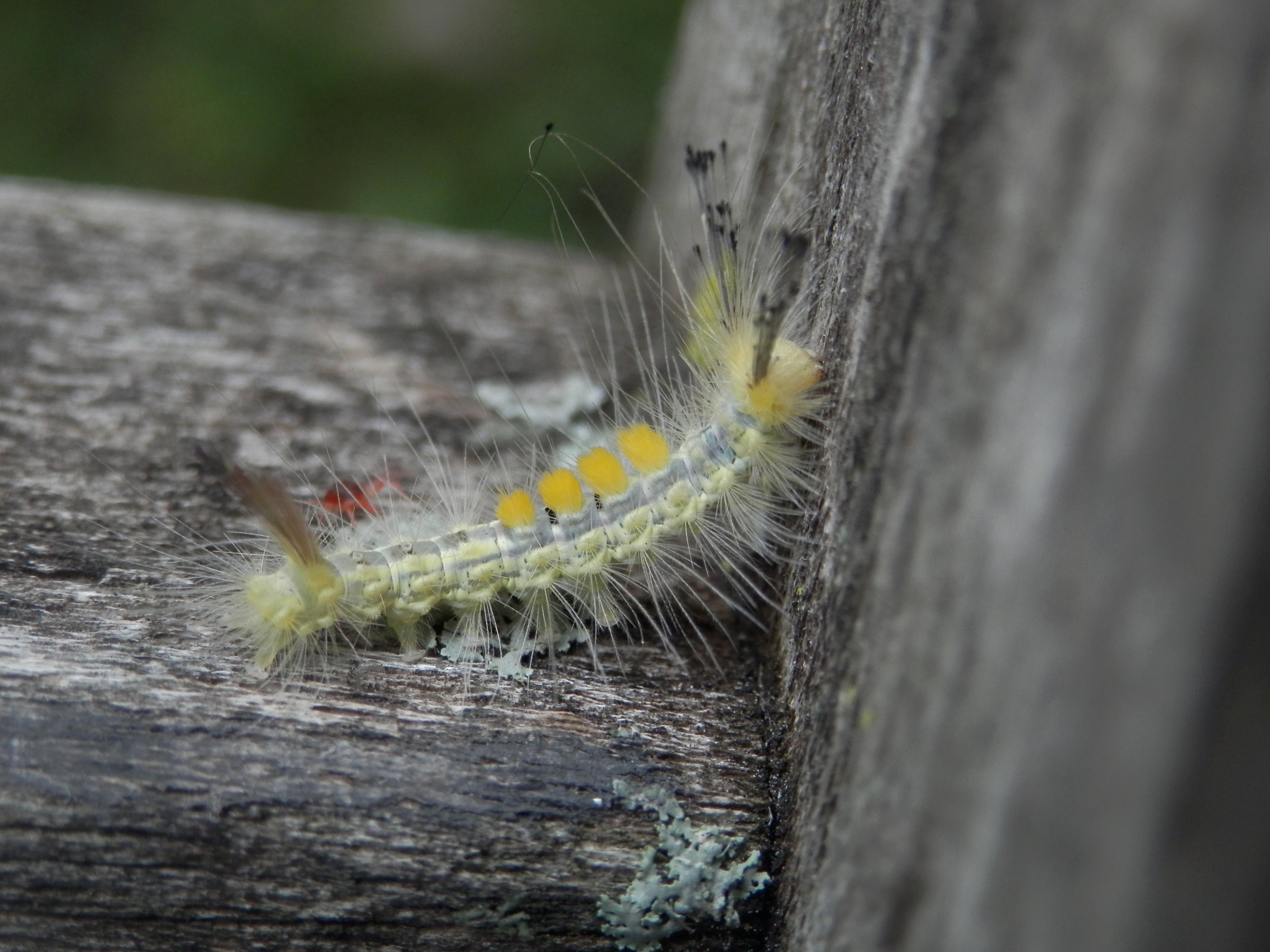
Larva of a species of tussock moth, Lymantriinae, Orgyia definita

== Tribes ==
Most genera are classified into the following tribes, while others remain unclassified (incertae sedis):

- Arctornithini
- Daplasini
- Leucomini
- Locharnini
- Lymantriini
- Orgyiini
- Nygmiini
- Incertae sedis

See also the list of Lymantriinae genera.

== Systematics ==
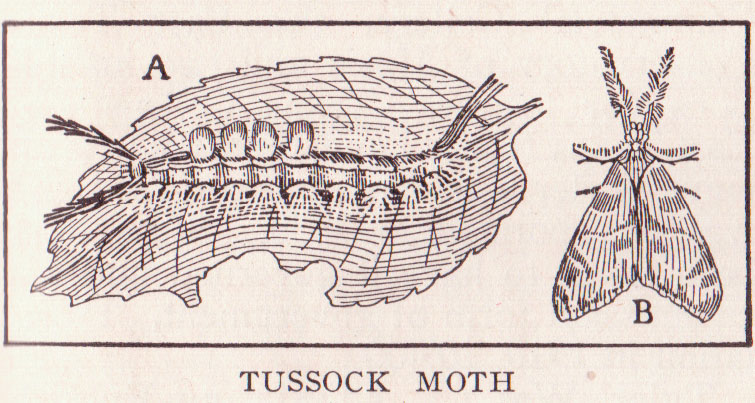
Illustration of tussock moth (1917)

Taxonomy is a dynamic discipline, and recent phylogenetic studies have reclassified the family Lymantriidae as the subfamily Lymantriinae of the newly formed family Erebidae. The studies found that the family Lymantriidae form a specialized lineage within the Erebidae and is part of a clade that includes the litter moths (Herminiinae), the Aganainae, and the tiger and lichen moths (Arctiinae). The reclassification affected the former family as a whole and largely kept the clade intact.

This description clarifies the standing of the former name "Lymantriidae" relative to other proposed names, e.g. Liparidae and other currently unacceptable alternatives. It authoritatively explains the status of the family name Lymantriidae and its various alternatives as matters stood towards the end of the 20th century:

In the 1980 The Generic Names of Moths of the World: Volume 2, Allen Watson, D. S. Fletcher and I. W. B. Nye wrote:

Lymantriidae Hampson, [1893], Fauna Br. India (Moths) 1: 432. This family was first separated under the name Lariidae Newman, 1832, Sphinx vespiformis; an essay: 40, 44 (as Lariae), based on the nominal genus Laria Schrank, 1802, a junior homonym of Laria Scopoli, 1763. The next name established for this family was Liparidae Boisduval, 1834, Icon. hist. Lèpid. nouv. ou peu connus 2: 134 (as Liparides), based on the nominal genus Liparis Ochsenheimer, 1810, a junior homonym of Liparis Scopoli, 1777. Neither of these family-group names may be used as a valid name, the type-genus in each case being a junior homonym.

These names have also been established for the family:

(a) Orgyiidae Wallengren, 1861, K. svenska Fregatten Eugenies Resa ... C.A. Virgin aren 1851-1853 (Zool.) 1 (10, Lepidoptera): 369 (as Orgyides), based on the nominal genus Orgyia Ochsenheimer, 1810;
(b) Dasychiridae Packard, 1864, Proc. ent. Soc. Philad. 3: 331 (as Dasychirae), based on the nominal genus Dasychira Hübner, [1809];
(c) Lymantriidae Hampson, [1893], Fauna Br. India (Moths) 1: 432, based on the nominal genus Lymantria Hübner, [1819];
(d) Leucomidae Grote, 1895, Mitt. Roemermus. Hildesh. 1: 3, based on the nominal genus Leucoma Hübner, 1822;
(e) Ocneriidae Meyrick, 1895, Handbk Br. Lepid.: 169 (as Ocneriadae), based on the nominal genus Ocneria Hübner, [1819];
(f) Hypogymnidae Grote, 1896, Mitt Roemermus. Hildesh. 7: 3, based on the nominal genus Hypogymna Billberg, 1820.

Of the family-group names listed in the last paragraph Liparidae was the most widely used during the nineteenth century; Orgyiidae and Dasychiridae had minor usage, but neither name became widely adopted. During the present century, Orgyiidae has been used occasionally in contrast with Lymantriidae, which has been used many hundreds of times throughout the world. In North America, the use of Liparidae has continued until, in the most recent revision of the family by Ferguson, 1978, in Dominick et al., Moths Am. N. of Mexico 22 (2), the family name Lymantriidae has been adopted. Because of the overwhelming worldwide use of the name Lymantriidae an application has been submitted by D. S. Fletcher, I. W. B. Nye and D. C. Ferguson to the International Commission on Zoological Nomenclature requesting them to rule that the family-group name Lymantriidae Hampson, [1893] is to be given nomenclatural precedence over the family-group names Orgyiidae Wallengren, 1861, and Dasychiridae Packard, 1864, when applied to the same taxon.

As pointed out, "Liparidae" once was an alternative family name for the Lymantriidae, but nowadays "Liparidae" is firmly established as the name of a family of fish, and according to the conventions of zoological taxonomy, family names have to be unique, even though they are permitted to coincide with botanical names.

=== Notable species and genera ===
- Brown-tail, Euproctis chrysorrhoea
- Yellow-tail, Sphrageidus similis
- Spongy moth, Lymantria dispar
- Nun moth, Lymantria monacha
- Dark tussock moth, Dicallomera fascelina
- Pale tussock moth, Calliteara pudibunda
- Northern pine tussock moth, Dasychira plagiata
- Arctic woollybear moth, Gynaephora groenlandica
- Rusty tussock moth or vapourer, Orgyia antiqua
- Western tussock moth, Orgyia vetusta
- White-marked tussock moth, Orgyia leucostigma
- Douglas-fir tussock moth, Orgyia pseudostugata
- Satin moth, Leucoma salicis
- Coca moth, Eloria noyesi
- Painted apple moth, Teia anartoides
- Rahona
