= List of moths of Canada (Lymantriidae) =

Partial list of Canadian moths

This is a list of the moths of subfamily Lymantriinae that are found in Canada. It also acts as an index to the species articles and forms part of the full List of moths of Canada.

Following the species name, there is an abbreviation that indicates the Canadian provinces or territories in which the species can be found.

- Western Canada
  - BC = British Columbia
  - AB = Alberta
  - SK = Saskatchewan
  - MB = Manitoba
  - YT = Yukon
  - NT = Northwest Territories
  - NU = Nunavut
- Eastern Canada
  - ON = Ontario
  - QC = Quebec
  - NB = New Brunswick
  - NS = Nova Scotia
  - PE = Prince Edward Island
  - NF = Newfoundland
  - LB = Labrador

- Euproctis chrysorrhoea (Linnaeus, 1758)-QC, NS
- Euproctis similis (Fuessly, 1775)-ON
- Leucoma salicis (Linnaeus, 1758)-BC, AB, ON, QC, NB, NS, PE, NF
- Lymantria dispar (Linnaeus, 1758)-BC, ON, QC, NB, NS
- Dasychira basiflava (Packard, 1864)-ON
- Dasychira dorsipennata (Barnes & McDunnough, 1919)-SK, MB, ON, QC, NB, NS
- Dasychira grisefacta (Dyar, 1911)-BC, AB, SK
- Dasychira obliquata (Grote & Robinson, 1866)-ON, QC
- Dasychira pinicola (Dyar, 1911)-ON
- Dasychira plagiata (Walker, 1865)-BC, AB, SK, MB, ON, QC, NB, NS, PE, NF
- Dasychira vagans (Barnes & McDunnough, 1913)-BC, AB, SK, MB, ON, QC, NB, NS, NF
- Gynaephora groenlandica (Wocke, 1874)-YT, NT, NU
- Gynaephora rossii Curtis, 1835-AB, YT, NT, NU, QC, NF
- Orgyia antiqua (Linnaeus, 1758)-BC, AB, SK, MB, YT, NT, ON, QC, NB, NS, PE, NF
- Orgyia definita Packard, 1864-ON, QC
- Orgyia leucostigma (Smith, 1797)-AB, SK, MB, ON, QC, NB, NS, PE, NF
- Orgyia pseudotsugata (McDunnough, 1921) -BC
