= Institute of Polish Philology =

Institute of Polish Philology (Polish: Instytut Filologii Polskiej) may refer to:

- Institute of Polish Philology, Gdańsk University (pl:Wydział Filologiczny Uniwersytetu Gdańskiego)
- Institute of Polish Philology, Jan Kochanowski University in Kielce (pl:Wydział Humanistyczny Uniwersytetu Jana Kochanowskiego w Kielcach#Instytut Filologii Polskiej)
- Institute of Polish Philology, Opole University (pl:Instytut Filologii Polskiej Uniwersytetu Opolskiego)
- Institute of Polish Philology, Wroclaw University (pl:Instytut Filologii Polskiej Uniwersytetu Wrocławskiego)
- Institute of Polish Philology, University of Zielona Góra (pl:Wydział Humanistyczny Uniwersytetu Zielonogórskiego#Instytut Filologii Polskiej)
