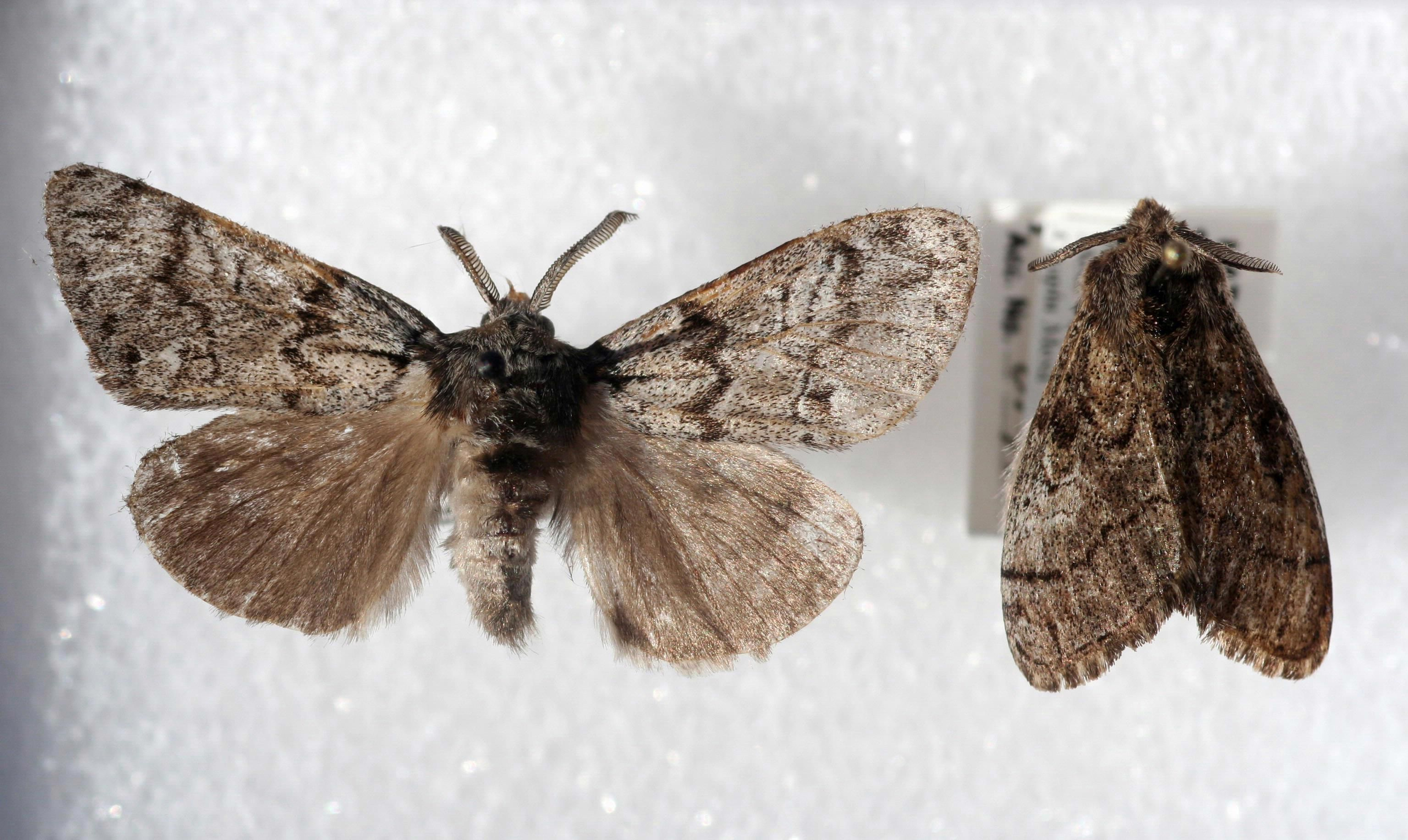
- Dasychira grisefacta

Scientific classification
- Kingdom: Animalia
- Phylum: Arthropoda
- Clade: Pancrustacea
- Class: Insecta
- Order: Lepidoptera
- Superfamily: Noctuoidea
- Family: Erebidae
- Subfamily: Lymantriinae
- Tribe: Orgyiini
- Genus: Dasychira; Hübner, 1809

Synonyms
- Anaxila Walker, 1855; Dediama Walker, 1855; Parorgyia Packard, [1865]; Noleca Walker, 1855; Boreconia Walker, 1865; Dicranuropsis Felder, 1874; Pseudonotodonta Möschler, 1887; Oecura Holland, 1893; Notohyba Holland, 1893; Thamnocera Holland, 1893; Bathmochtha Karsch, 1895; Notopriota Swinhoe, 1903; Rhodesana Bethune-Baker, 1908; Dasychirana Bethune-Baker, 1911; Bicelluphora Janse, 1915; Tessmannia Bryk, 1915; Dasylaelia Aurivillius, 1925; Macrolaelia Aurivillius, 1925; Sminthopses Hampson, 1926; Heptaptosis Talbot, 1929

= Dasychira =

Genus of moths

Dasychira is a genus of tussock moths in the family Erebidae described by Jacob Hübner in 1809. They are well distributed all over Africa, Europe, North America, Madagascar, Japan, China, India, Sri Lanka, Myanmar, Java and Australia.

== Description ==
Palpi porrect (extending forward), and second joint is heavily haired. Antennae with long branches in male and short in female. Legs hairy. Forewings with oblique outer margin. Hindwings with veins 3, 4 and 5 from close to angle of cell. Veins 6 and 7 stalked.

== Species ==
- Dasychira achatina Hering, 1926
- Dasychira acronyctina Schultze, 1934
- Dasychira aeana Collenette, 1931
- Dasychira aenotata Tams, 1930
- Dasychira aeschra (Hampson, 1926)
- Dasychira aethalodes Collenette, 1931
- Dasychira albescens Moore, 1879
- Dasychira albiapex Hering, 1926
- Dasychira albibasalis (Holland, 1893)
- Dasychira albicostata (Holland, 1893)
- Dasychira albilinea (Holland, 1893)
- Dasychira albilunulata (Karsch, 1895)
- Dasychira albinotata (Holland, 1893)
- Dasychira albiplaga Swinhoe, 1908
- Dasychira alboschistacea Rothschild, 1915
- Dasychira albosignata Holland, 1893
- Dasychira albospargata (Holland, 1893)
- Dasychira allotria Hering, 1926
- Dasychira amydropa Collenette, 1960
- Dasychira anaha Swinhoe, 1906
- Dasychira anasses Collenette, 1937
- Dasychira andulo Collenette, 1936
- Dasychira anoista Collenette, 1960
- Dasychira antica (Walker, 1855)
- Dasychira aphanes Collenette, 1938
- Dasychira aphanta Collenette, 1960
- Dasychira apicata (Holland, 1893)
- Dasychira aprepes Collenette, 1956
- Dasychira arctioides (Holland, 1893)
- Dasychira argiloides (Holland, 1893)
- Dasychira aridela Collenette, 1956
- Dasychira astraphaea Collenette, 1931
- Dasychira atrivenosa (Palm, 1873)
- Dasychira azelota Collenette, 1933
- Dasychira basiflava (Packard, [1865]) – yellow-based tussock moth
- Dasychira celaenica Collenette, 1955
- Dasychira cinnamomea (Grote & Robinson, 1866) – cinnamon tussock moth
- Dasychira colini (Mabille, 1893)
- Dasychira dominickaria Ferguson, 1978
- Dasychira dorsipennata (Barnes & McDunnough, 1919) – sharp-lined tussock moth
- Dasychira griseata (Rothschild, 1915)
- Dasychira grisefacta (Dyar, 1911)
- Dasychira groetscheli Bryk, 1934
- Dasychira hadromeres Collenette, 1955
- Dasychira ibele Collenette, 1955
- Dasychira leucophaea (Smith, 1797)
- Dasychira manto (Strecker, 1900) – Manto tussock moth
- Dasychira matheri Ferguson, 1978
- Dasychira meridionalis (Barnes & McDunnough, 1913) – southern tussock moth
- Dasychira mescalera Ferguson, 1978
- Dasychira moerens Felder, 1894
- Dasychira nigrita (Rothschild, 1915)
- Dasychira obliquata (Grote & Robinson, 1866) – streaked tussock moth
- Dasychira pinicola (Dyar, 1911) – pine tussock moth
- Dasychira plagiata (Walker, 1865) – northern pine tussock moth
- Dasychira plagosa Rothschild, 1915
- Dasychira rana Collenette, 1932
- Dasychira sagittiphora Hering, 1926
- Dasychira satelles Collenette, 1939
- Dasychira saussurei Dewitz, 1881
- Dasychira scaea Collenette, 1953
- Dasychira scotina Hering, 1926
- Dasychira scurra Hering, 1926
- Dasychira selene Schultze, 1934
- Dasychira selenitica (Esper, 1783)
- Dasychira semlikiensis Collenette, 1939
- Dasychira solida (Karsch, 1895)
- Dasychira sordida (Möschler, 1887)
- Dasychira soyensis Collenette, 1939
- Dasychira spargata Hering, 1926
- Dasychira sphalera Hering, 1926
- Dasychira sphaleroides Hering, 1926
- Dasychira statheuta Collenette, 1937
- Dasychira stegmanni Grünberg, 1910
- Dasychira striata (Holland, 1893)
- Dasychira strigidentata Bethune-Baker, 1911
- Dasychira stygis Collenette, 1936
- Dasychira styx Bethune-Baker, 1911
- Dasychira tephra Hübner, [1809] – tephra tussock moth
- Dasychira thwaitesi Moore, [1883]
- Dasychira vagans (Barnes & McDunnough, 1913) – variable tussock moth
