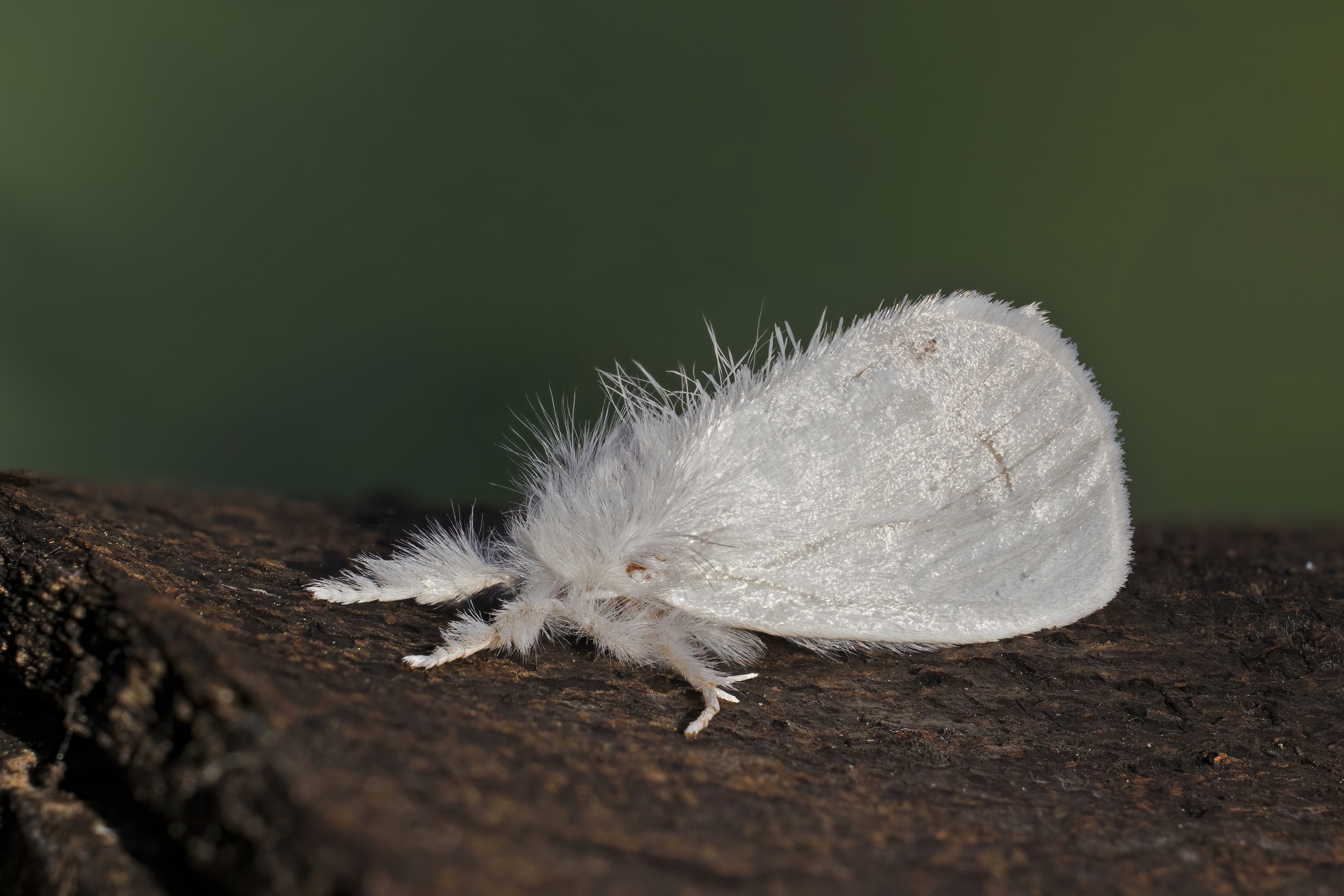

Scientific classification
- Domain: Eukaryota
- Kingdom: Animalia
- Phylum: Arthropoda
- Class: Insecta
- Order: Lepidoptera
- Superfamily: Noctuoidea
- Family: Erebidae
- Genus: Euproctis
- Species: E. similis

Binomial name
- Euproctis similis (Füssli, 1775)

Synonyms
- Phalaena similis Fuessly, 1775; Bombyx auriflua Denis & Schiffermüller, 1775; Porthesia nyctea Grum-Grshimailo, 1891; Porthesia rebeli Haberhauer, 1902; Porthesia similis (Fuessly, 1775); Porthesia similis var. xanthocampa Dyar, 1905; Porthesia similis ab. trimaculata Strand, 1913; Porthesia similis ab. quadrimaculata Strand, 1913; Porthesia similis f. coreaceola Matsumura, 1933; Porthesia similis sjöquisti Bryk, 1942; Porthesia similis variabilina Bryk, [1949]; Euproctis similis (Fuessly, 1775)

= Yellow-tail =

Species of moth

The yellow-tail, goldtail moth or swan moth (Sphrageidus similis) is a moth of the family Erebidae. The species was first described by Johann Kaspar Füssli in 1775, and has commonly been placed within the related genus Euproctis. It is distributed throughout Europe to the Urals, then east across the Palearctic to Siberia and south to India and Sri Lanka.

This species has a wingspan of 35–45 mm, the female usually noticeably larger than the male. All parts of the adults are pure white, apart from a bright yellow tip to the abdomen (larger in the female) and a small black or brown tornal mark on the forewing of the male.

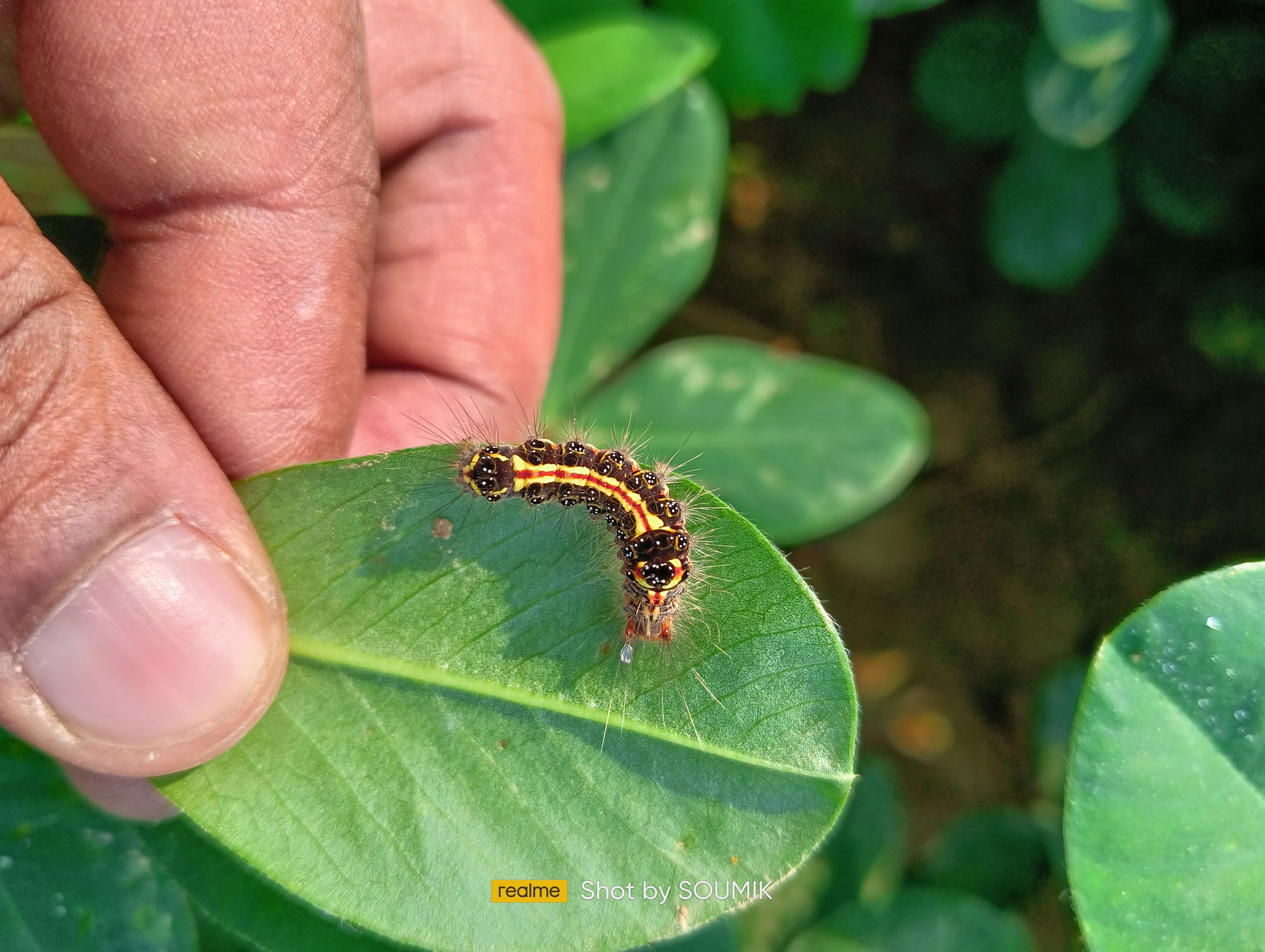
early instar caterpillar

== Technical description and variation ==
White, and very like Euproctis chrysorrhoea, but more pure silky white, anal wool and hairs at the apex of the abdomen of the female golden yellow. Not rarely, especially in the male sex, color forms occur with small dark spots on the forewing: form "auriflua" has three spots at the inner angle, forming an oblique transverse row, and one spot in the basal area near the hindmargin; form "nyctea" has only one spot at the inner angle as well as one in the basal area like "auriflua"; form "trimaculata" is like "nyctea" but has another spot on the costal margin opposite the subbasal inner marginal spot, while form "quadrimaculata" has a fourth subapical spot. The two latter forms are from eastern Asia, where spotted specimens of this species seem on the whole to be commoner than in Europe.

== Biology ==
It flies at night in July and August and is attracted to light, especially the males.

Larva black, with sparse black grey hairs, a brick-red divided longitudinal dorsal stripe, white lateral stripes and black head, segment 1 black streaked with yellow, the tubercles on segments 4 and 11 also black. It usually feeds on trees and shrubs such as alder, apple, birch, blackcurrant, blackthorn, cherry, chestnut, hawthorn, oak, rowan and sallow. It has also been recorded on monkshood, which is a herbaceous plant. This species overwinters as a larva. The larvae disperse soon after emerging from the eggs, which are covered with the anal wool of the female, hibernate singly and pupate at the beginning of June. Pupa blackish brown in a whitish cocoon. It is common everywhere in the distribution area, but not in such numbers as the very similar Euproctis chrysorrhoea, and not noxious. The moth comes to the light and when at rest folds the wings very steeply in roof-shape; when touched it feigns death, lying on its side with the wings closed.

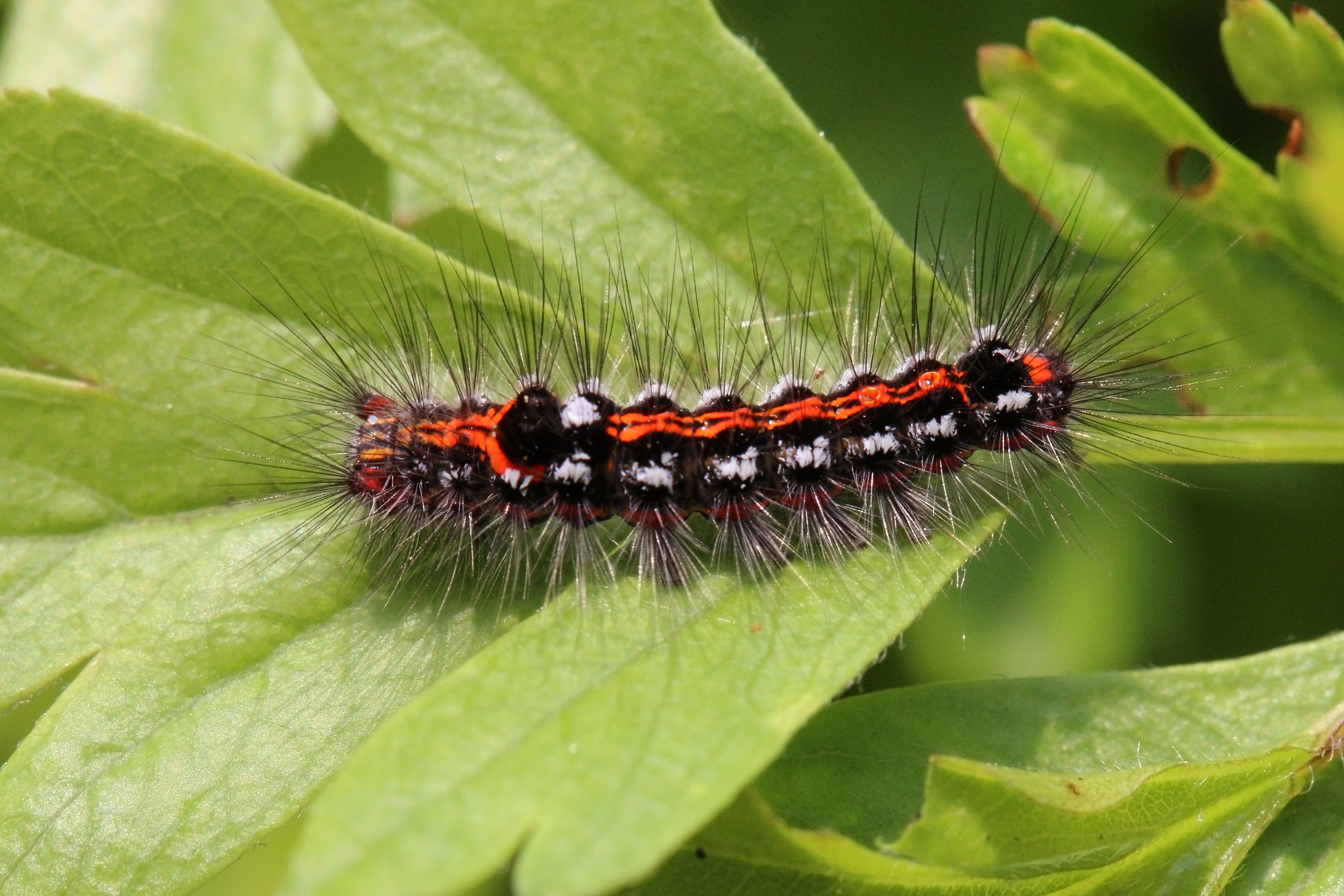
Caterpillar

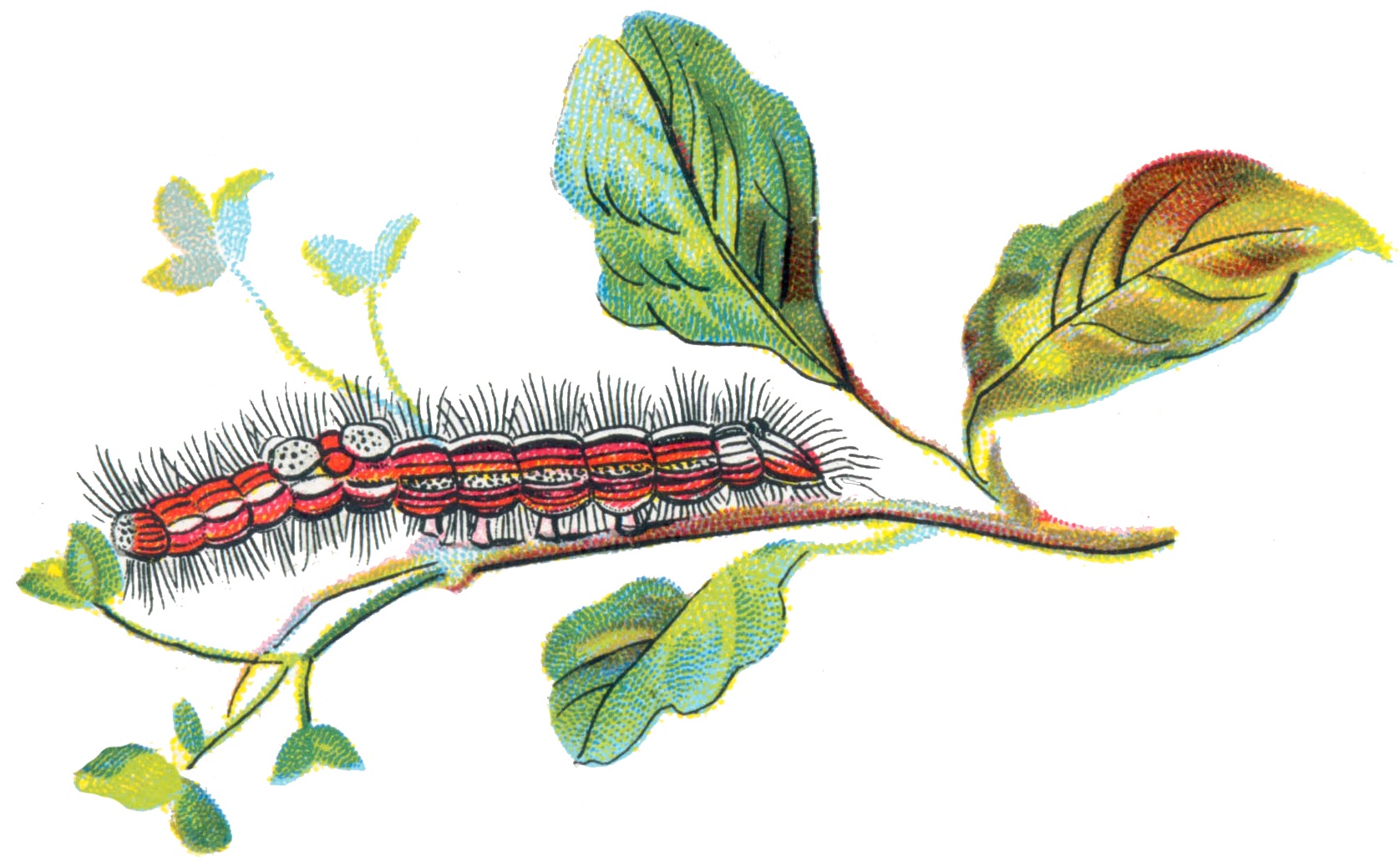
Illustrated caterpillar

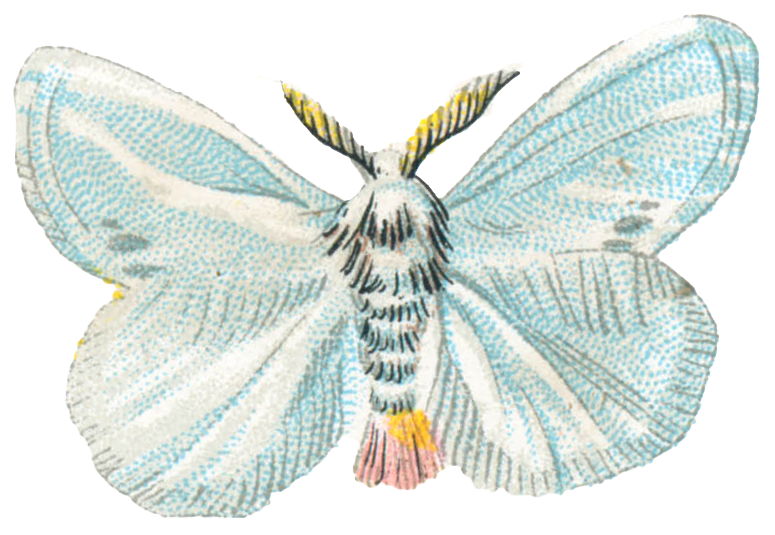
Illustrated adult

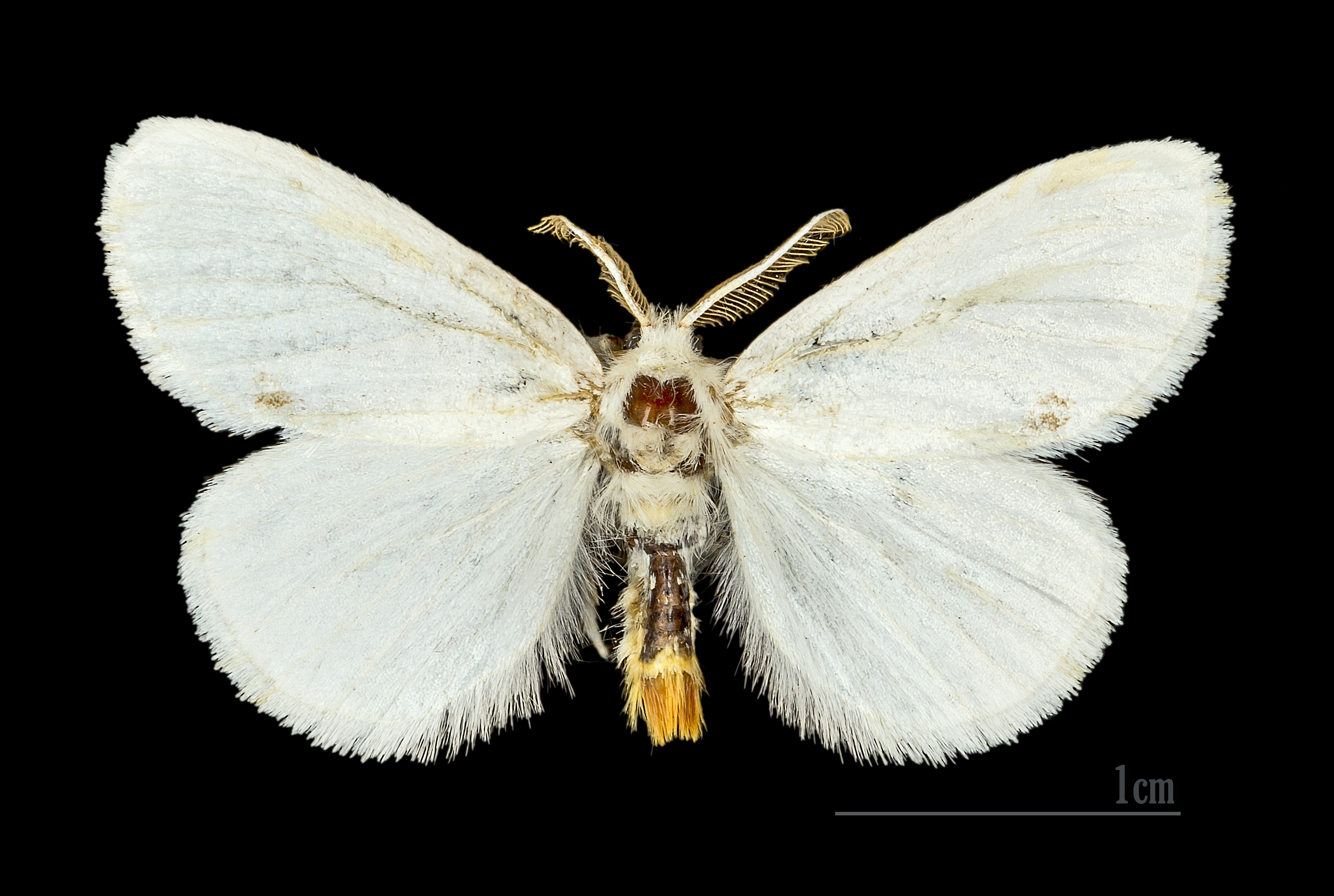
Male

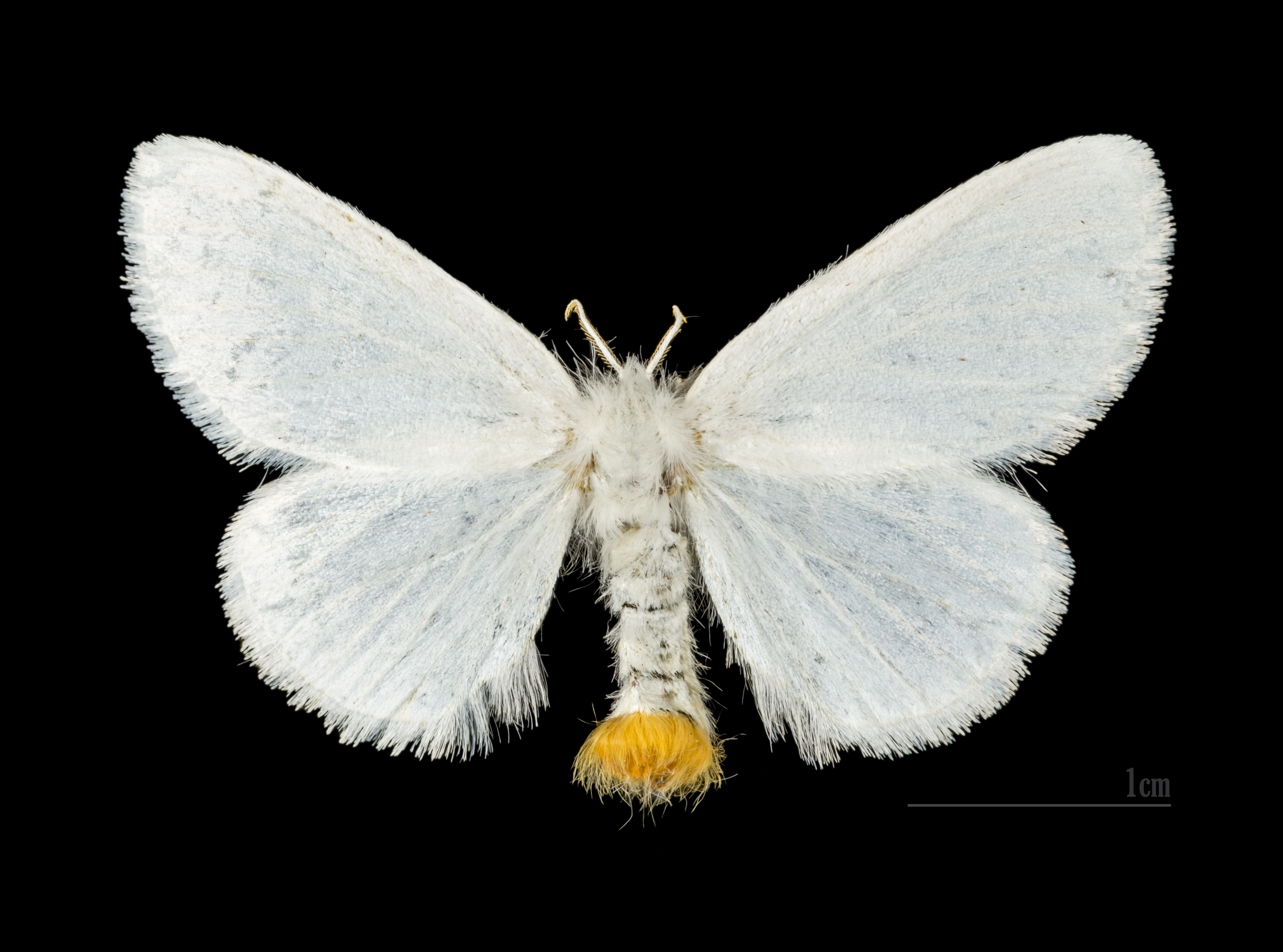
Female

== See also ==
- Yellowtail moth – a moth from South America

== Notes ==
1. The flight season refers to the British Isles. This may vary in other parts of the range.
