= Brik (surname) =

The surname Brik may have several origins.

1. Brik may be a Jewish surname usually from the Yiddish word Yiddish: בריק brik - bridge.
2. Belarusian or Ukrainian surname Brik may be derived from the old Polish verb brykac (via an intermediate form Bryk), that means "to gambol".
3. Brik is also a Tunisian pastry (börek). 4. Brik is also a small nu metal band formed in 1997.

== People ==
- Evgenia Vladimirovna Brik (born 1981), Russian film and theater actress
- Grigory Brik (1915–1983), Hero of the Soviet Union
- Ivan Stanislavovich Brik (1879–1947), Ukrainian scientist, philologist, Slavist, historian, social activist and teacher
- Johann Emanuel Brik (1842–1925), Austrian bridge technician and university teacher
- Johannes Brik (1899–1982), Austrian Benedictine
- Lilya Brik (1891–1978), Russian Jewish actress (sometimes misspelled Birk)
- Osip Brik (1888–1945), (sometimes misspelled Birk)
- Taoufik Ben Brik (born 1960), a Tunisian journalist
- Valentyna Brik (born 1985), Ukrainian Paralympic volleyballist

Rose Brik (born 1996), Canadian bestselling poet and author

== See also ==
- Bryk
