= Bryk =

Bryk is a surname. Notable people with the name include:

- Anthony Bryk, American educational researcher
- Billy Bryk (born 1999), Canadian actor and filmmaker
- Dan Bryk (born 1970), Canadian singer-songwriter and recording artist
- Dempsey Bryk (born 1996), American-Canadian actor and filmmaker
- Donald Bryk, Canadian judge
- Felix Bryk (1882–1957), Swedish anthropologist and entomologist
- Greg Bryk (born 1972), Canadian film and television actor
- Józef Bryk (born 1960), Polish politician, entrepreneur, and local government
- Rut Bryk (1916–1999), Finnish ceramist
- William Bryk (born 1955) New York bankruptcy attorney and perennial candidate

== See also ==
- Brik (surname)
