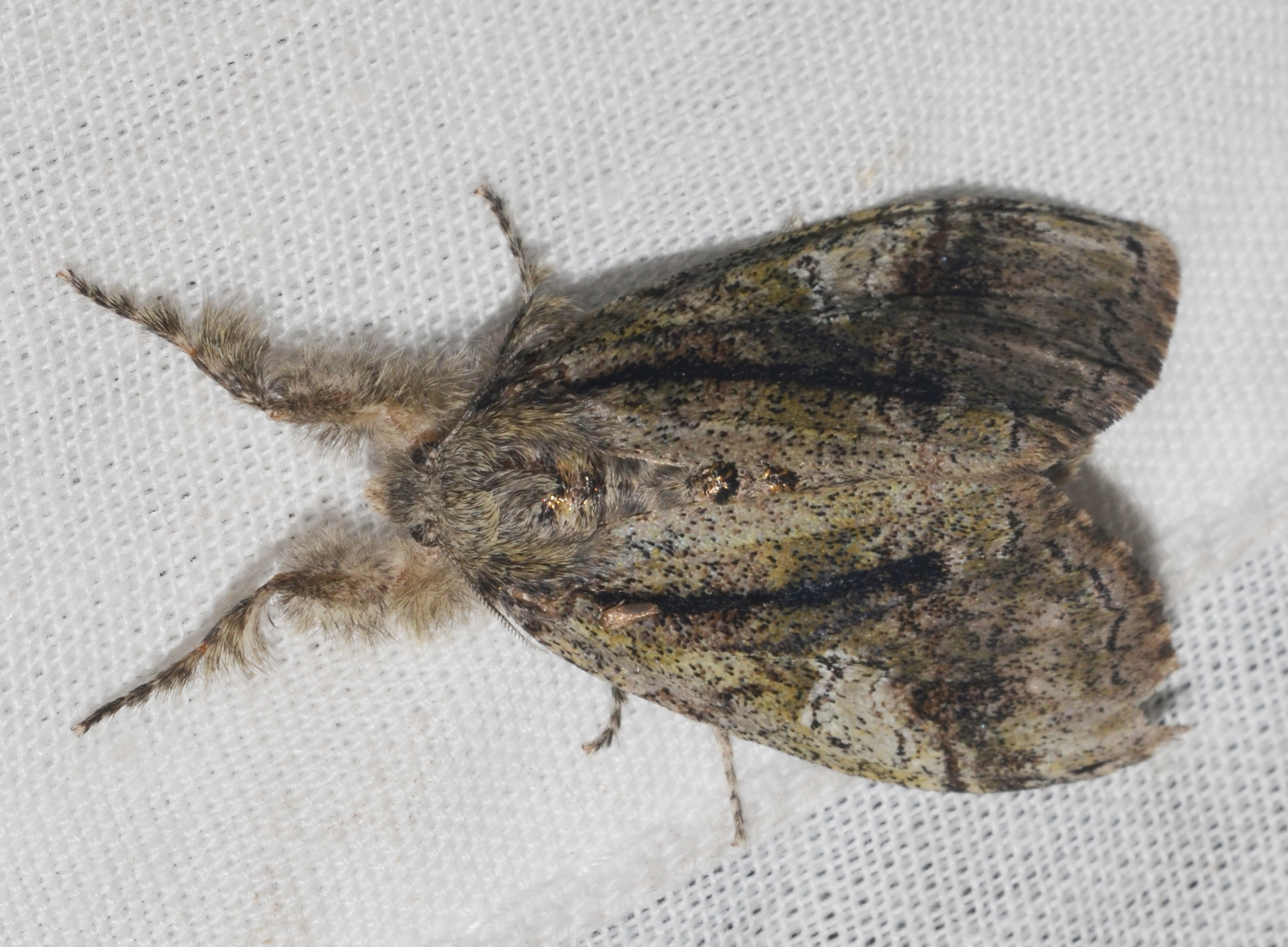

Scientific classification
- Kingdom: Animalia
- Phylum: Arthropoda
- Clade: Pancrustacea
- Class: Insecta
- Order: Lepidoptera
- Superfamily: Noctuoidea
- Family: Erebidae
- Tribe: Orgyiini
- Genus: Dasychira
- Species: D. tephra

Binomial name
- Dasychira tephra Hubner, 1809

= Dasychira tephra =

Species of moth

Dasychira tephra, the tephra tussock moth, is a tussock moth in the family Erebidae. The species was first described by Jacob Hübner in 1809. It is found in North America.

The MONA or Hodges number for Dasychira tephra is 8292.

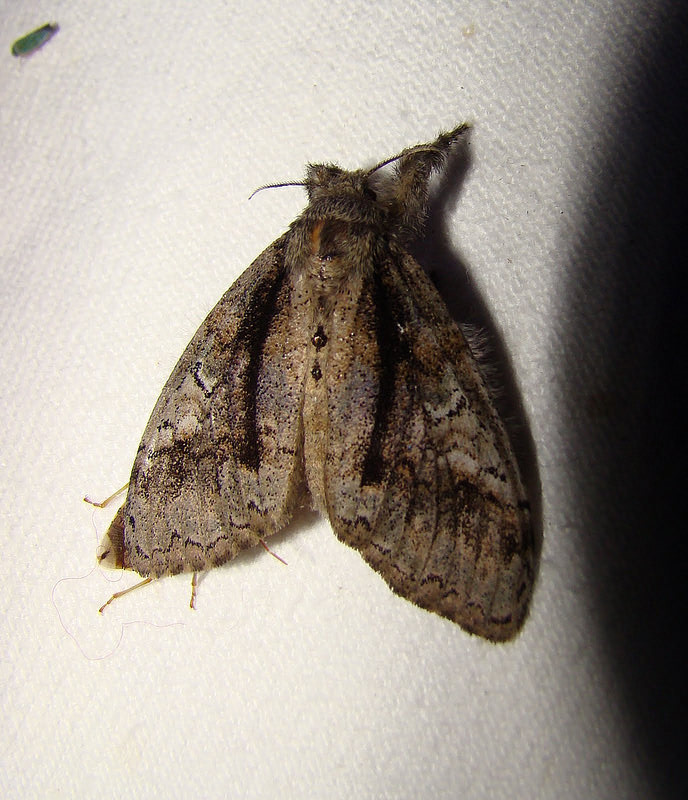
