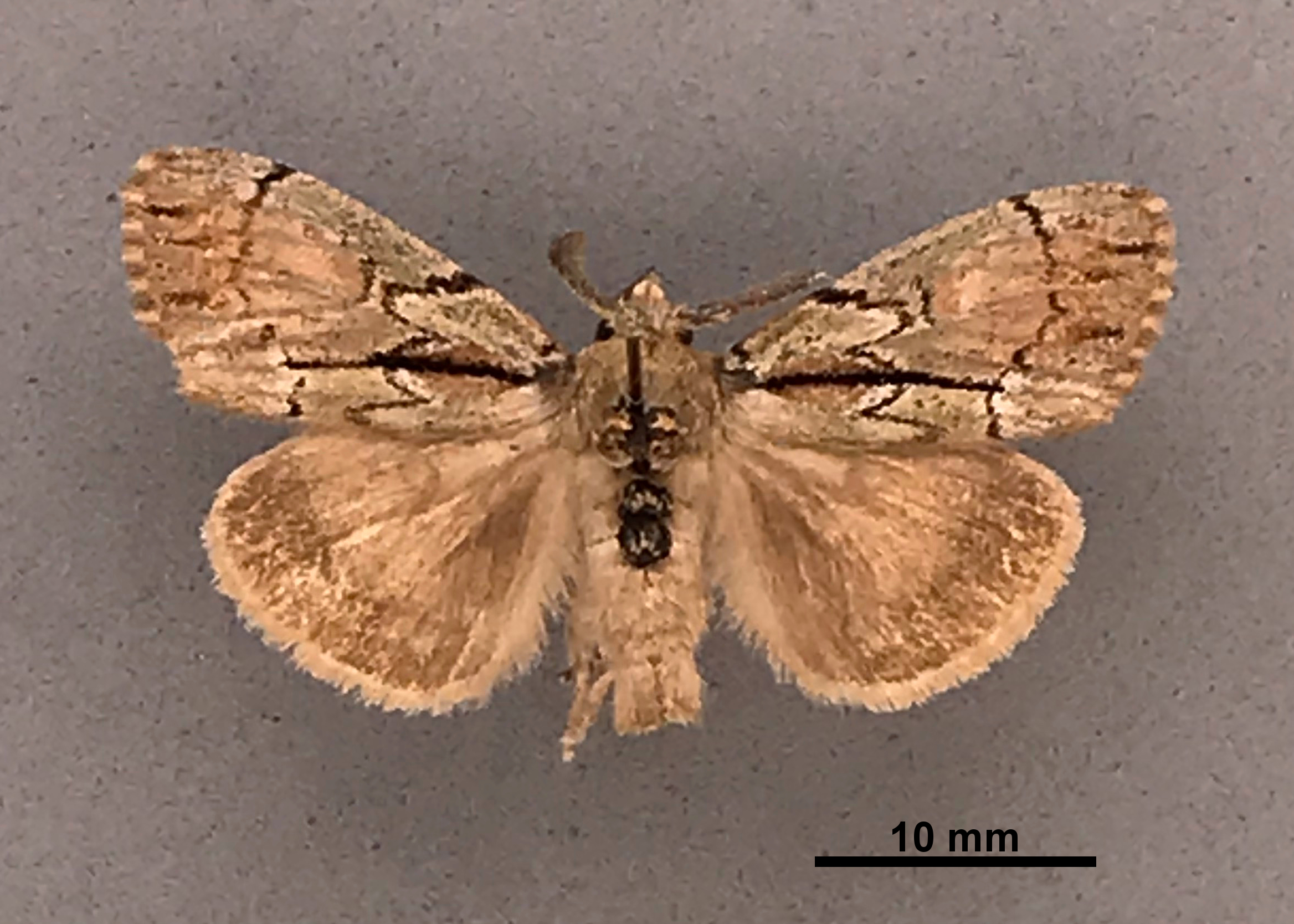

Scientific classification
- Domain: Eukaryota
- Kingdom: Animalia
- Phylum: Arthropoda
- Class: Insecta
- Order: Lepidoptera
- Superfamily: Noctuoidea
- Family: Erebidae
- Tribe: Orgyiini
- Genus: Dasychira
- Species: D. dominickaria

Binomial name
- Dasychira dominickaria Ferguson, 1977

= Dasychira dominickaria =

Species of moth

Dasychira dominickaria, or Dominick's tussock moth, is a species of tussock moth in the family Erebidae. It is found in North America.

The MONA or Hodges number for Dasychira dominickaria is 8303.
