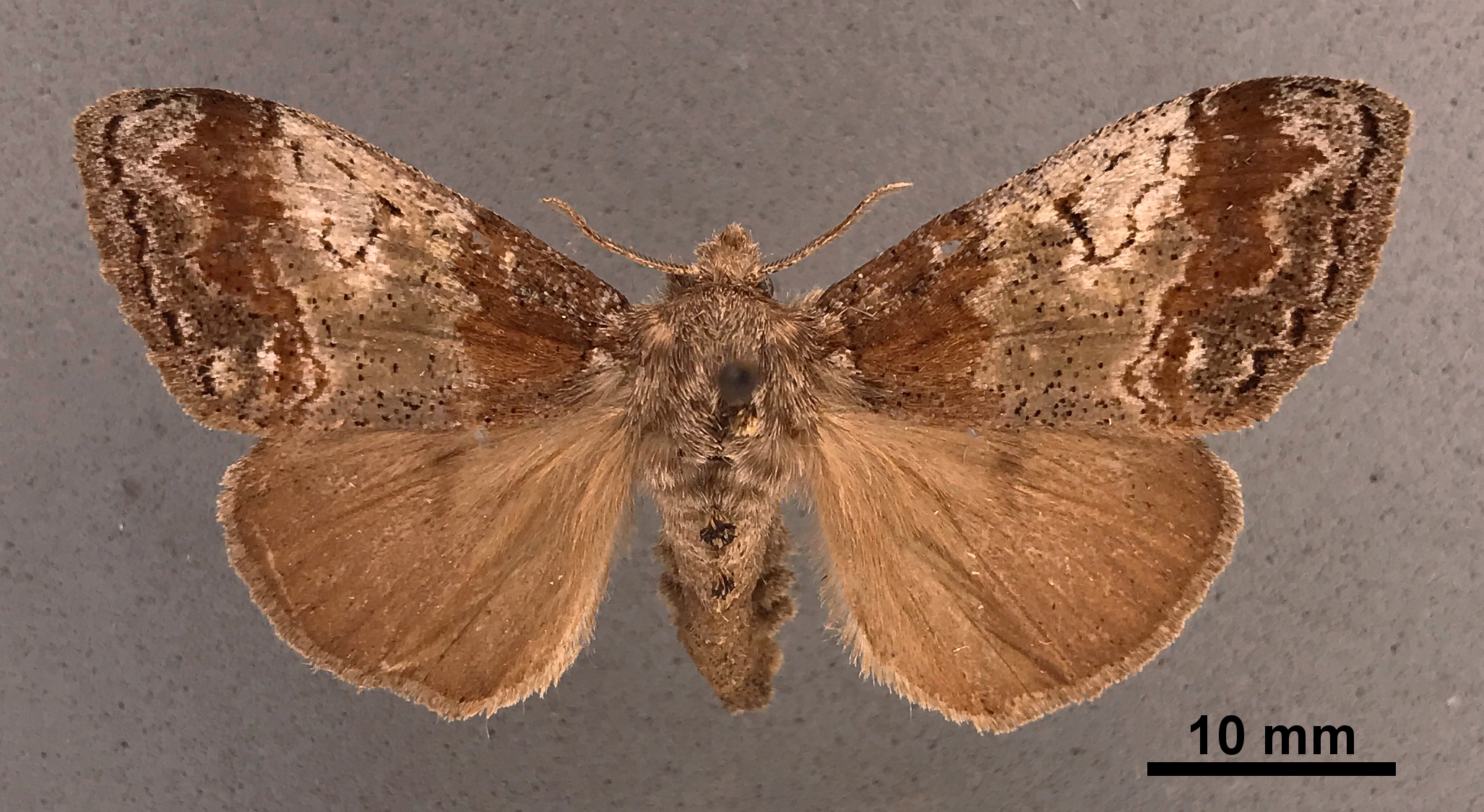

Scientific classification
- Kingdom: Animalia
- Phylum: Arthropoda
- Class: Insecta
- Order: Lepidoptera
- Superfamily: Noctuoidea
- Family: Erebidae
- Tribe: Orgyiini
- Genus: Dasychira
- Species: D. cinnamomea

Binomial name
- Dasychira cinnamomea (Grote & Robinson, 1866)

= Dasychira cinnamomea =

Species of moth

Dasychira cinnamomea, the cinnamon tussock moth, is a species of tussock moth in the family Erebidae. It is found in North America.

The MONA or Hodges number for Dasychira cinnamomea is 8300.
