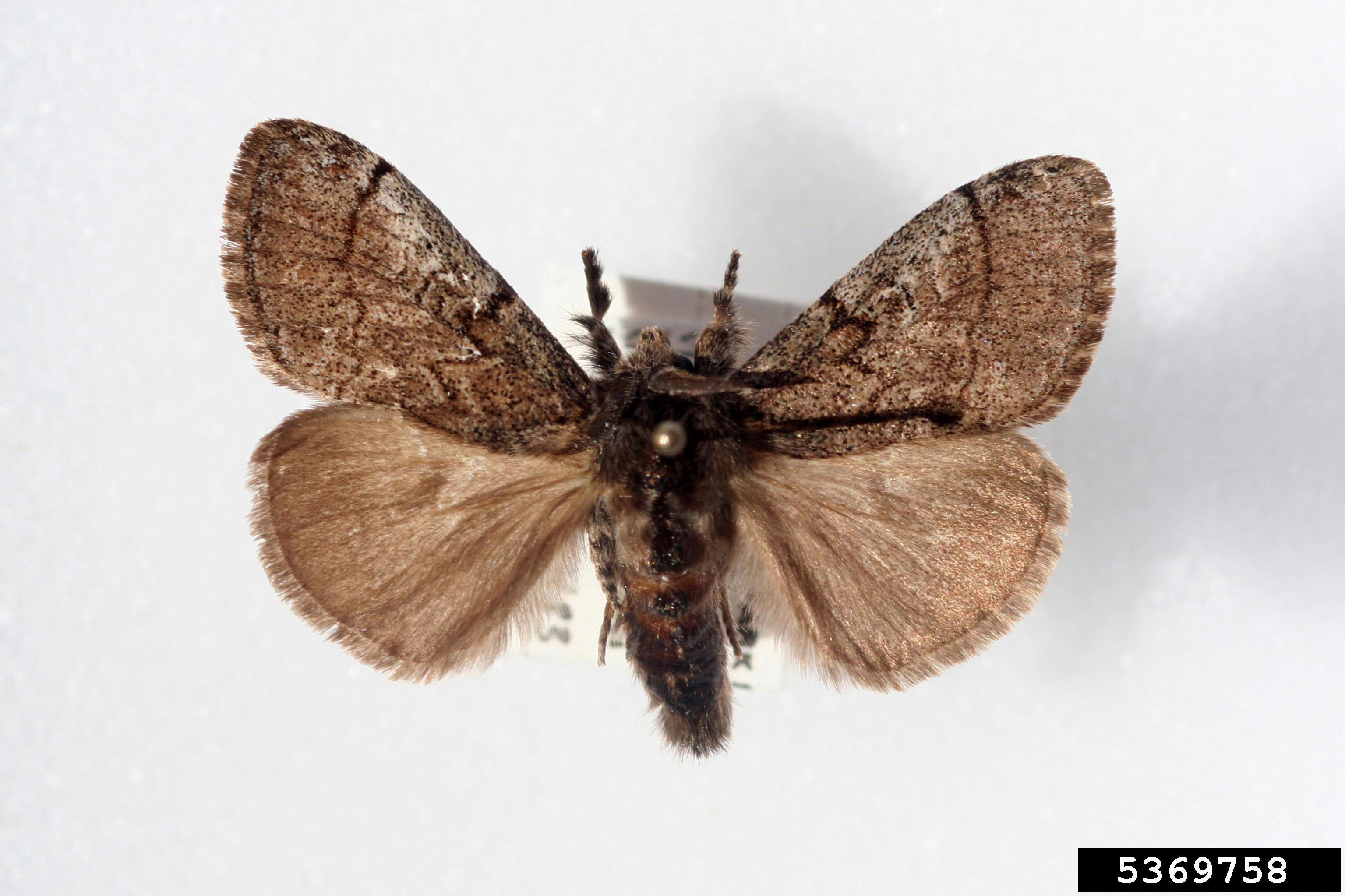

Scientific classification
- Domain: Eukaryota
- Kingdom: Animalia
- Phylum: Arthropoda
- Class: Insecta
- Order: Lepidoptera
- Superfamily: Noctuoidea
- Family: Erebidae
- Genus: Dasychira
- Species: D. mescalera

Binomial name
- Dasychira mescalera Ferguson, 1978

= Dasychira mescalera =

Species of moth

Dasychira mescalera is a species of moth of the family Erebidae first described by Alexander Douglas Campbell Ferguson in 1978. It is found in New Mexico, Texas and Colorado.
