= Dasychira styx =

Scientific classification
- Domain: Eukaryota
- Kingdom: Animalia
- Phylum: Arthropoda
- Class: Insecta
- Order: Lepidoptera
- Superfamily: Noctuoidea
- Family: Erebidae
- Genus: Dasychira
- Species: D. styx

Binomial name
- Dasychira styx Bethune-Baker, 1911

Synonyms
- Orgyia styx Swinhoe, 1932

Erebid moth species in subfamily Lymantriinae

Dasychira styx is a species of erebid moths in the subfamily Lymantriinae. It was described by George Thomas Bethune-Baker in 1911. Its type locality is in Angola.
