= Józef Bryk =

Polish politician

Voivode of Świętokrzyskie Voivodeship
- Incumbent
- Assumed office December 2023
- President: Andrzej Duda; Karol Nawrocki
- Prime Minister: Donald Tusk
- Preceded by: Zbigniew Koniusz

Personal details
- Born: 20 March 1960 (age 66) Staszów, Polish People's Republic
- Citizenship: Poland
- Party: Civic Platform
- Education: Jan Kochanowski University
- Occupation: Politician

Józef Bryk (born March 20, 1960 in Staszów) is Polish politician, entrepreneur, and local government official who is serving as Voivode of the Świętokrzyskie Voivodeship since 2023.

== Biography ==
He graduated in management from the Jan Kochanowski University in Kielce. He also completed postgraduate studies in internal audit management of public finance units at the Kraków University of Economics and in transport and logistics at the Kielce University of Economics. He started his own business in the transport industry and worked at a driver training center in Staszów. From 2010 to 2016, he served as the Świętokrzyskie Voivodeship Road Transport Inspector.

Activist of the Civic Platform party. From 2006 to 2014, he served two terms on the Staszów City Council. He unsuccessfully ran for the Sejm in 2011, 2019, and 2023 and for the Senate in 2015.

In 2021, he was appointed a councillor of the 6th term of the Świętokrzyskie Voivodeship Sejmik (vacated following the death of Grigor Shaginian). In December 2023, he was appointed Voivode of the Świętokrzyskie Voivodeship.
