= Dasychira moerens =

Scientific classification
- Domain: Eukaryota
- Kingdom: Animalia
- Phylum: Arthropoda
- Class: Insecta
- Order: Lepidoptera
- Superfamily: Noctuoidea
- Family: Erebidae
- Genus: Dasychira
- Species: D. moerens

Binomial name
- Dasychira moerens Felder, 1894

Synonyms
- Liparis moerens Swinhoe, 1923

Species of moth

Dasychira moerens is a moth of the family Erebidae first described by Felder in 1894. It is found in South India and Sri Lanka.

The caterpillar is known to feed on Rosa, Theobroma cacao, Smilax and Vitis species.
