= Dasychira colini =

Scientific classification
- Kingdom: Animalia
- Phylum: Arthropoda
- Class: Insecta
- Order: Lepidoptera
- Superfamily: Noctuoidea
- Family: Erebidae
- Genus: Dasychira
- Species: D. colini

Binomial name
- Dasychira colini (Mabille, 1893)

Synonyms
- Areas colini Mabille, 1893

Species of moth

Dasychira colini is a species of moth of the subfamily Lymantriinae first described by Paul Mabille in 1893. It is known from Madagascar and Senegal.

The female has a wingspan of 52 mm. The wings are of pure and uniform white colour. Body is snow white, back of rings in palish yellow. Mabille named this species after the director of the Royal Observatory of Madagascar, R. P. E. Colin.
