= Dasychira thwaitesi =

Scientific classification
- Domain: Eukaryota
- Kingdom: Animalia
- Phylum: Arthropoda
- Class: Insecta
- Order: Lepidoptera
- Superfamily: Noctuoidea
- Family: Erebidae
- Genus: Dasychira
- Species: D. thwaitesi

Binomial name
- Dasychira thwaitesi Moore, [1883]

Synonyms
- Dasychira pudica Moore, [1887]; Orgyia thwaitesi C. Swinhoe, 1923

Species of moth

Dasychira thwaitesi is a moth of the family Erebidae first described by Frederic Moore in 1883. It is found in India and Sri Lanka.

The caterpillar is a minor pest on Camellia sinensis. Caterpillars are primary hosts for many parasitoid wasps such as Brachymeria euploeae and Brachymeria lasus.
