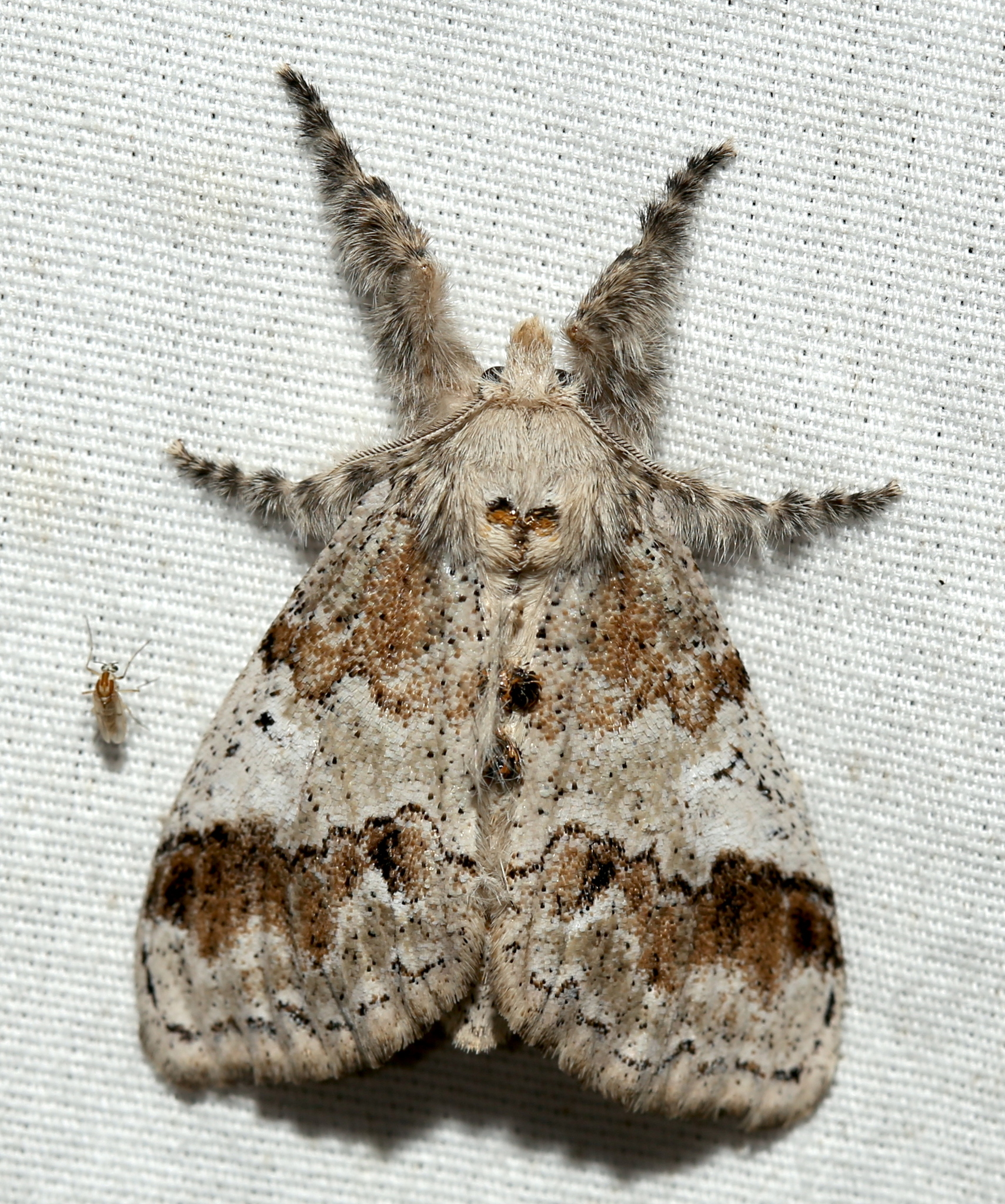

Scientific classification
- Kingdom: Animalia
- Phylum: Arthropoda
- Class: Insecta
- Order: Lepidoptera
- Superfamily: Noctuoidea
- Family: Erebidae
- Tribe: Orgyiini
- Genus: Dasychira
- Species: D. leucophaea

Binomial name
- Dasychira leucophaea (J. E. Smith, 1797)

= Dasychira leucophaea =

Species of moth

Dasychira leucophaea, the pale-banded tussock moth, is a species of tussock moth in the family Erebidae. It is found in North America.

The MONA or Hodges number for Dasychira leucophaea is 8301.
