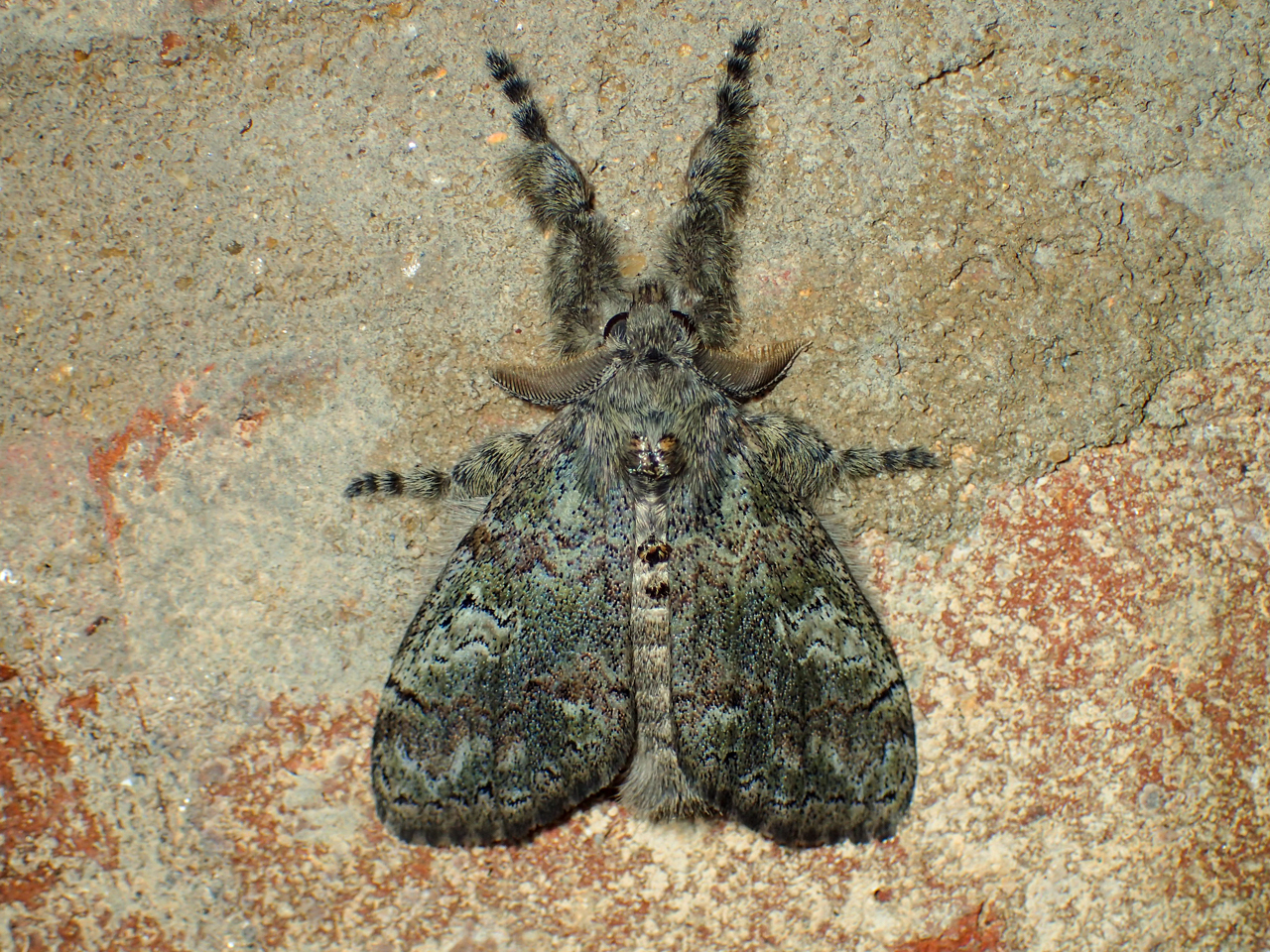

Scientific classification
- Kingdom: Animalia
- Phylum: Arthropoda
- Clade: Pancrustacea
- Class: Insecta
- Order: Lepidoptera
- Superfamily: Noctuoidea
- Family: Erebidae
- Genus: Dasychira
- Species: D. meridionalis

Binomial name
- Dasychira meridionalis (Barnes & McDunnough, 1913)

= Dasychira meridionalis =

Species of moth

Dasychira meridionalis, the southern tussock moth, is a species of tussock moth in the family Erebidae. It was first described by William Barnes and James Halliday McDunnough in 1913, and it is found in North America.
