= Zbigniew Koniusz =

Polish politician (born 1964)

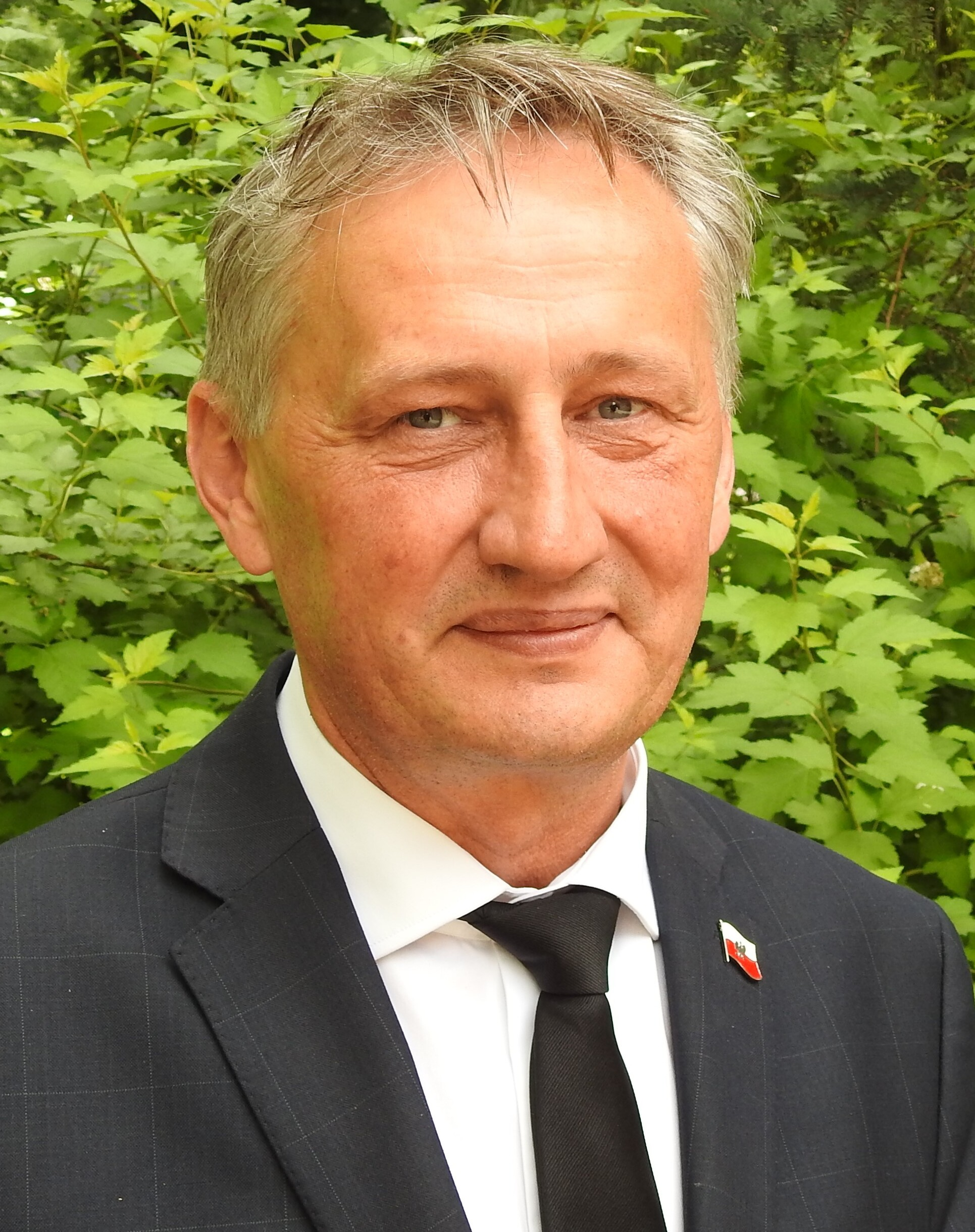
- Koniusz in 2020

Voivode of Świętokrzyskie Voivodeship
- In office November 2019 – December 2023
- President: Andrzej Duda
- Prime Minister: Mateusz Morawiecki
- Preceded by: Agata Wojtyszek
- Succeeded by: Józef Bryk

Personal details
- Born: 3 October 1964 (age 62) Pińczów, Polish People's Republic
- Citizenship: Poland
- Party: Independent
- Education: Medical University of Białystok
- Occupation: Politician
- Awards: Cross of Merit; Badge of Honor of Świętokrzyskie Voivodeship

Zbigniew Adam Koniusz (born October 3, 1964 in Pińczów) is a Polish pediatrician and local government official, Doctor of Medical Sciences who served as the Voivode of the Świętokrzyskie Voivodeship from 2019 to 2023.

== Biography ==
He was born in Pińczów He graduated with a medical degree from the Medical University of Białystok. In 1994, he obtained a doctorate in medical sciences from the same university, based on a thesis entitled "Catabolism of glycoconjugates in rats exposed to cadmium and lead". He also completed postgraduate studies in healthcare management. He is a specialist in pediatrics. For over a decade, he was the head of the Świętokrzyskie Emergency Medical Services and Ambulance Transport Center in Pińczów and also held managerial positions in healthcare facilities. He was also a coordinating physician in the Department of Security and Crisis Management of the Świętokrzyskie Voivodeship Office.

As a local government official, he was associated with the Law and Justice party. In 2002, he was first elected to the Pińczów County Council and re-elected in 2006, 2010, 2014, and 2018. He served as chairman of the county council's health committee. He was also a Law and Justice candidate in the 2015 Sejm elections. He was also the initiator of the Świętokrzyskie Emergency Medical Services Rally.

On November 12, 2019, Prime Minister Mateusz Morawiecki appointed him Voivode of the Świętokrzyskie Voivodeship. He held this position until December 2023. In 2024, he was re-elected to the county council.
