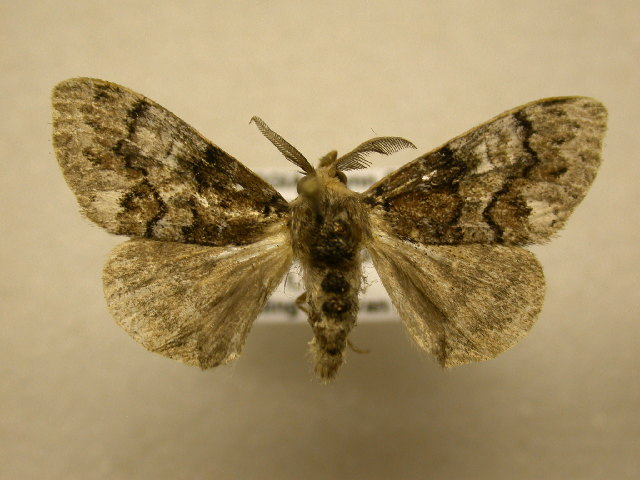

Scientific classification
- Domain: Eukaryota
- Kingdom: Animalia
- Phylum: Arthropoda
- Class: Insecta
- Order: Lepidoptera
- Superfamily: Noctuoidea
- Family: Erebidae
- Genus: Dasychira
- Species: D. manto

Binomial name
- Dasychira manto (Strecker, 1900)

= Dasychira manto =

Species of moth

Dasychira manto, the Manto tussock moth, is a species of tussock moth in the family Erebidae. It was first described by Herman Strecker in 1900 and it is found in North America.

The MONA or Hodges number for Dasychira manto is 8307.

== Subspecies ==
There are two subspecies:

- Dasychira manto interposita Dyar, 1911^{c g}
- Dasychira manto manto^{g}

Data sources: i = ITIS, c = Catalogue of Life, g = GBIF, b = BugGuide
