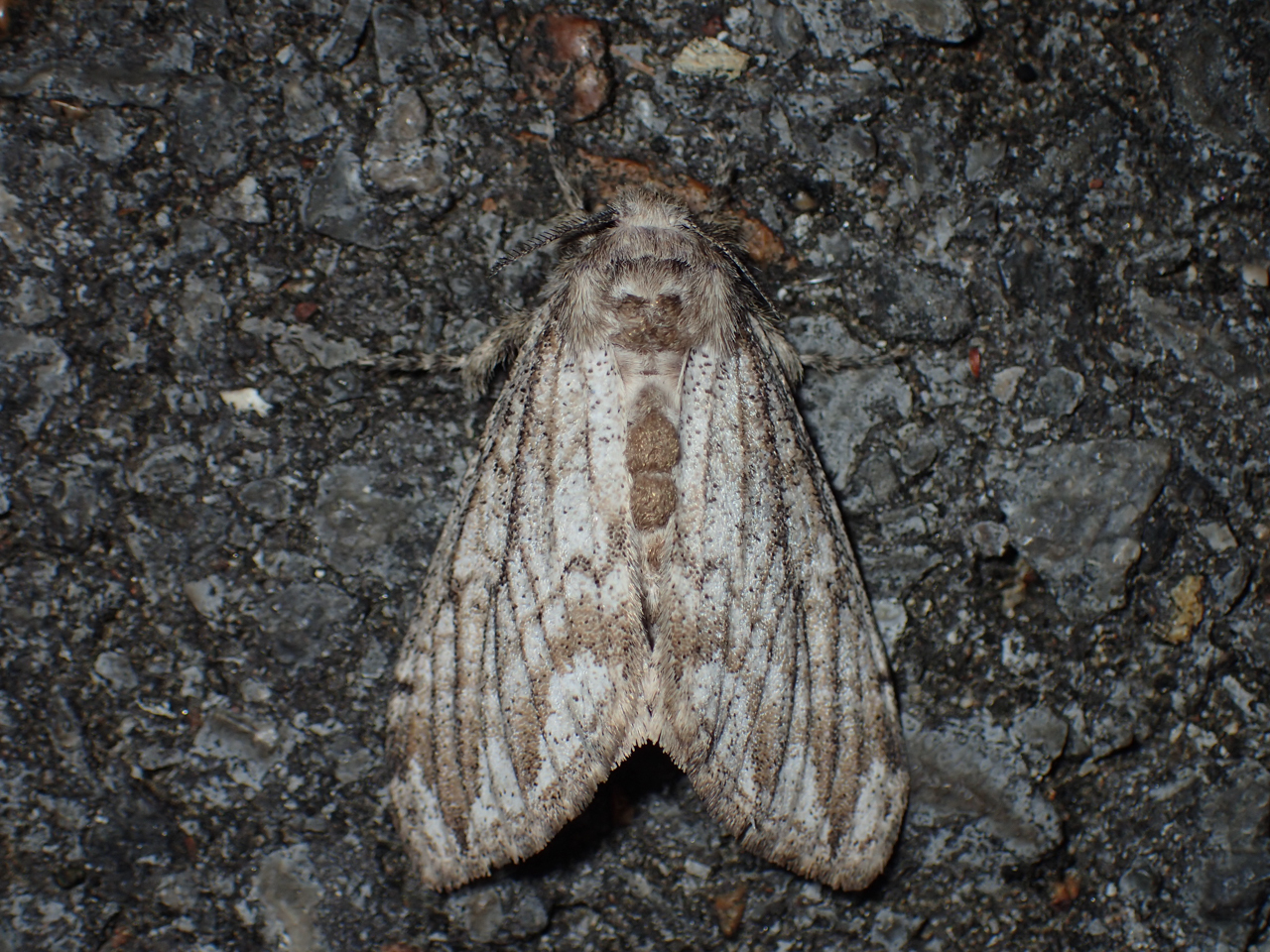

Scientific classification
- Domain: Eukaryota
- Kingdom: Animalia
- Phylum: Arthropoda
- Class: Insecta
- Order: Lepidoptera
- Superfamily: Noctuoidea
- Family: Erebidae
- Tribe: Orgyiini
- Genus: Dasychira
- Species: D. atrivenosa

Binomial name
- Dasychira atrivenosa (Palm, 1873)

= Dasychira atrivenosa =

Species of moth

Dasychira atrivenosa, the diminutive tussock moth, is a species of tussock moth in the family Erebidae. It is found in North America.

The MONA or Hodges number for Dasychira atrivenosa is 8299.
