= Matsumura =

Matsumura (written: 松村 lit. "pine tree village") is a Japanese surname. Notable people with the surname include:

- Anri Matsumura (松村 杏里; born 1991), Japanese handball player
- Ayako Matsumura (松村 亜矢子; born 1982), Japanese synchronized swimmer
- Chiaki Matsumura (松村 千秋; born 1992), Japanese curler
- Matsumura Goshun (松村 呉春; 1752–1811), Japanese painter
- Jinzō Matsumura (松村 任三; 1856–1928), Japanese botanist
- Hideyuki Matsumura (松村 英之; 1930–1995), Japanese mathematician
- Hokuto Matsumura (松村 北斗; born 1995), Japanese singer and actor
- Katsumi Matsumura (松村 勝美; born 1944), Japanese volleyball player
- Katsuya Matsumura (松村 克弥; born 1963), Japanese film director and screenwriter
- Kunihiro Matsumura (松村 邦洋; born 1967), Japanese comedian
- Michio Matsumura (松村 道央; born 1983), Japanese golfer
- Mitsuru Matsumura (松村 充; born 1957), Japanese figure skater and coach
- Motoharu Matsumura (松村 元治; born 1946), Japanese cross-country skier
- Nabe Matsumura (松村 ナビ; 1860–1930), Japanese karateka
- Ryo Matsumura (松村 亮; born 1994), Japanese footballer
- Ryuji Matsumura (松村 龍二; 1938–2025), Japanese politician
- Sayuri Matsumura (松村 沙友理; born 1992), Japanese singer and actress
- Shōnen Matsumura (松村 松年; 1872–1960), Japanese entomologist
- Matsumura Sōkon (松村 宗棍), Japanese karateka
- Suzuko Matsumura (松村 鈴子; born 1958), Japanese swimmer
- Teizo Matsumura (松村 禎三; 1929–2007), Japanese composer and poet
- Yoshifumi Matsumura (松村 祥史; born 1964), Japanese politician
- Yoshiko Matsumura (松村 好子; born 1941), Japanese volleyball player
- Yuki Matsumura (松村 雄基; born 1963), Japanese actor
- Yuta Matsumura (松村 雄太; born 1989), Japanese curler
- Yuta Matsumura (松村 優太; born 2001), Japanese professional footballer

== See also ==
- 9105 Matsumura, a main-belt asteroid
