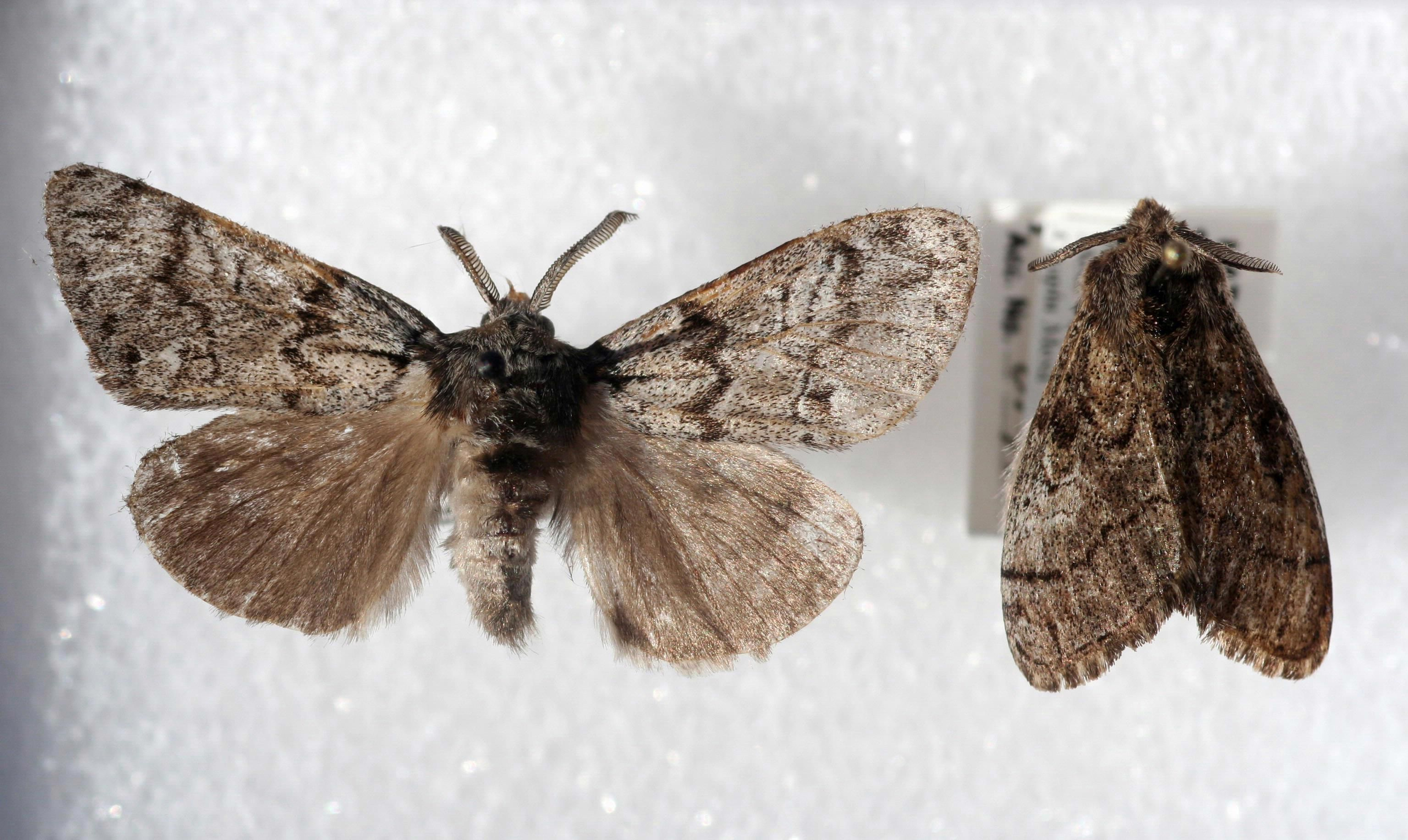

Scientific classification
- Kingdom: Animalia
- Phylum: Arthropoda
- Class: Insecta
- Order: Lepidoptera
- Superfamily: Noctuoidea
- Family: Erebidae
- Genus: Dasychira
- Species: D. grisefacta

Binomial name
- Dasychira grisefacta Dyar, 1911

= Dasychira grisefacta =

Species of moth

Dasychira grisefacta, the pine tussock or grizzled tussock, is a moth of the family Erebidae. The species was first described by Harrison Gray Dyar Jr. in 1911. It is found in North America in Alberta, from British Columbia to Arizona and Oregon, in New Mexico, Montana, South Dakota and North Dakota.

The wingspan is about 42 mm for males, the females are wingless.

The larvae feed on Pseudotsuga menziesii, Tsuga heterophylla, Picea engelmannii, Picea glauca, Pinus ponderosa and Pinus edulis.

== Subspecies ==
There are two recognized subspecies:

- Dasychira grisefacta grisefacta (Dyar, 1911)
- Dasychira grisefacta ella (Bryk, 1934)
