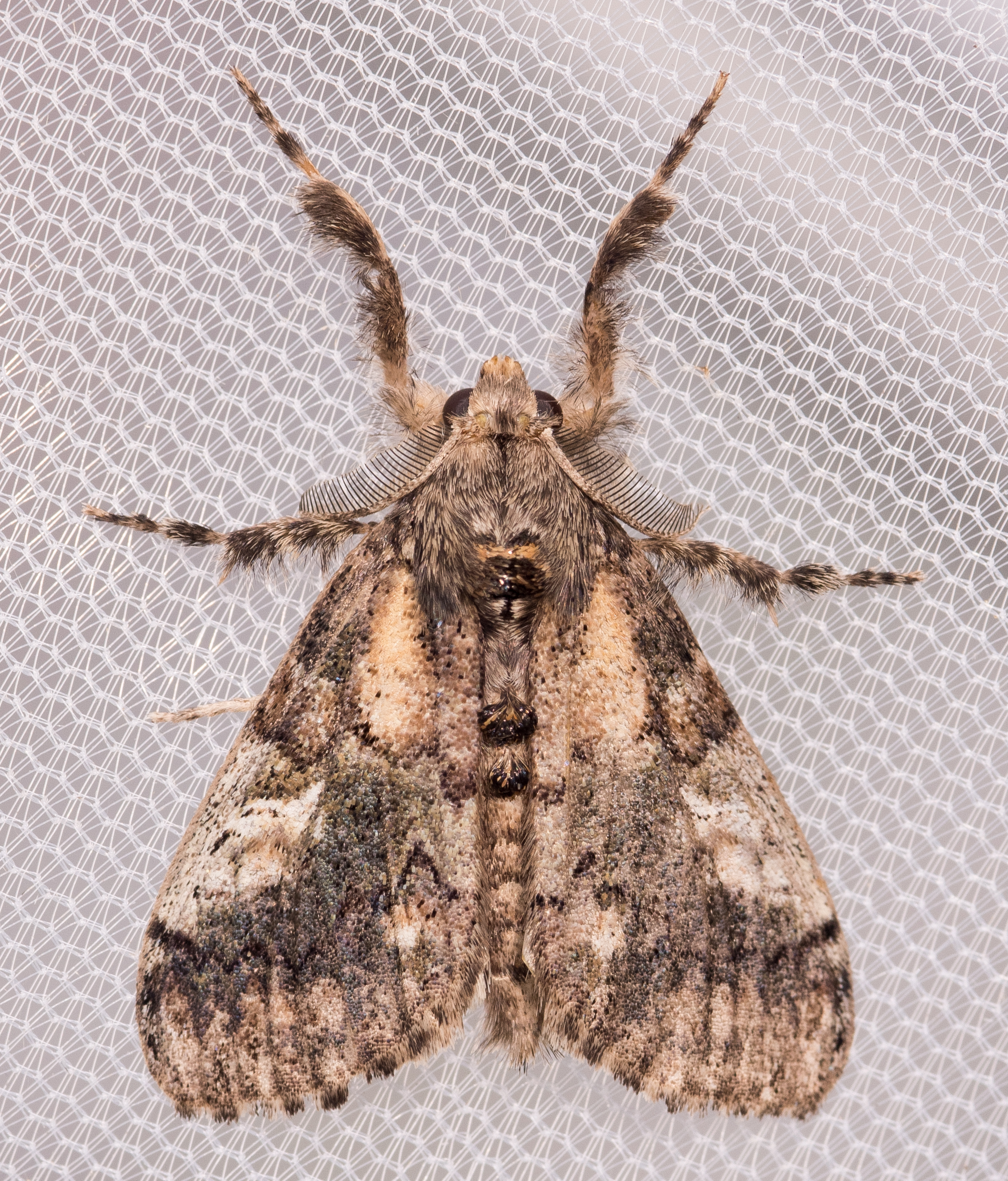

Scientific classification
- Kingdom: Animalia
- Phylum: Arthropoda
- Class: Insecta
- Order: Lepidoptera
- Superfamily: Noctuoidea
- Family: Erebidae
- Genus: Dasychira
- Species: D. plagiata

Binomial name
- Dasychira plagiata Walker, 1865

= Dasychira plagiata =

Species of moth

Dasychira plagiata, the northern pine tussock or northern conifer tussock, is a moth of the family Erebidae. The species was first described by Francis Walker in 1865. It is found in North America from Newfoundland and Labrador to Alberta, in Massachusetts, New York and North Carolina.

The wingspan is about 35 mm. The moths are on wing from June to August depending on the location.

The larvae feed on Picea glauca, Picea mariana, Picea rubens, Abies balsamea, Abies fraseri, Tsuga canadensis, Pinus and Larix species.
