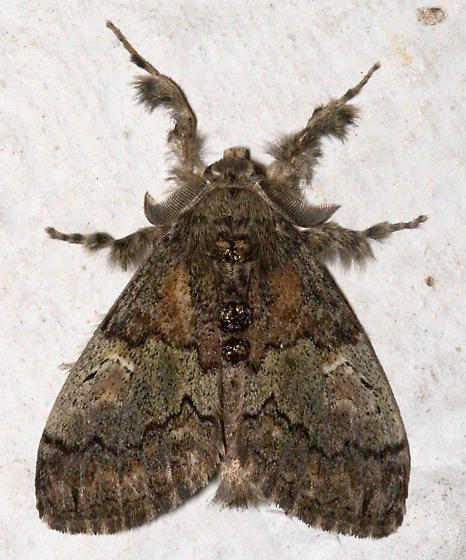

Scientific classification
- Kingdom: Animalia
- Phylum: Arthropoda
- Clade: Pancrustacea
- Class: Insecta
- Order: Lepidoptera
- Superfamily: Noctuoidea
- Family: Erebidae
- Genus: Dasychira
- Species: D. basiflava

Binomial name
- Dasychira basiflava (Packard, [1865])

Synonyms
- Parorgyia basiflava Packard, [1865]; Parorgyia clintoni Grote & Robinson, 1866

= Dasychira basiflava =

Yellow-based tussock

Species of moth

Dasychira basiflava, the yellow-based tussock, is a moth of the family Erebidae. The species was first described by Alpheus Spring Packard in 1865. It is found in North America from Massachusetts and southern Ontario west to Iowa, Texas, south to South Carolina and possibly Florida. It is also found in Southeastern Alaska.

The wingspan is 30–39 mm for males and 42–54 mm for females. Adults are on wing from June to August in the north and earlier in spring in the south. There is one generation in most of the range, but a second generation can occur in the southern part of the range.

The larvae feed on oak, dogwood and blueberry.
