= Dasychira dorsipennata =

Scientific classification
- Kingdom: Animalia
- Phylum: Arthropoda
- Clade: Pancrustacea
- Class: Insecta
- Order: Lepidoptera
- Superfamily: Noctuoidea
- Family: Erebidae
- Genus: Dasychira
- Species: D. dorsipennata

Binomial name
- Dasychira dorsipennata (Barnes & McDunnough, 1919)

Species of moth

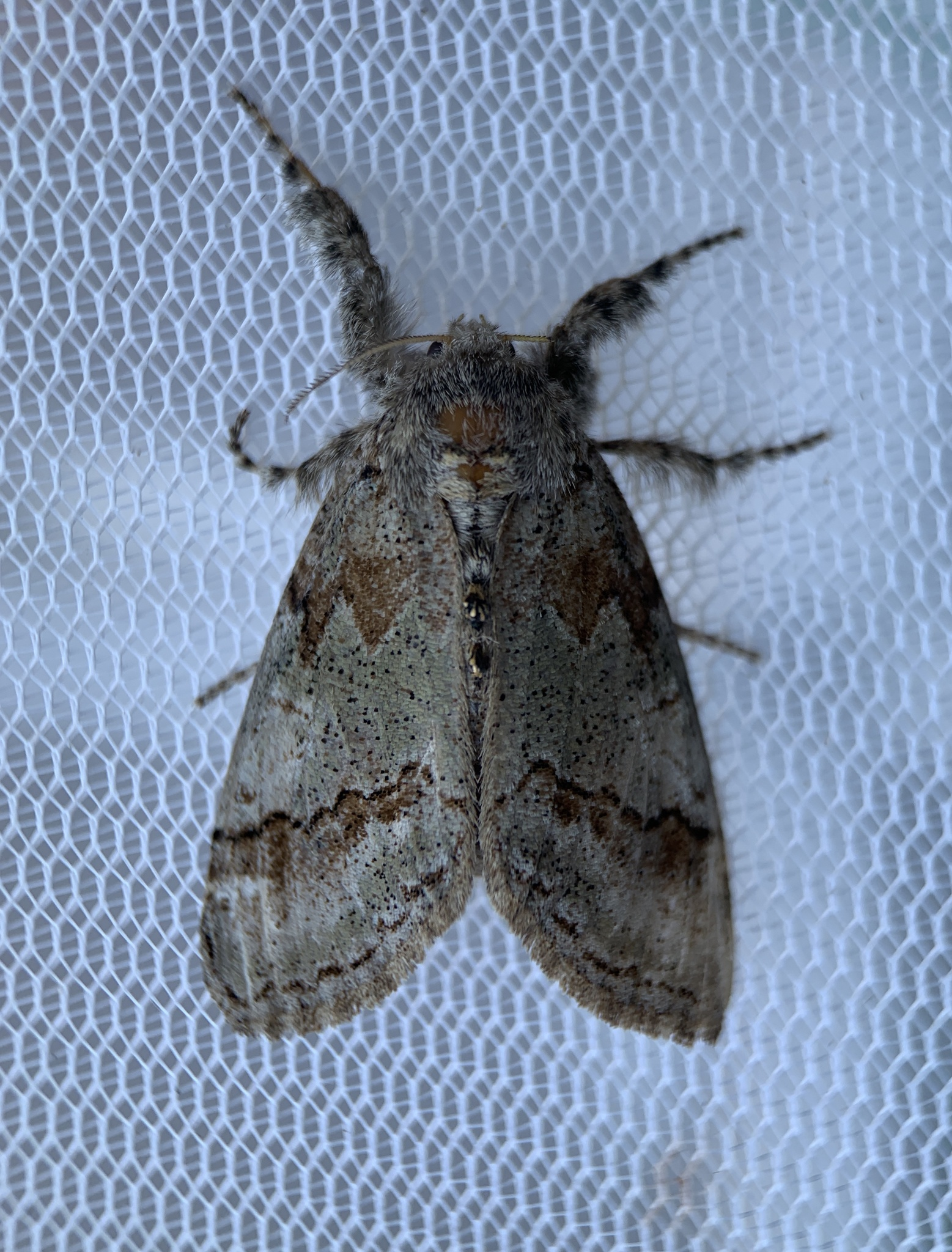
Dasychira dorsipennata in New Hampshire, USA

Dasychira dorsipennata, the sharp-lined tussock or hardwood tussock moth, is a species of tussock moth in the family Erebidae. It was first described by William Barnes and James Halliday McDunnough in 1919 and it is found in North America.

The MONA or Hodges number for Dasychira dorsipennata is 8293.
