= Calliteara albibasalis =

Scientific classification
- Kingdom: Animalia
- Phylum: Arthropoda
- Class: Insecta
- Order: Lepidoptera
- Superfamily: Noctuoidea
- Family: Erebidae
- Genus: Calliteara
- Species: C. albibasalis

Binomial name
- Calliteara albibasalis (Holland, 1893)

Synonyms
- Ilema albibasalis Holland, 1893; Dasychira albibasalis

Species of moth

Calliteara albibasalis is a moth of the family Erebidae first described by William Jacob Holland in 1893. It is found in Gabon.
