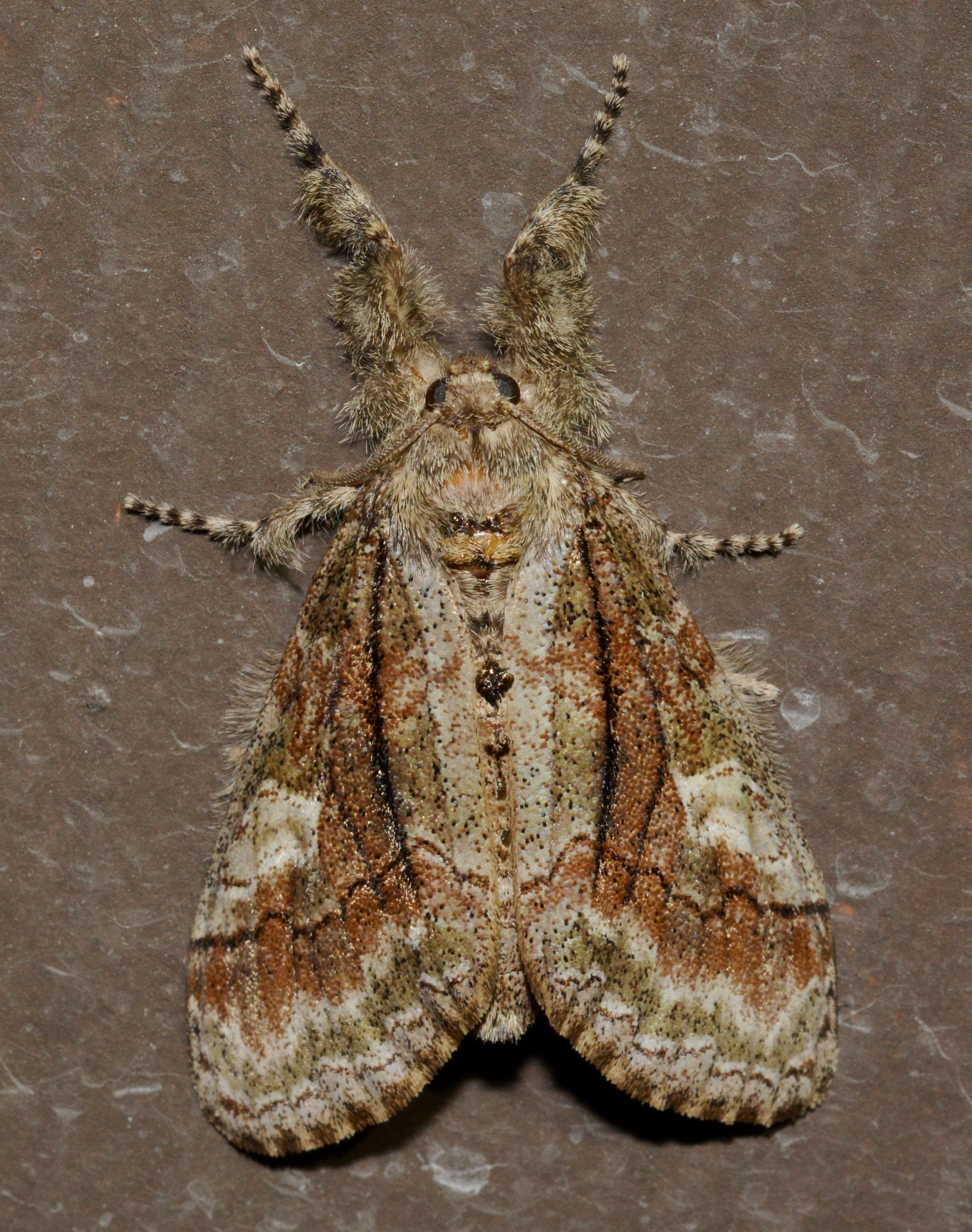

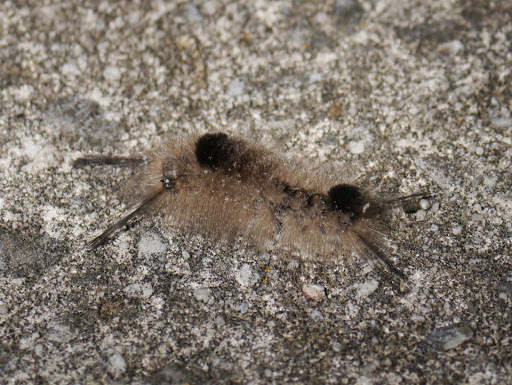
- Adult (top) and larva (bottom)

Scientific classification
- Kingdom: Animalia
- Phylum: Arthropoda
- Class: Insecta
- Order: Lepidoptera
- Superfamily: Noctuoidea
- Family: Erebidae
- Tribe: Orgyiini
- Genus: Dasychira
- Species: D. obliquata

Binomial name
- Dasychira obliquata (Grote & Robinson, 1866)

= Dasychira obliquata =

Species of moth

Dasychira obliquata, the streaked tussock moth, is a species of tussock moth in the family Erebidae. It is found in North America.
