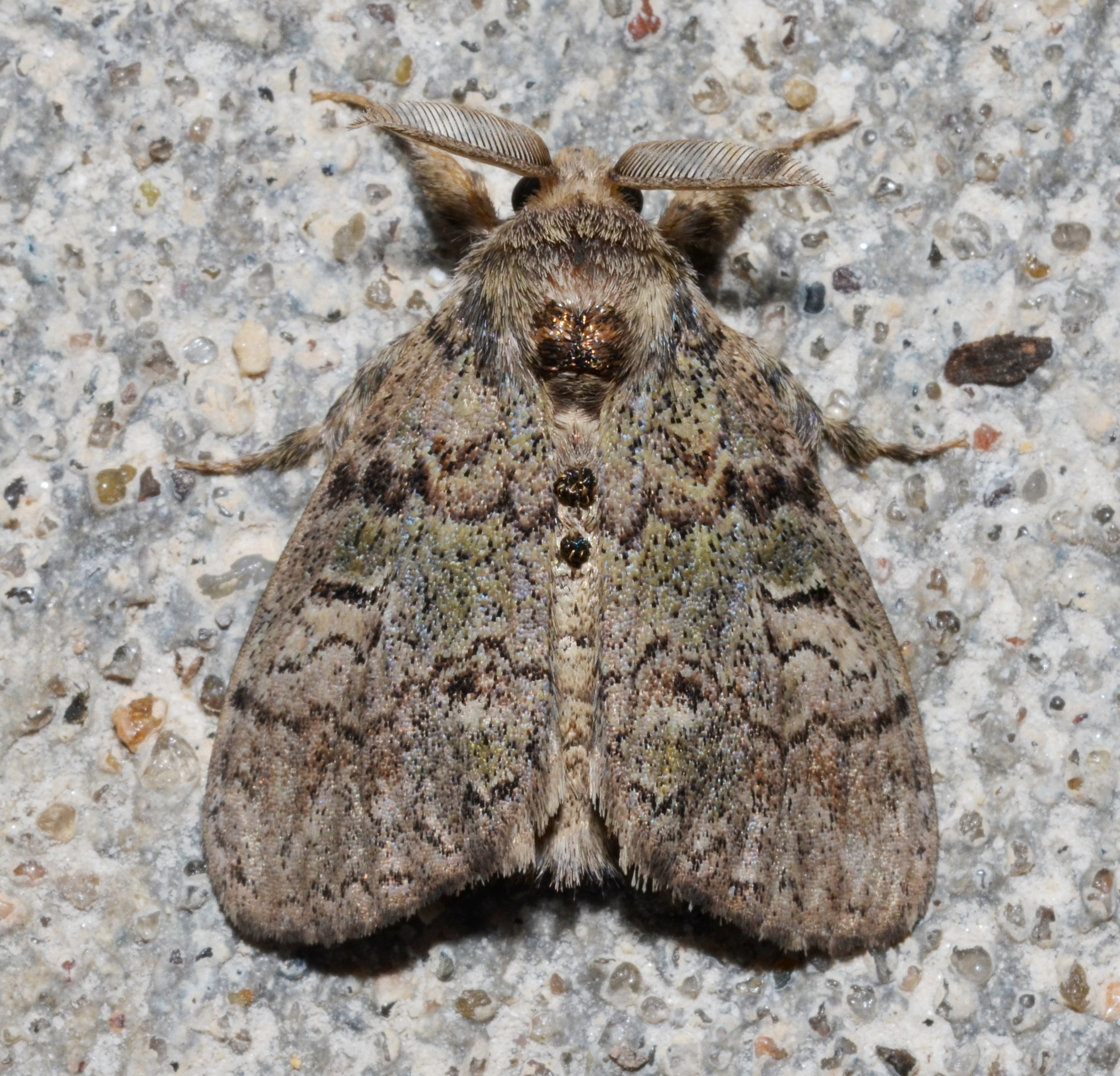

Scientific classification
- Domain: Eukaryota
- Kingdom: Animalia
- Phylum: Arthropoda
- Class: Insecta
- Order: Lepidoptera
- Superfamily: Noctuoidea
- Family: Erebidae
- Genus: Dasychira
- Species: D. vagans

Binomial name
- Dasychira vagans (Barnes & McDunnough, 1913)

Synonyms
- Olene vagans Barnes & McDunnough, 1913; Olene willingi Barnes & McDunnough, 1913; Olene vagans grisea Barnes & McDunnough, 1913

= Dasychira vagans =

Variable tussock moth

Species of moth

Dasychira vagans, the variable tussock moth, is a moth of the family Erebidae. It is found in North America, where it has been recorded from Newfoundland to southern British Columbia in the north and North Carolina and Utah in the west. The species was first described by William Barnes and James Halliday McDunnough in 1913.

The length of the forewings is 14–18 mm for males and 22–24 mm for females. Adults are on wing from June to August in one generation per year.

The larvae feed on a wide range of plants from Aceraceae, Betulaceae, Fagaceae, Salicaceae and Rosaceae, but favors Quercus species.

== Subspecies ==
- Dasychira vagans vagans (eastern Canada, north-eastern United States)
- Dasychira vagans grisea (Barnes & McDunnough, 1913) (from southern Manitoba to South Dakota and then to British Columbia and Oregon)
