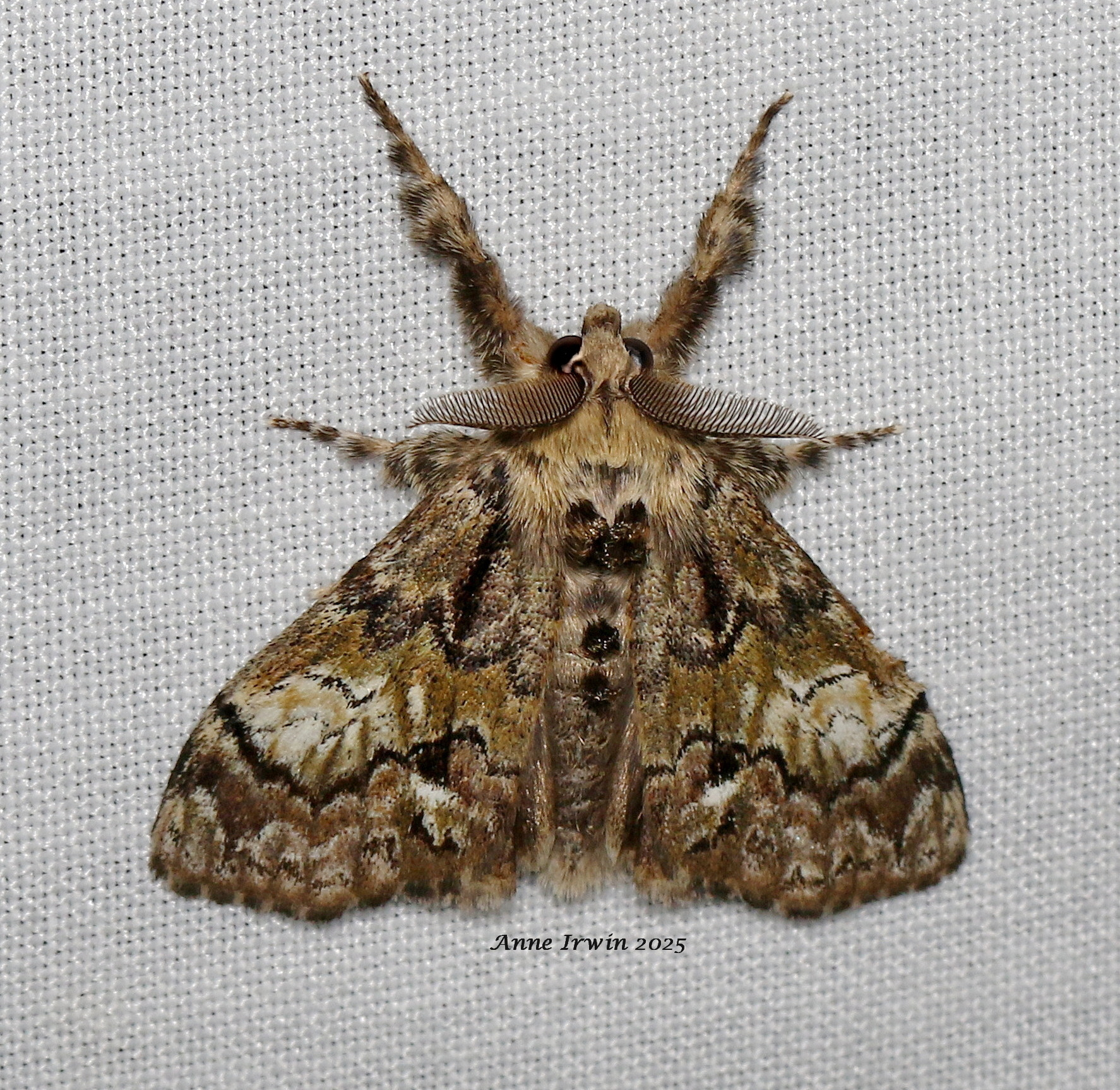

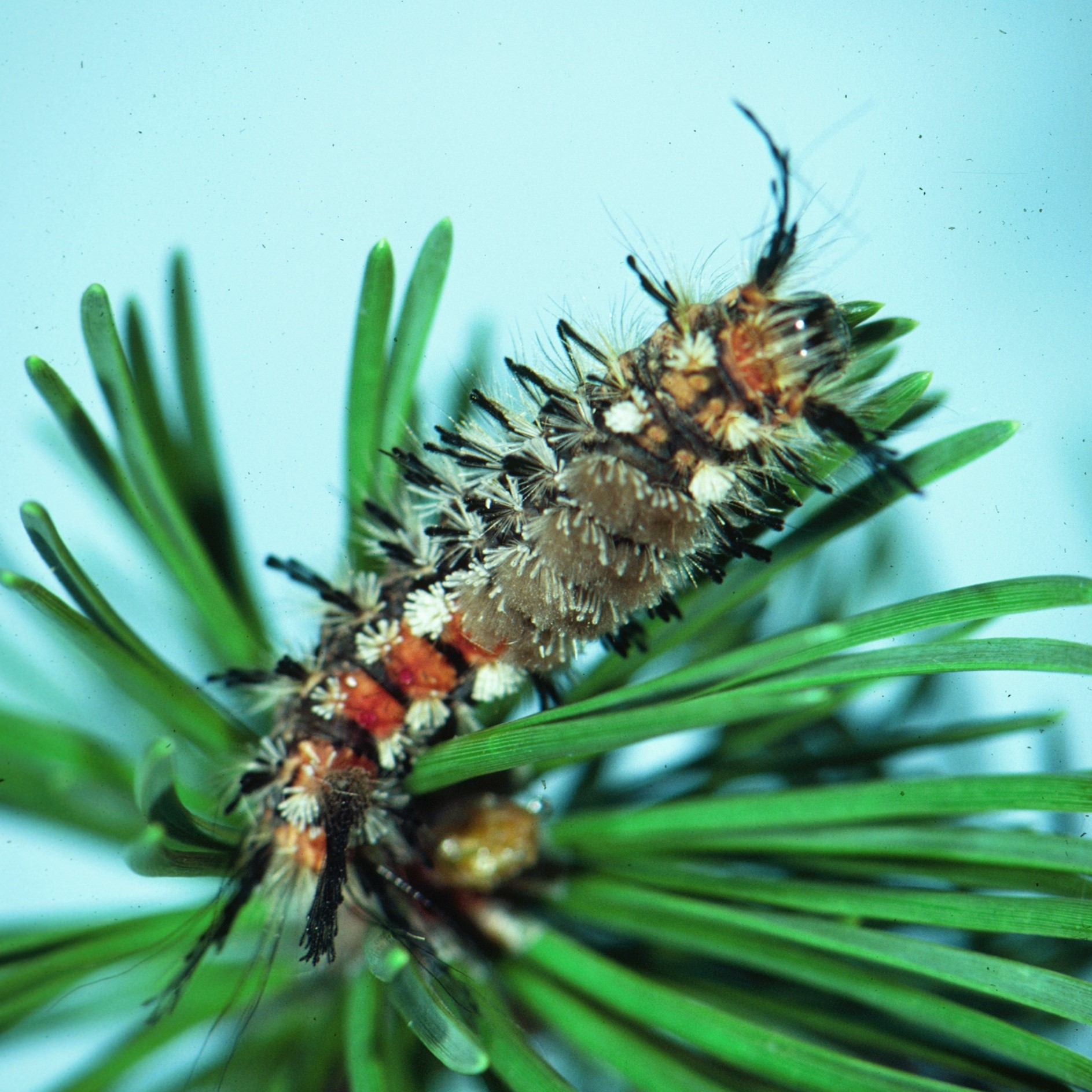
- Adult (top) and larva (bottom)

Scientific classification
- Kingdom: Animalia
- Phylum: Arthropoda
- Class: Insecta
- Order: Lepidoptera
- Superfamily: Noctuoidea
- Family: Erebidae
- Genus: Dasychira
- Species: D. pinicola

Binomial name
- Dasychira pinicola Dyar, 1911

= Dasychira pinicola =

Pine tussock moth

Species of moth

Dasychira pinicola, the pine tussock moth, is a species of moth in the family Erebidae. It was first described by Harrison Gray Dyar Jr. in 1911 and is found in the eastern US.

The larvae feed on Pinus species, including Pinus banksiana.
