= Jan Kochanowski University =

University in Kielce, Poland

Jan Kochanowski University in Kielce
- Uniwersytet Jana Kochanowskiego w Kielcach
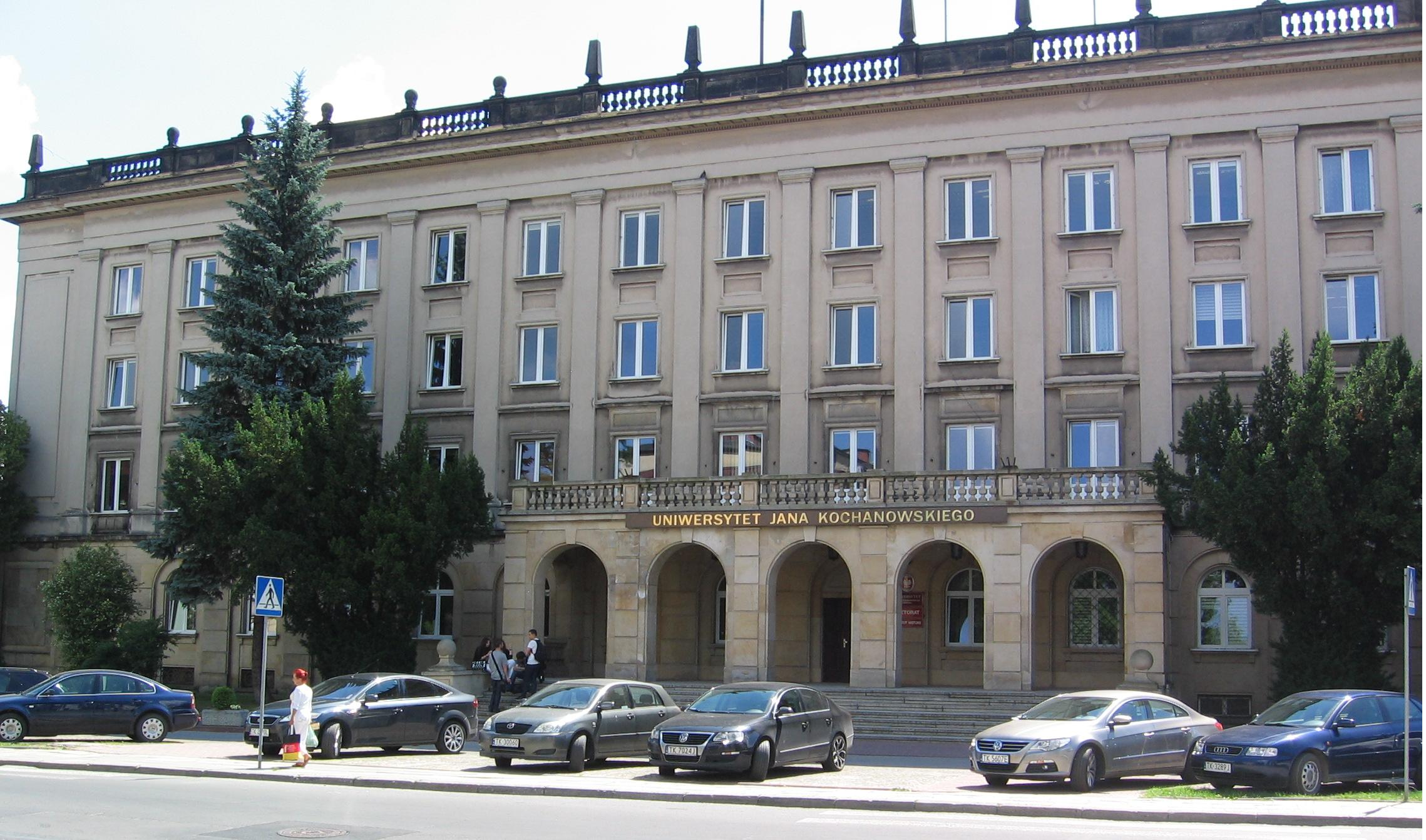
- Latin: Universitas Ioannis Kochanowskiensis Kielcensis
- Type: Public
- Established: 19 June 1969
- Affiliations: Socrates-Erasmus
- Rector: prof. dr hab. Beata Wojciechowska
- Administrative staff: 1,774
- Students: 9,223 (12.2023)
- Location: ul. St. Żeromskiego 5, Kielce 25-369, Poland., Kielce, Poland; 50°51′59″N 20°38′13″E
- Campus: Urban
- Website: www.ujk.edu.pl

Jan Kochanowski University in Kielce (Polish: Uniwersytet Jana Kochanowskiego w Kielcach), formerly Holy Cross Academy (Polish: Akademia Świętokrzyska) and Jan Kochanowski University of Humanities and Sciences (Polish: Uniwersytet Humanistyczno-Przyrodniczy Jana Kochanowskiego w Kielcach), is a public university in Kielce, Holy Cross Province. It is named after Jan Kochanowski and was established in 1945, dating its tradition to an educational institution specialising in pedagogy.

== Gallery ==
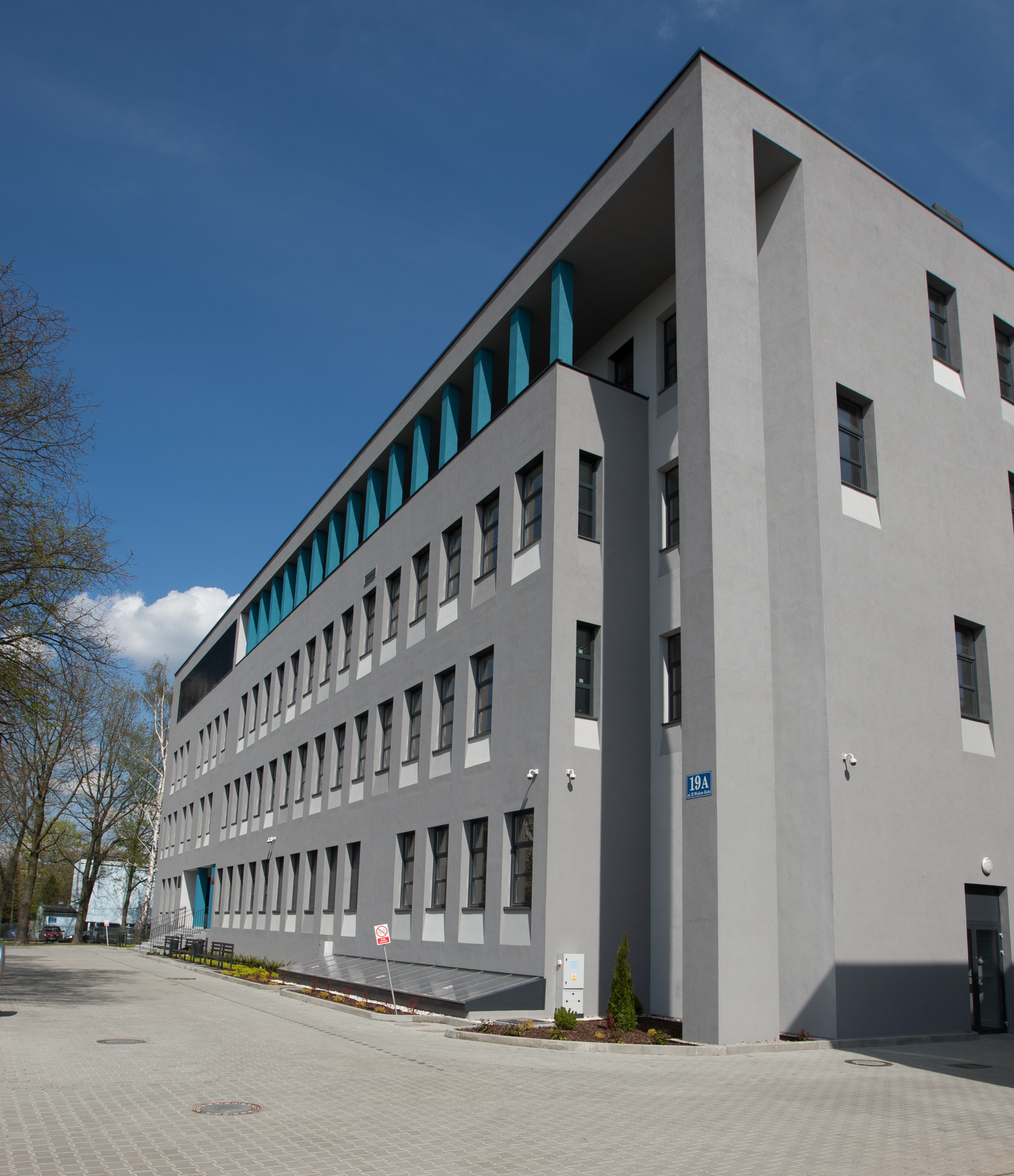
Health and Sciences Faculty

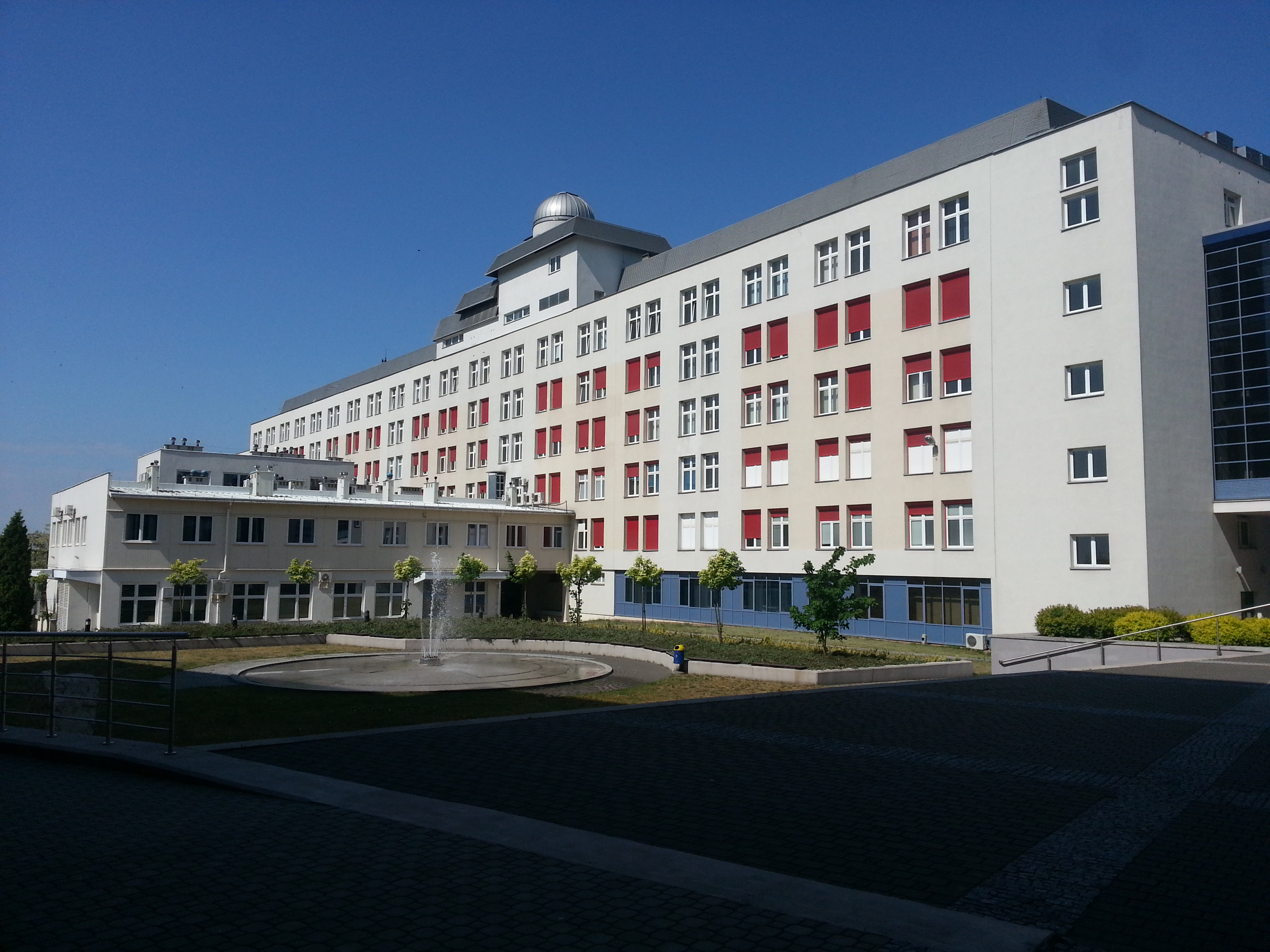
Faculty of Mathematics and Natural Sciences

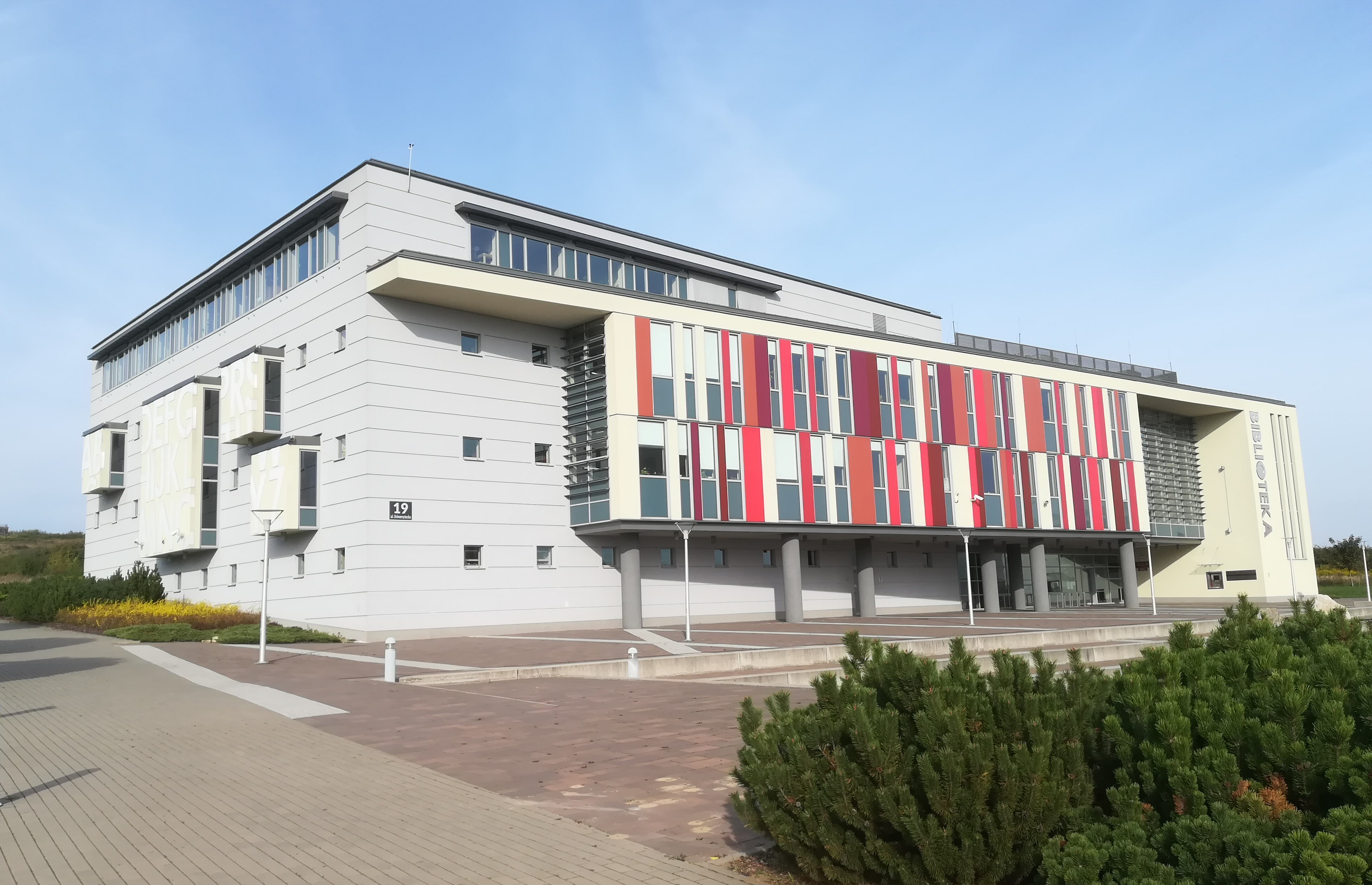
University Library
