= List of lymantriid genera: P =

The large moth subfamily Lymantriinae contains the following genera beginning with P:

- Pantana
- Papuaroa
- Paqueta
- Parabatella
- Parakanchia
- Paramarbla
- Parapellucens
- Parapirga
- Paraporthesia
- Paraproctis
- Paraxena
- Parocneria
- Parvaroa
- Pegella
- Pellucens
- Pendria
- Penthophera
- Perina
- Phreata
- Pida
- Pirga
- Pirgula
- Porthesaroa
- Porthmeia
- Psalis
- Pseudobazisa
- Pseudostracilla
- Psilochira
- Pteredoa
- Pyrrhopteryx
