= List of lymantriid genera: S =

The large moth subfamily Lymantriinae contains the following genera beginning with S:

- Salvatgea
- Sarsina
- Scaphocera
- Sevastopuloa
- Sirana
- Somatoxena
- Somena
- Soreutoneura
- Sphrageidus
- Sphragista
- Staetherinia
- Stenaroa
- Stilpnaroma
- Stracena
- Stracilla
- Sundaroa
- Sychnacedes
- Synogdoa
