= List of lymantriid genera: C =

The large moth subfamily Lymantriinae contains the following genera beginning with C:

- Cadorela
- Cadurca
- Caelicola
- Calliteara
- Casama
- Caviria
- Choerotricha
- Chrysocyma
- Cifuna
- Cimola
- Cispia
- Clethrogyna
- Conigephyra
- Cozola
- Creagra
- Cropera
- Croperoides
- Crorema
- Croremopsis
