= List of lymantriid genera: O =

The large moth subfamily Lymantriinae contains the following genera beginning with O:

- Ocneria
- Ocnerogyia
- Ogoa
- Olapa
- Olene
- Oligeria
- Opoboa
- Orana
- Orgyia
- Orithrepta
- Orvasca
- Otroeda
