= List of lymantriid genera: T =

The large moth subfamily Lymantriinae contains the following genera beginning with T:

- Takashachia
- Teia
- Telochurus
- Terphothrix
- Thagona
- Thambeta
- Theriophila
- Toxoproctis
- Turlina
