= List of lymantriid genera: B =

The large moth subfamily Lymantriinae contains the following genera beginning with B:

- Barlowia
- Barobata
- Batella
- Belinda
- Bembina
- Bifurca
- Birnara
- Blazia
- Bracharoa
