= Suarezia =

Suarezia may refer to:

- Suarezia (plant) Dodson, a genus of orchids
- Suarezia (crustacean) Budde-Lund, 1904, a genus of isopod crustaceans
- Suarezia Théry, 1912, now Suarezina Théry, 1936, a genus of buprestid beetles
- Suarezia Hering, 1926, now Salvatgea Griveaud, 1977, a genus of lymantriid moths
