= List of lymantriid genera: I =

The large moth subfamily Lymantriinae contains the following genera beginning with I:

- Icta
- Ilema
- Imaus
- Iropoca
- Ivela
