= List of lymantriid genera: K =

The large moth subfamily Lymantriinae contains the following genera beginning with K:

- Kidokuga
- Kintana
- Kunusara
- Kuromondokuga
