= Orana =

Orana may refer to:

== Fauna ==
- Orana (moth), a genus of moths in the subfamily Lymantriinae
- Orana, common name of Astacoides petiti, a crayfish of the family Parastacidae

== Places ==
=== Australia ===
- Orana (New South Wales), a region
- Orana, Western Australia, a suburb of Albany
- Campbelltown Stadium, Campbelltown, New South Wales, formerly known as Orana Park

=== New Zealand ===
- Orana Wildlife Park, New Zealand's only open-range zoo

== Other uses ==
- Fortesa Orana (born 1996), Kosovan karateka
- Orana School, a Steinerist school in Canberra, Australian Capital Territory
- Orana (comics), a fictional character appearing in Wonder Woman comics and the DC Universe
- Orana Credit Union, which was merged into Regional Australia Bank in 2008

== See also ==
- Adoxophyes orana, the summer fruit tortrix, a moth of the family Tortricidae
- Hadronyche orana, a species of funnel-web spider in the Atracidae family
- Zygaena orana, a species of moth in the family Zygaenidae
- Oranda (disambiguation)
