= Polymona =

Scientific classification
- Kingdom: Animalia
- Phylum: Arthropoda
- Class: Insecta
- Order: Lepidoptera
- Superfamily: Noctuoidea
- Family: Erebidae
- Tribe: Lymantriini
- Genus: Polymona; Walker, 1855

Synonyms
- Oreinobia Wallengren, 1865

Genus of moths

Polymona is a genus of moths in the family Erebidae. The genus was erected by Francis Walker in 1855.

== Species ==
- Polymona finitorum (Collenette, 1931)
- Polymona hemipyra (Collenette, 1932)
- Polymona inaffinis Hering, 1926
- Polymona philbyi (Collenette, 1933)
- Polymona rubescens Rebel, 1948
- Polymona rufifemur Walker, 1855
- Polymona whitei Wiltshire, 1980
- Polymona wiltshirei Hacker, 2016
