= Incertae sedis (Lymantriinae) =

Scientific classification
- Kingdom: Animalia
- Phylum: Arthropoda
- Clade: Pancrustacea
- Class: Insecta
- Order: Lepidoptera
- Superfamily: Noctuoidea
- Family: Erebidae
- Subfamily: Lymantriinae
- Tribe: Incertae sedis

List of moth genera

Several genera of tussock moths in the family Erebidae are placed in incertae sedis (of uncertain position) because their relationships to tribes within the subfamily Lymantriinae are unclear.

== Genera ==
The following genera of the Lymantriinae are not assigned to a tribe. This list may be incomplete.

- Birnara
- Parapellucens
- Parvaroa
- Pseudarctia
- Tamsita
