= Carpenterella =

Carpenterella may refer to:

- Carpenterella (fungus), a fungus genus in the family Synchytriaceae
- Carpenterella (moth), an insect genus in the subfamily Lymantriinae
