= ICTA =

Icta is a genus of moths.

ICTA may refer to:

- Imperial College of Tropical Agriculture, a college in Trinidad, now the St Augustine Campus of the University of the West Indies
- Income and Corporation Taxes Act 1988, a United Kingdom act of Parliament
- Independent Television Companies Association, a former organisation in the United Kingdom
- Information and Communication Technology Agency of Sri Lanka
- Information and Communication Technologies Authority (Mauritius)
- Information and Communication Technologies Authority (Turkey)
- Information and Communication Technology Authority (Cayman Islands)
- Information and Communication Technology Authority (Kenya)
- Integrated Circuit Topography Act, a Canadian intellectual property statute
- International Center for Technology Assessment

== See also ==
- Iqta', a mediaeval tax practice
