= Somatoxena =

Scientific classification
- Domain: Eukaryota
- Kingdom: Animalia
- Phylum: Arthropoda
- Class: Insecta
- Order: Lepidoptera
- Superfamily: Noctuoidea
- Family: Erebidae
- Tribe: Lymantriini
- Genus: Somatoxena; Aurivillius, 1904
- Species: S. lasea

Binomial name
- Somatoxena lasea (H. Druce, 1899)

Synonyms
- Xenosoma lasea H. Druce, 1899

Genus of moths

Somatoxena is a monotypic moth genus in the subfamily Lymantriinae erected by Per Olof Christopher Aurivillius in 1904. Its only species, Somatoxena lasea, was first described by Herbert Druce in 1899. It is found in Sierra Leone.
