= Parocneria =

Scientific classification
- Kingdom: Animalia
- Phylum: Arthropoda
- Class: Insecta
- Order: Lepidoptera
- Superfamily: Noctuoidea
- Family: Erebidae
- Tribe: Lymantriini
- Genus: Parocneria; Dyar, 1897

Synonyms
- Uliolepis Warren, 1897; Maimaia Matsumura, 1933; Daniela Hartig, 1963; Pseudolabis Hartig, 1963

Genus of moths

Parocneria is a genus of tussock moths in the family Erebidae. The genus was erected by Harrison Gray Dyar Jr. in 1897.

== Species ==
The following species are included in the genus:

- Parocneria algerica Oberthür, 1916
- Parocneria audeoudi (Brandt, 1938) Iran
- Parocneria detrita (Esper, 1785) central and southern Europe, Spain, Portugal, southern Russia
- Parocneria furva (Leech, [1889]) Japan, Korea, China
- Parocneria insolita Brandt, 1938
- Parocneria iranica (Brandt, 1938) Iran
- Parocneria ledereri (Millière, 1869) Italy, Sicily, Balkans
- Parocneria militaris Oberthür, 1914
- Parocneria nigriplagiata (Gaede, 1932)
- Parocneria nisseni (Rothschild, 1912) Algeria
- Parocneria nora (Staudinger, 1900)
- Parocneria orientalis Schwingenschuss?, 1939
- Parocneria orientis Daniel, 1963
- Parocneria philbyi (Collenette, 1933) Arabia
- Parocneria pilosa Warren, 1897
- Parocneria poenitens Staudinger, 1900
- Parocneria raddei Christoph, 1885) Transcaucasia
- Parocneria samarita (Staudinger, 1896) Palestine
- Parocneria signatoria (Christoph, 1893) northern Africa, Palestine, Turkey, Syria, Iraq, Iran, Afghanistan, Turkestan, Transcaspia
- Parocneria stoetzneri Draeseke, 1926
- Parocneria terebinthi (Freyer, 1838) Balkans, Asia Minor, Caucasus, Mesopotamia
- Parocneria terebynthina (Staudinger, [1895]) Mesopotamia
- Parocneria tolgi (Rebel, 1917)
- Parocneria unicolor Staudinger, 1895
- Parocneria unicoloris Brandt, 1938
- Parocneria vestalina Staudinger, 1895
