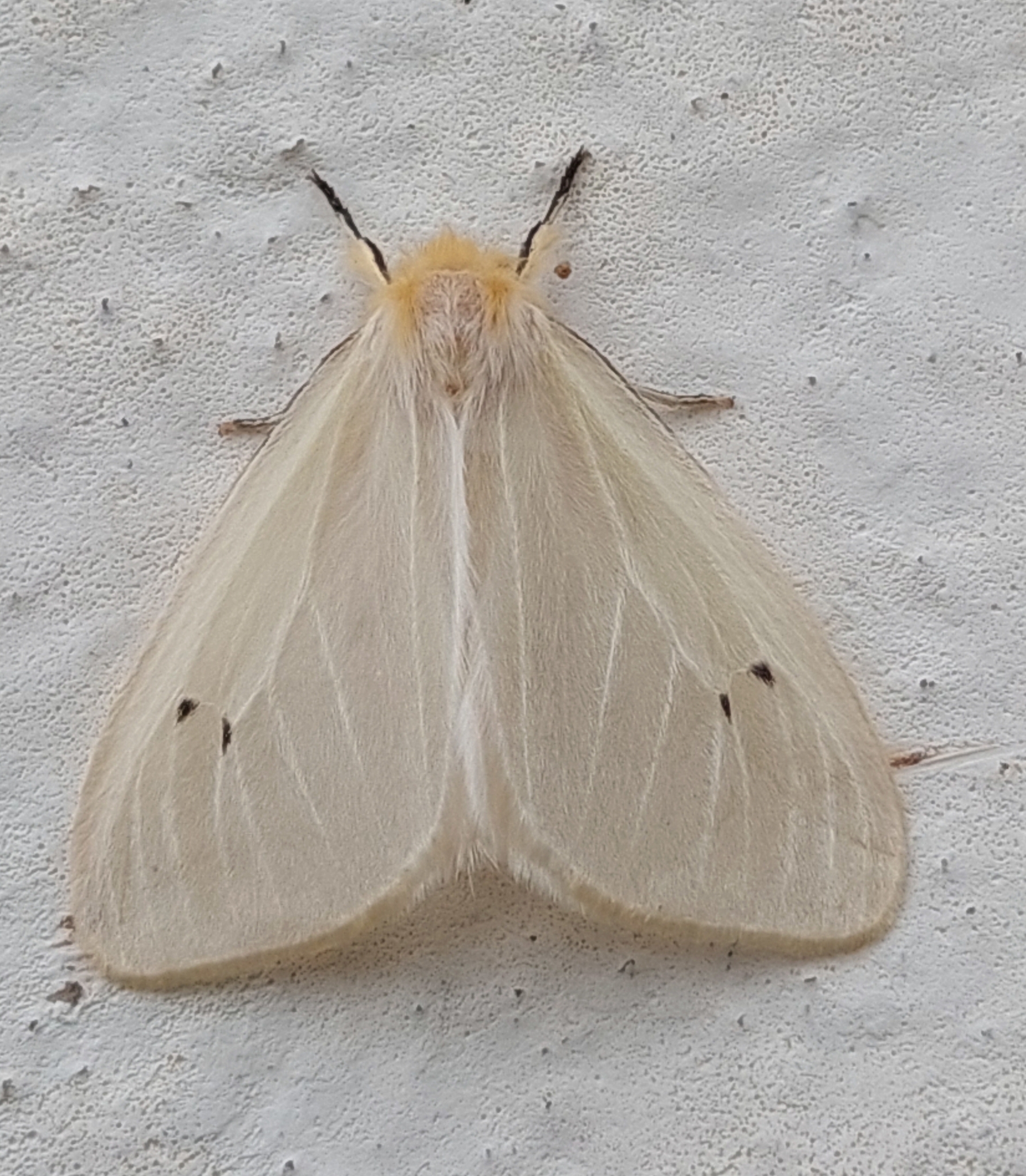

Scientific classification
- Domain: Eukaryota
- Kingdom: Animalia
- Phylum: Arthropoda
- Class: Insecta
- Order: Lepidoptera
- Superfamily: Noctuoidea
- Family: Erebidae
- Genus: Olapa
- Species: O. tavetensis

Binomial name
- Olapa tavetensis (Holland, 1892)

Synonyms
- Antiphella telesilla Druce, 1899; Leucoma tavetensis Holland, 1892

= Olapa tavetensis =

Species of moth

Olapa tavetensis is a species of moth in the family Erebidae that was first described by William Jacob Holland in 1892.

== Distribution ==
It is found in sub-Saharan Africa (Burundi, Cameroon, Comoros, the Republic of the Congo, the Democratic Republic of the Congo, Kenya, Nigeria, South Africa, Sudan and Tanzania).

This species has a wingspan of 40 mm. The wings are white with two minute black spots at the end of the cells of the primaries.
