= Lymantica leucophaes =

Scientific classification
- Domain: Eukaryota
- Kingdom: Animalia
- Phylum: Arthropoda
- Class: Insecta
- Order: Lepidoptera
- Superfamily: Noctuoidea
- Family: Erebidae
- Genus: Lymantica
- Species: L. leucophaes

Binomial name
- Lymantica leucophaes Collenette, 1936

Synonyms
- Lymantria leucophaes Colette, 1936

Species of moth

Lymantica leucophaes is a moth of the family Erebidae. It is found in eastern Madagascar.

The forewings of this species are white, with 6 prominent russet patches along the costa and traces of 3 fasciae of russet. Hindwings are russet with whitish towards the base.

The expanse of the males is 38 mm.
