= Porthmeia =

Scientific classification
- Domain: Eukaryota
- Kingdom: Animalia
- Phylum: Arthropoda
- Class: Insecta
- Order: Lepidoptera
- Superfamily: Noctuoidea
- Family: Erebidae
- Tribe: Lymantriini
- Genus: Porthmeia; Bethune-Baker, 1908

Genus of moths

Porthmeia is a genus of moths in the subfamily Lymantriinae erected by George Thomas Bethune-Baker in 1908. They are native to the island of New Guinea.

== Species ==
- Porthmeia subnigra Bethune-Baker, 1908
- Porthmeia pyrozona Collenette, 1930
- Porthmeia bicolora Bethune-Baker, 1908
