= Stenaroa =

Scientific classification
- Kingdom: Animalia
- Phylum: Arthropoda
- Class: Insecta
- Order: Lepidoptera
- Superfamily: Noctuoidea
- Family: Erebidae
- Tribe: Lymantriini
- Genus: Stenaroa; Hampson, 1910

Synonyms
- Perinetia Collenette, 1936

Genus of moths

Stenaroa is a genus of moths in the subfamily Lymantriinae. The genus was erected by George Hampson in 1910.

== Species ==
Some species of this genus are:

- Stenaroa crocea Griveaud, 1977
- Stenaroa flavescens Griveaud, 1977
- Stenaroa ignepicta Hampson, 1910
- Stenaroa miniata (Kenrick, 1914) = Perinetia leucocloea Collenette, 1936
- Stenaroa rubriflava Griveaud, 1973
