= Turlina =

Scientific classification
- Kingdom: Animalia
- Phylum: Arthropoda
- Class: Insecta
- Order: Lepidoptera
- Superfamily: Noctuoidea
- Family: Erebidae
- Tribe: Lymantriini
- Genus: Turlina; Griveaud, 1976
- Species: T. punctata

Binomial name
- Turlina punctata Griveaud, 1976

Genus of moths

Turlina is a monotypic moth genus in the subfamily Lymantriinae. Its only species, Turlina punctata, is found on Madagascar. Both the genus and the species were first described by Paul Griveaud in 1976.
