= Oligeria =

Scientific classification
- Kingdom: Animalia
- Phylum: Arthropoda
- Class: Insecta
- Order: Lepidoptera
- Superfamily: Noctuoidea
- Family: Erebidae
- Tribe: Lymantriini
- Genus: Oligeria; Turner, 1921
- Species: O. hemicalla

Binomial name
- Oligeria hemicalla (Lower, 1905)

Synonyms
- Orgyia hemicalla Lower, 1905

Genus of moths

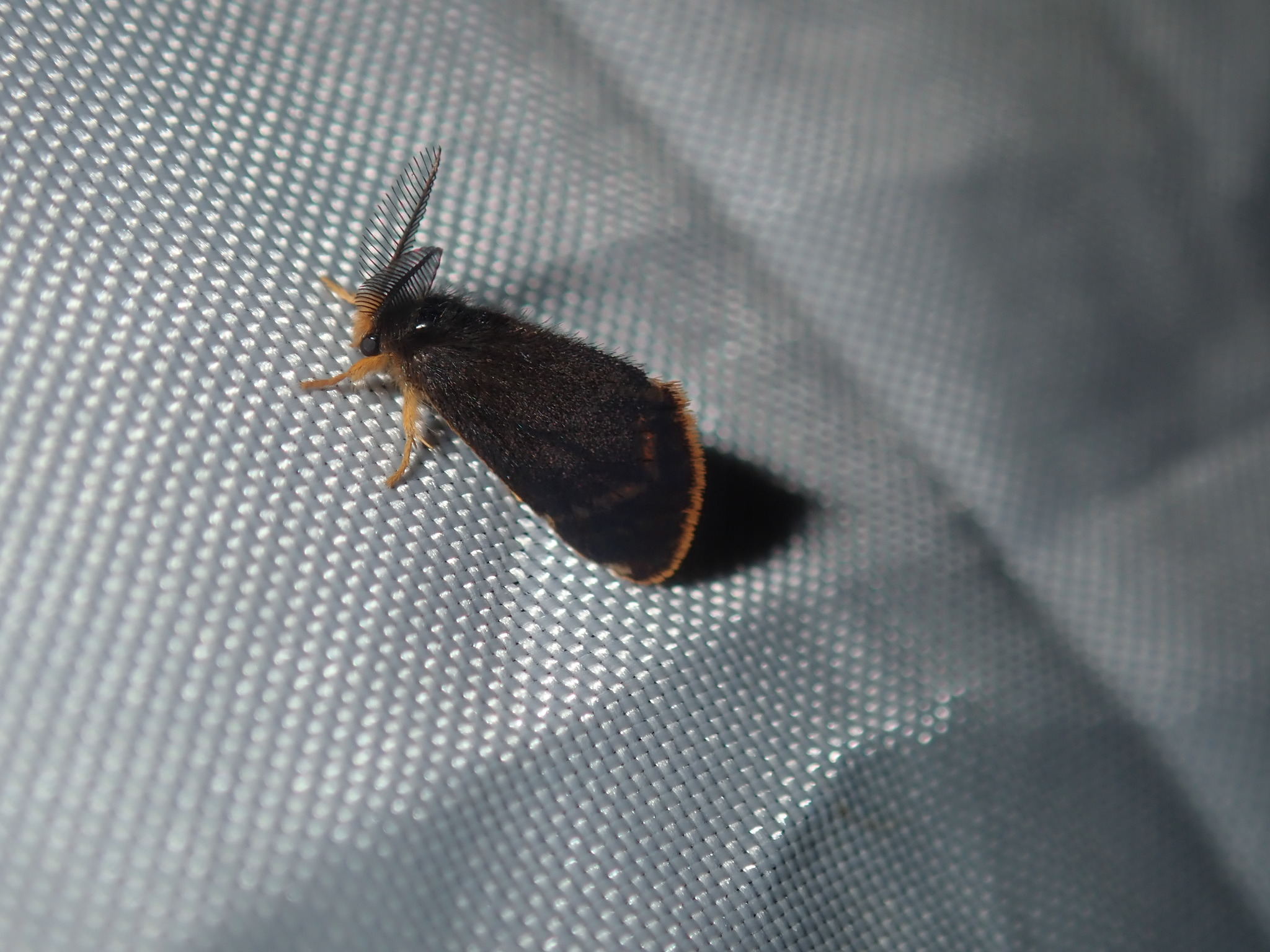
Oligeria hemicalla in Australia.

Oligeria is a monotypic moth genus in the subfamily Lymantriinae described by Turner in 1921. Its only species, Oligeria hemicalla, the tiny tussock moth, was first described by Oswald Bertram Lower in 1905. It is found in the Australian states of New South Wales and Victoria.
