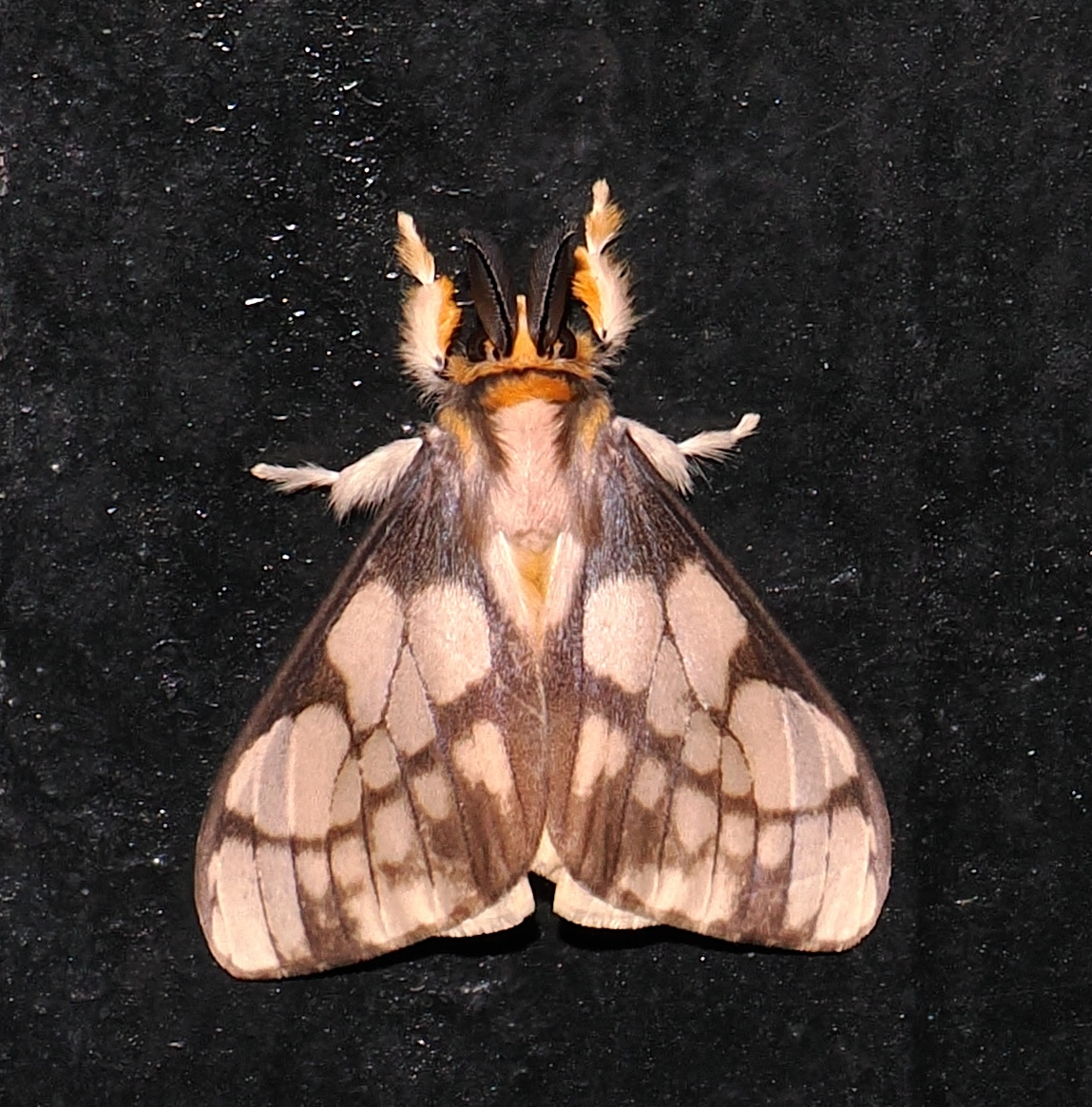
- Stracena bananae

Scientific classification
- Domain: Eukaryota
- Kingdom: Animalia
- Phylum: Arthropoda
- Class: Insecta
- Order: Lepidoptera
- Superfamily: Noctuoidea
- Family: Erebidae
- Tribe: Lymantriini
- Genus: Stracena; C. Swinhoe, 1903

Type species
- Stracena fuscivena C. Swinhoe, 1903

Synonyms
- Sapelia C. Swinhoe, 1903

= Stracena =

Genus of moths

Stracena is a genus of moths in the subfamily Lymantriinae. The genus was erected by Charles Swinhoe in 1903.

== Species ==
- Stracena aegrota Le Cerf, 1922
- Stracena bananae (Butler, [1897]) Malawi
- Stracena bananoides (Hering, 1927) Gabon
- Stracena barnsi (Collenette, 1930) Angola
- Stracena eximia (Holland, 1893) north-western Congo, western Africa
- Stracena flavescens (Aurivillius, 1925) western Africa
- Stracena flavipectus (C. Swinhoe, 1904) Nigeria
- Stracena fuscivena C. Swinhoe, 1903 Nigeria
- Stracena oloris (Hering, 1926)
- Stracena pellucida Grünberg, 1907
- Stracena promelaena (Holland, 1893) Gabon
- Stracena sulphureivena (Aurivillius, 1904) western Africa
- Stracena summisa (Hering, 1927) Kenya
