= Phreata =

Scientific classification
- Kingdom: Animalia
- Phylum: Arthropoda
- Class: Insecta
- Order: Lepidoptera
- Superfamily: Noctuoidea
- Family: Erebidae
- Tribe: Lymantriini
- Genus: Phreata; Walker, 1865

Genus of moths

Phreata is a genus of moths in the subfamily Lymantriinae. The genus was erected by Francis Walker in 1865.

== Species ==
- Phreata glaucoalba Walker, 1865 Bolivia
- Phreata subacta (Walker, 1855) Brazil (Rio de Janeiro)
