= Cadurca =

Scientific classification
- Domain: Eukaryota
- Kingdom: Animalia
- Phylum: Arthropoda
- Class: Insecta
- Order: Lepidoptera
- Superfamily: Noctuoidea
- Family: Erebidae
- Tribe: Lymantriini
- Genus: Cadurca; C. Swinhoe, 1906

Genus of moths

Cadurca is a genus of moths in the subfamily Lymantriinae. The genus was erected by Charles Swinhoe in 1906.

== Species ==
- Cadurca venata Swinhoe, 1906 Angola
- Cadurca moco Collenette, 1936 Angola
- Cadurca dianeura (Hering, 1928) Tanzania
