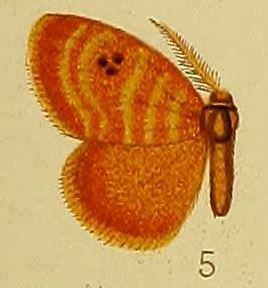
- Leptaroa fulvicolora

Scientific classification
- Kingdom: Animalia
- Phylum: Arthropoda
- Class: Insecta
- Order: Lepidoptera
- Superfamily: Noctuoidea
- Family: Erebidae
- Subfamily: Lymantriinae
- Genus: Leptaroa; Hampson, 1910

Type species
- Leptaroa fulvicolora Hampson, 1910

= Leptaroa =

Genus of moths

Leptaroa is a genus of moths in the subfamily Lymantriinae. The genus was erected by George Hampson in 1910.

Leptaroa is seen as a synonym of Chrysocyma Hampson, 1905 by The Global Lepidoptera Names Index and Lepidoptera and Some Other Life Forms. The list below comes from Afromoths.

== Species ==
- Leptaroa deleta Hering, 1926
- Leptaroa fulvicolora Camera Hampson, 1910
- Leptaroa jordani Hering, 1926
- Leptaroa ochricoloria Strand, 1911
- Leptaroa paupera Hering, 1926
