= Thambeta =

Scientific classification
- Domain: Eukaryota
- Kingdom: Animalia
- Phylum: Arthropoda
- Class: Insecta
- Order: Lepidoptera
- Superfamily: Noctuoidea
- Family: Erebidae
- Tribe: Lymantriini
- Genus: Thambeta; Collenette, 1953
- Species: T. haigi

Binomial name
- Thambeta haigi Collenette, 1953

Genus of moths

Thambeta is a monotypic moth genus in the subfamily Lymantriinae. Its only species, Thambeta haigi, is found in Nigeria. Both the genus and the species were first described by Cyril Leslie Collenette in 1953.
