= Pteredoa =

Scientific classification
- Kingdom: Animalia
- Phylum: Arthropoda
- Class: Insecta
- Order: Lepidoptera
- Superfamily: Noctuoidea
- Family: Erebidae
- Tribe: Lymantriini
- Genus: Pteredoa; Hampson, 1905

Genus of moths

Pteredoa is a genus of moths in the subfamily Lymantriinae. The genus was erected by George Hampson in 1905.

== Species ==
- Pteredoa atripalpia Hampson, 1910 Ethiopia
- Pteredoa crystalloides Collenette, 1936 Zaire
- Pteredoa fuscovenata (Wichgraf, 1922) eastern Africa
- Pteredoa monosticta (Butler, 1898) eastern Africa
- Pteredoa nigropuncta Hering, 1926 Cameroon
- Pteredoa plumosa Hampson, 1905 Zimbabwe
- Pteredoa siderea Hering, 1926 Kenya
- Pteredoa subapicalis Hering, 1926 Mozambique
- Pteredoa usebia (Swinhoe, 1903) Malawi, Mozambique, South Africa, Zambia, Zimbabwe
