= Paqueta =

Scientific classification
- Kingdom: Animalia
- Phylum: Arthropoda
- Class: Insecta
- Order: Lepidoptera
- Superfamily: Noctuoidea
- Family: Erebidae
- Tribe: Lymantriini
- Genus: Paqueta; Dall'Asta, 1981
- Species: P. sankuruensis

Binomial name
- Paqueta sankuruensis Dall'Asta, 1981

Genus of moths

Paqueta is a monotypic moth genus in the subfamily Lymantriinae. Its only species, Paqueta sankuruensis, is found in Zaire. Both the genus and the species were first described by Ugo Dall'Asta in 1981.
