= Pirga =

Scientific classification
- Domain: Eukaryota
- Kingdom: Animalia
- Phylum: Arthropoda
- Class: Insecta
- Order: Lepidoptera
- Superfamily: Noctuoidea
- Family: Erebidae
- Tribe: Lymantriini
- Genus: Pirga; Aurivillius, 1891

Genus of moths

Pirga is a genus of moths in the family Erebidae. The genus was erected by Per Olof Christopher Aurivillius in 1891.

== Species ==
- Pirga bipuncta Hering, 1926 eastern Africa
- Pirga cryptogena Collenette, 1931 Uganda
- Pirga loveni Aurivillius, 1922
- Pirga magna Swinhoe, 1903 eastern Africa
- Pirga mirabilis Aurivillius, 1891 Gabon
- Pirga mnemosyne Rebel, 1914 Congo
- Pirga pellucida Wichgraf, 1922
- Pirga transvalensis Janse, 1915 southern Africa
- Pirga ubangiana Schultze, 1934 north-western Congo
- Pirga weisei Karsch, 1900 eastern Africa
