= Blazia =

Scientific classification
- Domain: Eukaryota
- Kingdom: Animalia
- Phylum: Arthropoda
- Class: Insecta
- Order: Lepidoptera
- Superfamily: Noctuoidea
- Family: Erebidae
- Tribe: Lymantriini
- Genus: Blazia; Schaus in Seitz, 1927
- Species: B. lixivia

Binomial name
- Blazia lixivia (Dognin, 1923)

Genus of moths

Blazia is a monotypic moth genus in the subfamily Lymantriinae described by Schaus in 1927. Its only species, Blazia lixivia, was first described by Paul Dognin in 1923. It lives in Bolivia.
