= Madema =

Scientific classification
- Domain: Eukaryota
- Kingdom: Animalia
- Phylum: Arthropoda
- Class: Insecta
- Order: Lepidoptera
- Superfamily: Noctuoidea
- Family: Erebidae
- Tribe: Lymantriini
- Genus: Madema; Griveaud, 1977
- Species: M. viettei

Binomial name
- Madema viettei (Collenette, 1959)

Synonyms
- Crorema viettei Collenette, 1959

Genus of moths

Madema is a monotypic moth genus in the subfamily Lymantriinae erected by Paul Griveaud in 1977. Its only species, Madema viettei, was first described by Cyril Leslie Collenette in 1959. It is found on Madagascar.
