= Theriophila =

Scientific classification
- Domain: Eukaryota
- Kingdom: Animalia
- Phylum: Arthropoda
- Class: Insecta
- Order: Lepidoptera
- Superfamily: Noctuoidea
- Family: Erebidae
- Tribe: Lymantriini
- Genus: Theriophila; E. M. Hering, 1932
- Species: T. miara

Binomial name
- Theriophila miara E. M. Hering, 1932

Genus of moths

Theriophila is a monotypic moth genus in the subfamily Lymantriinae. Its only species, Theriophila miara, is found in Cameroon. Both the genus and the species were first described by Erich Martin Hering in 1932.
