= Bifurca =

Scientific classification
- Domain: Eukaryota
- Kingdom: Animalia
- Phylum: Arthropoda
- Class: Insecta
- Order: Lepidoptera
- Superfamily: Noctuoidea
- Family: Erebidae
- Tribe: Lymantriini
- Genus: Bifurca de Joannis, 1929
- Species: B. longinasus

Binomial name
- Bifurca longinasus de Joannis, 1929

Genus of moths

Bifurca is a monotypic moth genus in the subfamily Lymantriinae. Its only species, Bifurca longinasus, is found in Vietnam. Both the genus and the species were first described by Joseph de Joannis in 1929.
