= Porthesaroa brunea =

Scientific classification
- Domain: Eukaryota
- Kingdom: Animalia
- Phylum: Arthropoda
- Class: Insecta
- Order: Lepidoptera
- Superfamily: Noctuoidea
- Family: Erebidae
- Genus: Porthesaroa
- Species: P. brunea

Binomial name
- Porthesaroa brunea Griveaud, 1973

Species of moth

Porthesaroa brunea is a moth of the subfamily Lymantriinae. It is found in central Madagascar.

The males of this species have a wingspan of 20–24 mm. The head, front and palpa are yellow, antennae brownish and pectinated. Forewings are dark brown, hindwings chocolate brown, underside of the wings is chocolate brown.

The holotype of this species had been found central Madagascar at an altitude of 1200 m.
