= Caelicola =

Scientific classification
- Kingdom: Animalia
- Phylum: Arthropoda
- Class: Insecta
- Order: Lepidoptera
- Superfamily: Noctuoidea
- Family: Erebidae
- Tribe: Lymantriini
- Genus: Caelicola; Dognin, 1923
- Species: C. rostrata

Binomial name
- Caelicola rostrata Dognin, 1923

Genus of moths

Caelicola is a monotypic moth genus in the subfamily Lymantriinae. Its only species, Caelicola rostrata, is found in the Brazilian state of Amazonas. Both the genus and the species were first described by Paul Dognin in 1923.
