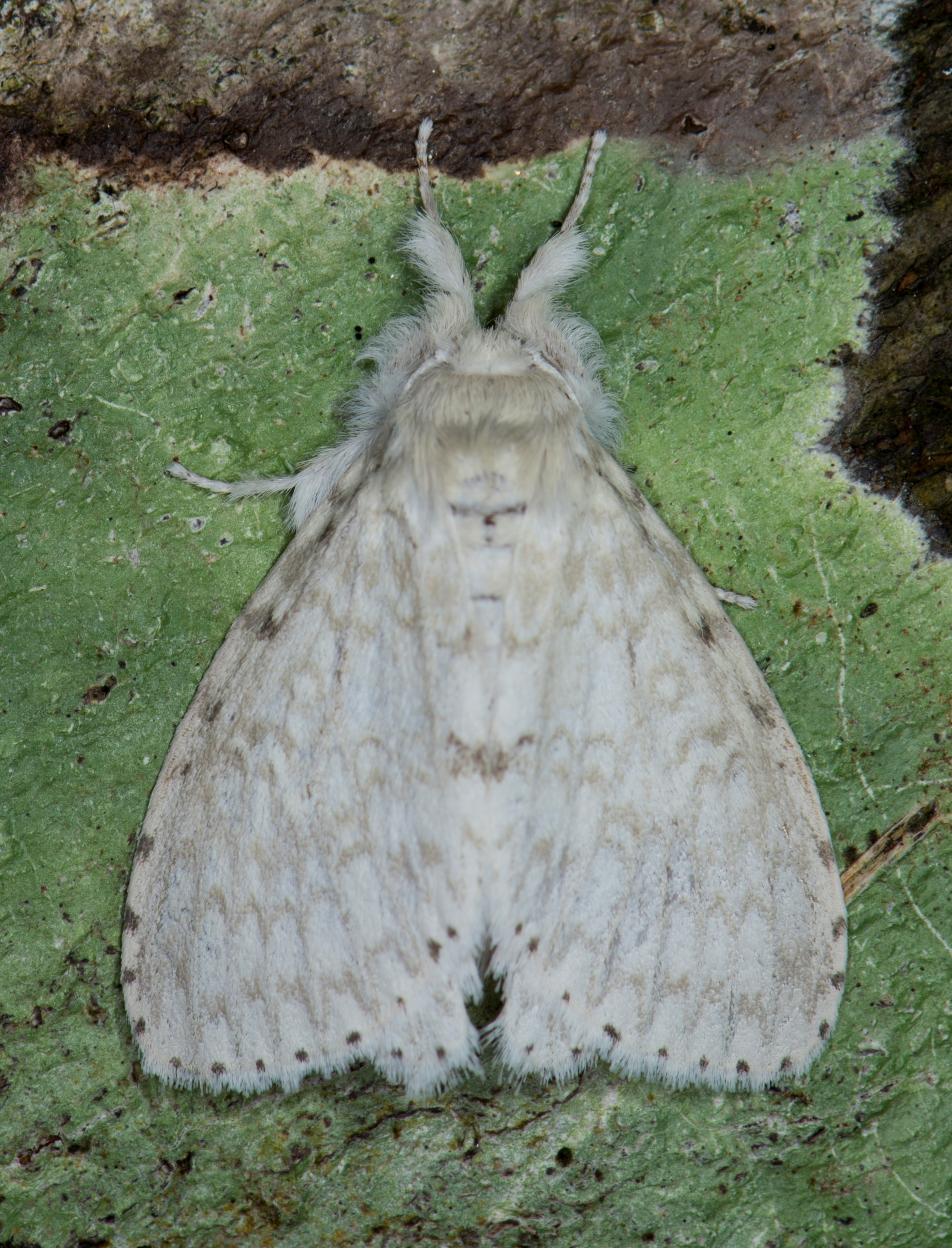
- Dura alba in Taiwan

Scientific classification
- Domain: Eukaryota
- Kingdom: Animalia
- Phylum: Arthropoda
- Class: Insecta
- Order: Lepidoptera
- Superfamily: Noctuoidea
- Family: Erebidae
- Tribe: Lymantriini
- Genus: Dura; Moore, 1879

= Dura (moth) =

Genus of moths

Dura is a genus of tussock moths in the family Erebidae. The genus was erected by Frederic Moore in 1879.

== Species ==
The genus includes the following species:

- Dura ageta Collenette 1955
- Dura alba Moore, 1879
- Dura albicans Walker 1856
- Dura amianta Collenette 1932
- Dura amplipennis Walker 1865
- Dura apalochroa Collenette 1930
- Dura basistriga Joicey & Talbot 1917
- Dura centema Collenette 1947
- Dura cinnamomina Rothschild 1915
- Dura dasychiroides Rothschild 1930
- Dura dubia Bethune-Baker 1904
- Dura eucraera Collenette 1949
- Dura helicta Collenette 1949
- Dura isabella Collenette 1947
- Dura leptodes Collenette 1947
- Dura marginepunctata Bethune-Baker 1904
- Dura nepha Joicey & Talbot 1917
- Dura niveus Bethune-Baker 1904
- Dura ochrias Turner 1906
- Dura passonyx Collenette 1947
- Dura plectrophora Collenette 1947
- Dura pratti Bethune-Baker 1904
- Dura prionodesma Turner 1920
- Dura pseudalba Holloway 1999
- Dura silca Swinhoe 1903
- Dura spodea Bethune-Baker 1904
- Dura sulphurea Bethune-Baker 1904
