= Stilpnaroma =

Scientific classification
- Domain: Eukaryota
- Kingdom: Animalia
- Phylum: Arthropoda
- Class: Insecta
- Order: Lepidoptera
- Superfamily: Noctuoidea
- Family: Erebidae
- Tribe: Lymantriini
- Genus: Stilpnaroma; E. M. Hering, 1926

Genus of moths

Stilpnaroma is a genus of moths in the subfamily Lymantriinae. The genus was erected by Erich Martin Hering in 1926.

== Species ==
- Stilpnaroma coenosa (Joannis, 1913) Eritrea
- Stilpnaroma nasisi Collenette, 1960 Kenya
- Stilpnaroma venosa Hering, 1926 Malawi
- Stilpnaroma vitrina (Mabille, 1878) Madagascar
