= Pyrrhopteryx =

Scientific classification
- Domain: Eukaryota
- Kingdom: Animalia
- Phylum: Arthropoda
- Class: Insecta
- Order: Lepidoptera
- Superfamily: Noctuoidea
- Family: Erebidae
- Tribe: Lymantriini
- Genus: Pyrrhopteryx; Hering, 1941

Genus of moths

Pyrrhopteryx is a genus of moths in the subfamily Lymantriinae. The genus was erected by Erich Martin Hering in 1941.

== Species ==
- Pyrrhopteryx amabilis Hering, 1941
- Pyrrhopteryx lowa Collenette, 1960
