= Pseudostracilla =

Scientific classification
- Domain: Eukaryota
- Kingdom: Animalia
- Phylum: Arthropoda
- Class: Insecta
- Order: Lepidoptera
- Superfamily: Noctuoidea
- Family: Erebidae
- Tribe: Lymantriini
- Genus: Pseudostracilla; E. M. Hering, 1926
- Species: P. infausta

Binomial name
- Pseudostracilla infausta Hering, 1926

Genus of moths

Pseudostracilla is a monotypic moth genus in the subfamily Lymantriinae. Its only species, Pseudostracilla infausta, is found in Sierra Leone. Both the genus and the species were first described by Erich Martin Hering in 1926.
