= Paraxena =

Scientific classification
- Domain: Eukaryota
- Kingdom: Animalia
- Phylum: Arthropoda
- Class: Insecta
- Order: Lepidoptera
- Superfamily: Noctuoidea
- Family: Erebidae
- Tribe: Lymantriini
- Genus: Paraxena; Bethune-Baker, 1911

Genus of moths

Paraxena is a genus of moths in the subfamily Lymantriinae. The genus was erected by George Thomas Bethune-Baker in 1911. Both species are found in Angola.

== Species ==
- Paraxena esquamata Bethune-Baker, 1911
- Paraxena angola Bethune-Baker, 1911
