= Parabatella =

Scientific classification
- Kingdom: Animalia
- Phylum: Arthropoda
- Class: Insecta
- Order: Lepidoptera
- Superfamily: Noctuoidea
- Family: Erebidae
- Tribe: Lymantriini
- Genus: Parabatella; Dall'Asta, 1981
- Species: P. polyploca

Binomial name
- Parabatella polyploca (Collenette, 1960)

Genus of moths

Parabatella is a monotypic moth genus in the subfamily Lymantriinae erected by Ugo Dall'Asta in 1981. Its only species, Parabatella polyploca, was first described by Cyril Leslie Collenette in 1960. It is found in the Democratic Republic of the Congo.

Lepidoptera and Some Other Life Forms gives this genus as a synonym of Dasychira Hübner, 1809 and the species as a synonym of Dasychira polyploca Collenette, 1961.
