= Pseudarctia =

Scientific classification
- Kingdom: Animalia
- Phylum: Arthropoda
- Clade: Pancrustacea
- Class: Insecta
- Order: Lepidoptera
- Superfamily: Noctuoidea
- Family: Erebidae
- Subfamily: Lymantriinae
- Tribe: Incertae sedis
- Genus: Pseudarctia; Bethune-Baker, 1911
- Species: P. nivea

Binomial name
- Pseudarctia nivea Bethune-Baker, 1911

Synonyms
- Acantharctia rubrifemora Bethune-Baker, 1913; Dasychira ugandensis Hering, 1926

Genus of moths

Pseudarctia nivea is a species of tussock moth in the family Erebidae. The genus Pseudarctia includes only this species, which was previously classified in the Arctiinae (subfamily of tiger and lichen moths) but later reclassified as a tussock moth (subfamily Lymantriinae). The species was described by Per Olof Christopher Aurivillius in 1899 and is found in Uganda.
