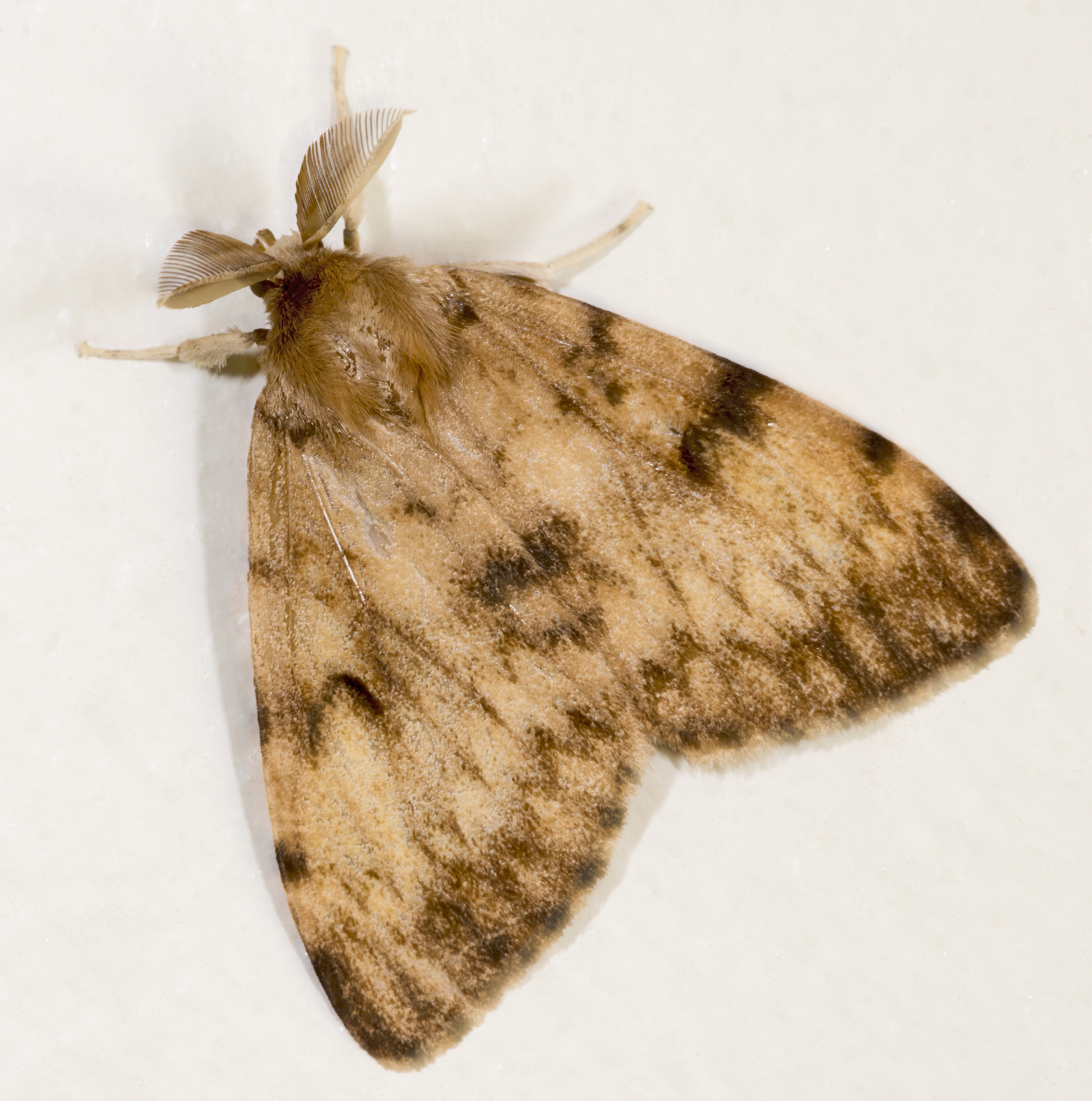
- Lymantria dispar

Scientific classification
- Domain: Eukaryota
- Kingdom: Animalia
- Phylum: Arthropoda
- Class: Insecta
- Order: Lepidoptera
- Superfamily: Noctuoidea
- Family: Erebidae
- Tribe: Lymantriini
- Genus: Lymantica; Collenette, 1936

= Lymantica =

Genus of moths

Lymantica is a genus of moths in the subfamily Lymantriinae. The genus was erected by Cyril Leslie Collenette in 1936.

== Taxonomy ==
The Global Lepidoptera Names Index and Lepidoptera and Some Other Life Forms give this name as a synonym of Lymantria Hübner, [1819]. Afromoths lists it as a full genus with the species below.

== Species listed by Afromoths ==
- Lymantica arrheta (Collenette, 1959)
- Lymantica canariensis (Kenrick, 1914)
- Lymantica castaneostriata (Kenrick, 1914)
- Lymantica cidariensis Kühne, 2010
- Lymantica hypobolimaea (Collenette, 1959)
- Lymantica leucophaes (Collenette, 1936)
- Lymantica malgassica (Kenrick, 1914)
- Lymantica phaeosericea (Mabille, 1884)
- Lymantica pruinosa (Butler, 1879)
- Lymantica radiata Griveaud, 1977
- Lymantica rufofusca (Mabille, 1900)
- Lymantica suarezia (Mabille, 1898)
- Lymantica velutina (Mabille, 1879)
- Lymantica xanthosoma (Saalmüller, 1884)
