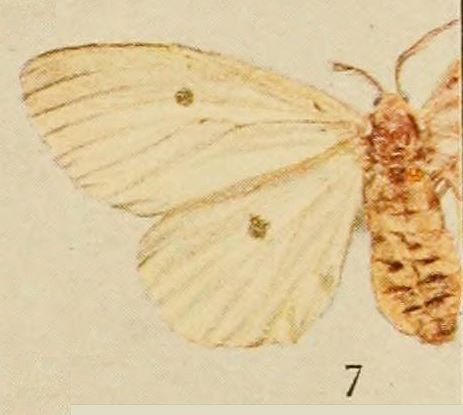

Scientific classification
- Domain: Eukaryota
- Kingdom: Animalia
- Phylum: Arthropoda
- Class: Insecta
- Order: Lepidoptera
- Superfamily: Noctuoidea
- Family: Erebidae
- Tribe: Lymantriini
- Genus: Sphragista; Collenette, 1934

= Sphragista =

Genus of moths

Sphragista is a genus of moths in the subfamily Lymantriinae. The genus was erected by Cyril Leslie Collenette in 1934.

== Species ==
- Sphragista collenettei Kiriakoff, 1963 Congo
- Sphragista kitchingi (Bethune-Baker, 1909) Uganda, north-western Congo
- Sphragista quadriguttata (Schultze, 1934) north-western Congo
