= Pendria =

Scientific classification
- Domain: Eukaryota
- Kingdom: Animalia
- Phylum: Arthropoda
- Class: Insecta
- Order: Lepidoptera
- Superfamily: Noctuoidea
- Family: Erebidae
- Tribe: Lymantriini
- Genus: Pendria; C. Swinhoe, 1906

Genus of moths

Pendria is a genus of moths in the subfamily Lymantriinae. The genus was erected by Charles Swinhoe in 1906.

== Species ==
- Pendria rinaria (Moore, [1860]) Java, Sumatra
- Pendria rotundata Swinhoe, 1906 Nias in Indonesia
- Pendria dica (Swinhoe, 1891) Khasi Hills of India
