= Soreutoneura =

Scientific classification
- Domain: Eukaryota
- Kingdom: Animalia
- Phylum: Arthropoda
- Class: Insecta
- Order: Lepidoptera
- Superfamily: Noctuoidea
- Family: Erebidae
- Tribe: Lymantriini
- Genus: Soreutoneura; Collenette, 1930
- Species: S. daedala

Binomial name
- Soreutoneura daedala Collenette, 1930

Genus of moths

Soreutoneura is a monotypic moth genus in the subfamily Lymantriinae. Its only species, Soreutoneura daedala, is found in New Guinea. Both the genus and the species were first described by Cyril Leslie Collenette in 1930.
