= Paraporthesia =

Scientific classification
- Domain: Eukaryota
- Kingdom: Animalia
- Phylum: Arthropoda
- Class: Insecta
- Order: Lepidoptera
- Superfamily: Noctuoidea
- Family: Erebidae
- Tribe: Lymantriini
- Genus: Paraporthesia; Gupta, Farooqi & Chaudhary, 1986
- Species: P. indica

Binomial name
- Paraporthesia indica Gupta, Farooqi & Chaudhary, 1986

Genus of moths

Paraporthesia is a monotypic moth genus in the subfamily Lymantriinae. Its only species, Paraporthesia indica, is found in India. Both the genus and the species were first described by S. L. Gupta, S. I. Farooqi and H. S. Chaudhary in 1986.
