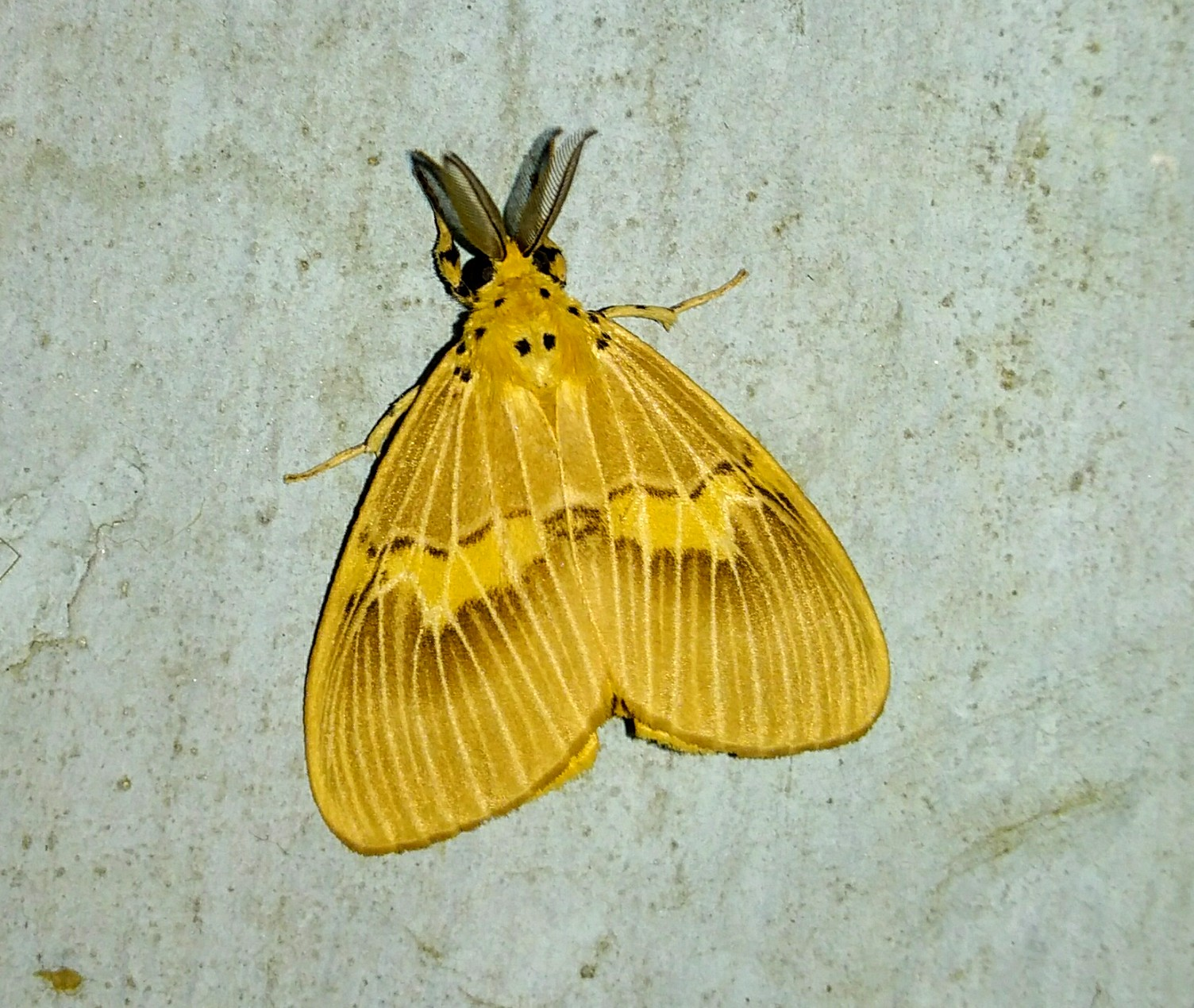

Scientific classification
- Kingdom: Animalia
- Phylum: Arthropoda
- Class: Insecta
- Order: Lepidoptera
- Superfamily: Noctuoidea
- Family: Erebidae
- Genus: Cispia
- Species: C. punctifascia

Binomial name
- Cispia punctifascia Walker, 1855

= Cispia punctifascia =

Species of moth

Cispia punctifascia is a moth of the family Erebidae first described by Francis Walker in 1855. It is found in India, Sri Lanka, Sumatra, Borneo and originated in Malaysia.

The moth is dull pale orange. The male sex has a strongly bipectinate (comb-like on both sides) antennae.
