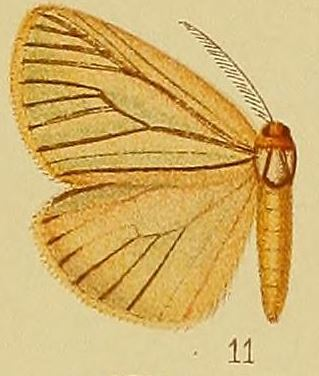
- Pseudobazisa phaeophlebia

Scientific classification
- Kingdom: Animalia
- Phylum: Arthropoda
- Class: Insecta
- Order: Lepidoptera
- Superfamily: Noctuoidea
- Family: Erebidae
- Tribe: Lymantriini
- Genus: Pseudobazisa; Bryk, 1934

= Pseudobazisa =

Genus of moths

Pseudobazisa is a genus of moths in the subfamily Lymantriinae. The genus was erected by Felix Bryk in 1934.

== Species ==
- Pseudobazisa desperata (Hering, 1929) Congo
- Pseudobazisa kapanga Collenette, 1939 Congo
- Pseudobazisa perculta (Distant, 1897) southern Africa
- Pseudobazisa thermochrous (Hering, 1929) Congo
