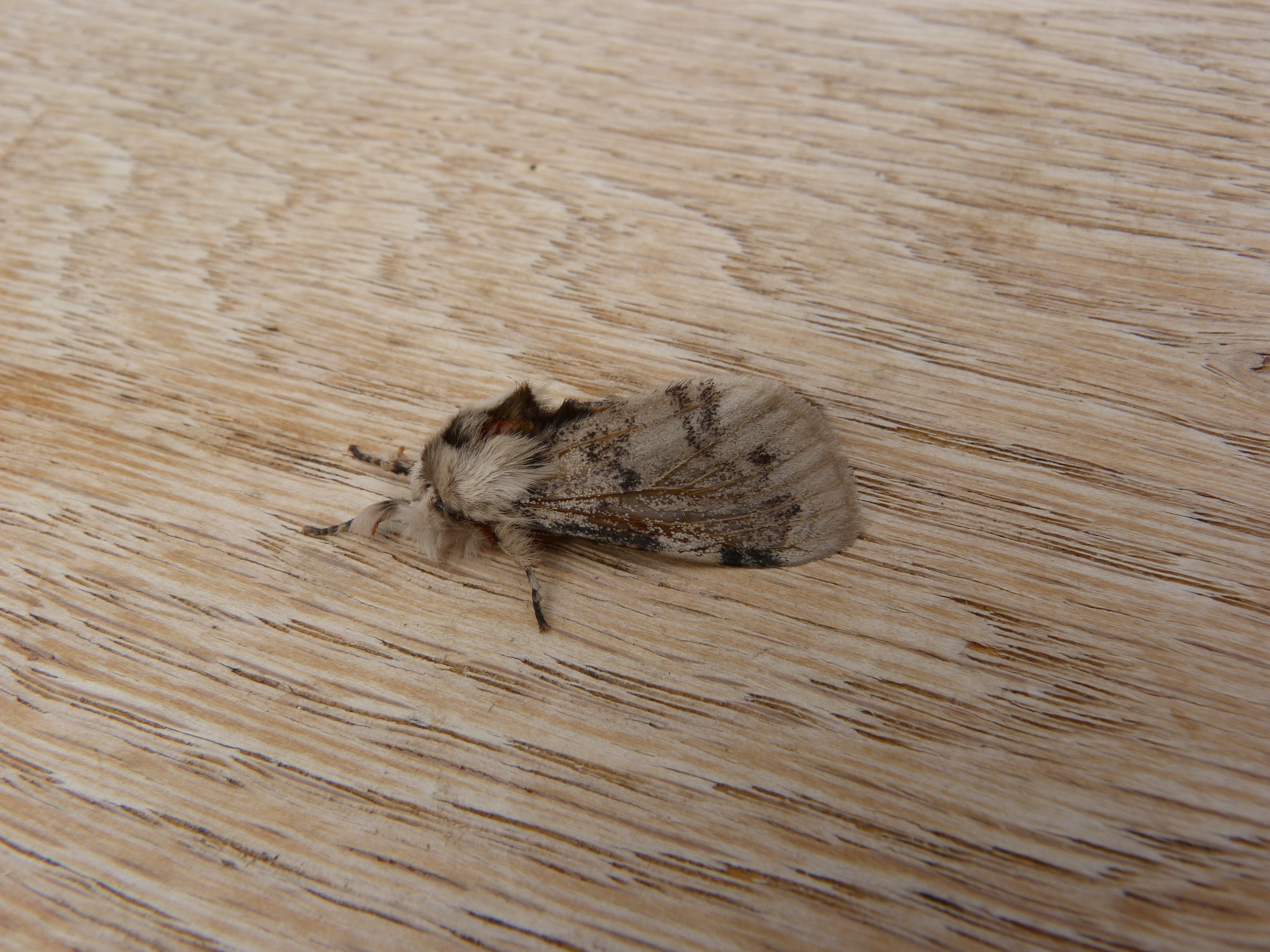

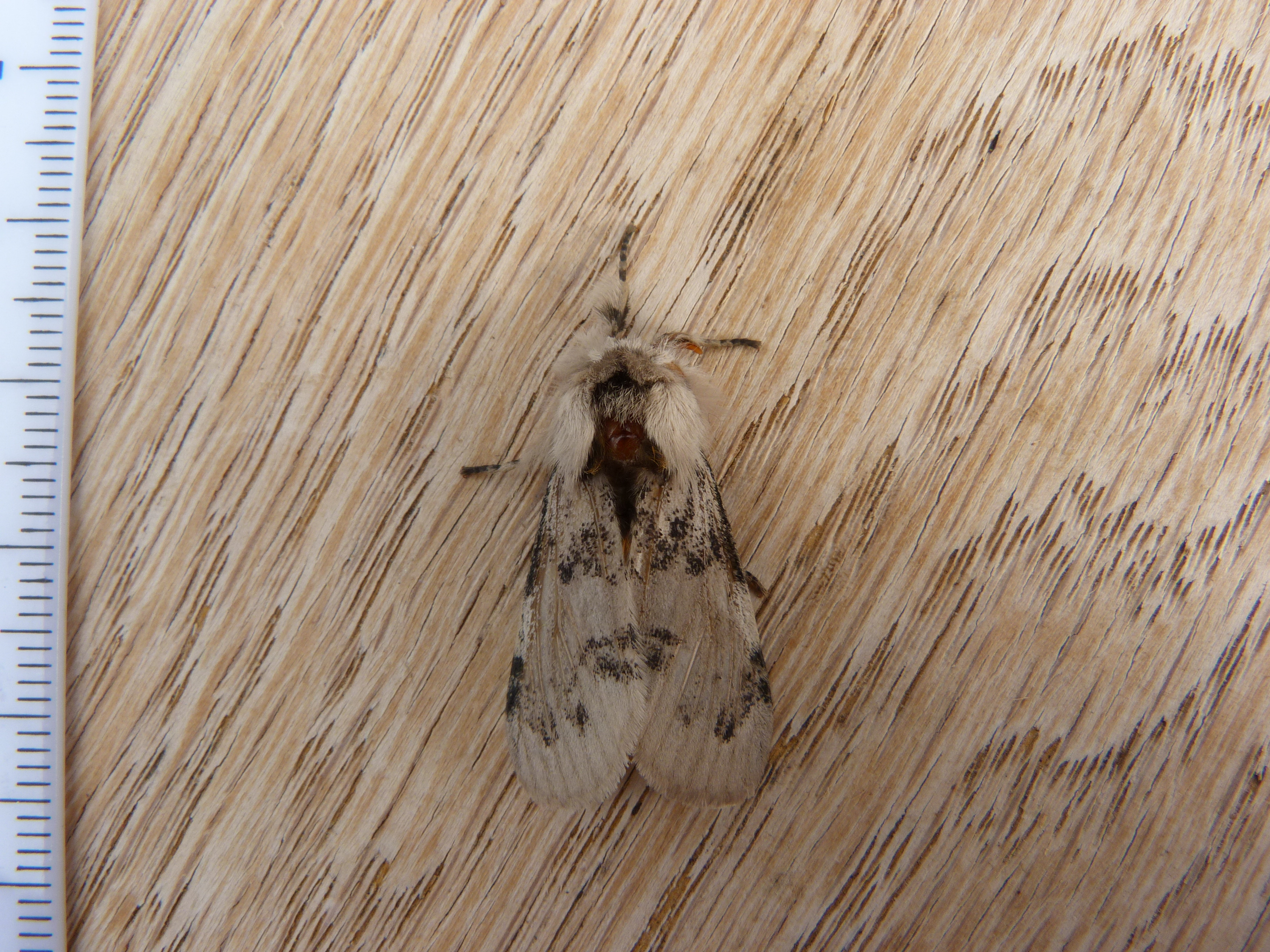

Scientific classification
- Domain: Eukaryota
- Kingdom: Animalia
- Phylum: Arthropoda
- Class: Insecta
- Order: Lepidoptera
- Superfamily: Noctuoidea
- Family: Erebidae
- Tribe: Lymantriini
- Genus: Iropoca; Turner, 1904
- Species: I. rotundata

Binomial name
- Iropoca rotundata (Walker, 1855)

Synonyms
- Teara rotundata Walker, 1855; Anthela sydneyensis Strand, 1929

= Iropoca =

Genus of moths

Iropoca is a monotypic moth genus in the subfamily Lymantriinae erected by Alfred Jefferis Turner in 1904. Its only species, Iropoca rotundata, the iropoca moth, was first described by Francis Walker in 1855. It is found in the Australian states of Victoria, New South Wales and Queensland.

The wingspan is about 30 mm for males while females are wingless.

The larvae feed on the foliage of various Eucalyptus species.
