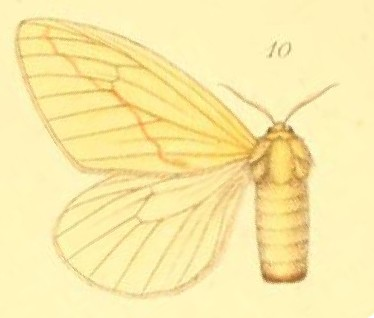
- Crorema adspersa

Scientific classification
- Kingdom: Animalia
- Phylum: Arthropoda
- Class: Insecta
- Order: Lepidoptera
- Superfamily: Noctuoidea
- Family: Erebidae
- Tribe: Lymantriini
- Genus: Crorema; Walker, 1855

= Crorema =

Genus of moths

Crorema is a genus of moths in the subfamily Lymantriinae. The genus was erected by Francis Walker in 1855.

== Species ==
Some species of this genus are:

- Crorema adspersa (Herrich-Schäffer, 1854)
- Crorema cartera Collenette, 1939
- Crorema collenettei Hering, 1932
- Crorema desperata Hering, 1929
- Crorema evanescens (Hampson, 1910)
- Crorema fulvinotata (Butler, 1893)
- Crorema fuscinotata (Hampson, 1910)
- Crorema jordani Collenette, 1936
- Crorema mentiens Walker, 1855
- Crorema moco (Collenette, 1936)
- Crorema nigropunctata Collenette, 1931
- Crorema ochracea (Snellen, 1872)
- Crorema quadristrigata Talbot, 1929
- Crorema sandoa Collenette, 1936
- Crorema setinoides (Holland, 1893)
- Crorema staphylinochrous Hering, 1926
- Crorema submaculata Collenette, 1931
- Crorema sudanica Strand, 1915
- Crorema viettei Collenette, 1960
