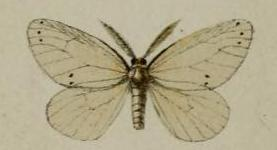

Scientific classification
- Kingdom: Animalia
- Phylum: Arthropoda
- Class: Insecta
- Order: Lepidoptera
- Superfamily: Noctuoidea
- Family: Erebidae
- Genus: Pirgula
- Species: P. atrinotata

Binomial name
- Pirgula atrinotata (Butler, 1897)

Synonyms
- Antiphella atrinotata Butler, 1897; Pirgula decempunctata Tessmann, 1921; Pirgula quinquepunctata (Wichgraf, 1921)

= Pirgula atrinotata =

Species of moth

Pirgula atrinotata is a moth in the subfamily Lymantriinae. It is found in Malawi, Mozambique, Zambia and Tanzania.
