= Cropera =

Scientific classification
- Kingdom: Animalia
- Phylum: Arthropoda
- Class: Insecta
- Order: Lepidoptera
- Superfamily: Noctuoidea
- Family: Erebidae
- Tribe: Lymantriini
- Genus: Cropera; Walker, 1855

Synonyms
- Laeliophila Hering, 1932

Genus of moths

Cropera is a genus of moths in the subfamily Lymantriinae. The genus was erected by Francis Walker in 1855.

== Species ==
- Cropera confalonierii Berio, 1937
- Cropera celaenogyia Collenette, 1936 Angola
- Cropera modesta (Schaus & Clements, 1893) Sierra Leone
- Cropera nigripes (Hampson, 1910) northern Nigeria
- Cropera phaeophlebia (Hampson, 1910) Congo
- Cropera phlebilis (Hampson, 1905) Zimbabwe
- Cropera sericea (Hampson, 1910) southern Africa
- Cropera sericoptera Collenette, 1932 Angola
- Cropera seydeli (Hering, 1932) Zaire, Angola
- Cropera stilpnaroma Hering, 1926
- Cropera sudanica (Strand, 1915) Sudan
- Cropera testacea Walker, 1855 southern and eastern Africa, Sudan
- Cropera unipunctata Wichgraf, 1921 Congo
- Cropera xanthophaes Collenette, 1960 Congo
