= Cispia alba =

Scientific classification
- Domain: Eukaryota
- Kingdom: Animalia
- Phylum: Arthropoda
- Class: Insecta
- Order: Lepidoptera
- Superfamily: Noctuoidea
- Family: Erebidae
- Genus: Cispia
- Species: C. alba

Binomial name
- Cispia alba (Moore, 1879)

Synonyms
- Caltura alba Moore, 1879; Caltura alba C. Swinhoe, 1922

Species of moth

Cispia alba is a moth of the family Erebidae first described by Frederic Moore in 1879. It is found in Sri Lanka.

The caterpillar is known to feed on Dysoxylum species.
