= Cimola =

Scientific classification
- Kingdom: Animalia
- Phylum: Arthropoda
- Class: Insecta
- Order: Lepidoptera
- Superfamily: Noctuoidea
- Family: Erebidae
- Tribe: Lymantriini
- Genus: Cimola; Walker, 1855
- Species: C. opalina

Binomial name
- Cimola opalina Walker, 1855

Synonyms
- Anomoetes thymiathis H. Druce

Genus of moths

Cimola is a monotypic moth genus in the subfamily Lymantriinae. Its only species, Cimola opalina, is found in South Africa. Both the genus and the species were first described by Francis Walker in 1855.
