= Barlowia =

Scientific classification
- Kingdom: Animalia
- Phylum: Arthropoda
- Clade: Pancrustacea
- Class: Insecta
- Order: Lepidoptera
- Superfamily: Noctuoidea
- Family: Erebidae
- Tribe: Lymantriini
- Genus: Barlowia; Talbot, 1929

Genus of moths

Barlowia is a genus of moths in the subfamily Lymantriinae. The genus was erected by George Talbot in 1929.

The genus was named after Harold Barlow, a colonial civil servant in Nyasaland (now Malawi), who was a keen amateur lepidopterist. Barlow discovered male and female specimens of the Barlowia zelotes species in 1925, near Zomba, Nyasaland. He sent them to the British Museum, where they were classified by Talbot. Those specimens are still held by the Natural History Museum in London: see the link below for a photograph of them taken in 2007 (©The Trustees of the Natural History Museum, London).

Male and female specimens of Barlowia zelotes, collected in Nyasaland in 1925.

== Species ==
- Barlowia zelotes Talbot, 1929 Malawi
- Barlowia pyrilampes Collenette, 1931 Zimbabwe
- Barlowia nephodes Collenette, 1932 Angola
