= Scleropactidae =

Scientific classification
- Kingdom: Animalia
- Phylum: Arthropoda
- Clade: Pancrustacea
- Class: Malacostraca
- Order: Isopoda
- Suborder: Oniscidea
- Family: Scleropactidae; Verhoeff, 1938

Family of woodlice

Scleropactidae is a family of woodlice, with a predominantly Gondwanan distribution. It contains the following genera:

- Adinda Budde-Lund, 1904 (18 species)
- Amazoniscus Lemos de Castro, 1967 (6 species)
- Aulaconiscus Taiti & Howarth, 1997 (monotypic)
- Caecopactes Schmidt, 2007 (monotypic)
- Circoniscus Pearse, 1917 (10 species)
- Colomboniscus Vandel, 1972 (3 species)
- Colomboscia Vandel, 1972 (5 species)
- Globarmadillo Richardson, 1910 (monotypic)
- Globopactes Schmidt, 2007 (6 species)
- Haplarmadillo Dollfuss, 1896 (monotypic)
- Heptapactes Schmidt, 2007 (monotypic)
- Kithironiscus Schmalfuss, 1995 (2 species)
- Matazonellus Juarrero de Varona & de Armas, 1996 (2 species)
- Microsphaeroniscus Lemos de Castro, 1985 (5 species)
- Neosanfilippia Brian, 1957 (2 species)
- †Palaeospherarmadillo Broly, 2018 (2 species)
- Paratoradjia Ferrara, Meli & Taiti, 1995 (4 species)
- Protoradjia Arcangeli, 1955 (5 species)
- †Protosphaeroniscus Schmalfuss, 1980 (monotypic)
- Richardsoniscus Vandel, 1963 (monotypic)
- Scleropactes Budde-Lund, 1885 (10 species)
- Scleropactoides Schmidt, 2007 (4 species)
- Sphaeroniscus Gerstaecker, 1854 (5 species)
- Spherarmadillo Richardson, 1907 (4 species)
- Suarezia Budde-Lund, 1904 (2 species)
- Toradjia Dollfus, 1907 (4 species)
- Troglopactes Schmidt, 2007 (monotypic)
- Xeroporcellio Strouhal, 1954 (monotypic)
