= Opoboa =

Scientific classification
- Domain: Eukaryota
- Kingdom: Animalia
- Phylum: Arthropoda
- Class: Insecta
- Order: Lepidoptera
- Superfamily: Noctuoidea
- Family: Erebidae
- Tribe: Lymantriini
- Genus: Opoboa; Tessmann, 1921

Genus of moths

Opoboa is a genus of moths in the subfamily Lymantriinae. The genus was erected by Tessmann in 1921.

== Species ==
- Opoboa bolivari (Kheil, 1909) Nigeria
- Opoboa chrysoparala Collenette, 1932 Gold Coast of Africa
- Opoboa vitrea (Aurivillius, 1910) Gabon
- Opoboa shultzei Tessmann, 1921 Nigeria
