= Orithrepta =

Scientific classification
- Domain: Eukaryota
- Kingdom: Animalia
- Phylum: Arthropoda
- Class: Insecta
- Order: Lepidoptera
- Superfamily: Noctuoidea
- Family: Erebidae
- Tribe: Lymantriini
- Genus: Orithrepta; Collenette, 1939
- Species: O. edwardsi

Binomial name
- Orithrepta edwardsi Collenette, 1939

Genus of moths

Orithrepta is a monotypic moth genus in the subfamily Lymantriinae. Its only species, Orithrepta edwardsi, is found in Uganda, where it was found on Mount Muhabura. Both the genus and the species were first described by Cyril Leslie Collenette in 1939.
