= Parapirga =

Scientific classification
- Domain: Eukaryota
- Kingdom: Animalia
- Phylum: Arthropoda
- Class: Insecta
- Order: Lepidoptera
- Superfamily: Noctuoidea
- Family: Erebidae
- Tribe: Lymantriini
- Genus: Parapirga; Bethune-Baker, 1911
- Species: P. neurabrunnea

Binomial name
- Parapirga neurabrunnea Bethune-Baker, 1911

Genus of moths

Parapirga is a monotypic moth genus in the subfamily Lymantriinae. Its only species, Parapirga neurabrunnea, is found in Angola. Both the genus and the species were first described by George Thomas Bethune-Baker in 1911.
