= Ogoa =

- Ogoa simplex

Scientific classification
- Kingdom: Animalia
- Phylum: Arthropoda
- Clade: Pancrustacea
- Class: Insecta
- Order: Lepidoptera
- Superfamily: Noctuoidea
- Family: Erebidae
- Tribe: Lymantriini
- Genus: Ogoa; Walker, 1856

Genus of moths

Ogoa is a genus of moths in the subfamily Lymantriinae erected by Francis Walker in 1856. The species are known from Africa.

- Ogoa fuscovenata Wichgraf, 1922 (Tanzania)
- Ogoa lutea (Grünberg, 1907) (eastern Africa)
- Ogoa luteola (Hering, 1926) (Congo)
- Ogoa melanocera (Mabille, 1879) (Madagascar)
- Ogoa neavei Rothschild, 1916 (Malawi)
- Ogoa oberthueri Rothschild, 1916 (Comoros, Madagascar)
- Ogoa simplex Walker, 1856 (Kenya, South Africa, Tanzania)
- Ogoa turbida (Hering, 1928) (Kenya)
- Ogoa vitrina (Mabille, 1879) (Madagascar)
