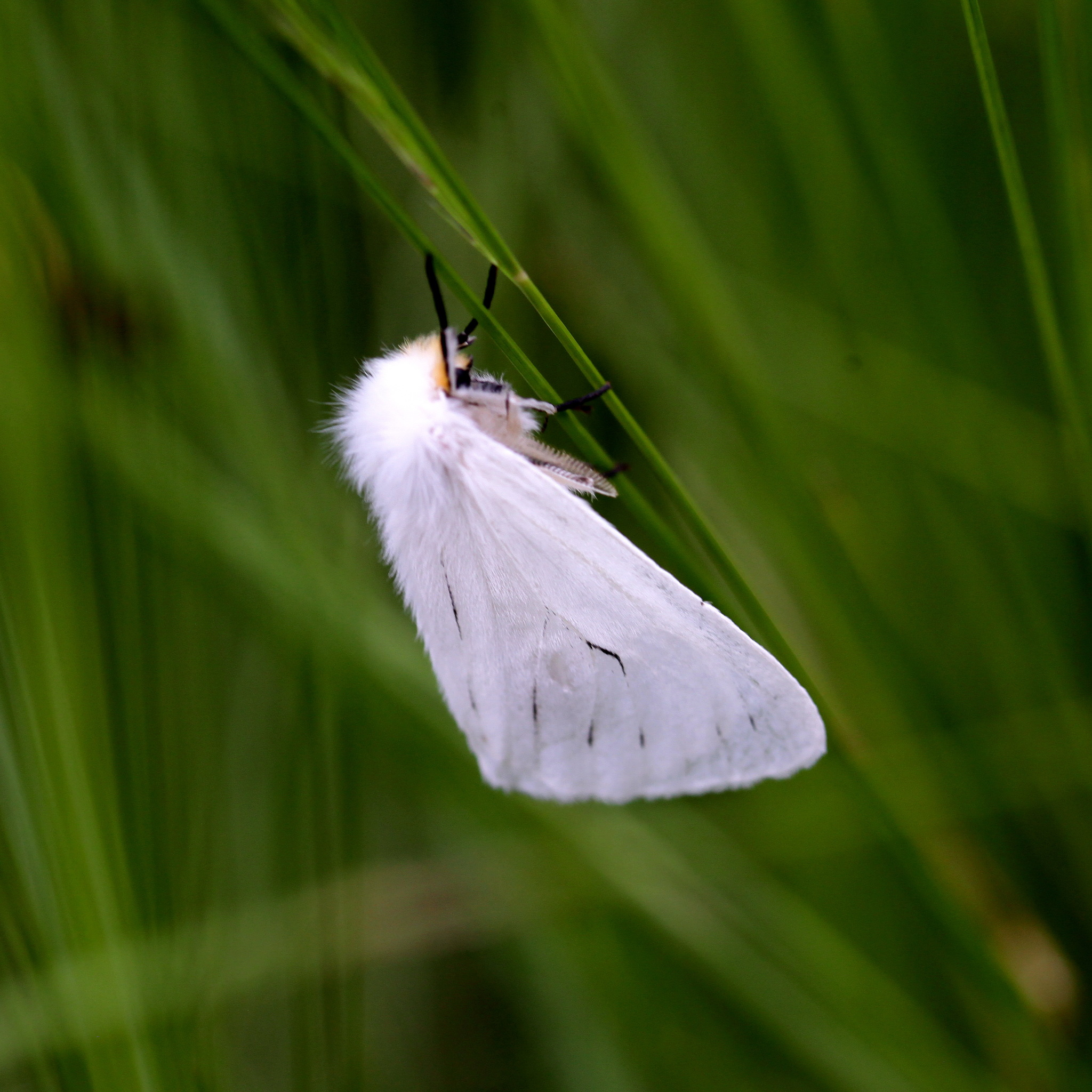
- Creagra liturata in South Africa

Scientific classification
- Kingdom: Animalia
- Phylum: Arthropoda
- Clade: Pancrustacea
- Class: Insecta
- Order: Lepidoptera
- Superfamily: Noctuoidea
- Family: Erebidae
- Tribe: Lymantriini
- Genus: Creagra; Wallengren, 1865

= Creagra =

Genus of moths

Creagra is a genus of moths in the subfamily Lymantriinae. The genus was described by Wallengren in 1865.

== Species ==
- Creagra comorensis Collenette, 1937 Grande Comoro
- Creagra liturata (Guérin-Méneville, [1844]) southern Africa
