= Pellucens =

Scientific classification
- Domain: Eukaryota
- Kingdom: Animalia
- Phylum: Arthropoda
- Class: Insecta
- Order: Lepidoptera
- Superfamily: Noctuoidea
- Family: Erebidae
- Tribe: Lymantriini
- Genus: Pellucens; Bethune-Baker, 1910

Genus of moths

Pellucens is a genus of moths in the subfamily Lymantriinae. The genus was erected by George Thomas Bethune-Baker in 1910.

== Species ==
- Pellucens borneensis (Strand, 1915)
- Pellucens kinabaluensis (Strand, 1915)
- Pellucens lactea Bethune-Baker, 1910 New Guinea
- Pellucens manifesta (Collenette, 1933) New Guinea
- Pellucens subdenudata (Rothschild, 1915) New Guinea
- Pellucens zeugosticta Collenette, 1938 Palawan, the Philippines
