= Paramarbla =

Scientific classification
- Domain: Eukaryota
- Kingdom: Animalia
- Phylum: Arthropoda
- Class: Insecta
- Order: Lepidoptera
- Superfamily: Noctuoidea
- Family: Erebidae
- Tribe: Lymantriini
- Genus: Paramarbla; Collenette, 1937

Genus of moths

Paramarbla is a genus of moths in the subfamily Lymantriinae. The genus was erected by Cyril Leslie Collenette in 1937.

== Species ==
- Paramarbla abyssinica Collenette, 1956 Ethiopia
- Paramarbla ansorgei Collenette, 1960 Congo
- Paramarbla azami (Kheil, 1909) Nigeria
- Paramarbla beni (Bethune-Baker, 1909) Congo, Nigeria
- Paramarbla catharia (Collenette, 1933) Uganda
- Paramarbla coelebs (Collenette, 1931)
- Paramarbla elegantula (Hering, 1926) Cameroon
- Paramarbla hemileuca (Rebel, 1914) north-eastern Congo
- Paramarbla indentata (Holland, 1893) western Africa
- Paramarbla lindblomi (Aurivillius, 1922) eastern Africa
- Paramarbla lutulenta (Collenette, 1931) western Africa
- Paramarbla nyctemerina (Rebel, 1914) north-eastern Congo
- Paramarbla tenera (Holland, 1893) western Africa
- Paramarbla teroensis Collenette, 1937 Uganda
