= Chrysocyma =

Scientific classification
- Kingdom: Animalia
- Phylum: Arthropoda
- Class: Insecta
- Order: Lepidoptera
- Superfamily: Noctuoidea
- Family: Erebidae
- Tribe: Lymantriini
- Genus: Chrysocyma; Hampson, 1905

Synonyms
- Leptaroa Hampson, 1910

Genus of moths

Chrysocyma is a genus of moths in the subfamily Lymantriinae. The genus was erected by George Hampson in 1905.

== Species ==
- Chrysocyma deleta (Hering, 1926) Tanzania
- Chrysocyma fulvicolora (Hampson, 1910) Congo, Zimbabwe
- Chrysocyma jordani (Hering, 1926) Angola
- Chrysocyma mesopotamia Hampson, 1905 Tanzania, Zimbabwe
- Chrysocyma ochricoloria (Strand, 1911) Tanzania
