= Scaphocera =

Scientific classification
- Domain: Eukaryota
- Kingdom: Animalia
- Phylum: Arthropoda
- Class: Insecta
- Order: Lepidoptera
- Superfamily: Noctuoidea
- Family: Erebidae
- Tribe: Lymantriini
- Genus: Scaphocera; Saalmüller, 1884

Genus of moths

Scaphocera is a genus of moths in the subfamily Lymantriinae from Madagascar. The genus was erected by Max Saalmüller in 1884.

== Species ==
Species of this genus are:

- Scaphocera marginepunctata (Saalmüller, 1878)
- Scaphocera turlini Griveaud, 1973
