= Croremopsis =

Scientific classification
- Domain: Eukaryota
- Kingdom: Animalia
- Phylum: Arthropoda
- Class: Insecta
- Order: Lepidoptera
- Superfamily: Noctuoidea
- Family: Erebidae
- Tribe: Lymantriini
- Genus: Croremopsis; Hering, 1926
- Species: C. argenna

Binomial name
- Croremopsis argenna (Mabille, [1900])

Synonyms
- Cypra argenna Mabille, [1900]; Redoa sericea Kenrick, 1914; Croremopsis innocens Hering, 1926

Genus of moths

Croremopsis is a monotypic moth genus in the subfamily Lymantriinae described by Hering in 1926. Its only species, Croremopsis argenna, was first described by Paul Mabille in 1900. It is found on Madagascar.
