= Conigephyra =

Scientific classification
- Domain: Eukaryota
- Kingdom: Animalia
- Phylum: Arthropoda
- Class: Insecta
- Order: Lepidoptera
- Superfamily: Noctuoidea
- Family: Erebidae
- Tribe: Lymantriini
- Genus: Conigephyra; Collenette, 1934

Genus of moths

Conigephyra is a genus of moths in the subfamily Lymantriinae. The genus was erected by Cyril Leslie Collenette in 1934.

== Species ==
- Conigephyra atrisquamata (Hampson, 1910) Gold Coast of western Africa
- Conigephyra citrona (Hering, 1926) Cameroon
- Conigephyra discolepia (Hampson, 1910) Sierra Leone
- Conigephyra flava (Bethune-Baker, 1911) western Africa
- Conigephyra leucoptera (Hering, 1926) Tanzania
- Conigephyra melanchila Collenette, 1960 Congo
- Conigephyra pallidula (Hering, 1926) Tanzania
- Conigephyra rikatia Collenette, 1956 Mozambique
- Conigephyra sericaria (Hering, 1926) Uganda
- Conigephyra splendida (Hering, 1926) Tanzania
- Conigephyra unipunctata (Möschler, 1887) western Africa
