= Stenaroa rubriflava =

Scientific classification
- Domain: Eukaryota
- Kingdom: Animalia
- Phylum: Arthropoda
- Class: Insecta
- Order: Lepidoptera
- Superfamily: Noctuoidea
- Family: Erebidae
- Genus: Stenaroa
- Species: S. rubriflava

Binomial name
- Stenaroa rubriflava Griveaud, 1973

Species of moth

Stenaroa rubriflava is a moth of the subfamily Lymantriinae first described by Paul Griveaud in 1973. It is found in eastern Madagascar.

The male of this species has a wingspan of 18–24 mm.

The holotype of this species had been found north-eastern Madagascar 50 km west of Andapa at elevation of 1600 m.
