= Takashachia =

Scientific classification
- Kingdom: Animalia
- Phylum: Arthropoda
- Clade: Pancrustacea
- Class: Insecta
- Order: Lepidoptera
- Superfamily: Noctuoidea
- Family: Erebidae
- Tribe: Lymantriini
- Genus: Takashachia; Matsumura, 1929
- Species: T. maculosa

Binomial name
- Takashachia maculosa Matsumura, 1929

Genus of moths

Takashachia is a monotypic moth genus in the subfamily Lymantriinae. Its only species, Takashachia maculosa, is found in Taiwan. Both the genus and the species were first described by Shōnen Matsumura in 1929.
