= Suarezina =

Suarezina albicollis

Scientific classification
- Kingdom: Animalia
- Phylum: Arthropoda
- Class: Insecta
- Order: Coleoptera
- Suborder: Polyphaga
- Infraorder: Elateriformia
- Family: Buprestidae
- Genus: Suarezina; Théry, 1912
- Species: S. albicollis

Binomial name
- Suarezina albicollis (Théry, 1912)

Synonyms
- Suarezia Théry, 1912 (nom. inval., later homonym of Suarezia Budde-Lund, 1904; Suarezia albicollis Théry, 1912

Genus of beetles

Suarezina albicollis is a species of beetles in the family Buprestidae, the only species in the genus Suarezina.
