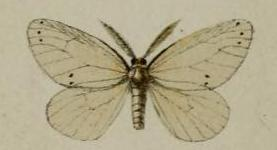
- Pirgula atrinotata

Scientific classification
- Kingdom: Animalia
- Phylum: Arthropoda
- Clade: Pancrustacea
- Class: Insecta
- Order: Lepidoptera
- Superfamily: Noctuoidea
- Family: Erebidae
- Tribe: Lymantriini
- Genus: Pirgula; Tessmann, 1921

Synonyms
- Pirgulina Hering, 1926

= Pirgula =

Genus of moths

Pirgula is a genus of moths in the subfamily Lymantriinae. The genus was erected by Tessmann in 1921.

== Species ==
Some species are:

- Pirgula atrinotata (Butler, 1897) Tanzania
- Pirgula delicata Griveaud, 1973 Madagascar
- Pirgula delosema Collenette, 1953 Rhodesia
- Pirgula gracillima (Holland, 1893)
- Pirgula jordani (Hering, 1926) Madagascar
- Pirgula melanoma Collenette, 1936 Madagascar
- Pirgula monopunctata Griveaud, 1973 Madagascar
- Pirgula octoguttata (Tessmann, 1921) Cameroons
- Pirgula polylopha Collenette, 1959 Madagascar
- Pirgula polyopha Collenette, 1959
- Pirgula quinquepunctata (Wichgraf, 1921) Tanzania
- Pirgula sexpunctata Griveaud, 1973 Madagascar
- Pirgula stictogonia Collenette, 1936 Angola
