= Paraproctis =

Scientific classification
- Domain: Eukaryota
- Kingdom: Animalia
- Phylum: Arthropoda
- Class: Insecta
- Order: Lepidoptera
- Superfamily: Noctuoidea
- Family: Erebidae
- Tribe: Lymantriini
- Genus: Paraproctis; Bethune-Baker, 1911

Genus of moths

Paraproctis is a genus of moths in the subfamily Lymantriinae. The genus was erected by George Thomas Bethune-Baker in 1911.

== Species ==
- Paraproctis osiris Bethune-Baker, 1911 western Africa
- Paraproctis calamolopha Collenette, 1936 Uganda
- Paraproctis chionopeza Collenette, 1954 Zimbabwe
- Paraproctis coulsoni Collenette, 1954 Kenya
