= Oranda (disambiguation) =

An oranda is a breed of goldfish. Oranda may also refer to:

- Oranda, Odisha, India
- Oranda, Virginia, United States
- Oranda Formation, a geologic formation in Virginia

== See also ==
- Orlanda (disambiguation)
