= Papuaroa =

Scientific classification
- Kingdom: Animalia
- Phylum: Arthropoda
- Class: Insecta
- Order: Lepidoptera
- Superfamily: Noctuoidea
- Family: Erebidae
- Tribe: Lymantriini
- Genus: Papuaroa; Collenette, 1955
- Species: P. miccyla

Binomial name
- Papuaroa miccyla Collenette, 1955

Genus of moths

Papuaroa is a monotypic moth genus in the subfamily Lymantriinae. Its only species, Papuaroa miccyla, is found in New Guinea where it was found in the Sudirman Range. Both the genus and the species were first described by Cyril Leslie Collenette in 1955.
