= Parakanchia =

Scientific classification
- Kingdom: Animalia
- Phylum: Arthropoda
- Class: Insecta
- Order: Lepidoptera
- Superfamily: Noctuoidea
- Family: Erebidae
- Tribe: Lymantriini
- Genus: Parakanchia; Bethune-Baker, 1908

Genus of moths

Parakanchia is a genus of moths in the subfamily Lymantriinae. The genus was erected by George Thomas Bethune-Baker in 1908. The species are found in New Guinea., in the southwestern Pacific Ocean.

== Species ==
- Parakanchia irregularis (Bethune-Baker, 1904)
- Parakanchia cyclops Collenette, 1951
- Parakanchia opaca Collenette, 1955
