= Sirana (moth) =

Scientific classification
- Domain: Eukaryota
- Kingdom: Animalia
- Phylum: Arthropoda
- Class: Insecta
- Order: Lepidoptera
- Superfamily: Noctuoidea
- Family: Erebidae
- Tribe: Lymantriini
- Genus: Sirana; Griveaud, 1976

Genus of moths

Sirana is a genus of moths in the subfamily Lymantriinae. The genus was erected by Paul Griveaud in 1976.

== Species ==
- Sirana ankalirano Griveaud, 1977
- Sirana beloha Griveaud, 1977
- Sirana lygropis (Collenette, 1954)
