= Porthesaroa =

Scientific classification
- Domain: Eukaryota
- Kingdom: Animalia
- Phylum: Arthropoda
- Class: Insecta
- Order: Lepidoptera
- Superfamily: Noctuoidea
- Family: Erebidae
- Tribe: Lymantriini
- Genus: Porthesaroa; Hering, 1926

Genus of moths

Porthesaroa is a genus of moths in the subfamily Lymantriinae. The genus was erected by Erich Martin Hering in 1926.

== Species ==
- Porthesaroa aclyta Collenette, 1953 Madagascar
- Porthesaroa aureopsis Hering, 1926 Madagascar
- Porthesaroa brunea Griveaud, 1973 Madagascar
- Porthesaroa lacipa Hering, 1926 Cameroon
- Porthesaroa lithoides (Collenette, 1936) Madagascar
- Porthesaroa maculata Collenette, 1938 Congo
- Porthesaroa nicotrai Hartig, 1940 Somalia
- Porthesaroa noctua Hering, 1926 western Africa
- Porthesaroa parvula (Kenrick, 1914) Madagascar
- Porthesaroa procincta Saalmüller, 1880
- Porthesaroa sogai Griveaud, 1973 Madagascar
- Porthesaroa xanthoselas Collenette, 1959
