= Sevastopuloa =

Scientific classification
- Domain: Eukaryota
- Kingdom: Animalia
- Phylum: Arthropoda
- Class: Insecta
- Order: Lepidoptera
- Superfamily: Noctuoidea
- Family: Erebidae
- Tribe: Lymantriini
- Genus: Sevastopuloa; Collenette, 1960
- Species: S. celaenocera

Binomial name
- Sevastopuloa celaenocera Collenette, 1960

Genus of moths

Sevastopuloa is a monotypic moth genus in the subfamily Lymantriinae. Its only species, Sevastopuloa celaenocera, is found in Kenya. Both the genus and the species were first described by Cyril Leslie Collenette in 1960.
