= Staetherinia =

Scientific classification
- Domain: Eukaryota
- Kingdom: Animalia
- Phylum: Arthropoda
- Class: Insecta
- Order: Lepidoptera
- Superfamily: Noctuoidea
- Family: Erebidae
- Tribe: Lymantriini
- Genus: Staetherinia; Butler, 1878

Genus of moths

Staetherinia is a genus of moths in the subfamily Lymantriinae. The genus was erected by Arthur Gardiner Butler in 1878.

== Species ==
- Staetherinia alyzia Dognin, 1920 French Guiana
- Staetherinia cayugana Schaus, 1920 Guatemala
- Staetherinia corydona (Druce, 1898) Panama
- Staetherinia dodona (Druce, 1898) Panama
- Staetherinia semilutea (Walker, 1866) Pará in Brazil
- Staetherinia valstana Schaus, 1927 Panama
