= Ocnerogyia =

Scientific classification
- Domain: Eukaryota
- Kingdom: Animalia
- Phylum: Arthropoda
- Class: Insecta
- Order: Lepidoptera
- Superfamily: Noctuoidea
- Family: Erebidae
- Tribe: Lymantriini
- Genus: Ocnerogyia; Staudinger, [1892]
- Species: O. amanda

Binomial name
- Ocnerogyia amanda Staudinger, [1892]

Genus of moths

Ocnerogyia is a monotypic moth genus in the subfamily Lymantriinae. Its only species, Ocnerogyia amanda, is found in Iran. Both the genus and the species were first described by Staudinger in 1892.
