= Terphothrix =

Scientific classification
- Domain: Eukaryota
- Kingdom: Animalia
- Phylum: Arthropoda
- Class: Insecta
- Order: Lepidoptera
- Superfamily: Noctuoidea
- Family: Erebidae
- Tribe: Lymantriini
- Genus: Terphothrix; Holland, 1893

Genus of moths

Terphothrix is a genus of moths in the subfamily Lymantriinae. The genus was erected by William Jacob Holland in 1893.

== Species ==
- Terphothrix callima (Bethune-Baker, 1911) western Africa
- Terphothrix lanaria Holland, 1893 Gabon
- Terphothrix seydeli Collenette, 1954 Congo
- Terphothrix tenuis (Holland, 1893) western Africa
