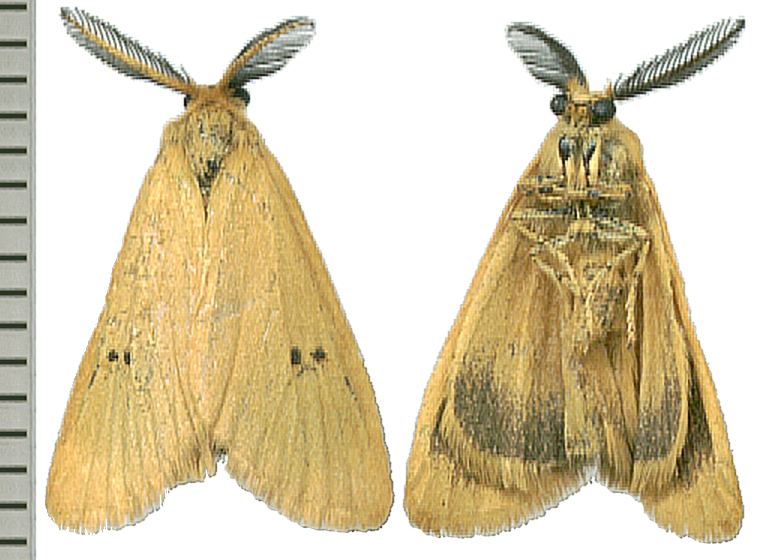
- B. quadripunctata from South Africa

Scientific classification
- Kingdom: Animalia
- Phylum: Arthropoda
- Class: Insecta
- Order: Lepidoptera
- Superfamily: Noctuoidea
- Family: Erebidae
- Tribe: Lymantriini
- Genus: Bracharoa; Hampson, 1905

= Bracharoa =

Genus of moths

Bracharoa is a genus of moths in the subfamily Lymantriinae. The genus was erected by George Hampson in 1905.

Species include:

- Bracharoa bistigmigera
- Bracharoa charax
- Bracharoa dregei
- Bracharoa impunctata
- Bracharoa paupera
- Bracharoa quadripunctata
- Bracharoa ragazzii
- Bracharoa reducta
