= Pirgula delicata =

Scientific classification
- Domain: Eukaryota
- Kingdom: Animalia
- Phylum: Arthropoda
- Class: Insecta
- Order: Lepidoptera
- Superfamily: Noctuoidea
- Family: Erebidae
- Genus: Pirgula
- Species: P. delicata

Binomial name
- Pirgula delicata Griveaud, 1973

Species of moth

Pirgula delicata is a moth of the subfamily Lymantriinae. It is found in eastern Madagascar.

The holotype was found near Moramanga.
