= Stracilla =

Scientific classification
- Domain: Eukaryota
- Kingdom: Animalia
- Phylum: Arthropoda
- Class: Insecta
- Order: Lepidoptera
- Superfamily: Noctuoidea
- Family: Erebidae
- Tribe: Lymantriini
- Genus: Stracilla; Aurivillius, 1910

Genus of moths

Stracilla is a genus of moths in the subfamily Lymantriinae. The genus was erected by Per Olof Christopher Aurivillius in 1910.

== Species ==
- Stracilla fowleri Collenette 1956
- Stracilla ghesquierei Collenette 1937
- Stracilla translucida Oberthür 1880
