= Parvaroa =

Scientific classification
- Kingdom: Animalia
- Phylum: Arthropoda
- Clade: Pancrustacea
- Class: Insecta
- Order: Lepidoptera
- Superfamily: Noctuoidea
- Family: Erebidae
- Tribe: Incertae sedis
- Genus: Parvaroa; Holloway, 1999

Genus of moths

Parvaroa is a genus of tussock moths in the family Erebidae.

== Species ==
The following species are included in the genus.

- Parvaroa cinerea Holloway, 1976
- Parvaroa obscura Holloway, 1999
- Parvaroa shelfordi Collenette, 1932
- Parvaroa tisdala Swinhoe, 1903
