= Kintana =

Scientific classification
- Domain: Eukaryota
- Kingdom: Animalia
- Phylum: Arthropoda
- Class: Insecta
- Order: Lepidoptera
- Superfamily: Noctuoidea
- Family: Erebidae
- Subfamily: Lymantriinae
- Genus: Kintana; Griveaud, 1976
- Species: K. ocellatula

Binomial name
- Kintana ocellatula (Hering, 1926)

Synonyms
- Dasychira ocellatula Hering, 1926; Dasychira ocellata Kenrick, 1914

Genus of moths

Kintana is a monotypic moth genus in the subfamily Lymantriinae erected by Paul Griveaud in 1976. Its only species, Kintana ocellatula, was first described by Hering in 1926. It is found on Madagascar.
