= Synogdoa =

Scientific classification
- Domain: Eukaryota
- Kingdom: Animalia
- Phylum: Arthropoda
- Class: Insecta
- Order: Lepidoptera
- Superfamily: Noctuoidea
- Family: Erebidae
- Tribe: Lymantriini
- Genus: Synogdoa; Aurivillius, 1904

Synonyms
- Carpenterella Collenette, 1933

Genus of moths

Synogdoa is a genus of moths in the subfamily Lymantriinae. The genus was erected by Per Olof Christopher Aurivillius in 1904.

== Species ==
- Synogdoa burgessi Collenette, 1957 Uganda
- Synogdoa chionobosca (Collenette, 1960) Uganda
- Synogdoa miltophleba (Collenette, 1960) Congo
- Synogdoa nesiotica (Collenette, 1933) Uganda
- Synogdoa simplex Aurivillius, 1904 western Africa
