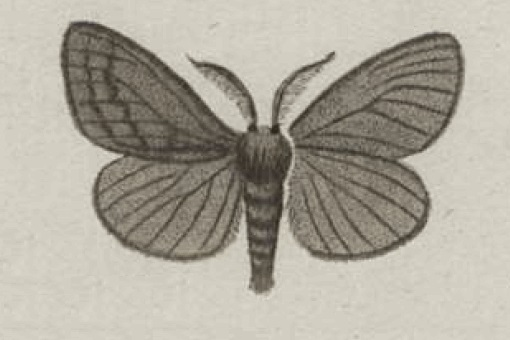

Scientific classification
- Domain: Eukaryota
- Kingdom: Animalia
- Phylum: Arthropoda
- Class: Insecta
- Order: Lepidoptera
- Superfamily: Noctuoidea
- Family: Erebidae
- Genus: Ocneria
- Species: O. detrita

Binomial name
- Ocneria detrita (Esper, 1785)

Synonyms
- Bombyx detrita Esper, 1785; Parocneria detrita (Esper, 1785)

= Ocneria detrita =

Species of moth

Ocneria detrita is a moth of the subfamily Lymantriinae. The species was first described by Eugenius Johann Christoph Esper in 1785. It is found in France, Italy and parts of central, south-east and eastern Europe.

The wingspan is 30–34 mm.
