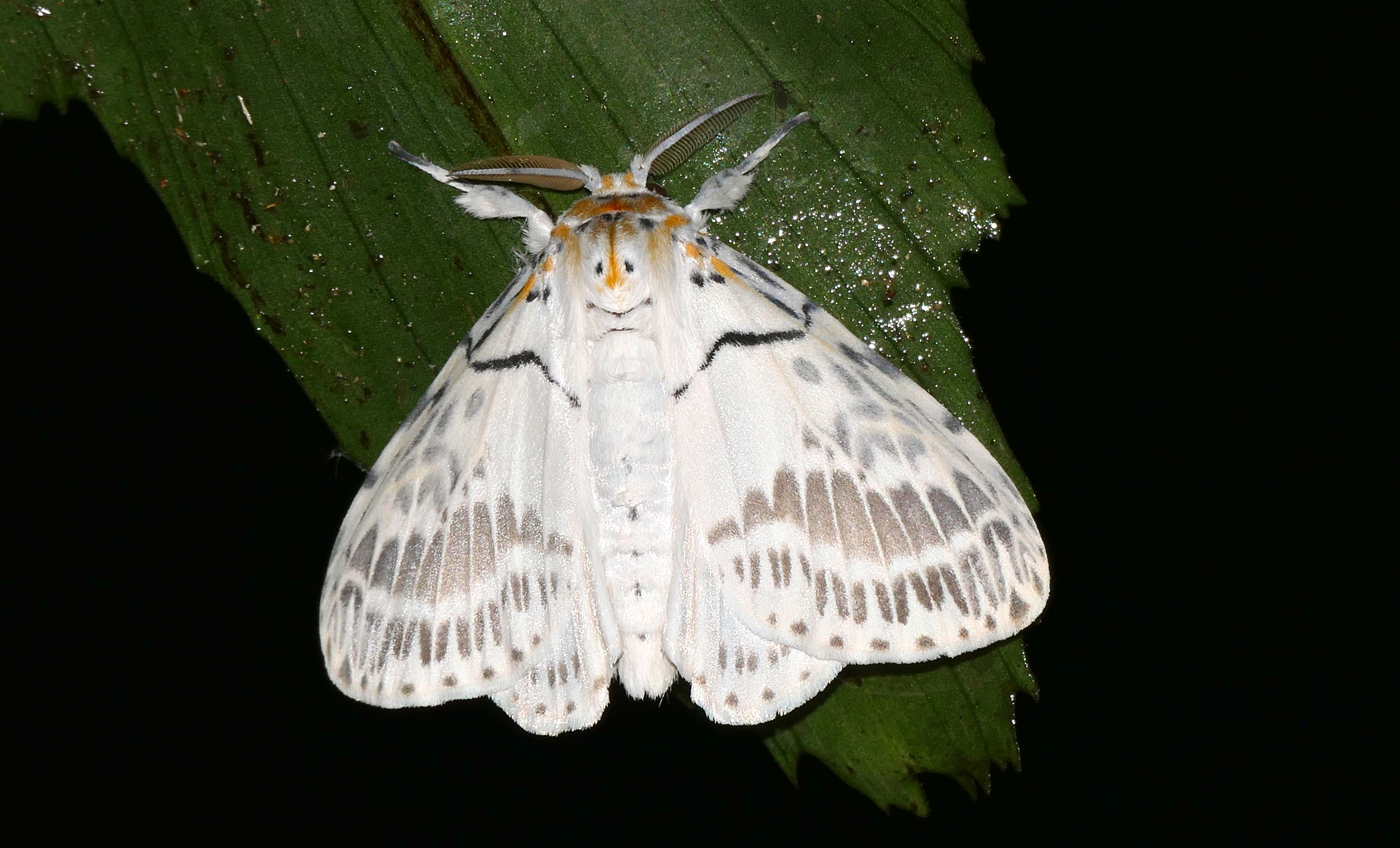
- Psilochira amydra in Gunung Mulu National Park, Malaysia

Scientific classification
- Kingdom: Animalia
- Phylum: Arthropoda
- Class: Insecta
- Order: Lepidoptera
- Superfamily: Noctuoidea
- Family: Erebidae
- Tribe: Lymantriini
- Genus: Psilochira; Toxopeus, 1948

Type species
- Lymantria lineata Walker, 1855

Synonyms
- Imaida Toxopeus, 1948

= Psilochira =

Genus of moths

Psilochira is a genus of tussock moths in the family Erebidae. The genus was erected by Lambertus Johannes Toxopeus in 1948.

== Species ==
The following species are included in the genus:

- Psilochira amydra (Collenette 1932)
- Psilochira durioides (Strand 1915)
- Psilochira lineata (Walker 1855)
  - Psilochira lineata nycthemera Toxopeus 1948
  - Psilochira lineata sinuata Toxopeus 1948
- Psilochira venusta (Collenette 1933)
