= Oranda, Odisha =

Village in Odisha, India

Coordinates: 20.545°N 85.798°E

Oranda is a village located in the Gurudijhatia Block of the Athagad Tehsil of the Cuttack District of the Indian state of Odisha.

== Location ==
Oranda is located 16 kilometres (9.9 mi) north of the Cuttack district headquarters, 20 kilometres (12 mi) from Athagad, and 38 kilometres (24 mi) from the Bhubaneswar state capital.

Athagad Tehsil lies to Oranda's west, Baranga Tehsil to its south, Tangi Choudwar Tehsil to its east and Gondia Tehsil to its north. Oranda is on the border of the Cuttack District and Dhenkanal District. Dhenkanal is to the west of Oranda.

Gurudijhatia is the nearest town. Cuttack and Dhenkanal are near Oranda.

== Government ==
As per the constitution of India and Panchyati Raaj Act, Oranda village is administered by a "Sarpanch" (Head of Village), its elected representative.

== People, Culture, and Demographics ==
As of 2011 Census, Oranda has a population of 1226, of which 621 are males and 605 are females. The population of children ages 0–6 is 109, 8.89% of the total. The sex ratio is 974, lower than the state average of 979. The child sex ratio is 982, higher than the Orissa average of 941.

Oranda has a higher literacy rate than Orissa. In 2011, its literacy rate was 84.42% compared to 72.87%. In Oranda, male literacy stands at 90.11% while female literacy is 78.58%.

The village of Oranda is administrated by an elected Sarpanch, who serves as head and representative of the village.

== Economy ==
The economy is primarily agriculture and associated industries.

== Religion ==
Sambeswar Temple, an ancient temple of Shiva, is the main temple. People from nearby villages come to Sambeswar Temple for worship, inspiration and community activities.

== Facilities ==
The playground in Oranda is near the village temple. It is used for cricket, football and volleyball. Oranda'a cricket team participates in tournaments.

Sambeswar Youth Club is the backbone for entertainment. They organize cultural activities, such as dramatic performances in the premises of Sambeswar Youth Club.

Orandans depend on three ponds (Kahjuri, Gada,...) for their daily activities.

Dol Purnima and Raja are the main two festivals celebrated by the villagers.

== Education ==
Sambeswar Nodal Upper Primary School is there. There are no high schools or colleges in Oranda. Graduates go to nearby villages, such as Bali and Gurudijhatia, for higher education.
