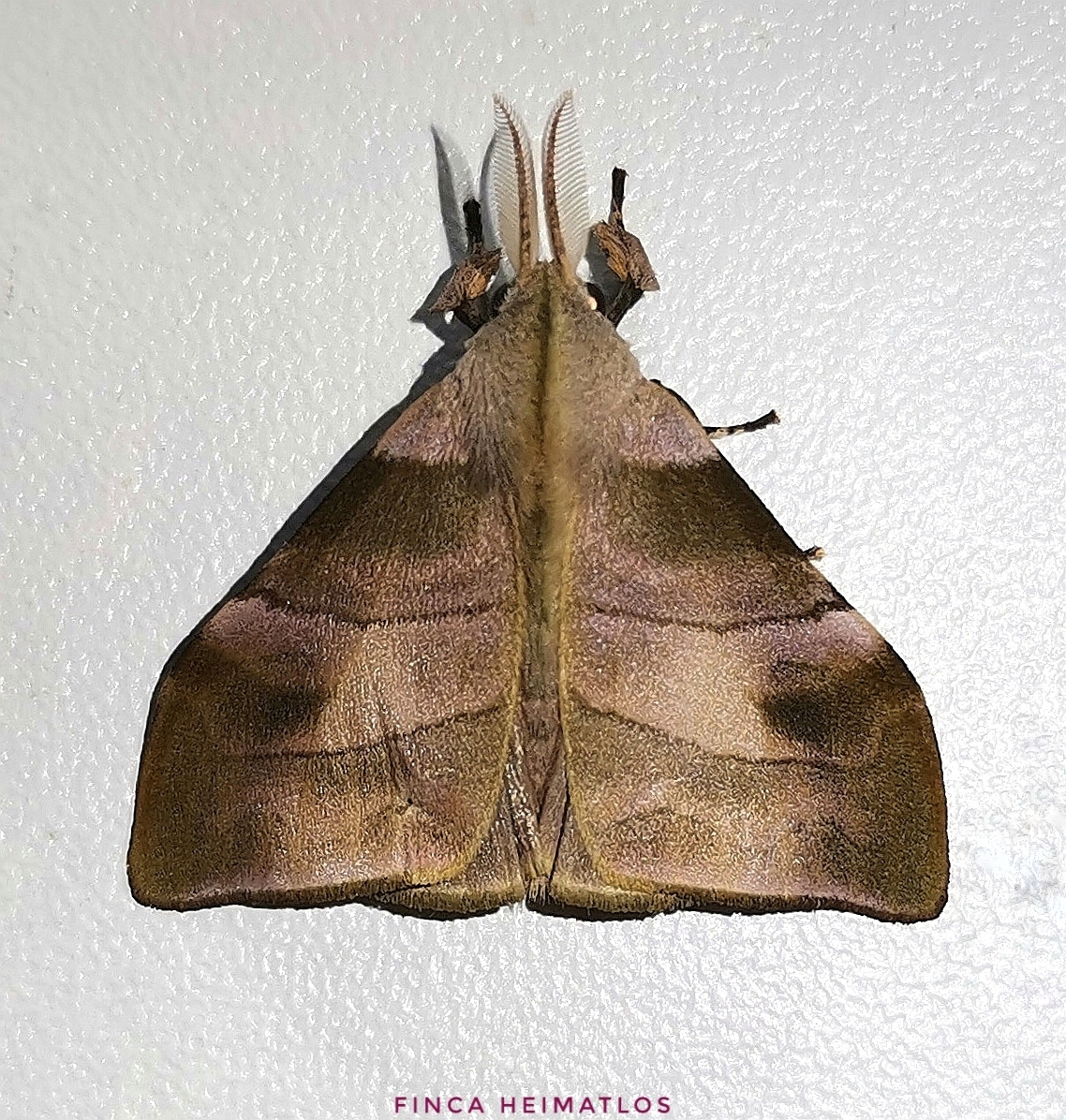
- Sarsina purpurascens in Ecuador

Scientific classification
- Domain: Eukaryota
- Kingdom: Animalia
- Phylum: Arthropoda
- Class: Insecta
- Order: Lepidoptera
- Superfamily: Noctuoidea
- Family: Erebidae
- Tribe: Lymantriini
- Genus: Sarsina; Walker, 1855

Synonyms
- Turuenna Walker, 1865; Isoctenia Felder, 1874

= Sarsina (moth) =

Genus of moths

Sarsina is a genus of moths in the subfamily Lymantriinae. The genus was erected by Francis Walker in 1855.

== Species ==
- Sarsina avertina Schaus, 1927 Mexico
- Sarsina dirphioides (Walker, 1865) French Guiana
- Sarsina electa (Schaus, 1912) Costa Rica
- Sarsina festiva (Schaus, 1912) Costa Rica
- Sarsina purpurascens Walker, 1855 Mexico
- Sarsina violascens (Herrich-Schäffer, [1856]) Brazil
- Sarsina violetta Schaus, 1927 Paraguay
