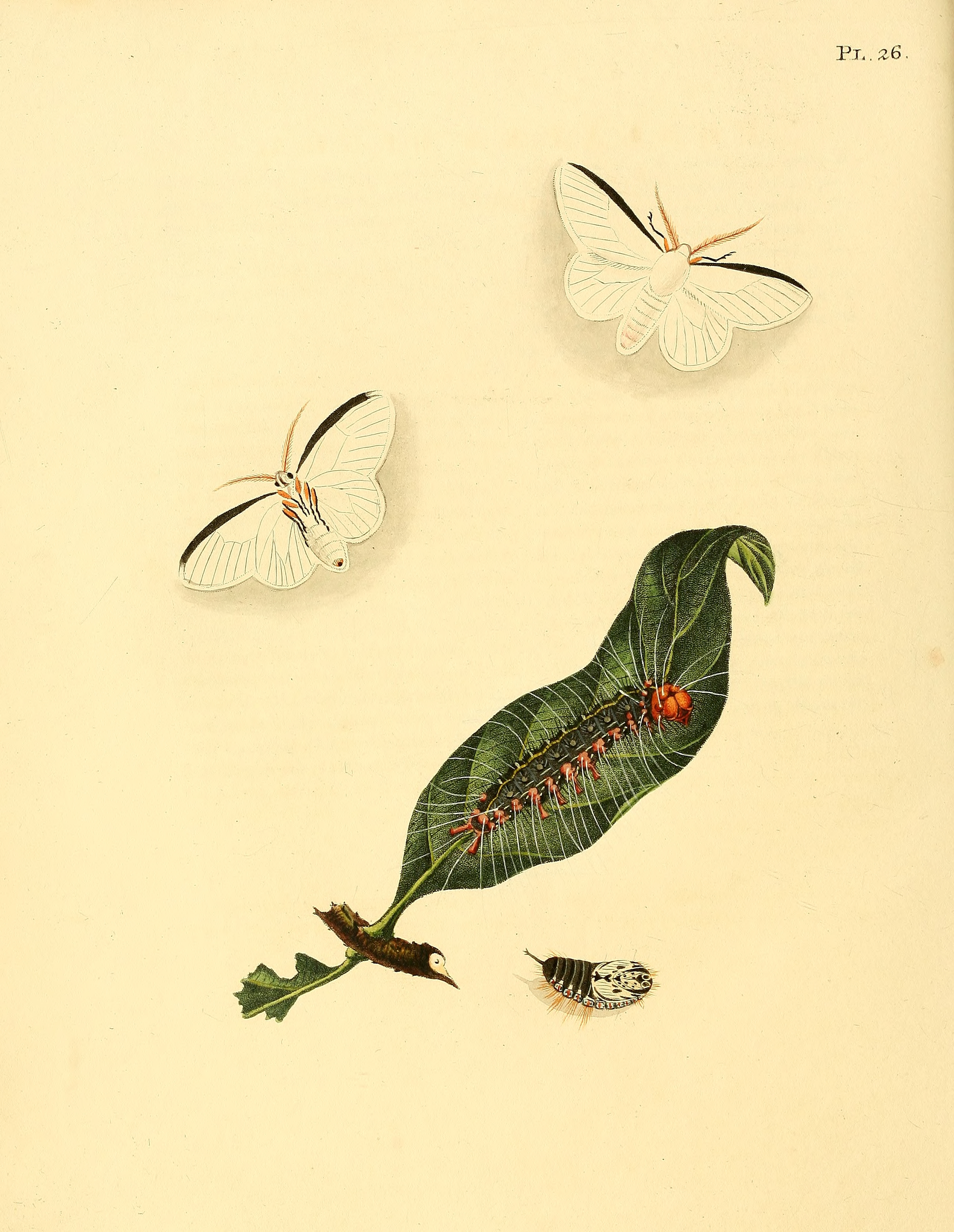
- Thagona begga

Scientific classification
- Domain: Eukaryota
- Kingdom: Animalia
- Phylum: Arthropoda
- Class: Insecta
- Order: Lepidoptera
- Superfamily: Noctuoidea
- Family: Erebidae
- Tribe: Lymantriini
- Genus: Thagona; Möschler, 1883

Synonyms
- Thagona Möschler, 1883

= Thagona =

Genus of moths

Thagona is a genus of moths in the subfamily Lymantriinae. The genus was erected by Heinrich Benno Möschler in 1883.

== Species ==
- Thagona amalita (Schaus, 1921) southern Brazil
- Thagona begga (Stoll, [1781]) Suriname
- Thagona bilinea (Schaus, 1904) Guyana
- Thagona caramata (Dognin, 1920) Ecuador
- Thagona crassilinea (Dognin, 1923) French Guiana
- Thagona distincta (H. Druce, 1906) Peru
- Thagona elmira Schaus, 1927 Bolivia
- Thagona errans (Schaus, 1920) Guatemala
- Thagona fusca (H. Druce, 1906) Peru
- Thagona grisea (Schaus, 1896) São Paulo in Brazil
- Thagona hedila (H. Druce, 1906) Peru
- Thagona impura (Schaus, 1896) São Paulo in Brazil
- Thagona limula (Dognin, 1923) Amazonas in Brazil
- Thagona lojana Schaus, 1927 Ecuador
- Thagona mentor (Dyar, 1910) French Guiana
- Thagona modificata (H. Druce, 1906) Peru
- Thagona nigrisparsus (Butler, 1878) Amazonas in Brazil
- Thagona nivea (Stoll, [1780]) Suriname
- Thagona nox (H. Druce, 1906) Peru
- Thagona ochreata (Schaus, 1915) southern Brazil
- Thagona parmata (H. Druce, 1906) Brazil
- Thagona partalba (Schaus, 1915) southern Brazil
- Thagona parthenica (Dyar, 1910) Guyana
- Thagona persimilis Draudt, 1927
- Thagona postropaea (Dyar, 1914) French Guiana
- Thagona punctifimbriata (Dognin, 1923) Colombia
- Thagona punctuada (Dognin, 1894) Ecuador
- Thagona pura (Walker, 1856) Panama, Amazonas in Brazil
- Thagona roseidorsum (Schaus, 1915) south-eastern Brazil
- Thagona rufidorsata (H. Druce, 1906) Peru
- Thagona suppura (Dyar, 1910) French Guiana
- Thagona tarsalis (Walker, 1855) Pará in Brazil
- Thagona taus (Dyar, 1910) French Guiana
- Thagona tibialis (Walker, 1855) Guatemala, Honduras, Panama
- Thagona unicolor (Schaus, 1920) Paraná in Brazil
- Thagona uniformis Möschler, 1883 Suriname, French Guiana
- Thagona unilinea (Dognin, 1916) Guyana, Amazonas in Brazil
- Thagona votis (Schaus, 1920) Guatemala
