= Icta =

Scientific classification
- Kingdom: Animalia
- Phylum: Arthropoda
- Class: Insecta
- Order: Lepidoptera
- Superfamily: Noctuoidea
- Family: Erebidae
- Tribe: Lymantriini
- Genus: Icta; Walker, 1855

Genus of moths

Icta is a genus of moths in the subfamily Lymantriinae. The genus was erected by Francis Walker in 1855. Both species are found in Australia.

== Species ==
- Icta fulviceps Walker, 1855 Australia
- Icta tanaopis Turner, 1921 Australia (Queensland)
