= Caviria =

Scientific classification
- Kingdom: Animalia
- Phylum: Arthropoda
- Clade: Pancrustacea
- Class: Insecta
- Order: Lepidoptera
- Superfamily: Noctuoidea
- Family: Erebidae
- Tribe: Lymantriini
- Genus: Caviria; Hübner, 1819

Species
- See text

Genus of moths

Caviria is a genus of moths in the subfamily Lymantriinae described by Jacob Hübner in 1819. The species are widespread throughout South America, north east India, Sri Lanka, Myanmar, the Andaman Islands, and Java.

== Description ==
Palpi minute and porrect (projecting forward). Antennae bipectinated where the branches are longer in males and short in females. Hind tibia has one pair of spurs. Forewings with vein 3 from before angle of cell. Veins 4 and 5 from angle. Vein 6 from upper angle. Veins 7, 8 and 9 are stalked. Hindwings with vein 3 from before angle of cell. Veins 4 and 5 from angle and veins 6 and 7 from upper angle.

== Species ==
- Caviria andeola
- Caviria athana
- Caviria comes
- Caviria doda
- Caviria eutelida
- Caviria hedda
- Caviria marcellina
- Caviria micans
- Caviria odriana
- Caviria regina
- Caviria sericea
- Caviria vestalis
- Caviria vinasia
