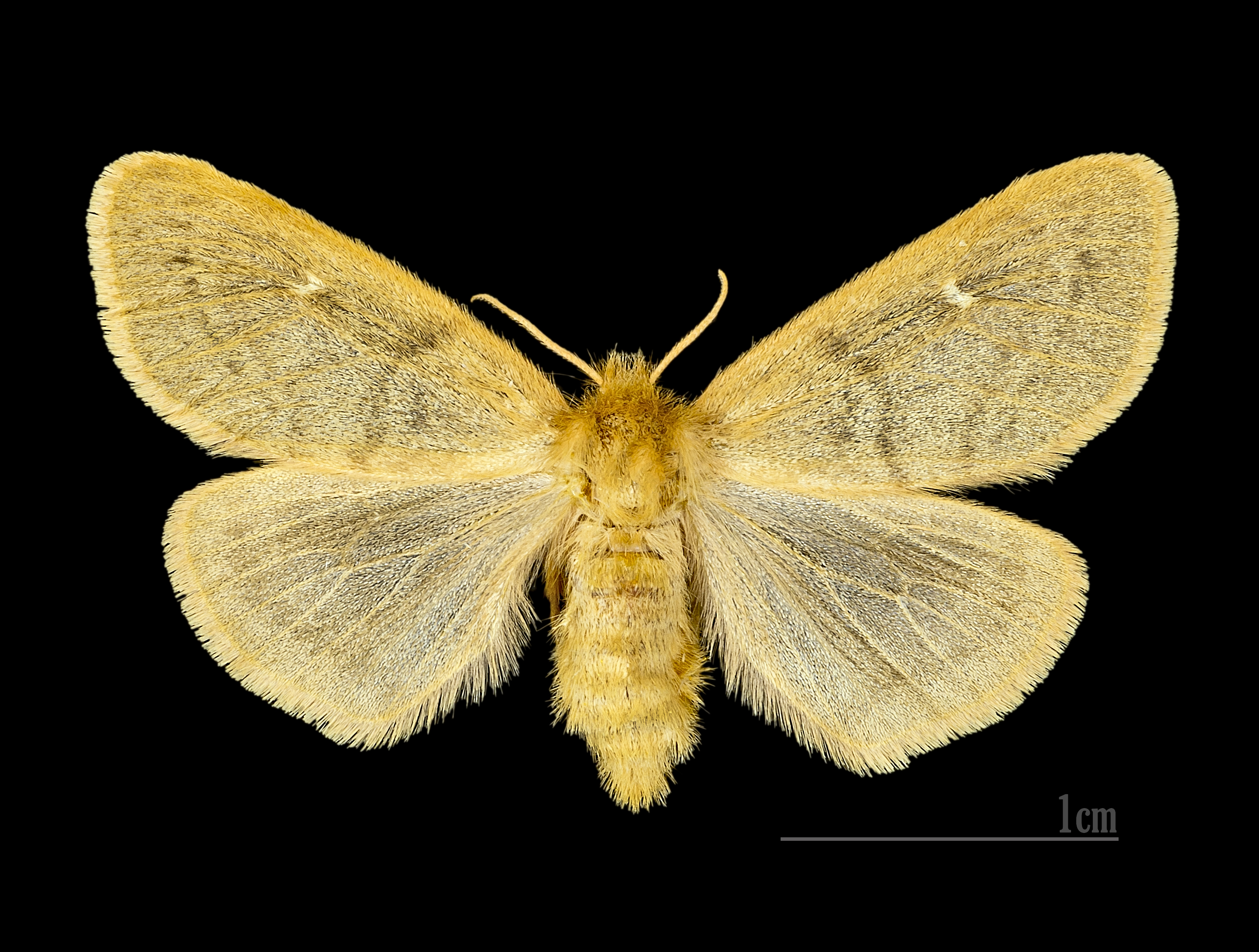
- Ocneria rubea

Scientific classification
- Kingdom: Animalia
- Phylum: Arthropoda
- Clade: Pancrustacea
- Class: Insecta
- Order: Lepidoptera
- Superfamily: Noctuoidea
- Family: Erebidae
- Tribe: Orgyiini
- Genus: Ocneria; Hübner, 1809

= Ocneria =

Genus of moths

Ocneria is a genus of tussock moths in the family Erebidae.

== Species ==
- Ocneria amabilis (Christoph, 1887)
- Ocneria detrita (Esper, 1785)
- Ocneria eos Reisser, 1962
- Ocneria rubea (Denis, & Schiffermüller, 1775)
