= Orana (moth) =

Scientific classification
- Domain: Eukaryota
- Kingdom: Animalia
- Phylum: Arthropoda
- Class: Insecta
- Order: Lepidoptera
- Superfamily: Noctuoidea
- Family: Erebidae
- Tribe: Lymantriini
- Genus: Orana; Griveaud, 1976

Genus of moths

Orana is a genus of moths in the subfamily Lymantriinae. The genus was erected by Paul Griveaud in 1976.

== Species ==
- Orana delicata Griveaud, 1977
- Orana grammodes (Hering, 1926)
- Orana palea Griveaud, 1977
