= Kunusara =

Scientific classification
- Domain: Eukaryota
- Kingdom: Animalia
- Phylum: Arthropoda
- Class: Insecta
- Order: Lepidoptera
- Superfamily: Noctuoidea
- Family: Erebidae
- Tribe: Lymantriini
- Genus: Kunusara; Nye, 1980
- Species: K. fontainei

Binomial name
- Kunusara fontainei (Collenette, 1960)

Synonyms
- Generic: Sankurua Collenette, 1960; Specific: Sankurua fontainei Collenette, 1960

Genus of moths

Kunusara is a monotypic moth genus in the subfamily Lymantriinae described by Nye in 1980. Its only species, Kunusara fontainei, was first described by Cyril Leslie Collenette in 1960. It is found in the Congo Basin.
