= Parapellucens =

Scientific classification
- Kingdom: Animalia
- Phylum: Arthropoda
- Clade: Pancrustacea
- Class: Insecta
- Order: Lepidoptera
- Superfamily: Noctuoidea
- Family: Erebidae
- Tribe: Incertae sedis
- Genus: Parapellucens; Holloway, 1999

Genus of moths

Parapellucens is a genus of tussock moths in the family Erebidae.

== Species ==
The following species are included in the genus.

- Parapellucens aphrasta Collenette, 1932
- Parapellucens tegulatorii Holloway, 1999
