= Cispia =

Scientific classification
- Kingdom: Animalia
- Phylum: Arthropoda
- Clade: Pancrustacea
- Class: Insecta
- Order: Lepidoptera
- Superfamily: Noctuoidea
- Family: Erebidae
- Subfamily: Lymantriinae
- Tribe: Lymantriini
- Genus: Cispia; Walker, 1855

Synonyms
- Caltura Moore, 1879

Genus of moths

Cispia venosa in Vietnam

Cispia is a genus of tussock moths in the family Erebidae. It was described by Francis Walker in 1855. They are found in India, Bhutan, Sri Lanka, China and southeast Asia (Thailand, Laos, Vietnam).

== Description ==
Palpi porrect (projecting forward) where the second joint is long and hairy and third joint minute. Some have minute palpi though. Antennae bipectinate (comb like on both sides) in both sexes with long branches. Forewings with vein 3 to 5 from close to angle of cell. Vein 6 from upper angle. Veins 7 to 10 are stalked, where vein 10 being given off from nearer the cell or from the same point as vein 7. Hindwings with vein 3 from before angle and vein 5 from above it.

== Species ==
The following species are included in the genus:

- Cispia alba Moore, 1879
- Cispia charma Swinhoe, 1899
- Cispia cretacea Zhao, 1984
- Cispia dipyrena Collenette, 1947
- Cispia fasciata Semper, 1899
- Cispia grisea Semper, 1899
- Cispia griseola Zhao, 1987
- Cispia joiceyi Collenette, 1930
- Cispia lunata Zhao, 1984
- Cispia ochrophaea Collenette, 1932
- Cispia polygramma Collenette, 1951
- Cispia punctifascia Walker, 1855
- Cispia venosa Walker, 1862
