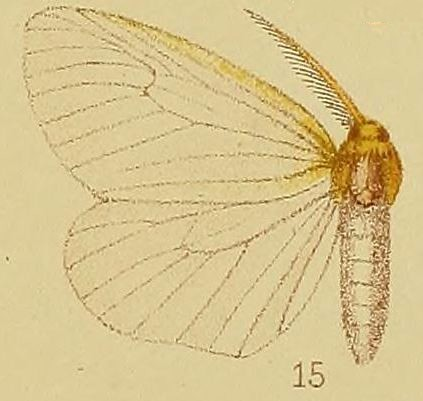
- Olapa fulviceps

Scientific classification
- Domain: Eukaryota
- Kingdom: Animalia
- Phylum: Arthropoda
- Class: Insecta
- Order: Lepidoptera
- Superfamily: Noctuoidea
- Family: Erebidae
- Tribe: Lymantriini
- Genus: Olapa; Walker, 1855

Synonyms
- Antiphella Walker, 1856; Antiphelea Lucas, 1900; Pseudogenusa Rebel, 1914; Poneopirga Berio, 1937

= Olapa (moth) =

Genus of moths

Olapa is a genus of moths in the family Erebidae. The genus was erected by Francis Walker in 1855.

== Species ==
- Olapa atricosta (Hampson, 1909)
- Olapa bipunctata (Holland, 1920) Congo
- Olapa brachycerca Collenette, 1936 Angola
- Olapa fulviceps Hampson, 1910 Congo
- Olapa furva Hampson, 1905 southern Africa
- Olapa ituri Collenette, 1931 Congo
- Olapa jacksoni Collenette, 1957 Uganda
- Olapa leptomita Collenette, 1931 Uganda
- Olapa macrocerca Collenette, 1936 Angola
- Olapa melanocera Hampson, 1909
- Olapa nigribasis Janse, 1917 Zimbabwe
- Olapa nigricosta Hampson, 1905 Tanzania, southern Africa
- Olapa notia Collenette, 1959 Madagascar
- Olapa nuda (Holland, 1897)
- Olapa phaeospila Collenette, 1953 western Africa
- Olapa sobo Collenette, 1960 Nigeria
- Olapa tavetensis (Holland, 1892) eastern Africa
- Olapa terina Collenette, 1959 Madagascar
