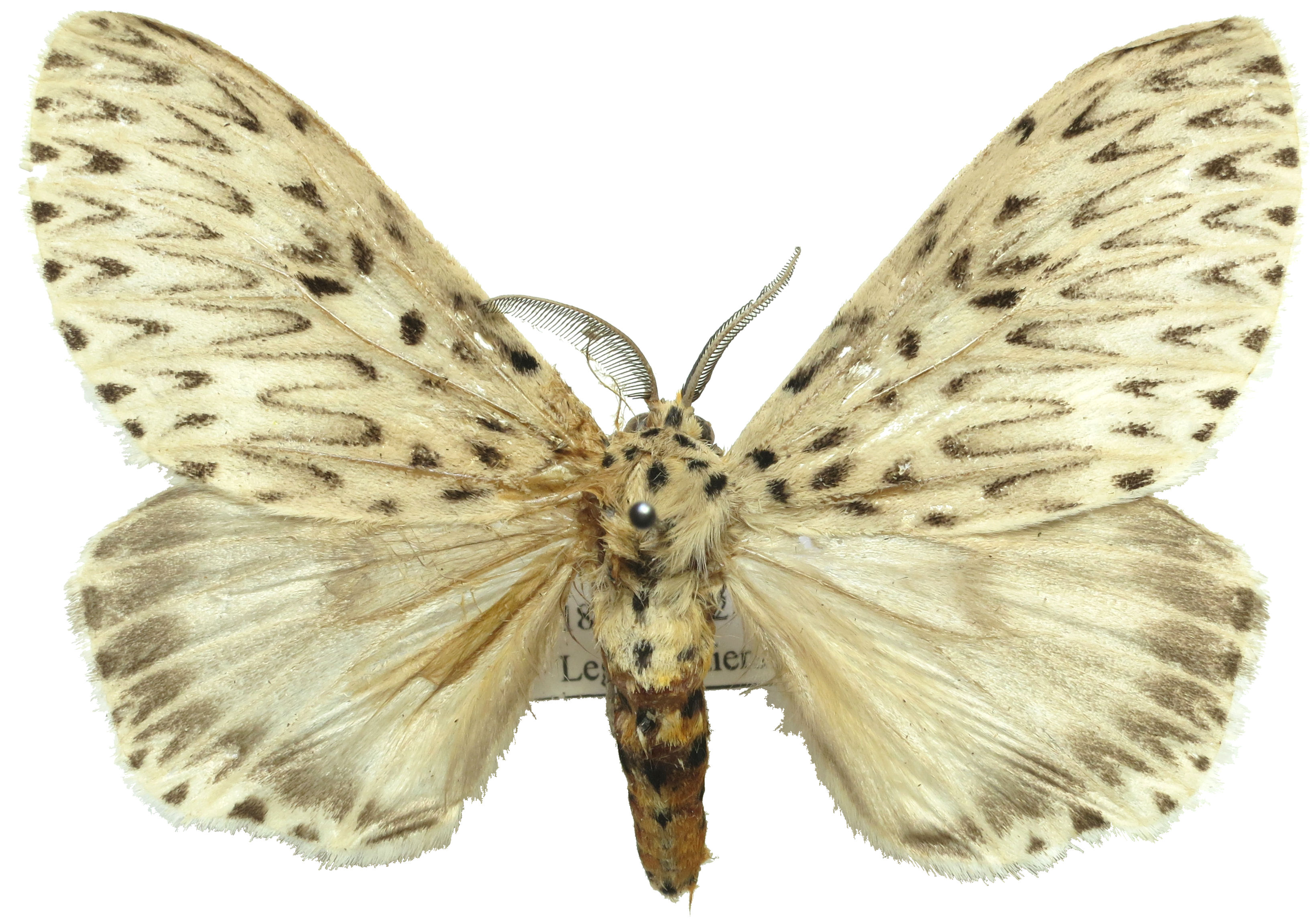
- Imaus munda

Scientific classification
- Kingdom: Animalia
- Phylum: Arthropoda
- Class: Insecta
- Order: Lepidoptera
- Superfamily: Noctuoidea
- Family: Erebidae
- Tribe: Lymantriini
- Genus: Imaus; Moore, 1879

Synonyms
- Usimbara Collenette, 1955

= Imaus (moth) =

Genus of moths

Imaus is a genus of tussock moths in the family Erebidae. The genus was erected by Frederic Moore in 1879.

== Species ==
The following species are included in the genus:

- Imaus lata Holland, 1893
- Imaus munda Walker, 1855
