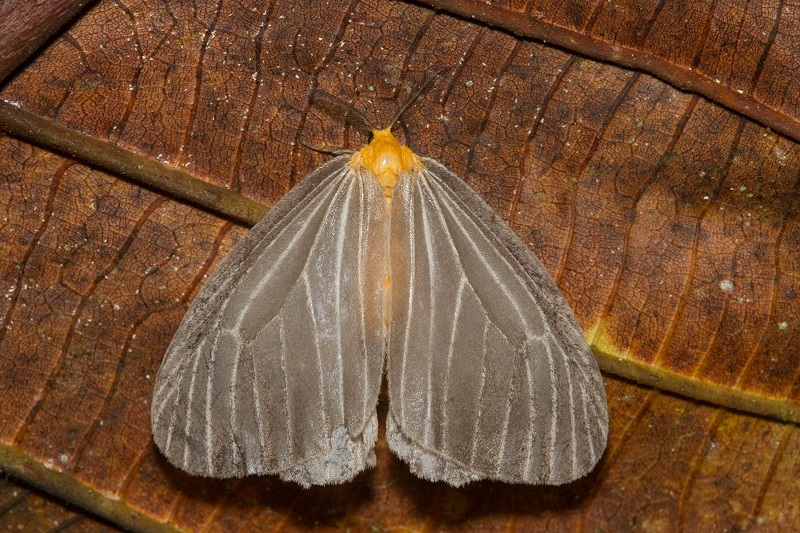
- Birnara bicolor in Malaysia

Scientific classification
- Kingdom: Animalia
- Phylum: Arthropoda
- Clade: Pancrustacea
- Class: Insecta
- Order: Lepidoptera
- Superfamily: Noctuoidea
- Family: Erebidae
- Genus: Birnara; Butler, 1879
- Species: B. bicolor

Binomial name
- Birnara bicolor Walker, 1855

Synonyms
- Pantana bicolor Walker, 1855; Etobema lineosa Walker, 1865; Birnara nubila Butler, 1879; Pantana semilucida Swinhoe, 1903

= Birnara =

Genus of moths

Birnara is a monotypic tussock moth genus in the family Erebidae erected by Arthur Gardiner Butler in 1879. Its only species, Birnara bicolor, was first described by Francis Walker in 1855. It is found in Sundaland in Southeast Asia.

== Habitat and Distribution ==
The sole species is found across Sundaland, being present on the Islands of Borneo, Sumatra and Java, as well as on Mainland Malaysia (up to the Thai Border). It is probably montane or found in the vicinity of hills and relatively uncommon. Specimens have been taken between 1200m and 1660m by day on Mt. Kinabalu.

== Description ==
These moths possess a dull orange body, with darker gray forewings, contrasting lighter hindwings that are delineated with paler veins.
