= Suarezia (crustacean) =

Scientific classification
- Kingdom: Animalia
- Phylum: Arthropoda
- Class: Malacostraca
- Order: Isopoda
- Suborder: Oniscidea
- Family: Scleropactidae
- Genus: Suarezia; Budde-Lund, 1904

Species
- Suarezia differens Barnard, 1959; Suarezia heterodoxa (Dollfus, 1895)

Genus of woodlice

Suarezia is a genus of woodlice, in the family Scleropactidae, containing the two species Suarezia differens and Suarezia heterodoxa, both of which are endemic to Madagascar.
