= Salvatgea =

Scientific classification
- Domain: Eukaryota
- Kingdom: Animalia
- Phylum: Arthropoda
- Class: Insecta
- Order: Lepidoptera
- Superfamily: Noctuoidea
- Family: Erebidae
- Subfamily: Lymantriinae
- Genus: Salvatgea; Griveaud, 1977

Synonyms
- Suarezia Hering, 1926

Genus of moths

Salvatgea is a genus of moths in the subfamily Lymantriinae. The genus was erected by Paul Griveaud in 1977.

== Species ==
Some species of this genus are:

- Salvatgea beondroka Griveaud, 1977
- Salvatgea bipuncta (Hering, 1926)
- Salvatgea lasioma (Collenette, 1959)
- Salvatgea pauliani Griveaud, 1977
- Salvatgea reducta Griveaud, 1977
- Salvatgea tsaratanana Griveaud, 1977
