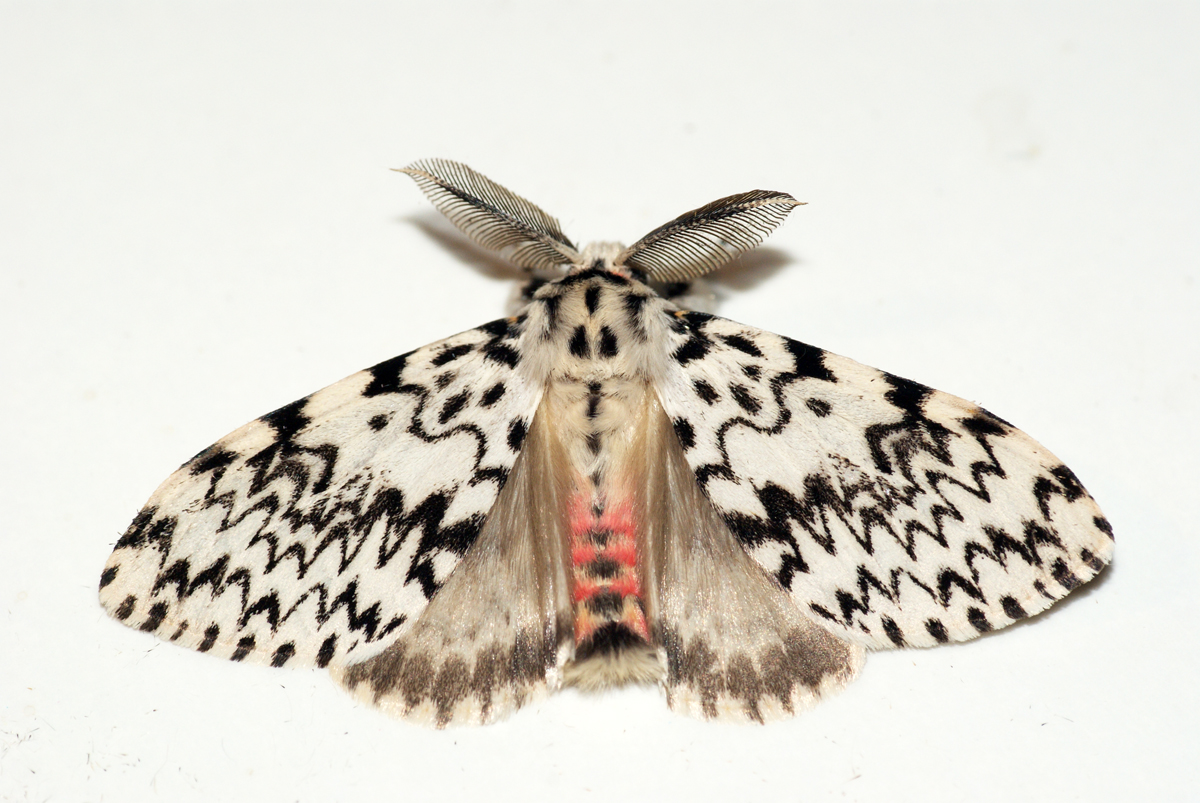

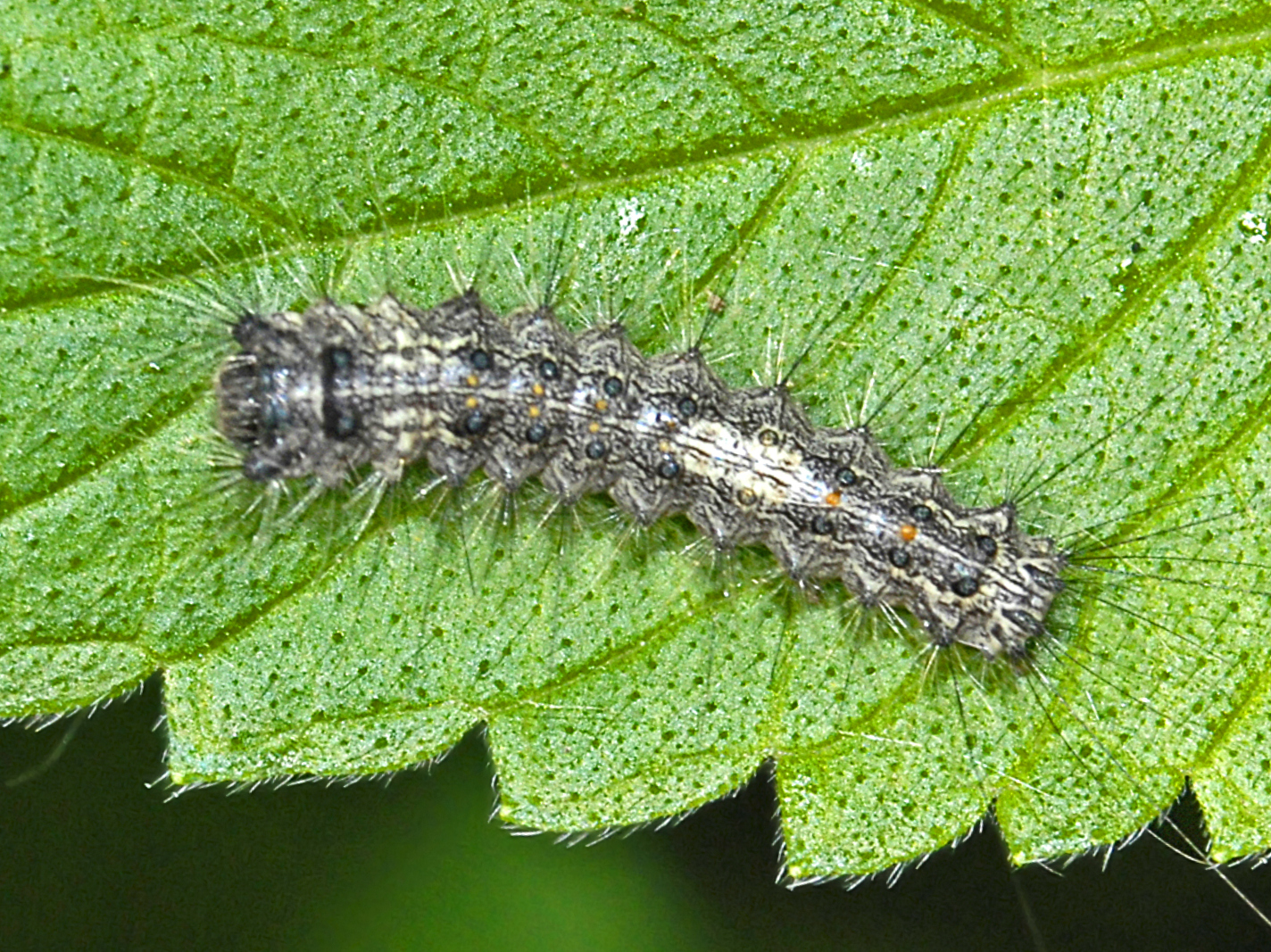
- imago and caterpillar of Lymantria monacha, Lymantriini

Scientific classification
- Kingdom: Animalia
- Phylum: Arthropoda
- Clade: Pancrustacea
- Class: Insecta
- Order: Lepidoptera
- Superfamily: Noctuoidea
- Family: Erebidae
- Subfamily: Lymantriinae
- Tribe: Lymantriini; Hampson, 1893

= Lymantriini =

Tribe of moths

Lymantriini (sometimes misspelled as Lymantrini) is a tribe of moths of the family Erebidae. This tribe is a group of polyphagous moths that reside mostly in the tropical regions of Afro-Eurasia but also North America.

== Description ==
Within the family, Lymantriini is distinguished from other tribes by dark, usually zig-zag (sometimes crescent-shaped) banding on the forewings, V-shaped marks on the wing as well as a discal spot and an orbicular spot. It is also characterized by the lack of an areola.

Lymantriini generally are not particularly native to any one area, being found in both the Nearctic and Palearctic zones.

== Taxonomy ==
The tribe was originally described by entomologist Douglas C. Ferguson as one of two tribes (the other Orgyiini). A 2006 paper by J.D. Holloway distinguished three new tribes from Lymantriini — Nygmiini, Leucomini and Arctornithini. In doing this, Holloway acknowledges that Lymantriini is "possibly the most weakly defined of those presented here ... [it] lacks all the strongly definitive features of the other tribes." The genus Lymantria (Hübner) is the most prominent member of the tribe.

== Genera ==
The tribe includes the following genera. This list may be incomplete.

- Caviria
- Cispia
- Crorema
- Dura
- Imaus
- Lymantica
- Lymantria
- Olapa
- Parocneria
- Psilochira
- Kunusara
- Sarsina
- Thagona
