= List of moths of Australia (Lymantriidae) =

Partial list of Australian moths

This is a list of the Australian moth species of the family Lymantriidae. It also acts as an index to the species articles and forms part of the full List of moths of Australia.

- Acyphas amphideta (Turner, 1902)
- Acyphas chionitis (Turner, 1902)
- Acyphas fulviceps (Walker, 1855)
- Acyphas leptotypa (Turner, 1904)
- Acyphas pelodes (Lower, 1893)
- Acyphas semiochrea (Herrich-Schäffer, 1855)
- Arctornis submarginata (Walker, 1855)
- Calliteara farenoides (T.P. Lucas, 1892)
- Calliteara pura (T.P. Lucas, 1892)
- Dura niveus (Bethune-Baker, 1904)
- Dura ochrias (Turner, 1906)
- Euproctis acatharta (Turner, 1906)
- Euproctis actor Turner, 1920
- Euproctis aganopa Turner, 1921
- Euproctis aliena (Butler, 1886)
- Euproctis arrogans (T.P. Lucas, 1900)
- Euproctis baliolalis (Swinhoe, 1892)
- Euproctis crocea (Walker, 1865)
- Euproctis edwardsii (Newman, 1856)
- Euproctis emprepes Turner, 1931
- Euproctis epaxia Turner, 1906
- Euproctis epidela Turner, 1906
- Euproctis euthysana (Turner, 1902)
- Euproctis fimbriata (T.P. Lucas, 1891)
- Euproctis galactopis (Turner, 1902)
- Euproctis habrostola Turner, 1902
- Euproctis holoxutha Turner, 1902
- Euproctis hymnolis Turner, 1921
- Euproctis idonea Swinhoe, 1903
- Euproctis leonina (Turner, 1903)
- Euproctis limbalis (Herrich-Schäffer, 1855)
- Euproctis lucifuga (T.P. Lucas, 1892)
- Euproctis lutea (Fabricius, 1775)
- Euproctis marginalis (Walker, 1855)
- Euproctis melanorrhanta (Turner, 1931)
- Euproctis melanosoma (Butler, 1882)
- Euproctis niphobola Turner, 1902
- Euproctis ochroneura Turner, 1931
- Euproctis panabra (Turner, 1902)
- Euproctis paradoxa (Butler, 1886)
- Euproctis pyraustis (Meyrick, 1891)
- Euproctis semifusca (Walker, 1869)
- Euproctis stenomorpha Turner, 1921
- Euproctis subnobilis (Snellen, 1881)
- Euproctis trispila (Turner, 1921)
- Euproctis urbis Strand, 1925
- Euproctis xuthoptera (Turner, 1921)
- Euproctis xuthosterna (Turner, 1924)
- Euzora collucens (T.P. Lucas, 1890)
- Habrophylla euryzona (Lower, 1902)
- Habrophylla pycnadelpha (Lower, 1903)
- Habrophylla retinopepla (Lower, 1905)
- Icta fulviceps Walker, 1855
- Icta tanaopis Turner, 1921
- Iropoca rotundata (Walker, 1855)
- Laelia furva Turner, 1931
- Laelia obsoleta (Fabricius, 1775)
- Leptocneria binotata Butler, 1886
- Leptocneria reducta (Walker, 1855)
- Lymantria antennata Walker, 1855
- Lymantria lunata (Stoll, 1782)
- Lymantria nephrographa Turner, 1915
- Lymantria pelospila Turner, 1915
- Olene cookiensis (Strand, 1915)
- Olene dryina (Lower, 1900)
- Olene mendosa Hübner, 1823
- Oligeria hemicalla (Lower, 1905)
- Orgyia australis Walker, 1855
- Orgyia papuana Riotte, 1976
- Psalis pennatula (Fabricius, 1793)
- Teia anartoides Walker, 1855
- Teia athlophora (Turner, 1921)
