= Teia (disambiguation) =

Teia may refer to the following:

- Teia, the last Ostrogothic king in Italy
- Teià, a municipality in Maresme county, Catalonia, Spain
- Teia (moth), a moth genus in the family Erebidae
  - Teia anartoides, the painted apple moth
- Teia Maru, a Japanese ship of World War II

== See also ==
- Theia (disambiguation)
