= Thea =

Thea may refer to:

- Thea (name), a given name
- Ancient Greek term for goddess, including an alternative spelling of Theia
- Thea, the former name of the tea plant genus, now included in Camellia
- Thea, a village in the multiple unit Messatida, Achaea, Greece
- Thea (award), the annual award from the Themed Entertainment Association
- Thea (New-Gen), a Marvel Comics New-Gen character
- Thea (TV series), a 1993 short-lived television series starring Thea Vidale and Brandy Norwood
- Tampa-Hillsborough Expressway Authority, a regional expressway authority based in Hillsborough County, Florida
- Another word for the mythological animal theow
- "Thea", a song by Goldfrapp from Tales of Us
- Theia (planet), a planet hypothesized to have collided with Earth 4.5 billion years ago to form the moon
- Thea, a video game series beginning with Thea: The Awakening

== See also ==
- Theia (disambiguation)
- Thia (disambiguation)
