= Sphrageidus xanthorrhoea =

Scientific classification
- Domain: Eukaryota
- Kingdom: Animalia
- Phylum: Arthropoda
- Class: Insecta
- Order: Lepidoptera
- Superfamily: Noctuoidea
- Family: Erebidae
- Genus: Sphrageidus
- Species: S. xanthorrhoea

Binomial name
- Sphrageidus xanthorrhoea (Kollar, 1848)

Synonyms
- Liparis xanthorrhoea Kollar, 1848; Euproctis flavonigra Moore, 1879; Euproctis subdita Moore, 1879; Euproctis subnigra Moore, 1879; Arctornis flavonigra Swinhoe, 1922; Arctornis xanthorrhoea Swinhoe, 1922

Species of moth

Sphrageidus xanthorrhoea is a moth of the family Erebidae first described by Vincenz Kollar in 1848. It is found in India, Sri Lanka, Java and Indonesia. It was once classified under the genus Euproctis, where it is accepted by some authors.

The caterpillar is known to feed on agricultural crops like Gossypium, Helianthus annuus, Lagerstroemia indica, Oryza sativa, Panicum maximum, Pennisetum americanum, Phaseolus lunatus, Ricinus communis, Saccharum officinarum, Sorghum bicolor, Vigna unguiculata, Andropogon sorghum, Tamarix dioica, Cajanus cajan, Eleusine coracana and Coffea.
