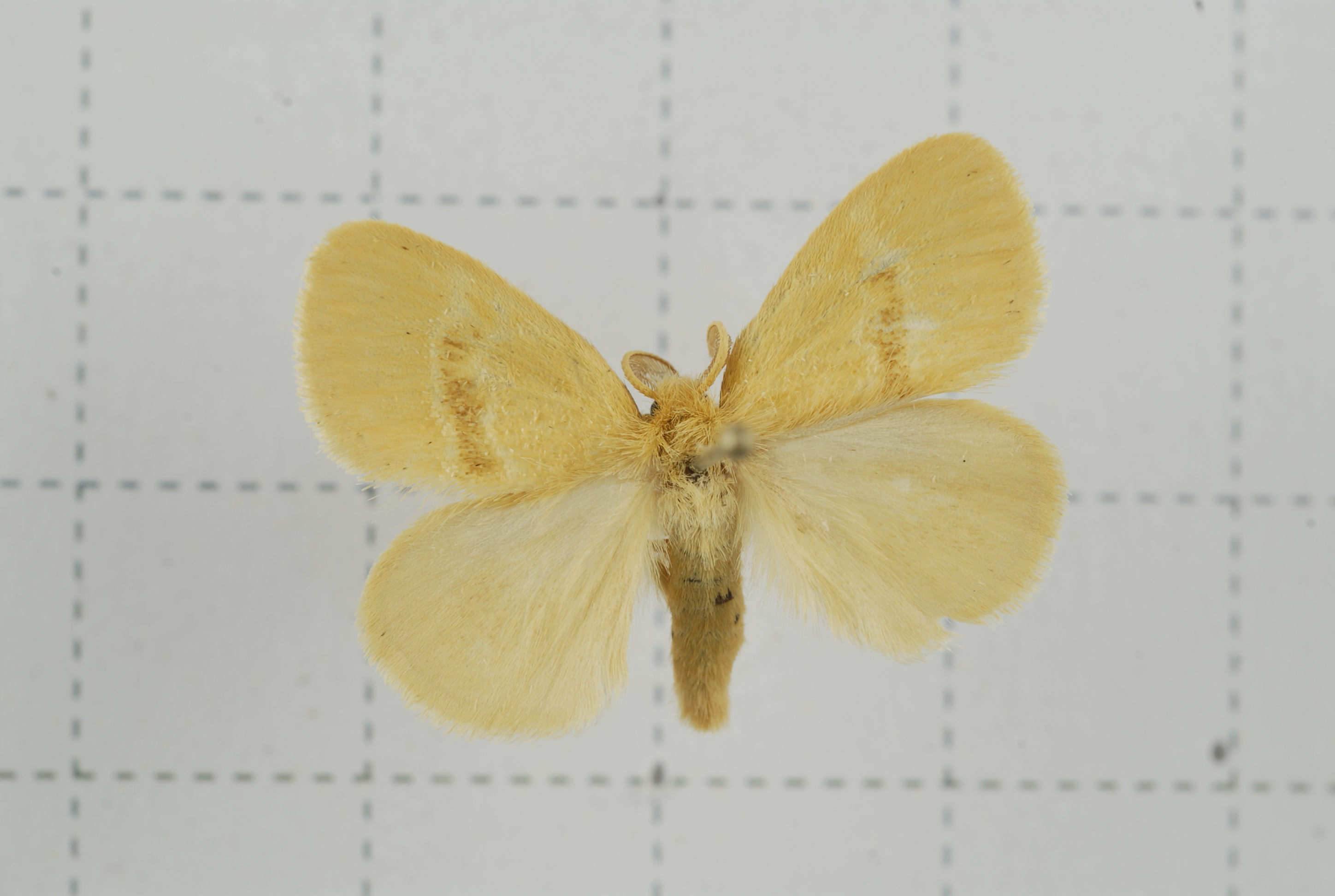
- Euproctis latifascia suisharyonis

Scientific classification
- Kingdom: Animalia
- Phylum: Arthropoda
- Class: Insecta
- Order: Lepidoptera
- Superfamily: Noctuoidea
- Family: Erebidae
- Genus: Euproctis
- Species: E. latifascia

Binomial name
- Euproctis latifascia Walker, 1855

= Euproctis latifascia =

Species of moth

Euproctis latifascia is a moth of the family Erebidae first described by Francis Walker in 1855. It is found in India, Sri Lanka and Taiwan.

The caterpillar is an important pest attacking old leaves of tea.

== Subspecies ==
Two subspecies are recognized including the nominate.

- Euproctis latifascia latifascia Walker, 1855
- Euproctis latifascia suisharyonis Strand, 1914
