= Euproctis rhoda =

Scientific classification
- Domain: Eukaryota
- Kingdom: Animalia
- Phylum: Arthropoda
- Class: Insecta
- Order: Lepidoptera
- Superfamily: Noctuoidea
- Family: Erebidae
- Genus: Euproctis
- Species: E. rhoda

Binomial name
- Euproctis rhoda (Moore, 1879)

Synonyms
- Artaxa howra Moore, 1879; Artaxa obsoleta Hampson, 1891; Artaxa rhoda C. Swinhoe, 1891; Nygmia howra C. Swinhoe, 1923

Species of moth

Euproctis rhoda is a moth of the family Erebidae first described by Frederic Moore in 1879. It is sometimes classified as a subspecies of Euproctis howra. It is found in India, Sri Lanka, Myanmar, the Andaman Islands and Australia.

The caterpillar is known to feed on Cinnamomum zeylanicum, Terminalia paniculata, Memecylon edule, Ziziphus, Coffea and Albizia.
