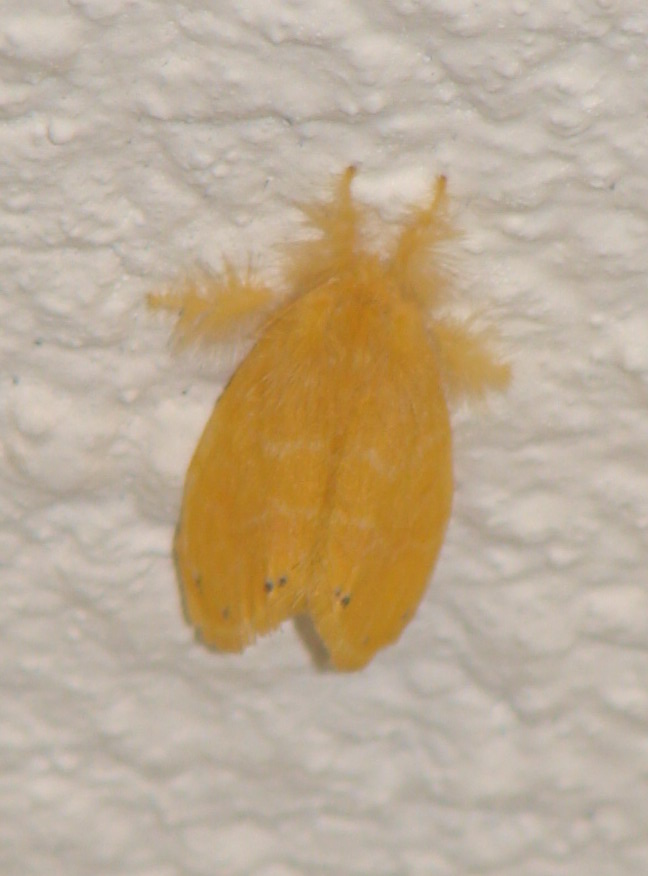

Scientific classification
- Kingdom: Animalia
- Phylum: Arthropoda
- Class: Insecta
- Order: Lepidoptera
- Superfamily: Noctuoidea
- Family: Erebidae
- Genus: Euproctis
- Species: E. varians

Binomial name
- Euproctis varians (Walker, 1855)

Synonyms
- Artaxa varians Walker, 1855; Euproctis varians tjamba Collenette, 1947; Artaxa varians Moore, 1878; Euproctis varians Collenette, 1932

= Euproctis varians =

Species of moth

Euproctis varians is a moth of the family Erebidae first described by Francis Walker in 1855. It is found in India, Sri Lanka, the Maldives, Celebes and China.

The caterpillar is known to feed on Ricinus communis and Brassica oleracea.
