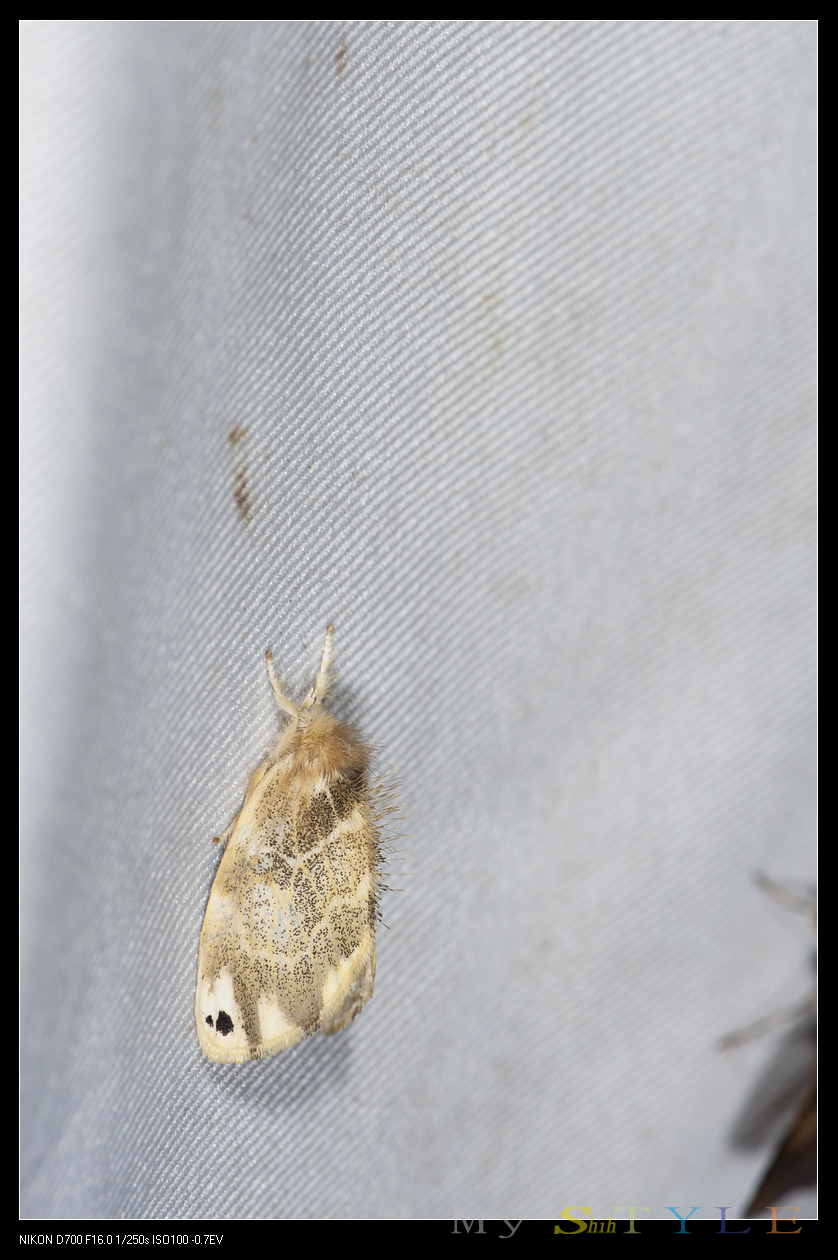

Scientific classification
- Domain: Eukaryota
- Kingdom: Animalia
- Phylum: Arthropoda
- Class: Insecta
- Order: Lepidoptera
- Superfamily: Noctuoidea
- Family: Erebidae
- Genus: Euproctis
- Species: E. kanshireia

Binomial name
- Euproctis kanshireia Wileman, 1910

= Euproctis kanshireia =

Species of moth

Euproctis kanshireia is a moth in the family Erebidae. It is found in Taiwan.
