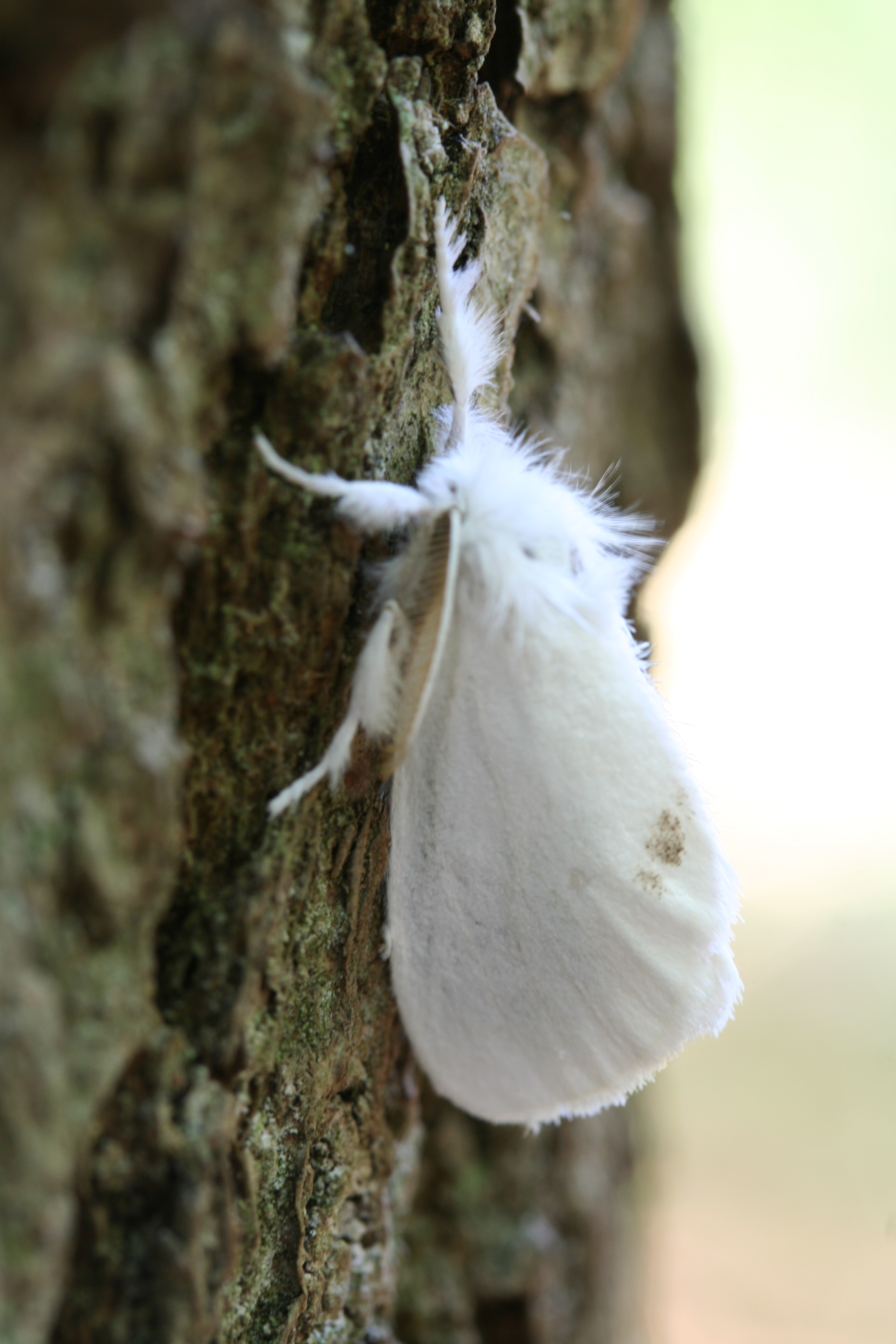
- Sphrageidus similis

Scientific classification
- Domain: Eukaryota
- Kingdom: Animalia
- Phylum: Arthropoda
- Class: Insecta
- Order: Lepidoptera
- Superfamily: Noctuoidea
- Family: Erebidae
- Tribe: Nygmiini
- Genus: Sphrageidus; Maes, 1984

= Sphrageidus =

Genus of moths

Sphrageidus is a genus of tussock moths in the family Erebidae. It is considered a synonym of the related genus Euproctis by some authors, but still recognized as valid by others (e.g.), and supported as distinct in molecular phylogenetic studies.

== Species ==
- Sphrageidus fervida (Walker, 1863)
- Sphrageidus incommoda (Butler, 1882)
- Sphrageidus lemuria (Hering, 1926)
- Sphrageidus perixesta (Collenette, 1954)
- Sphrageidus producta (Walker, 1863)
- Sphrageidus pusillima (Strand, 1912)
- Sphrageidus putilla (Saalmüller, 1884)
- Sphrageidus similis (Füssli, 1775)
- Sphrageidus simlensis (Gupta, 1986)
- Sphrageidus virguncula (Walker, 1855)
- Sphrageidus xanthorrhoea (Kollar, 1848)
