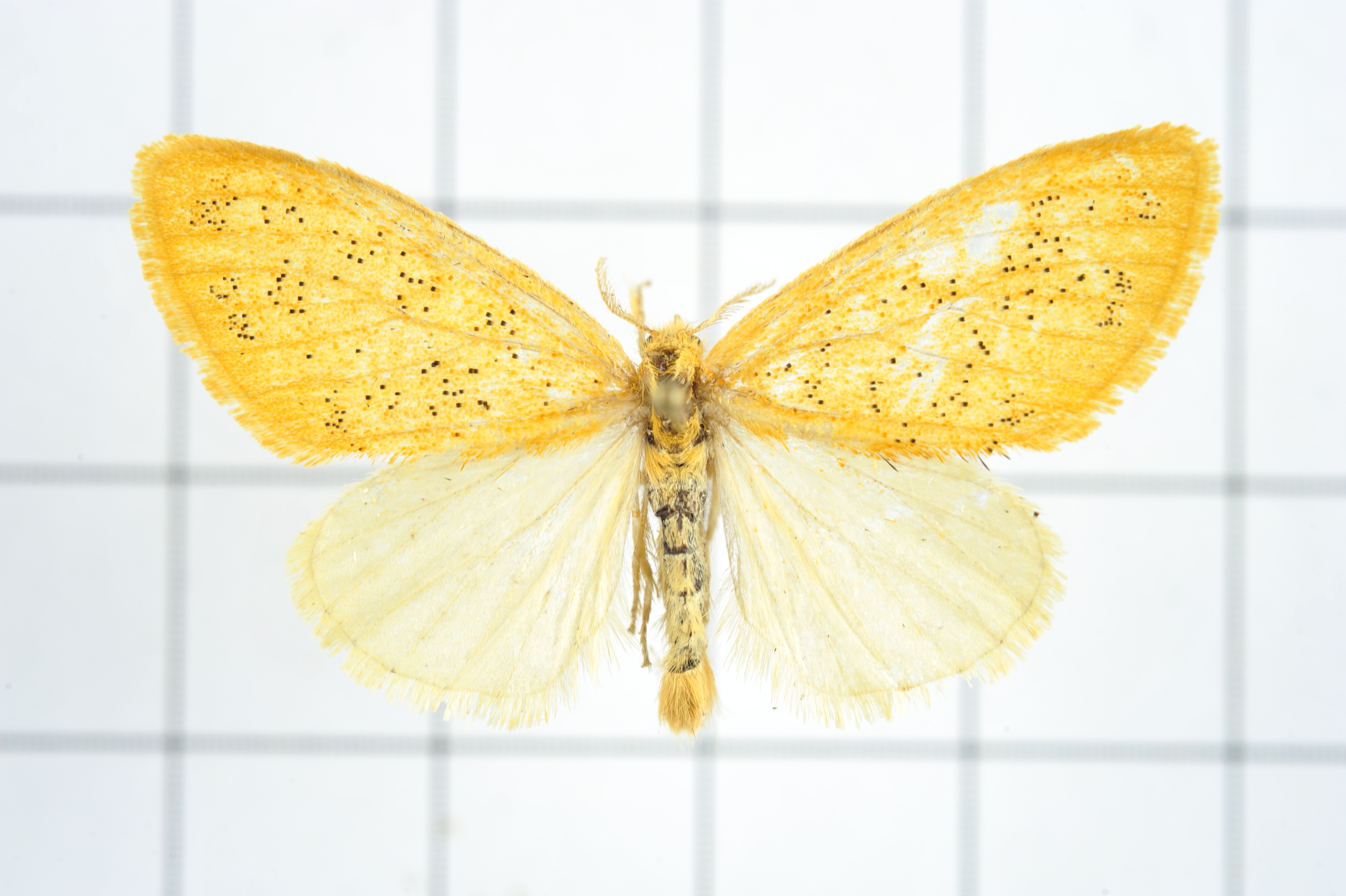

Scientific classification
- Domain: Eukaryota
- Kingdom: Animalia
- Phylum: Arthropoda
- Class: Insecta
- Order: Lepidoptera
- Superfamily: Noctuoidea
- Family: Erebidae
- Genus: Euproctis
- Species: E. pulverea

Binomial name
- Euproctis pulverea (Leech, 1888)

Synonyms
- Artaxa pulverea Leech, 1888; Euproctis argentata Leech, 1899; Porthesia riukiuana Matsumura, 1927

= Euproctis pulverea =

Species of moth

Euproctis pulverea is a moth of the subfamily Lymantriinae first described by John Henry Leech in 1888. It is found in Japan, Korea and Taiwan.

The larvae feed on Eurya japonica, Prunus and Rosa species.

== Taxonomy ==
A second species with the same name was described in 1900 by George Hampson (Euproctis pulverea) from the Australian Christmas Island. No alternative name has been assigned to that species.
