= Theia (disambiguation) =

Theia is a Titan in Greek mythology.

Theia or THEIA may also refer to:

== Science and technology ==
- Theia (hypothetical planet), a hypothesized planet involved in the creation of the Moon
- Theia Mons, a large shield volcano on Venus
- Eclipse Theia, an integrated development environment framework
- Telescope for Habitable Exoplanets and Interstellar/Intergalactic Astronomy, a proposed space telescope

== Other uses ==
- Theia (horse), a racehorse
- Theia (Oceanid), a minor deity in Greek mythology
- Theia (singer), a singer from New Zealand
- Teia, last king of the Ostrogoths in Italy
- "Theia", a song by King Gizzard & the Lizard Wizard from The Silver Cord, 2023

== See also ==
- Teia (disambiguation)
- Thea (disambiguation)
- Thia (disambiguation)
