= Euproctis flavinata =

Scientific classification
- Kingdom: Animalia
- Phylum: Arthropoda
- Class: Insecta
- Order: Lepidoptera
- Superfamily: Noctuoidea
- Family: Erebidae
- Genus: Euproctis
- Species: E. flavinata

Binomial name
- Euproctis flavinata Walker, 1865

Species of moth

Euproctis flavinata is a moth of the family Erebidae first described by Francis Walker in 1865. It is found in China and Hong Kong.

The caterpillar feeds on Camellia oleifera.
