= Euproctis mayottensis =

Scientific classification
- Domain: Eukaryota
- Kingdom: Animalia
- Phylum: Arthropoda
- Class: Insecta
- Order: Lepidoptera
- Superfamily: Noctuoidea
- Family: Erebidae
- Genus: Euproctis
- Species: E. mayottensis

Binomial name
- Euproctis mayottensis Collenette, 1956

Species of moth

Euproctis mayottensis is a moth of the family Erebidae first described by Cyril Leslie Collenette in 1956. It is found in Mayotte.
