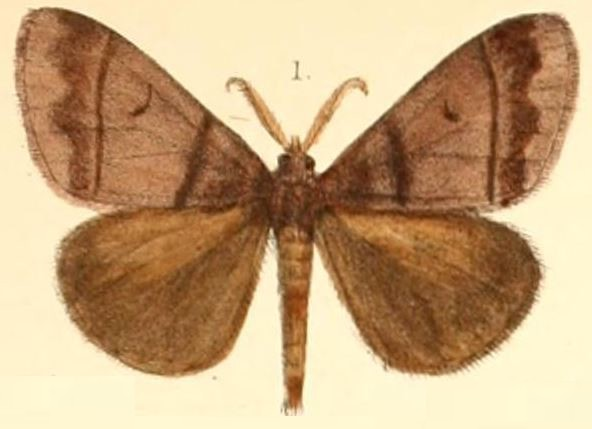

Scientific classification
- Domain: Eukaryota
- Kingdom: Animalia
- Phylum: Arthropoda
- Class: Insecta
- Order: Lepidoptera
- Superfamily: Noctuoidea
- Family: Erebidae
- Genus: Euproctis
- Species: E. cervina

Binomial name
- Euproctis cervina (Moore, 1877)

Synonyms
- Artaxa cervina Moore, 1877; Artaxa pygmaea Moore, 1879; Artaxa pusilla Moore, [1883]; Euproctis dana C. Swinhoe, 1903; Nygmia dana C. Swinhoe, 1923; Nygmia cervina C. Swinhoe, 1922

= Euproctis cervina =

Species of moth

Euproctis cervina is a moth of the family Erebidae first described by Frederic Moore in 1877. It is found in Sri Lanka.
