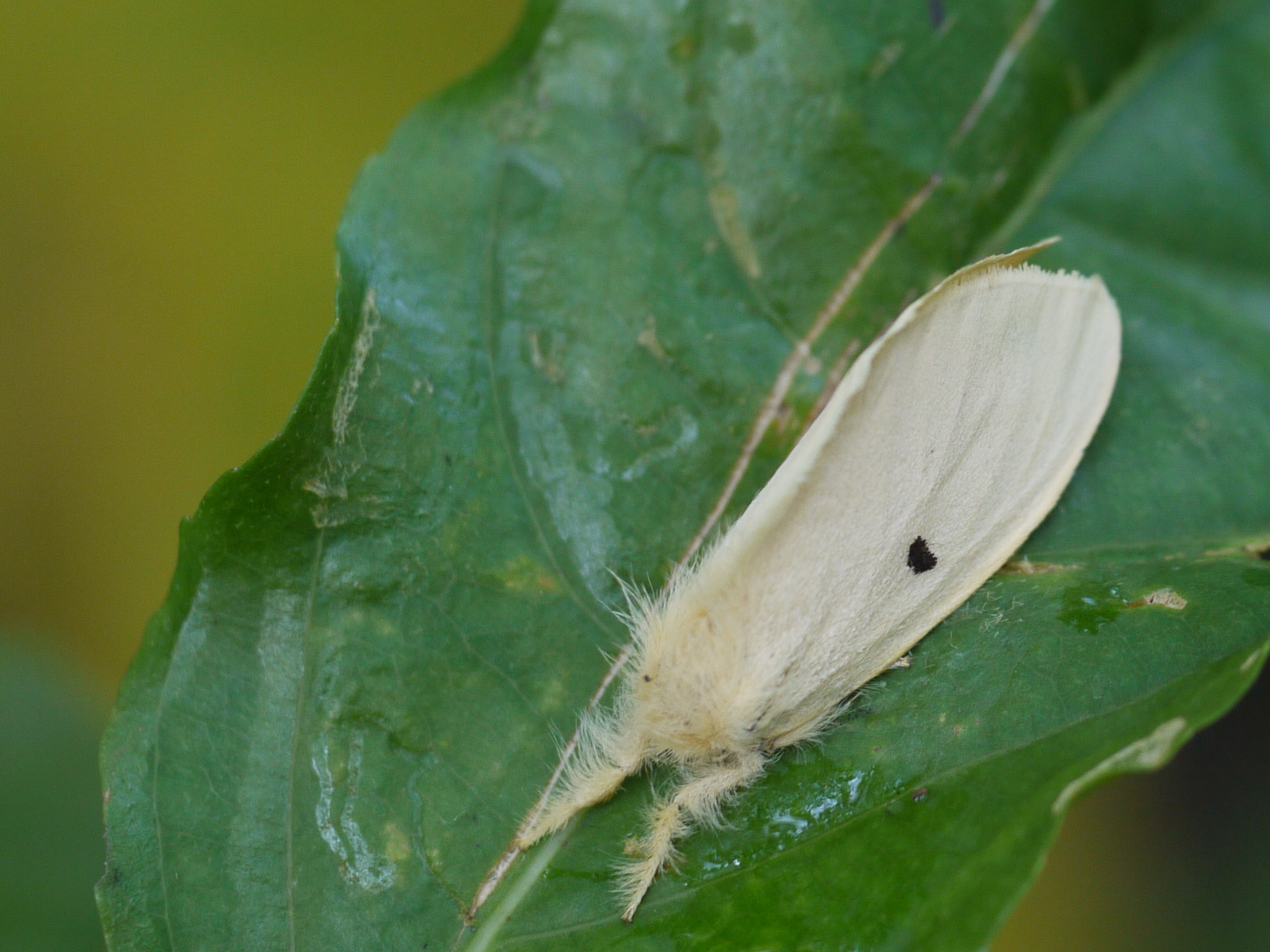

Scientific classification
- Kingdom: Animalia
- Phylum: Arthropoda
- Class: Insecta
- Order: Lepidoptera
- Superfamily: Noctuoidea
- Family: Erebidae
- Genus: Euproctis
- Species: E. lunata

Binomial name
- Euproctis lunata Francis Walker, 1855

Synonyms
- Euproctis bigutta Walker, 1855; Euproctis lutescens Walker, 1855; Euproctis bigutta Collenette, 1932; Nygmia bimaculata Swinhoe, 1923

= Euproctis lunata =

Species of moth

Euproctis lunata, the castor hairy caterpillar, is a moth of the family Erebidae. The species was first described by Francis Walker in 1855. It is found in India, Pakistan, Sri Lanka and Thailand.

The wingspan of the male is 30–32 mm and the female's wingspan is 35–37 mm. Antennae of male bipectinate (comb like on both sides) whereas female has filiform (thread-like) antennae. Male is about 10–12 mm in length and female is 12–14 mm in length. Pupa light reddish brown.

== Bionomics ==
The caterpillar is known to feed on Ricinus communis, Acacia nilotica, Tamarindus indica, Nerium oleander, Chrysanthemum, Moringa oleifera, Ziziphus mauritiana, Cinnamomum camphora, Terminalia tomentosa, Erythrina fusca, Erythrina variegata, Eugenia, Mangifera indica, Manihot esculenta, Morus, Pithecellobium dulce, Sesbania grandiflora, Terminalia tomentosa, Ziziphus jujuba and Ziziphus mauritiana. and recently from Sesbania sesban.

During February and March 2002, a severe outbreak of castor hairy caterpillar was observed on acacia trees in Thailakulam, Virudhunagar, Tamil Nadu, India. Larval swarms persisted for 10 to 15 days in vegetation and were a nuisance to the environment and surrounding villages. A hymenopteran Aholcus euproctiscidis is an egg parasite of the castor hairy caterpillar.
