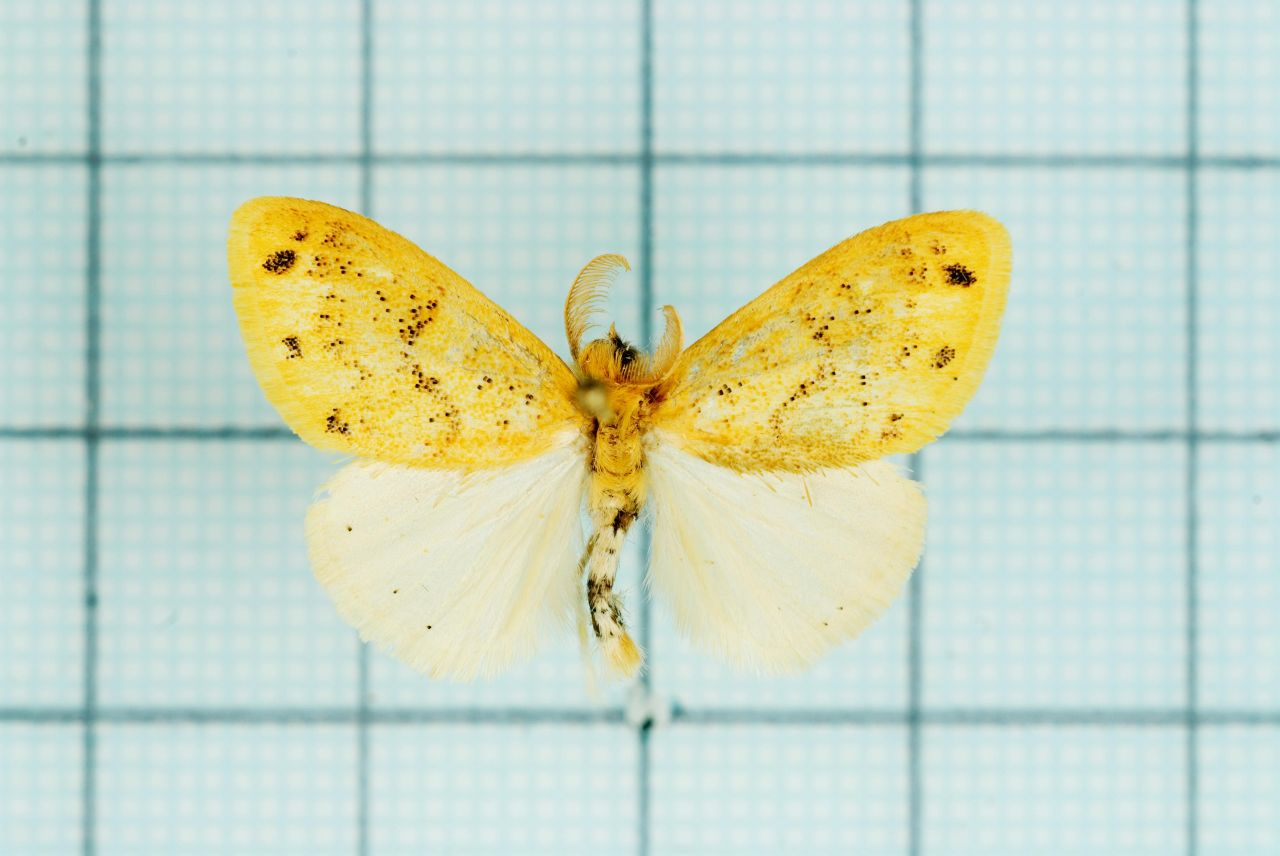

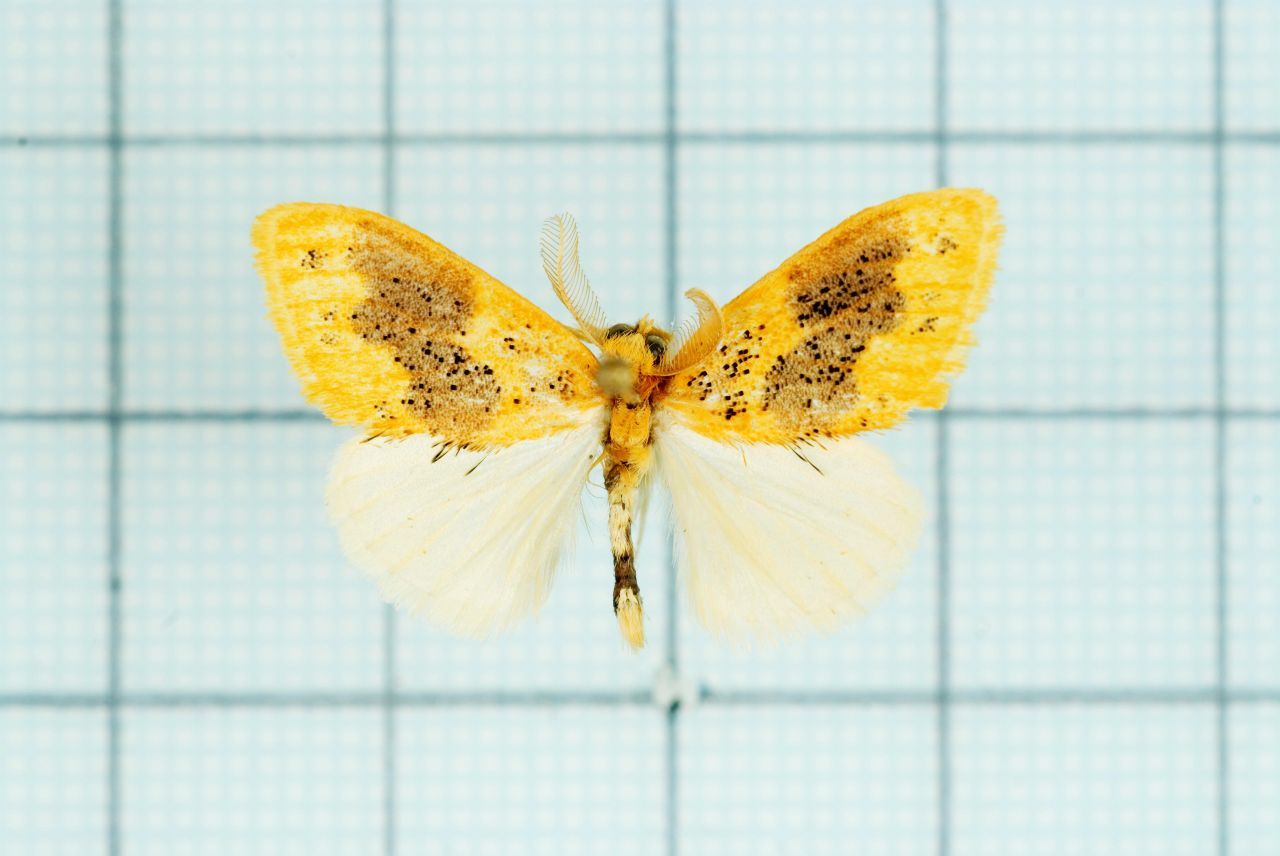

Scientific classification
- Domain: Eukaryota
- Kingdom: Animalia
- Phylum: Arthropoda
- Class: Insecta
- Order: Lepidoptera
- Superfamily: Noctuoidea
- Family: Erebidae
- Genus: Euproctis
- Species: E. purpureofasciata

Binomial name
- Euproctis purpureofasciata Wileman, 1914

= Euproctis purpureofasciata =

Species of moth

Euproctis purpureofasciata is a moth of the family Erebidae. It is found in Taiwan.

The wingspan is 21–26 mm. Adults are on wing from May to October.
