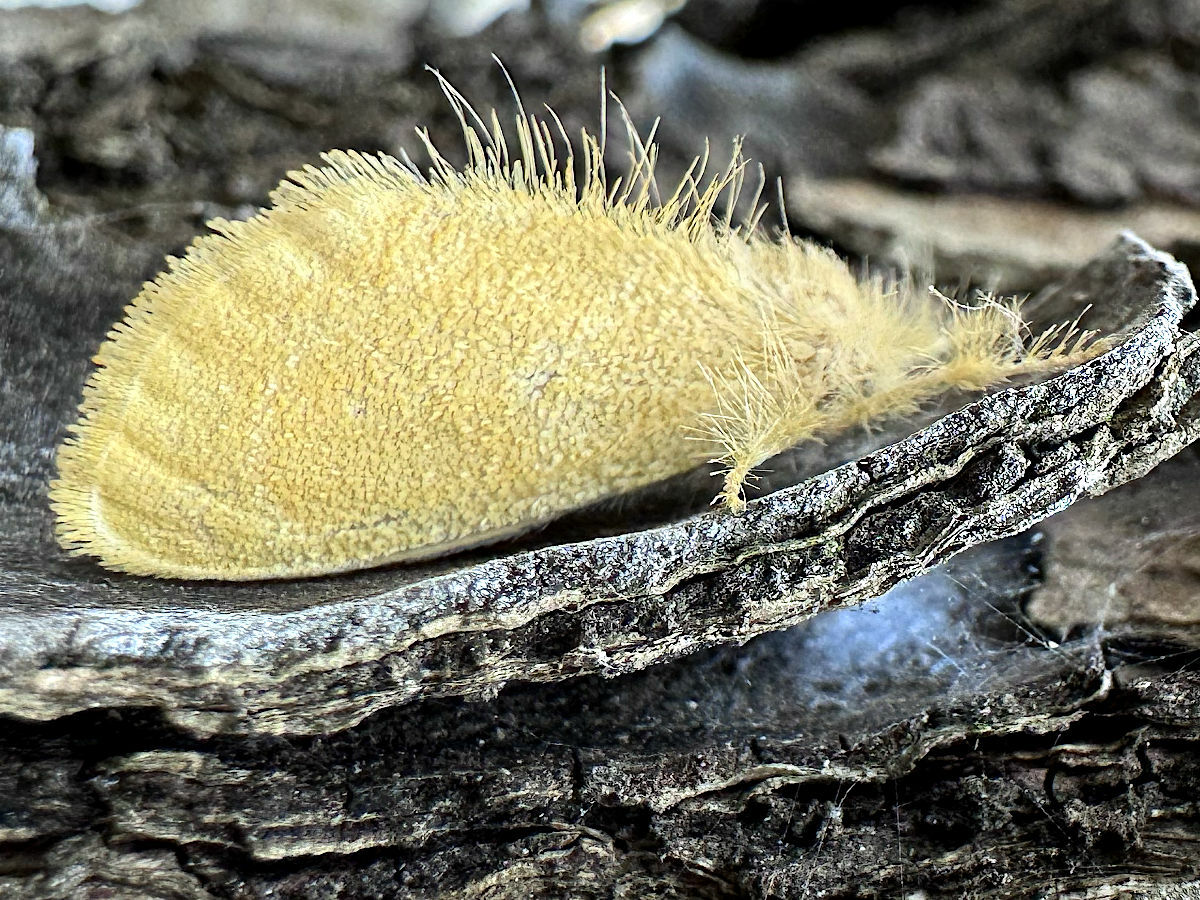
- adult
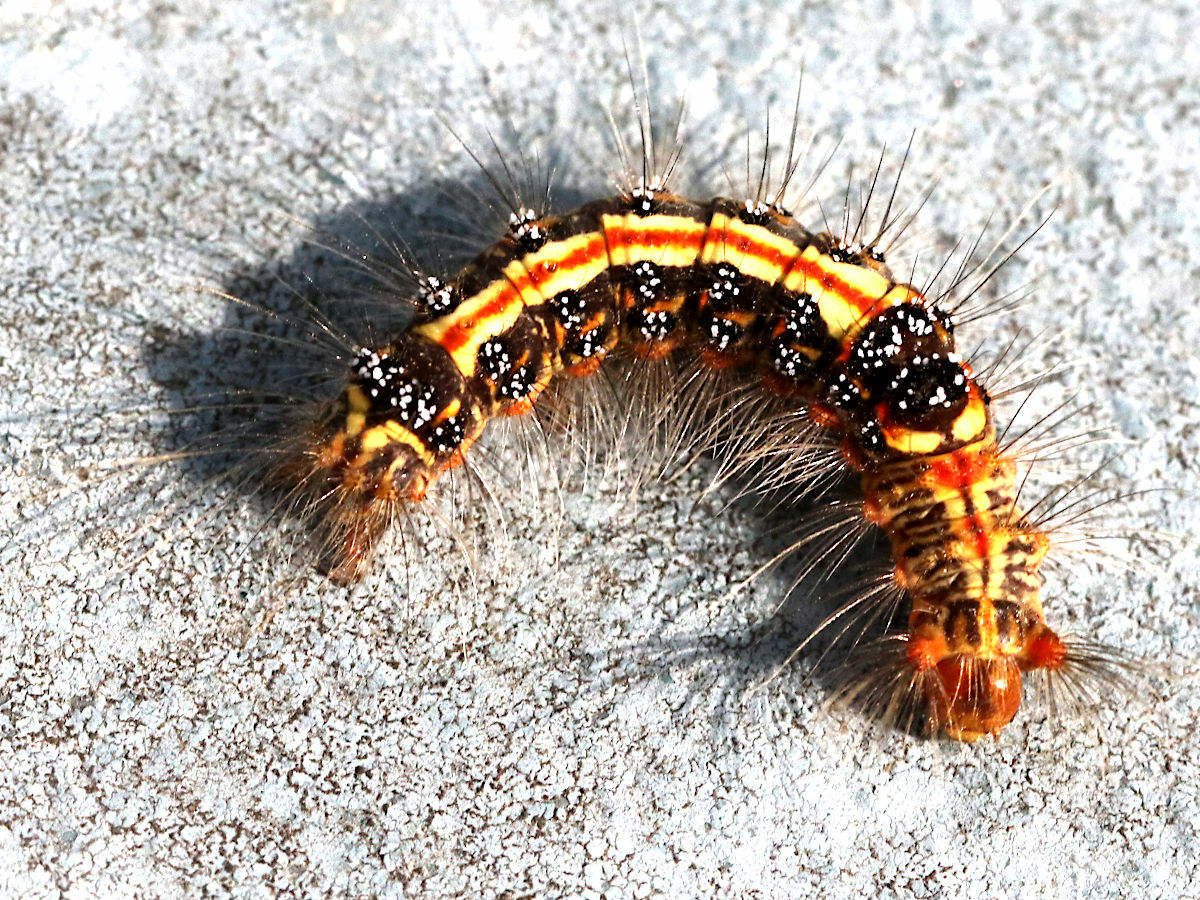
- caterpillar

Scientific classification
- Kingdom: Animalia
- Phylum: Arthropoda
- Clade: Pancrustacea
- Class: Insecta
- Order: Lepidoptera
- Superfamily: Noctuoidea
- Family: Erebidae
- Genus: Euproctis
- Species: E. taiwana

Binomial name
- Euproctis taiwana (Shiraki, 1913)

= Euproctis taiwana =

Species of insect

Euproctis taiwana, the Taiwan yellow tussock moth, is a species of tussock moth in the family Erebidae.

It is distributed in Asia, from northern China to south Asia and southeast Asia.
