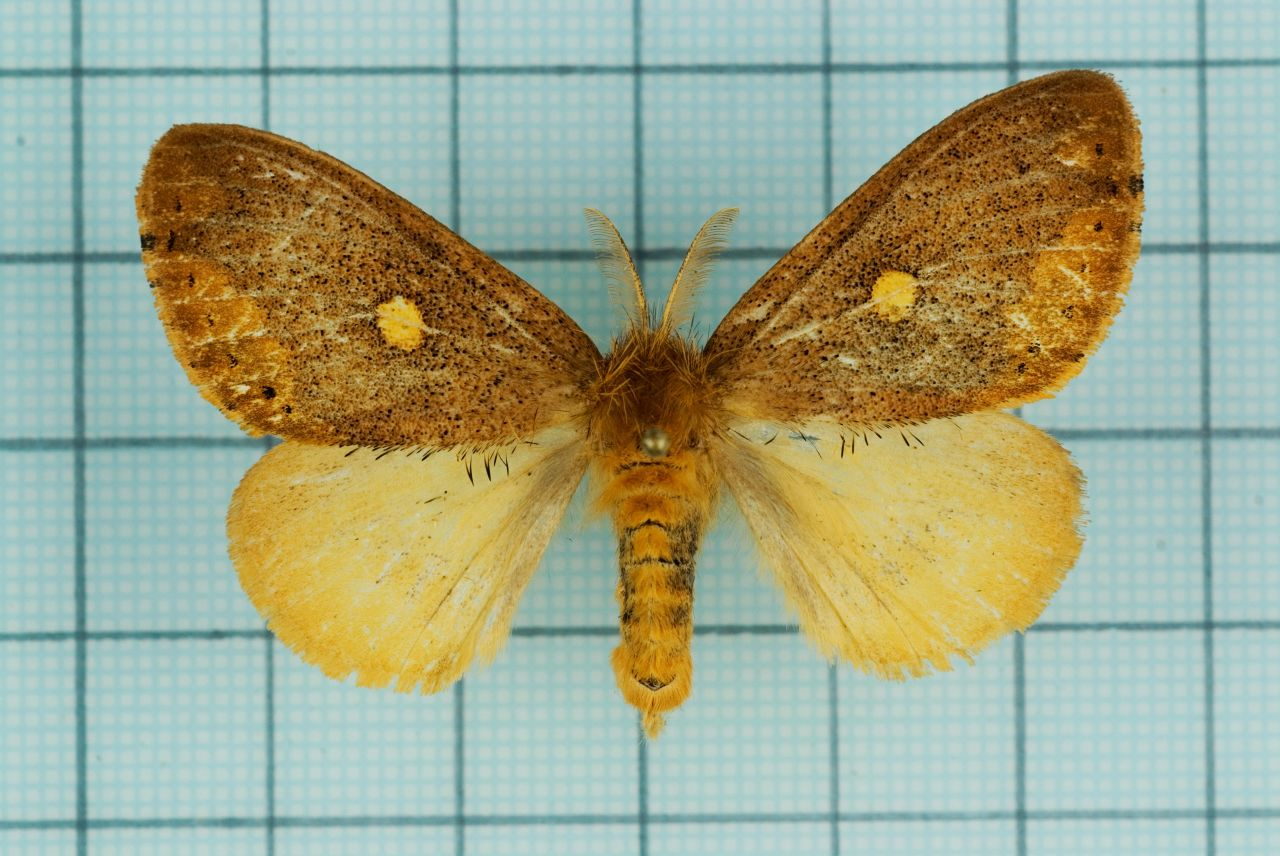

Scientific classification
- Domain: Eukaryota
- Kingdom: Animalia
- Phylum: Arthropoda
- Class: Insecta
- Order: Lepidoptera
- Superfamily: Noctuoidea
- Family: Erebidae
- Genus: Euproctis
- Species: E. insulata

Binomial name
- Euproctis insulata Wileman, 1910

= Euproctis insulata =

Species of moth

Euproctis insulata (Chinese: 黃斑黃毒蛾, Yellow-Spotted Poisonous Moth) is a moth in the family Erebidae first described by Alfred Ernest Wileman in 1910. It is found in Taiwan.

The wingspan is 38–50 mm.
