= Euproctis semisignata =

Scientific classification
- Kingdom: Animalia
- Phylum: Arthropoda
- Class: Insecta
- Order: Lepidoptera
- Superfamily: Noctuoidea
- Family: Erebidae
- Genus: Euproctis
- Species: E. semisignata

Binomial name
- Euproctis semisignata Walker, 1865

Species of moth

Euproctis semisignata is a moth of the family Erebidae first described by Francis Walker in 1865. It is found in India and Sri Lanka.

The caterpillar is a serious pest on coconut inflorescences.
