= Euproctis apoblepta =

Scientific classification
- Domain: Eukaryota
- Kingdom: Animalia
- Phylum: Arthropoda
- Class: Insecta
- Order: Lepidoptera
- Superfamily: Noctuoidea
- Family: Erebidae
- Genus: Euproctis
- Species: E. apoblepta

Binomial name
- Euproctis apoblepta Collenette, 1953

Synonyms
- Euproctis bernardi Griveaud, 1973

Species of moth

Euproctis apoblepta is a moth of the family Erebidae. It is found in Madagascar.

The male of this species has a wingspan of 35 mm. Head and front are bright orange-yellow, antennae with yellow flagellum and brownish black pectinations, thorax, abdomen and legs are orange-yellow. The legs are strongly hairy.

Forewings orange-yellow with a large grey discal part.
