= Euproctis fulvipuncta =

Scientific classification
- Kingdom: Animalia
- Phylum: Arthropoda
- Class: Insecta
- Order: Lepidoptera
- Superfamily: Noctuoidea
- Family: Erebidae
- Genus: Euproctis
- Species: E. fulvipuncta

Binomial name
- Euproctis fulvipuncta Hampson, 1893

Synonyms
- Nygmia fulvipuncta Swinhoe, 1923

Species of moth

Euproctis fulvipuncta is a moth of the family Erebidae first described by George Hampson in 1893. It is found in India and Sri Lanka.

It was described by Hampson as white with orange spots, with brown antennas.

The caterpillar is known to feed on Neolitsea zeylanica.
