= Thia (disambiguation) =

Thia is a genus of crabs

Thia may also refer to:

- Tegeticula, a prodoxid moth genus invalidly described as Thia by H. Edwards in 1888
- 405 Thia, an asteroid
- Thia Megia (born 1995), a contestant in the 10th season of American Idol
- Henry Thia (born 1952), Singaporean actor and comedian
- Shawn Thia (born 1995), Singaporean actor
- Thia, a character in Predator: Badlands

== See also ==
- Thea (disambiguation)
- Theia (disambiguation)
