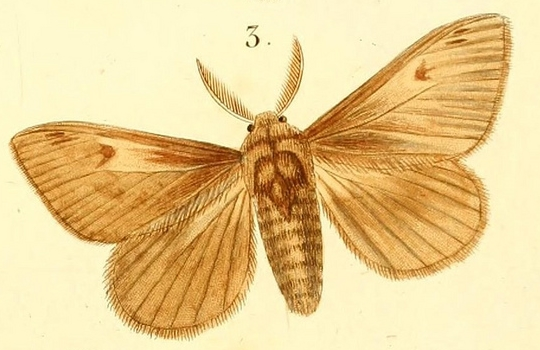

Scientific classification
- Domain: Eukaryota
- Kingdom: Animalia
- Phylum: Arthropoda
- Class: Insecta
- Order: Lepidoptera
- Superfamily: Noctuoidea
- Family: Erebidae
- Genus: Euproctis
- Species: E. annulipes

Binomial name
- Euproctis annulipes (Boisduval, 1833)

Synonyms
- Bombyx annulipes Boisduval, 1833; Nygmia annulipes Swinhoe, 1923

= Euproctis annulipes =

Species of moth

Euproctis annulipes is a moth of the family Erebidae. It is found in La Réunion.
