= Euproctis bimaculata =

Scientific classification
- Kingdom: Animalia
- Phylum: Arthropoda
- Class: Insecta
- Order: Lepidoptera
- Superfamily: Noctuoidea
- Family: Erebidae
- Genus: Euproctis
- Species: E. bimaculata

Binomial name
- Euproctis bimaculata Walker, 1855

Synonyms
- Euproctis bigutta Walker, 1855; Euproctis lutescens Walker, 1855; Euproctis bigutta Collenette, 1932; Nygmia bimaculata Swinhoe, 1923

Species of moth

Euproctis bimaculata is a moth of the family Erebidae first described by Francis Walker in 1855. It is found in India, Sri Lanka and Thailand.

The caterpillar is known to feed on Loranthus species.
