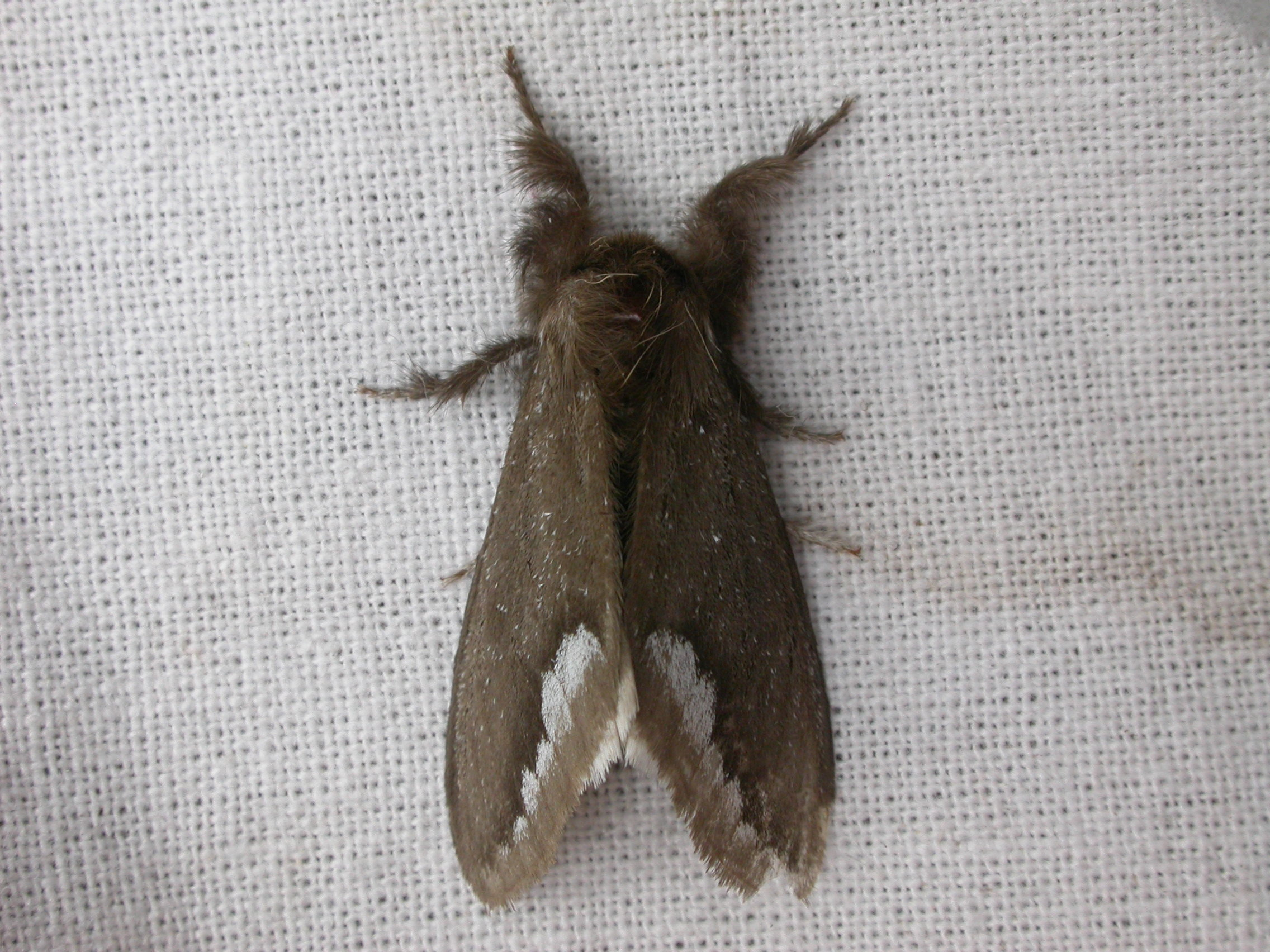

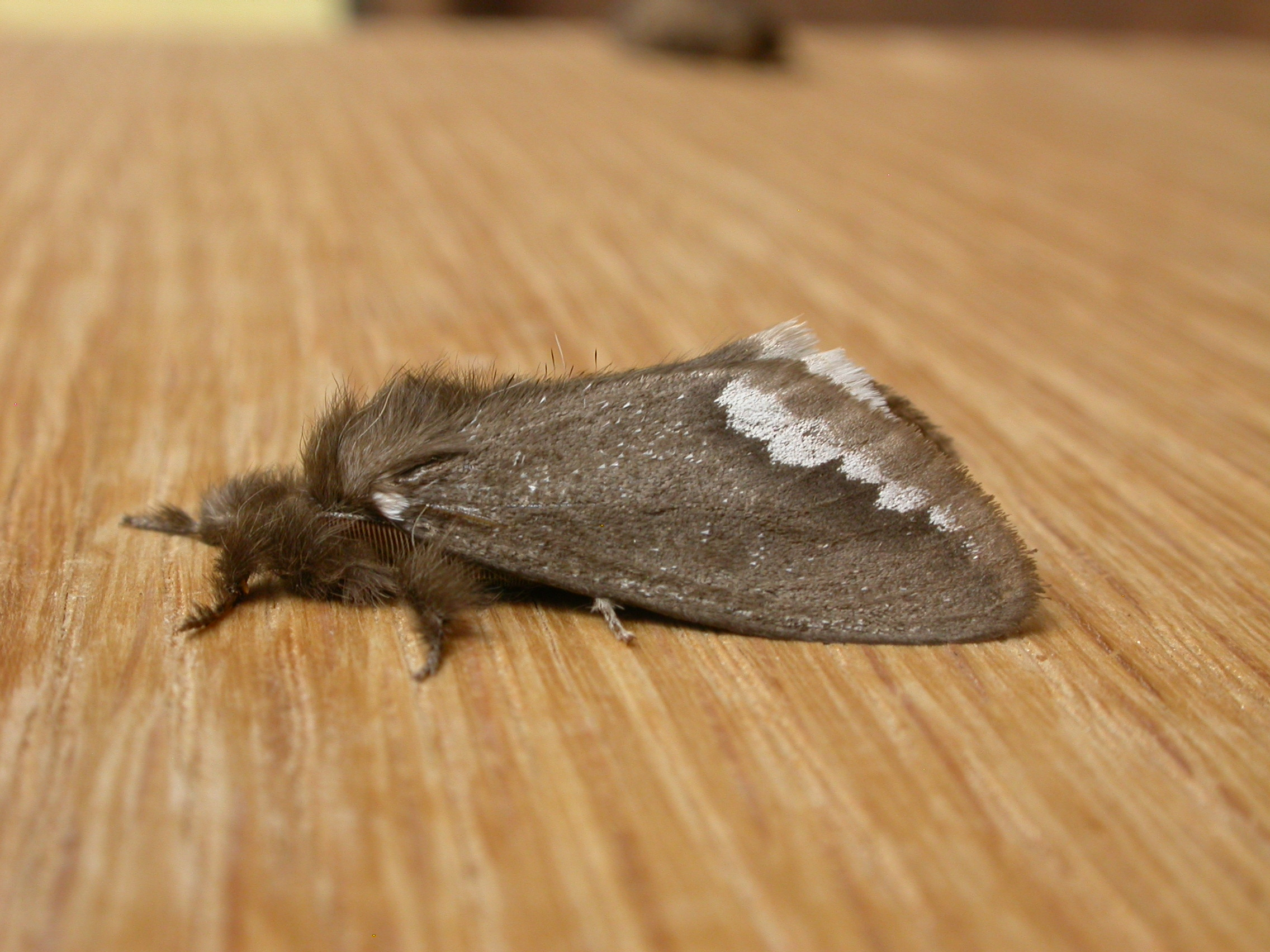

Scientific classification
- Kingdom: Animalia
- Phylum: Arthropoda
- Clade: Pancrustacea
- Class: Insecta
- Order: Lepidoptera
- Superfamily: Noctuoidea
- Family: Erebidae
- Genus: Euproctis
- Species: E. limbalis

Binomial name
- Euproctis limbalis (Herrich-Schäffer, 1855)

Synonyms
- Porthesia limbalis Herrich-Schäffer, 1855; Urocoma limbalis; Urocoma boeckeae Herrich-Schäffer, 1858; Ela leucophaea Walker, 1862

= Euproctis limbalis =

Species of moth

Euproctis limbalis, the bordered browntail moth, is a moth of the subfamily Lymantriinae first described by Gottlieb August Wilhelm Herrich-Schäffer in 1855. It is known from Australia, including Queensland and New South Wales.

Hairs on the caterpillar and cocoon can cause mild to severe skin irritations.

The caterpillars have been recorded as pests feeding on leaves and earheads of sorghum and other millets.
