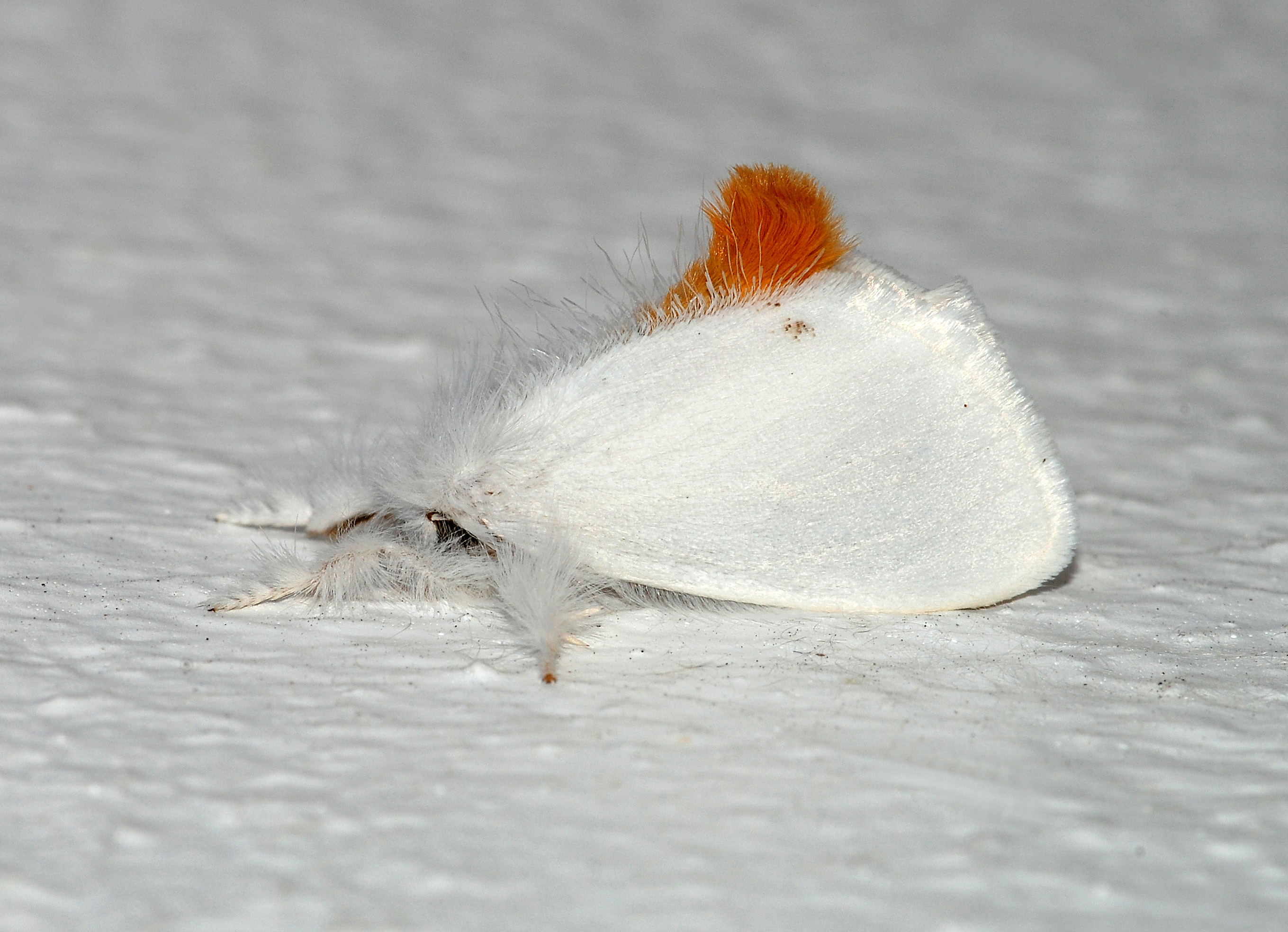
- Euproctis chrysorrhoea

Scientific classification
- Kingdom: Animalia
- Phylum: Arthropoda
- Clade: Pancrustacea
- Class: Insecta
- Order: Lepidoptera
- Superfamily: Noctuoidea
- Family: Erebidae
- Tribe: Nygmiini
- Genus: Euproctis; Hübner, [1819]

Synonyms
- Leucoma Hübner, [1806]; Porthesia Stephens, 1828; Dulichia Walker, 1855; Lopera Walker, 1855; Urocoma Herrich-Schäffer, [1858]; Ela Walker, 1862; Cataphractes Felder, 1874; Tearosoma Felder, 1874; Pygetera Kirby, 1892; Euproctilla Aurivillius, 1904; Euproctillina Hering, 1926; Euproctillopsis Hering, 1926; Meteuproctis Matsumura, 1927; Knappetra Nye, 1980; Viettema Griveaud, 1977

= Euproctis =

Genus of moths

Euproctis is a genus of tussock moths in the family Erebidae described by Jacob Hübner in 1819. Species are cosmopolitan, widespread throughout Palearctic, African, Oriental and Australian regions. Molecular phylogenetic studies indicate that the genus as presently understood comprises a large number of unrelated lineages (i.e., is paraphyletic), only a few of which have names (e.g., the genera Kidokuga and Sphrageidus), and is therefore in serious need of revision.

== Description ==
Palpi obliquely porrect (projecting forward), reaching beyond the frons. Antennae bipectinated (comb like on both sides) in both sexes, where branches are long in males each with a spine to keep it in position with regard to the contiguous branch. Mid tibia with one pair of long spurs and hind tibia with two pairs. Female has a large anal tuft. Forewings with veins 3, 4 and 5 from near angle of cell. Vein 6 from or from below upper angle. Veins 7 to 10 are stalked, where vein 10 being given off towards apex. Hindwings with vein 3 and 4 stalked or from angle of cell. Vein 5 from above angle, and veins 6 and 7 stalked.

== Species ==
- Euproctis acatharta Turner, 1906
- Euproctis acrita Joicey & Talbot, 1917
- Euproctis actor Turner, 1920
- Euproctis aganopa Turner, 1921
- Euproctis albocillata Bethune-Baker, 1904
- Euproctis albolyclene Holloway, 1999
- Euproctis amagethes Collenette, 1930
- Euproctis anisozyga Collenette, 1955
- Euproctis annulipes (Boisduval, 1833)
- Euproctis anomoeoptena Collenette, 1932
- Euproctis anthorrhoea Kollar, 1848
- Euproctis apatetica Collenette, 1930
- Euproctis apoblepta Collenette, 1953
- Euproctis aresca Collenette, 1955
- Euproctis arfaki Bethune-Baker, 1910
- Euproctis asaphobalia Collenette, 1932
- Euproctis aspersum Felder, 1874
- Euproctis aurantiicolor Rothschild, 1915
- Euproctis bakeri Collenette, 1932
- Euproctis baliolalis Swinhoe, 1892
- Euproctis basalis (Moore, 1879)
- Euproctis bicolor Walker, 1855
- Euproctis bimaculata Walker, 1855
- Euproctis bisecta Rothschild, 1915
- Euproctis brunneipicta Collenette, 1930
- Euproctis celebesica Strand, 1915
- Euproctis cervina (Moore, 1877)
- Euproctis chlora Joicey & Talbot, 1917
- Euproctis chlorogaster Collenette, 1938
- Euproctis chlorospila Joicey & Talbot, 1917
- Euproctis chrysophaea Walker, 1865
- Euproctis chrysorrhoea Linnaeus, 1758
- Euproctis citrinula van Eecke, 1928
- Euproctis conspersa (Felder, 1874)
- Euproctis crocea Walker, 1865
- Euproctis daures (Mey, 2007)
- Euproctis dichroa Felder, 1861
- Euproctis diselena Collenette, 1932
- Euproctis dispersa (Moore, 1879)
- Euproctis disphena Collenette, 1930
- Euproctis edwardsii Newman, 1856
- Euproctis emilei Griveaud, 1973
- Euproctis emprepes Turner, 1931
- Euproctis epaxia Turner, 1906
- Euproctis epidela Turner, 1906
- Euproctis eurybia Collenette, 1959
- Euproctis euthysana Turner, 1902
- Euproctis faceta Swinhoe, 1903
- Euproctis fasciata Walker, 1855
- Euproctis fimbriata Lucas, 1891
- Euproctis flavicaput Bethune-Baker, 1904
- Euproctis flavinata Walker, 1865
- Euproctis flavipunctata Bethune-Baker, 1916
- Euproctis fleuriotii (Guérin-Méneville, 1862)
- Euproctis fraterna Moore, 1883
- Euproctis fulvipuncta Hampson, 1893
- Euproctis fusca Rothschild, 1915
- Euproctis fusipennis Walker, 1862
- Euproctis galactopis Turner, 1902
- Euproctis gilvivirgata Collenette, 1932
- Euproctis habbema Collenette, 1955
- Euproctis hemicneca Collenette, 1955
- Euproctis hemigenes Collenette, 1932
- Euproctis holdingii Felder, 1874
- Euproctis holoxutha Turner, 1902
- Euproctis huntei Warren, 1903
- Euproctis hylaena Collenette, 1955
- Euproctis hymnolis Turner, 1921
- Euproctis hypocloa Collenette, 1932
- Euproctis idonea Swinhoe, 1903
- Euproctis insulata Wileman, 1910
- Euproctis iseres Collenette, 1955
- Euproctis juliettae Griveaud, 1973
- Euproctis kamburonga Holloway, 1976
- Euproctis kanshireia Wileman, 1910
- Euproctis kunupi Collenette, 1938
- Euproctis latifascia Walker, 1855
- Euproctis lativitta (Moore, 1879)
- Euproctis leonina Turner, 1903
- Euproctis limbalis (Herrich-Schäffer, 1855)
- Euproctis limonea (Butler, 1882)
- Euproctis lipara Collenette, 1930
- Euproctis longipalpa Collenette, 1938
- Euproctis lucifuga Lucas, 1892
- Euproctis lunata Walker, 1855
- Euproctis lutea (Fabricius, 1775)
- Euproctis lyclene Swinhoe, 1904
- Euproctis mahafalensis Griveaud, 1973
- Euproctis mambara Bethune-Baker, 1908
- Euproctis marginalis Walker, 1855
- Euproctis marojejya Griveaud, 1973
- Euproctis mayottensis Collenette, 1956
- Euproctis meeki Bethune-Baker, 1904
- Euproctis melania (Staudinger, [1892])
- Euproctis melanorrhanta Turner, 1931
- Euproctis melanosoma Butler, 1882
- Euproctis mycoides Collenette, 1930
- Euproctis nebulosa Rothschild, 1915
- Euproctis nigribasalis Swinhoe, 1903
- Euproctis niphobola Turner, 1902
- Euproctis novaguinensis Bethune-Baker, 1904
- Euproctis ochrea (Butler, 1878)
- Euproctis ochrocerca Collenette, 1932
- Euproctis ochroneura Turner, 1931
- Euproctis ochropleura Collenette, 1932
- Euproctis osuna Swinhoe, 1903
- Euproctis parallelaria Bethune-Baker, 1904
- Euproctis poliocerca Collenette, 1930
- Euproctis postbicolor Rothschild, 1915
- Euproctis pratti Bethune-Baker, 1904
- Euproctis pseudoarna Holloway, 1999
- Euproctis pulchra Bethune-Baker, 1908
- Euproctis pulverea (Leech, 1888)
- Euproctis purpureofasciata Wileman, 1914
- Euproctis pyraustis Meyrick, 1891
- Euproctis rhoda (Moore, 1879)
- Euproctis rotunda Bethune-Baker, 1908
- Euproctis sanguigutta Hampson, 1905
- Euproctis sarawacensis Talbot, 1926
- Euproctis schintlmagistri Holloway, 1999
- Euproctis scintillans Walker, 1856
- Euproctis seminigra Joicey & Talbot, 1916
- Euproctis semirufa Joicey & Talbot, 1917
- Euproctis semisignata Walker, 1865
- Euproctis similis Füssli, 1775
- Euproctis squamosa Walker, 1855
- Euproctis stenobia Collenette, 1959
- Euproctis stenomorpha Turner, 1921
- Euproctis straminicolor Janse, 1915
- Euproctis subnobilis Snellen, 1881
- Euproctis taiwana (Shiraki, 1913)
- Euproctis tetrabalia Collenette, 1930
- Euproctis thiocosma Collenette, 1955
- Euproctis titania Butler, 1879
- Euproctis trispila Turner, 1921
- Euproctis u-grisea Holloway, 1976
- Euproctis urbis Strand, 1925
- Euproctis varians (Walker, 1855)
- Euproctis venosa (Moore, 1879)
- Euproctis virginea Bethune-Baker, 1904
- Euproctis virgo Swinhoe, 1903
- Euproctis viridoculata Holloway, 1976
- Euproctis wilemani Collenette, 1929
- Euproctis xuthoaria Collenette, 1955
- Euproctis xuthoptera Turner, 1921
- Euproctis xuthosterna Turner, 1924
- Euproctis yulei Bethune-Baker, 1904
- Euproctis zorodes Collenette, 1955
