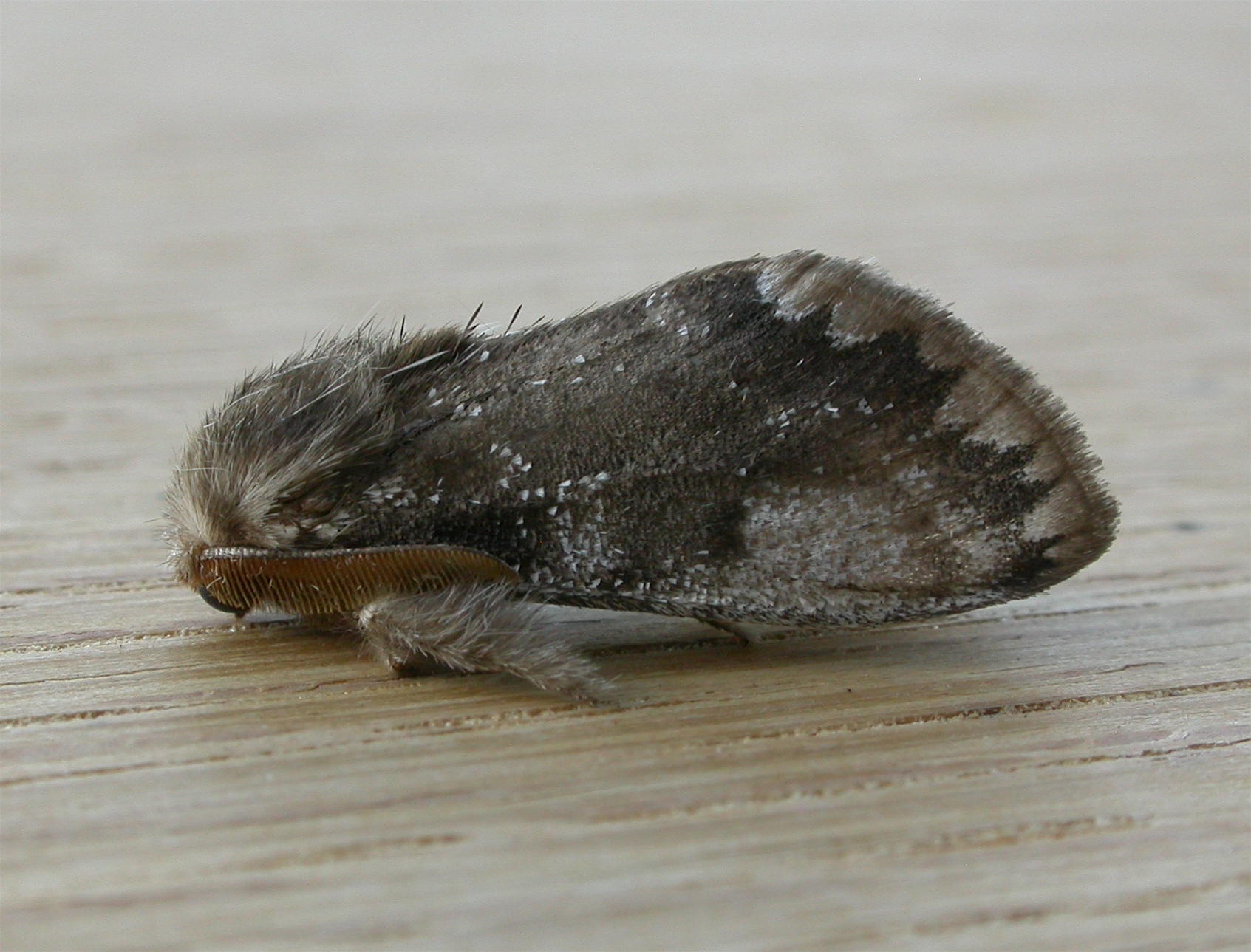

Scientific classification
- Kingdom: Animalia
- Phylum: Arthropoda
- Class: Insecta
- Order: Lepidoptera
- Superfamily: Noctuoidea
- Family: Erebidae
- Genus: Euproctis
- Species: E. marginalis

Binomial name
- Euproctis marginalis Walker, 1855

Synonyms
- Urocoma marginalis

= Euproctis marginalis =

Species of moth

Euproctis marginalis, the margined browntail moth, is a moth of the family Erebidae. The species was first described by Francis Walker in 1855. It is found in Australia, including Tasmania.
