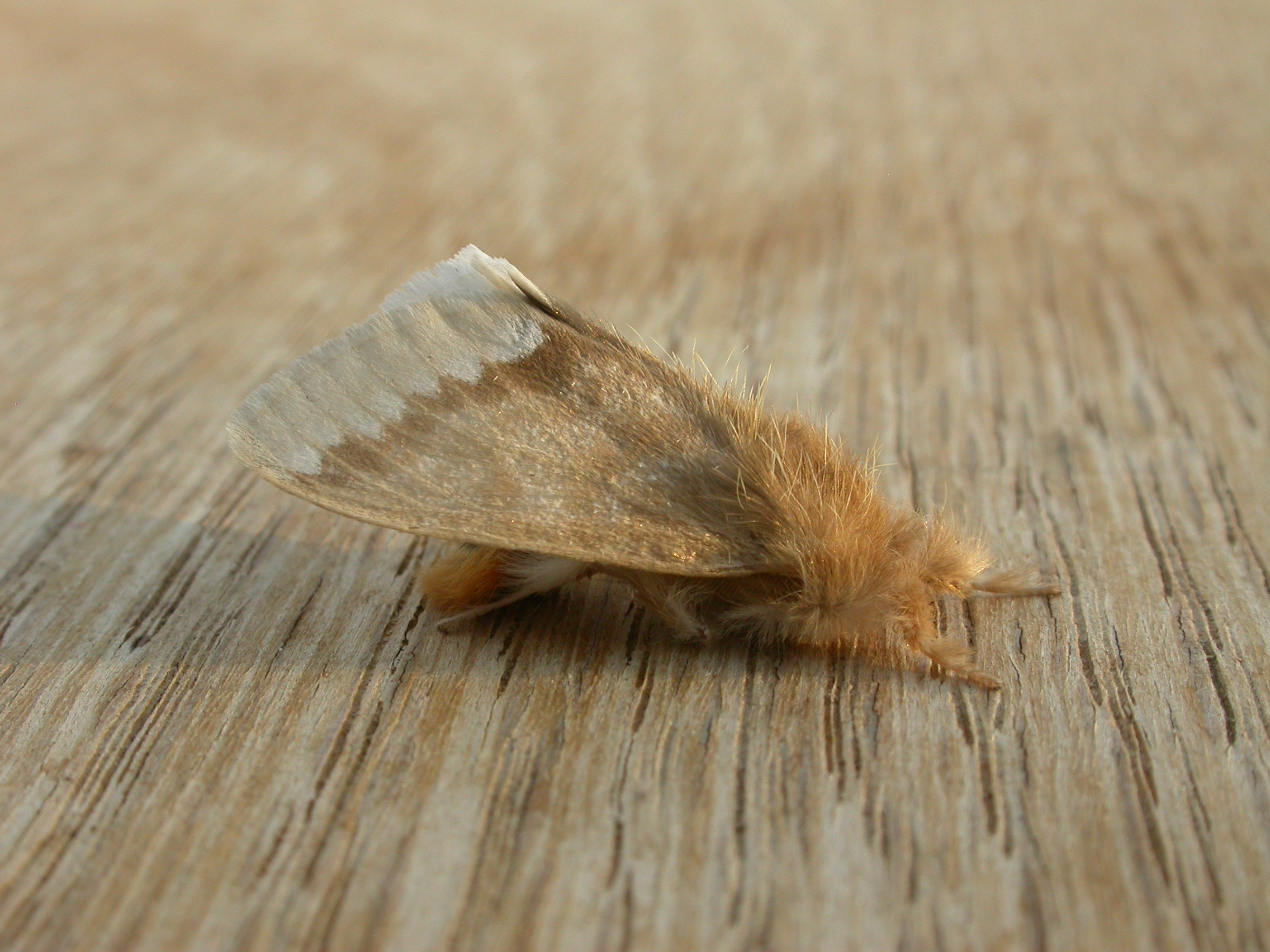

Scientific classification
- Domain: Eukaryota
- Kingdom: Animalia
- Phylum: Arthropoda
- Class: Insecta
- Order: Lepidoptera
- Superfamily: Noctuoidea
- Family: Erebidae
- Genus: Euproctis
- Species: E. baliolalis

Binomial name
- Euproctis baliolalis C. Swinhoe, 1892

Synonyms
- Urocoma baliolalis C. Swinhoe, 1892

= Euproctis baliolalis =

Species of moth

Euproctis baliolalis, the browntail gum moth, is a moth of the family Erebidae. The species was first described by Charles Swinhoe in 1892. It is found in the south-east quarter of Australia.

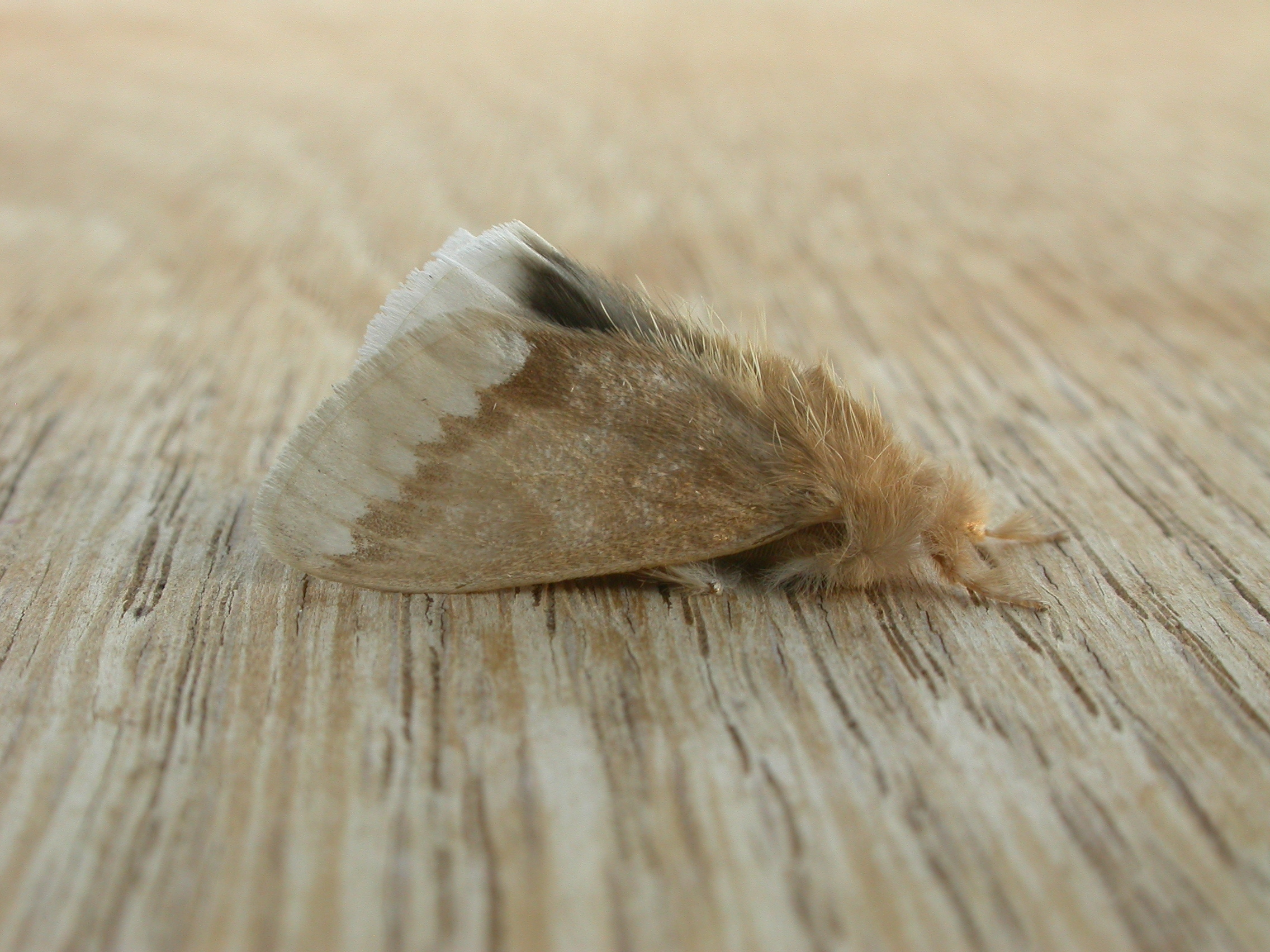

The wingspan is about 50 mm.
