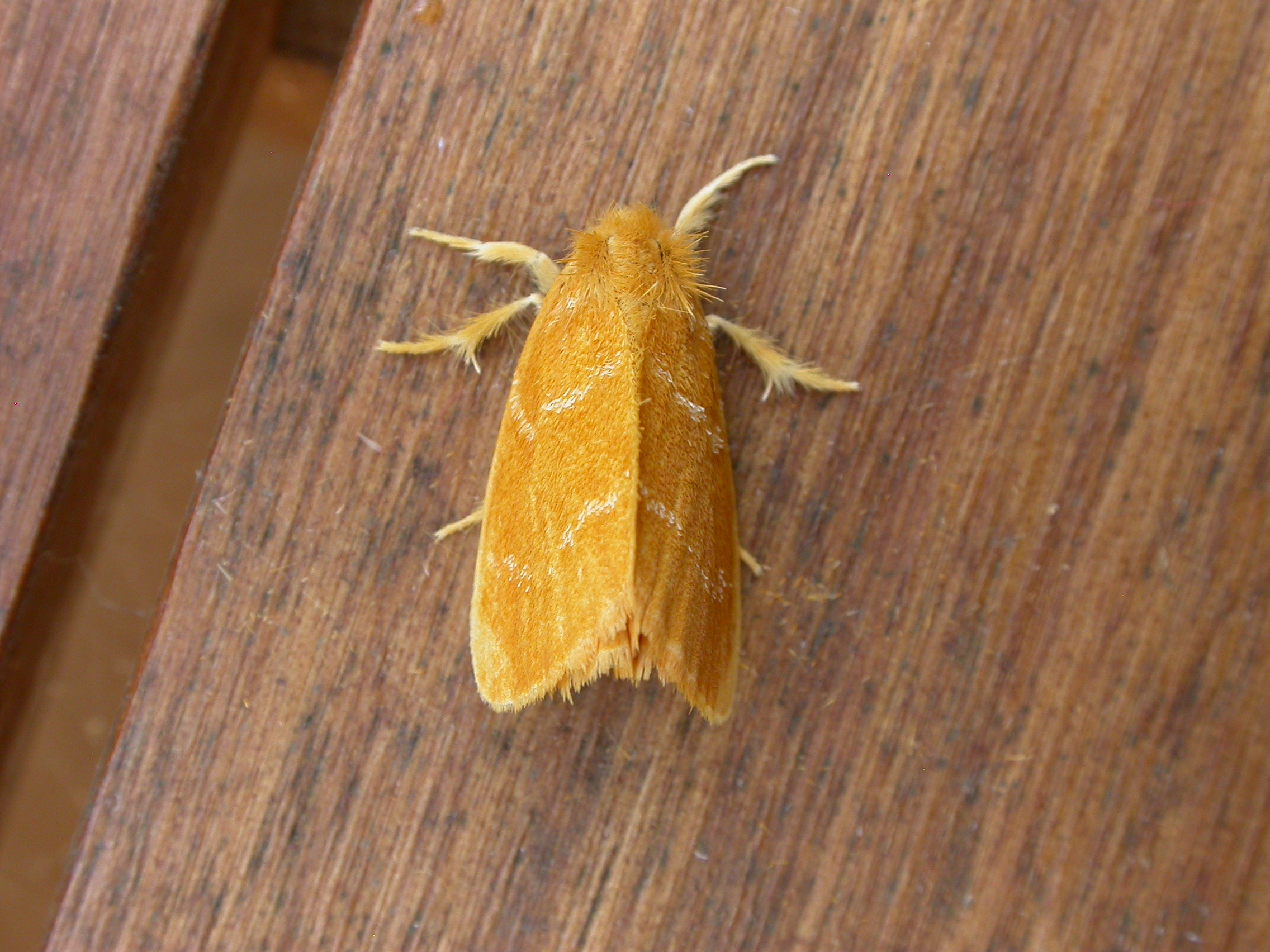

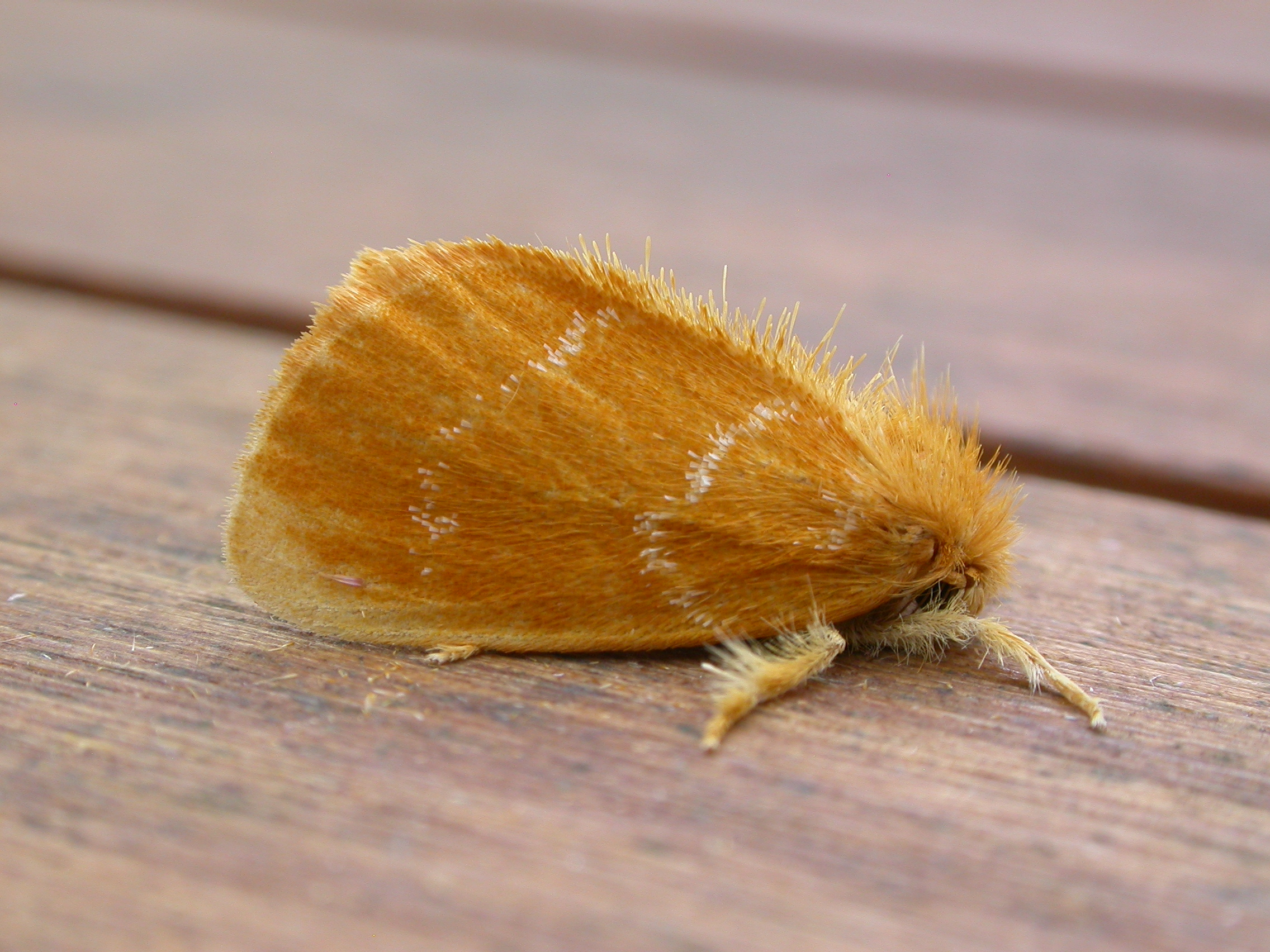

Scientific classification
- Domain: Eukaryota
- Kingdom: Animalia
- Phylum: Arthropoda
- Class: Insecta
- Order: Lepidoptera
- Superfamily: Noctuoidea
- Family: Erebidae
- Genus: Euproctis
- Species: E. lutea

Binomial name
- Euproctis lutea (Fabricius, 1775)

Synonyms
- Bombyx lutea Fabricius, 1775; Artaxa chrysophila Walker, 1865; Porthesia iobrota Meyrick, 1891

= Euproctis lutea =

Species of moth

Euproctis lutea, the fresh-water mangrove itchy caterpillar, is a species of moth of the family Erebidae. It is found in northern Australia (the Northern Territory, Queensland and New South Wales) and New Guinea.

The wingspan of the adult moth is about 30 mm.

The larvae feed on Lycopersicon esculentum, Begonia species, Myosotis arvensis, Rosa odorata, Barringtonia acutangula and Planchonia careya. Full-grown larvae reach a length of about 15 mm, and their hairs can lead to intense itching after contact with human skin.

The moth was first described in European scientific literature by Johan Christian Fabricius in 1775.
