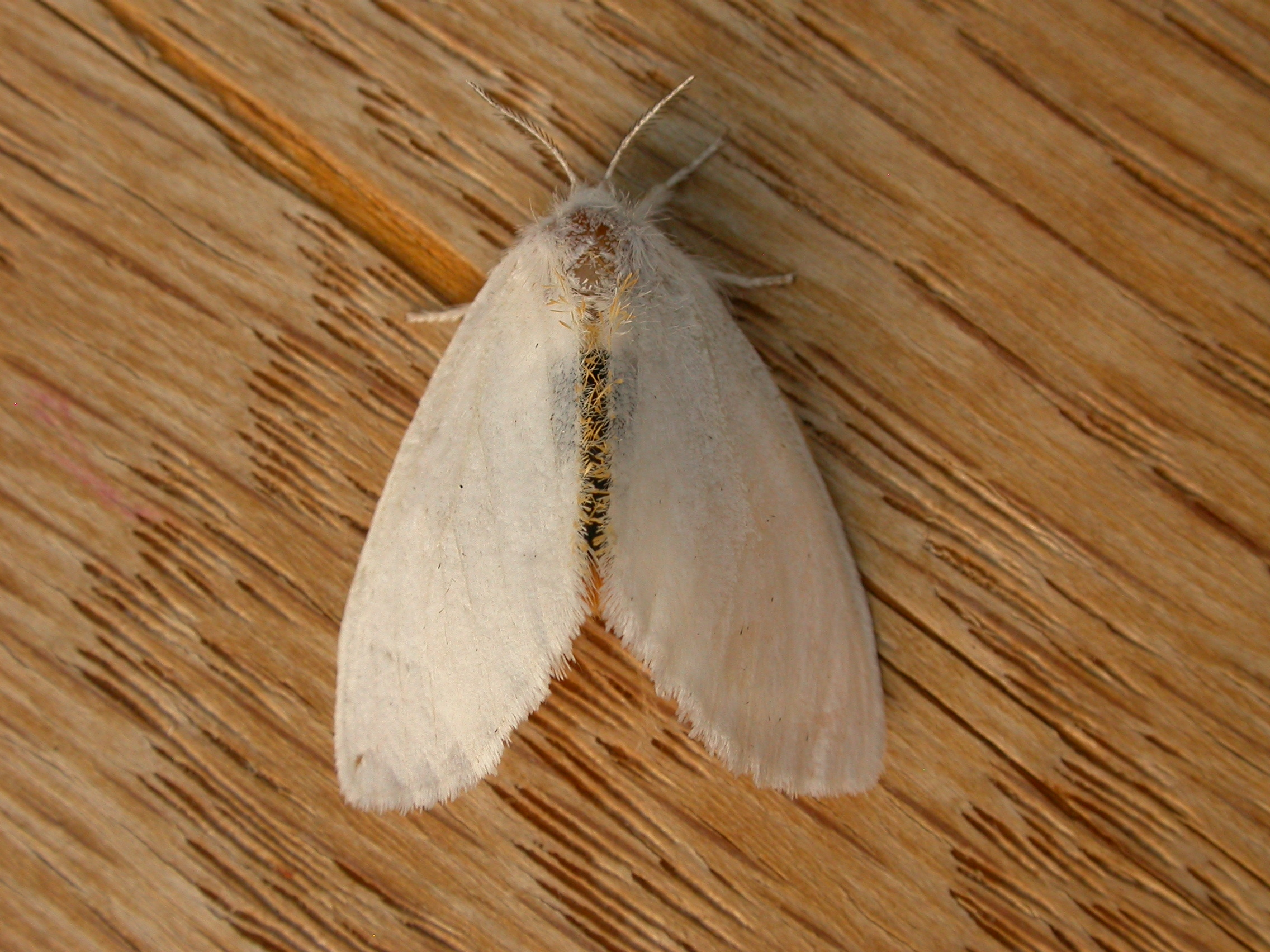

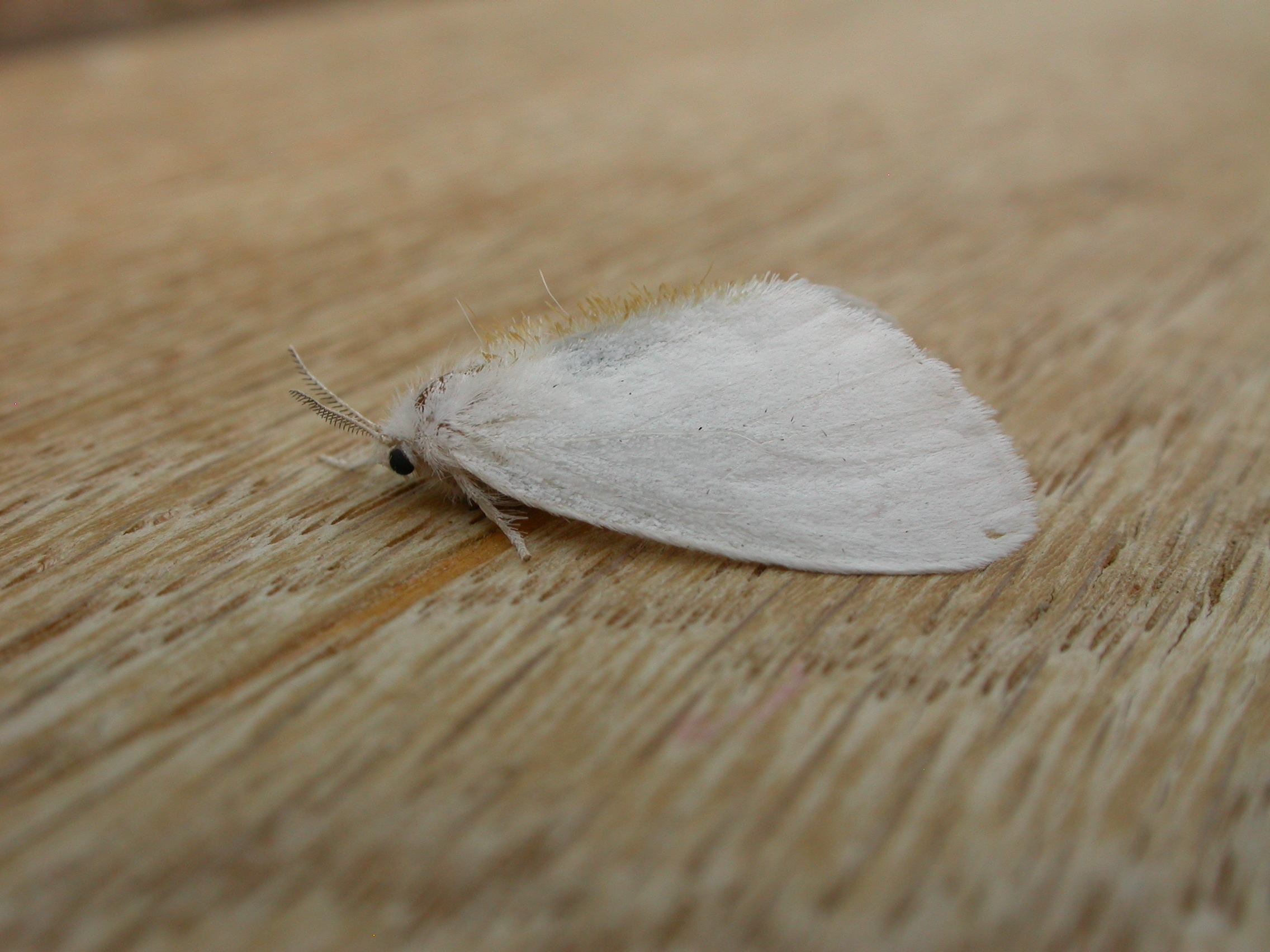

Scientific classification
- Domain: Eukaryota
- Kingdom: Animalia
- Phylum: Arthropoda
- Class: Insecta
- Order: Lepidoptera
- Superfamily: Noctuoidea
- Family: Erebidae
- Genus: Euproctis
- Species: E. melanosoma

Binomial name
- Euproctis melanosoma (Butler, 1882)

Synonyms
- Porthesia melanosoma Butler, 1882; Porthesia mixta Butler, 1882; Porthesia melainfera Strand, 1923; Porthesia melaninfera Strand, 1923

= Euproctis melanosoma =

Species of moth

Euproctis melanosoma is a species of moth of the family Erebidae. It is known from New South Wales, Queensland, Tasmania and Victoria.

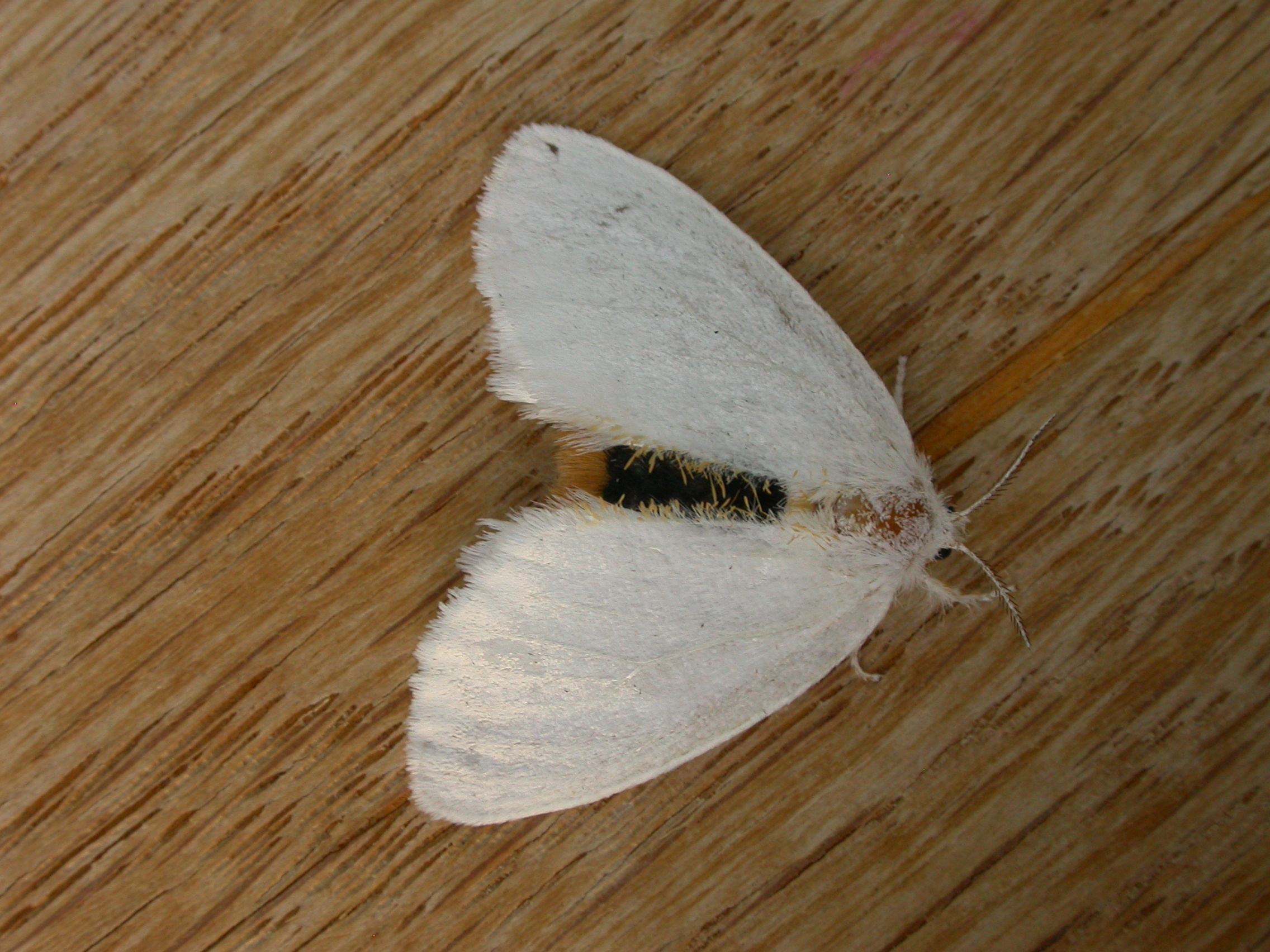

The wingspan is about 30 mm.
