= Theow =

Mythological beast in heraldry

Theow, also called thos, thea or thoye, is a hybrid heraldic beast, represented by a wolf with goat's hooves.

It goes back to a mythological beast described in antiquity by Pliny the Elder, as looking like a wolf but with bigger body and shorter legs. This has been interpreted as an attempt at describing a jackal. In Medieval bestiaries it was described as being a kind of wolf with a mane of different colours. During the winter it had thick hair but it lost all its fur in summer. It never attacked humans and was said to live in Ethiopia, home of many semi-legendary animals according to Medieval bestiaries. This creature, according to another description made by Solinus in the Collectanea rerum memorabilium (Third century AD), is very likely to be a misrepresentation of an actual canid only found within the country’s borders, the Ethiopian wolf, which the local people call ‘theas’.
