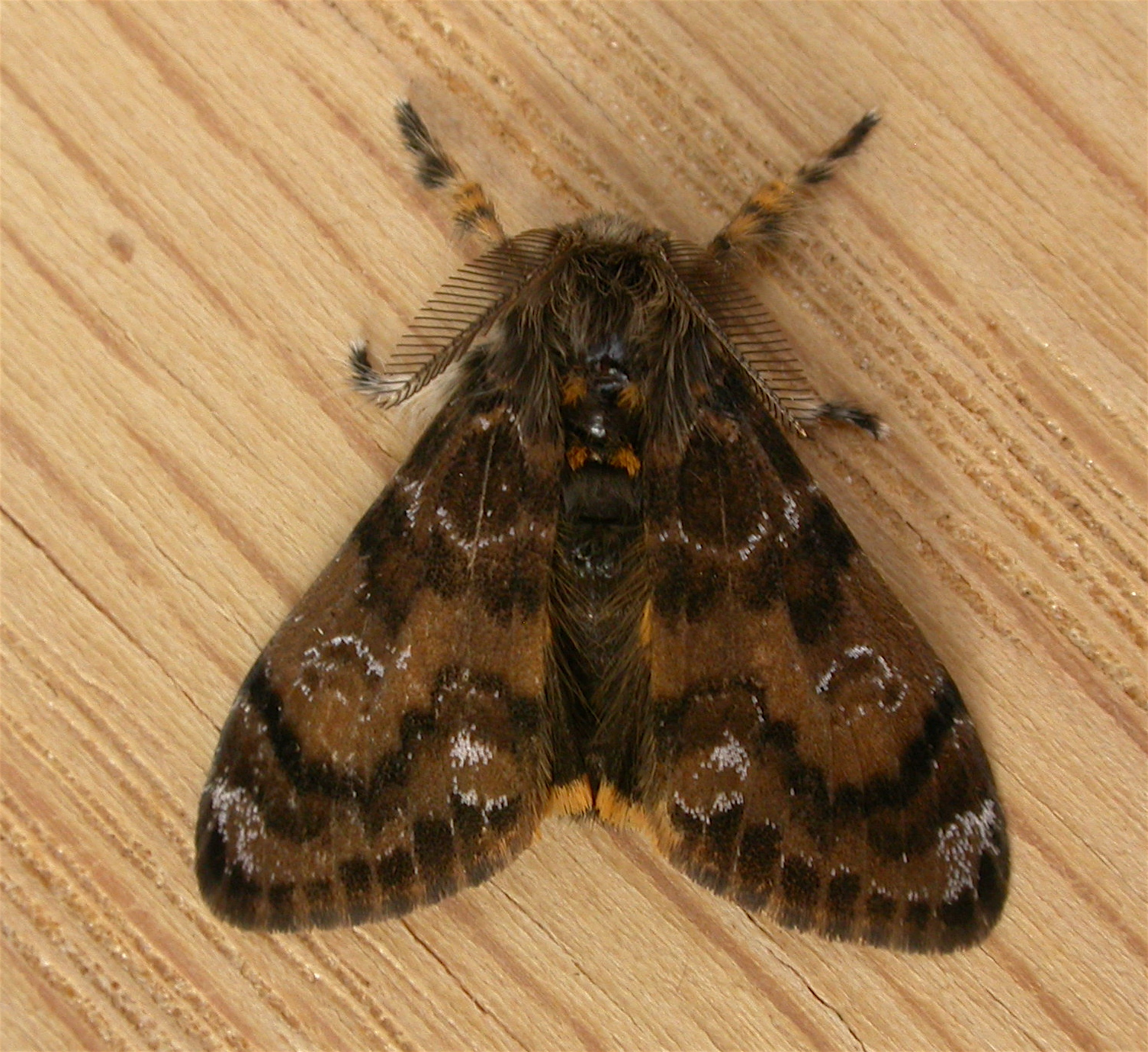
- Teia anartoides

Scientific classification
- Domain: Eukaryota
- Kingdom: Animalia
- Phylum: Arthropoda
- Class: Insecta
- Order: Lepidoptera
- Superfamily: Noctuoidea
- Family: Erebidae
- Tribe: Orgyiini
- Genus: Teia; Walker, 1855

= Teia (moth) =

Genus of moths

Teia is a genus of tussock moths in the family Erebidae first described by Francis Walker in 1855.

Some authors have treated this name as a synonym of Orgyia Ochsenheimer, 1810(e.g.), but molecular analyses suggest that it is a distinct lineage.

== Species ==
- Teia anartoides Walker, 1855 (type species)
- Teia athlophora (Turner, 1921)
- Teia parallela (Gaede, 1932)
- Teia sarramea (Holloway, 1979)
