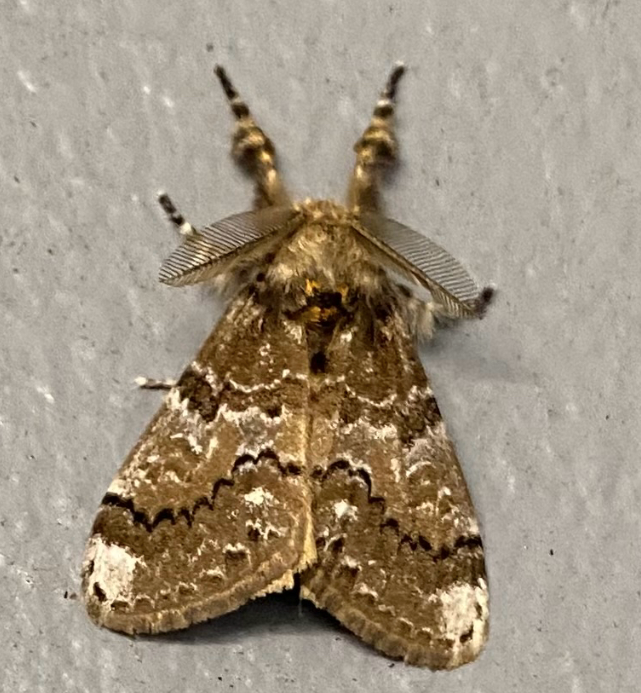

Scientific classification
- Kingdom: Animalia
- Phylum: Arthropoda
- Class: Insecta
- Order: Lepidoptera
- Superfamily: Noctuoidea
- Family: Erebidae
- Genus: Teia
- Species: T. athlophora

Binomial name
- Teia athlophora (Turner, 1921)

Synonyms
- Orgyia athlophora; Notolophus athlophora

= Teia athlophora =

Species of tussock moth

Teia athlophora is a species of tussock moth found in southwestern Australia. The type specimen was collected from Perth, Western Australia.

T. athlophora is about 3.4 to 3.8 cm in length, with an ochreous-grey head and thorax.
