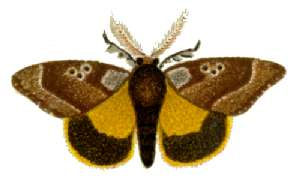

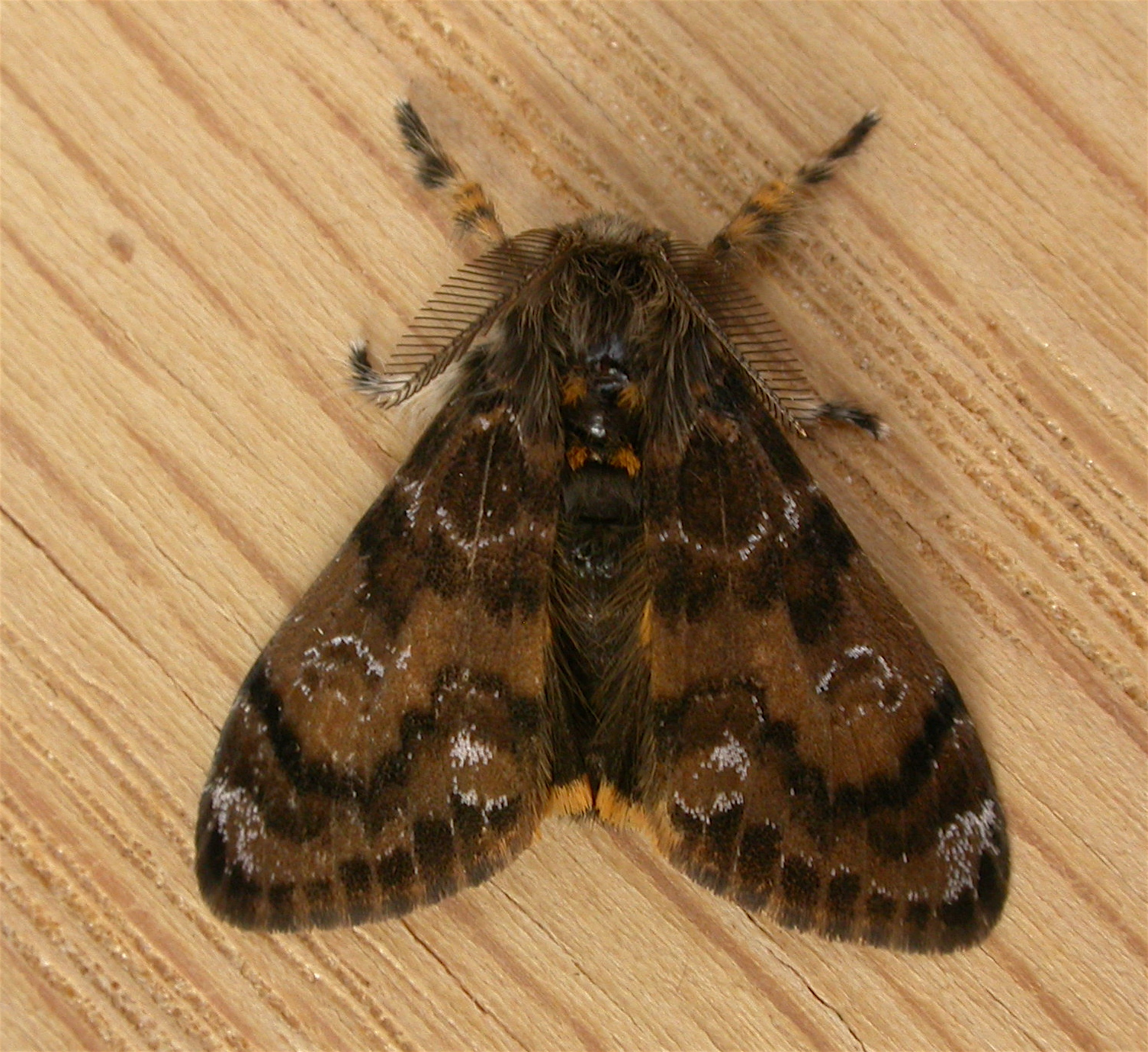

Scientific classification
- Kingdom: Animalia
- Phylum: Arthropoda
- Clade: Pancrustacea
- Class: Insecta
- Order: Lepidoptera
- Superfamily: Noctuoidea
- Family: Erebidae
- Genus: Teia
- Species: T. anartoides

Binomial name
- Teia anartoides Walker, 1855

Synonyms
- Teia pusilla Butler, 1882; Orgyia phineus Herrich-Schäffer, [1858]; Orgyia anartoides

= Painted apple moth =

Species of moth

The painted apple moth (Teia anartoides) is a tussock moth native to Australia. It is notable as a pest in pine forests, and is classified as a pest in New Zealand. Some sources still refer to this species as belonging to the genus Orgyia, but in 2015 the genus Teia was recognized as a separate lineage.

In May 1999 it was found in Glendene, a suburb of Auckland, New Zealand. A controversial spray programme was carried out to eradicate the moth.

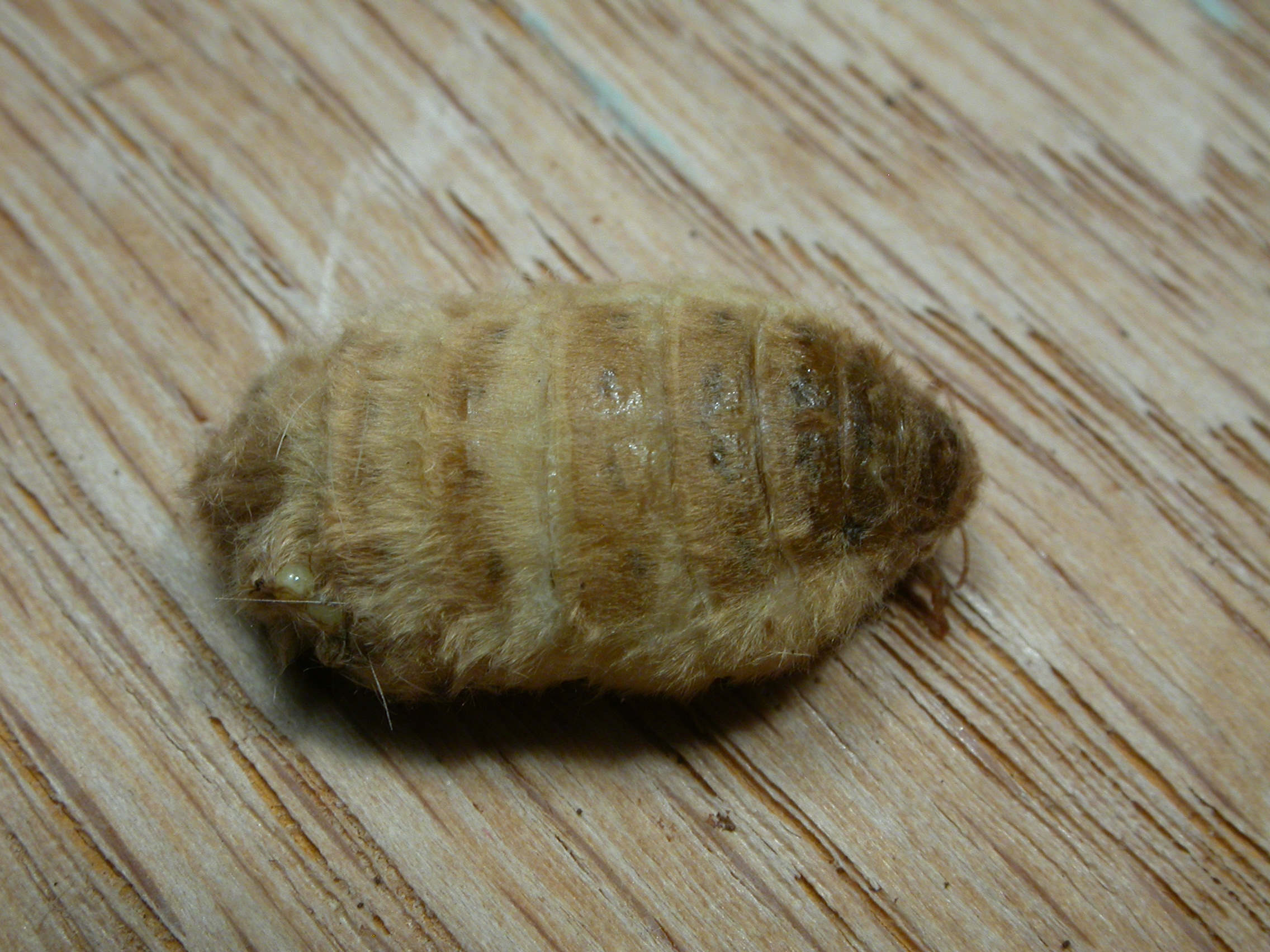
Female

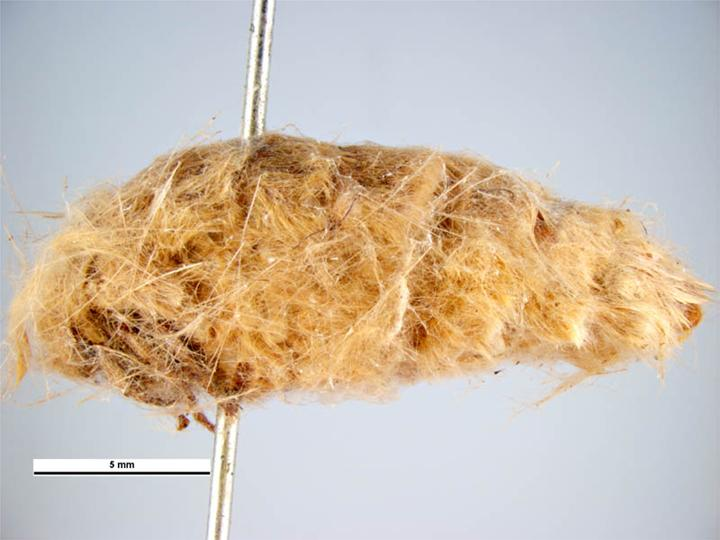
Female, side view

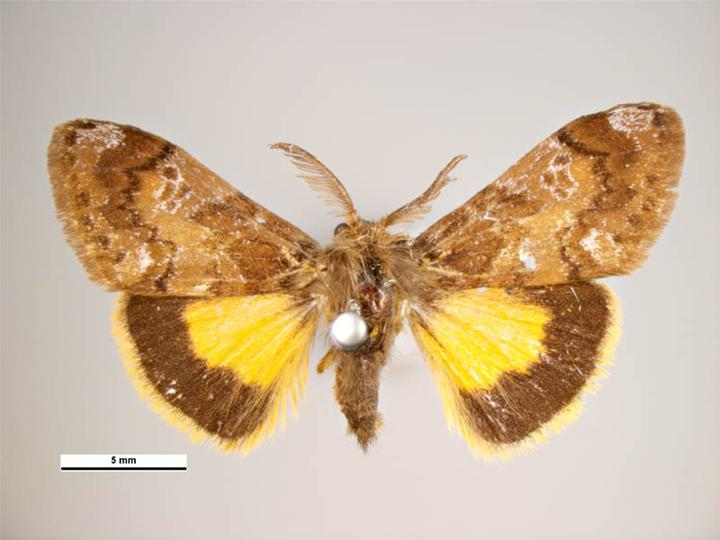
Male, dorsal view

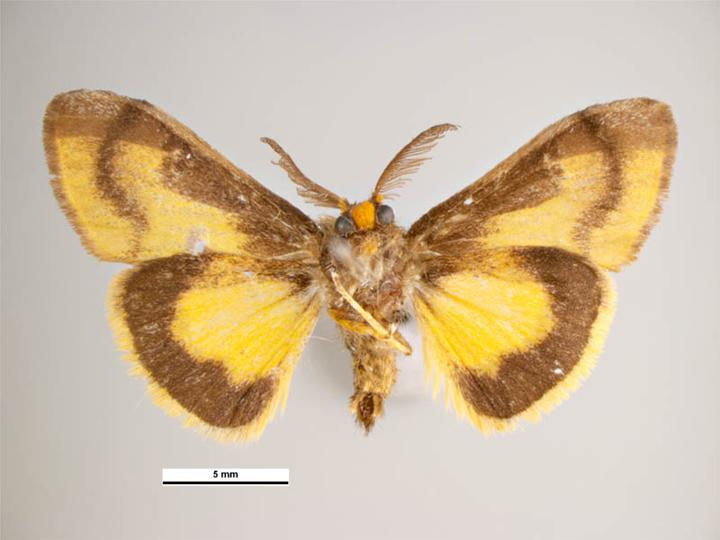
Male, ventral view

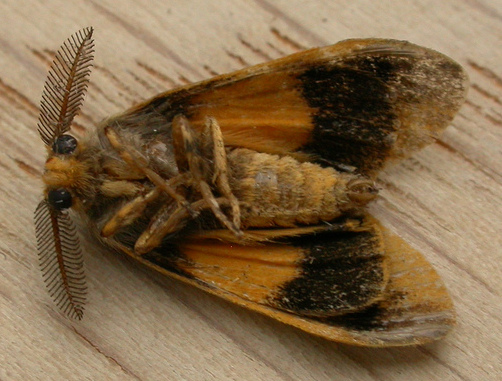
Adult bottom view

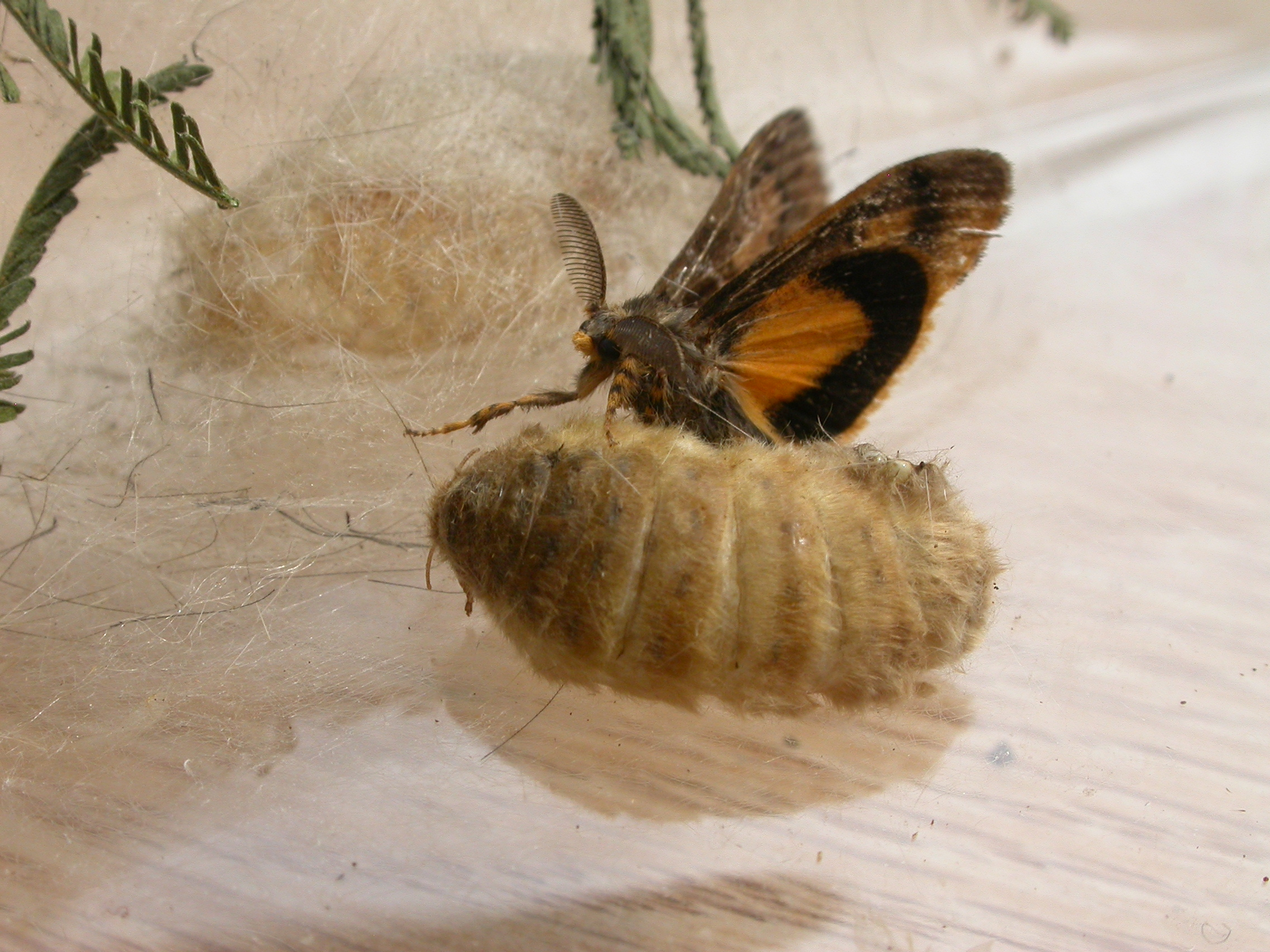
Mating

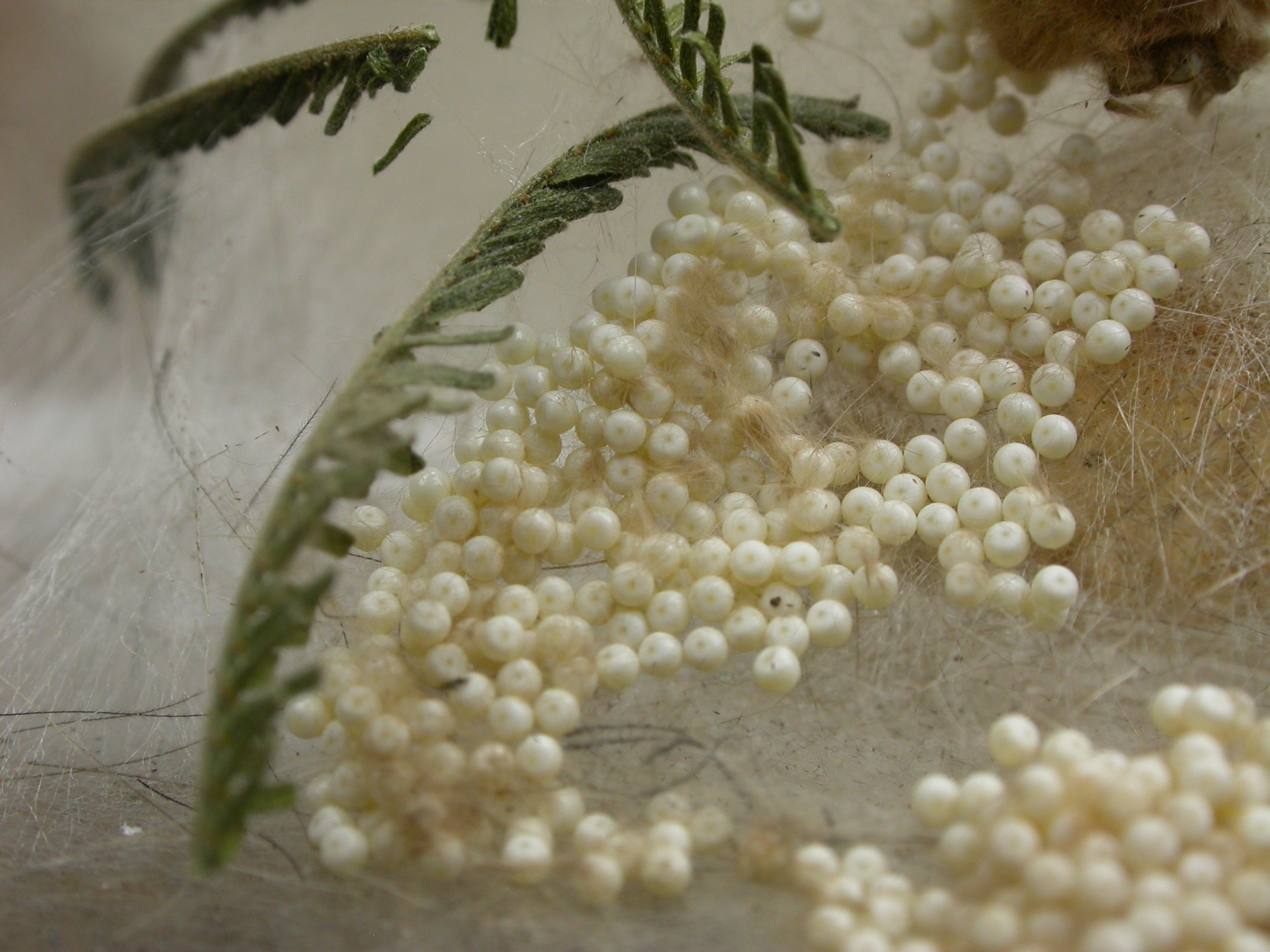
Eggs

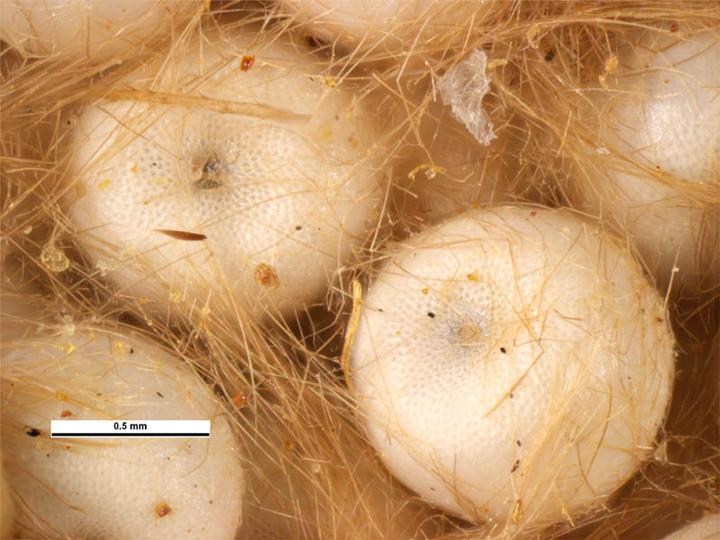
Egg, close-up

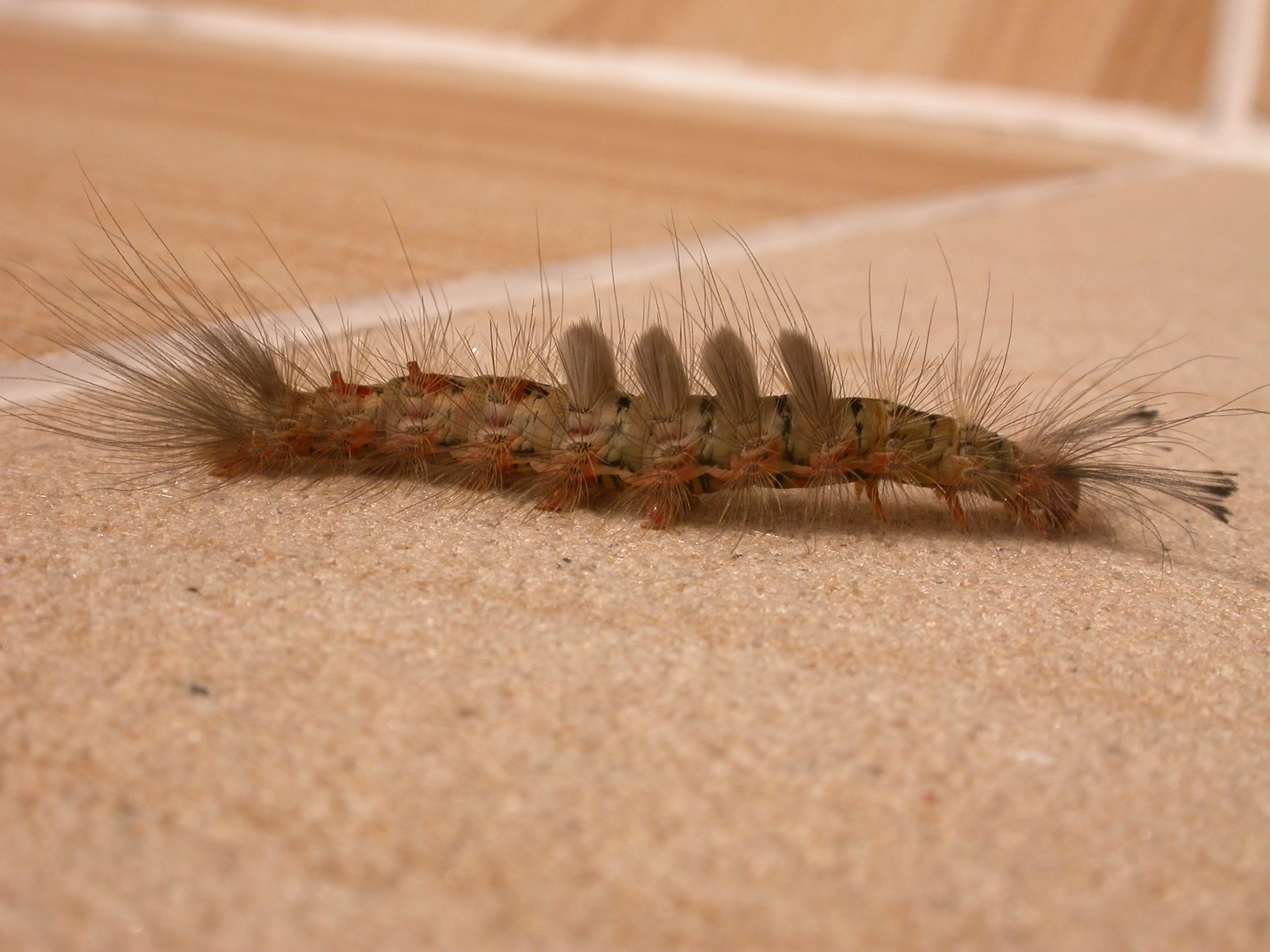
Caterpillar

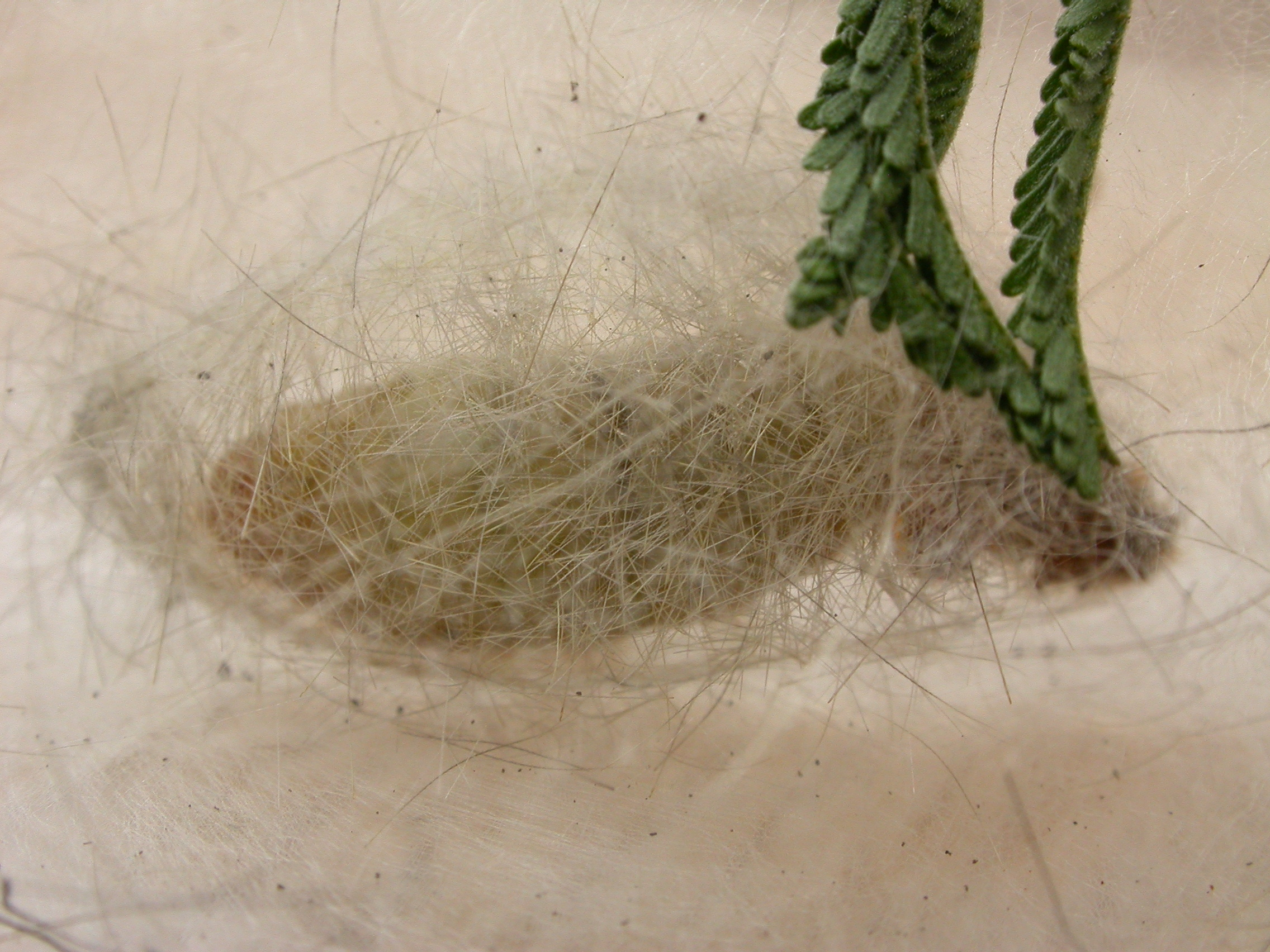
Pupa

== See also ==
- Painted apple moth in New Zealand
