= List of lymantriid genera: A =

The large moth subfamily Lymantriinae contains the following genera beginning with A:

- Abakabaka
- Abynotha
- Acyphas
- Adetoneura
- Albarracina
- Alina
- Allotoma
- Amphekes
- Anexotamos
- Ankova
- Aphomoeoma
- Arctornis
- Argyrostagma
- Arna
- Aroa
- Artaxa
- Aruta
