= List of lymantriid genera: M =

The large moth subfamily Lymantriinae contains the following genera beginning with M:

- Madema
- Mahoba
- Marbla
- Marblepsis
- Masoandro
- Medama
- Melgona
- Micraroa
- Micromorphe
- Microrgyia
- Mpanjaka
- Mylantria
