= List of lymantriid genera: R =

The large moth subfamily Lymantriinae contains the following genera beginning with R:

- Radamaria
- Rahona
- Rhypopteryx
- Rhypotoses
- Rivotra
- Ruanda
