= Medama =

The word medama may refer to the following:

- The Japanese word 目玉, literally meaning "eyeball"
- Medama-oyaji (目玉のおやじ, or 目玉親父, literally "Eyeball Father"), a character from GeGeGe no Kitaro
- Medama (moth), a genus of moths
- Greek name for Nicotera
