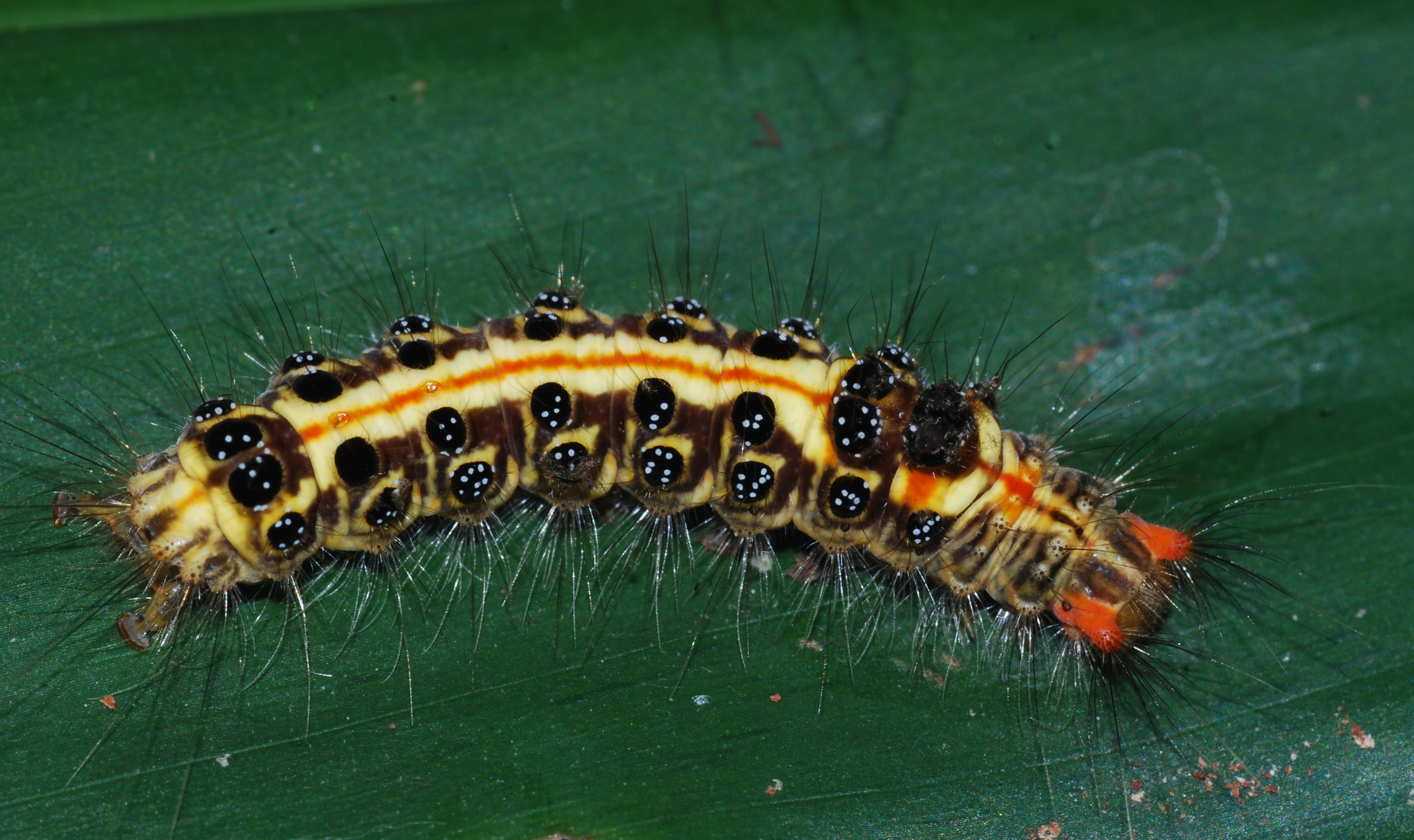

Scientific classification
- Domain: Eukaryota
- Kingdom: Animalia
- Phylum: Arthropoda
- Class: Insecta
- Order: Lepidoptera
- Superfamily: Noctuoidea
- Family: Erebidae
- Subfamily: Lymantriinae
- Tribe: Nygmiini
- Genus: Orvasca
- Species: O. subnotata

Binomial name
- Orvasca subnotata Walker, 1865

= Orvasca subnotata =

Species of moth

Orvasca subnotata is a nygmiine tussock moth in the family Erebidae, found in Indomalaya and East Asia, where it is known as a pest that feeds on millets. The species was first described by Francis Walker in 1865.

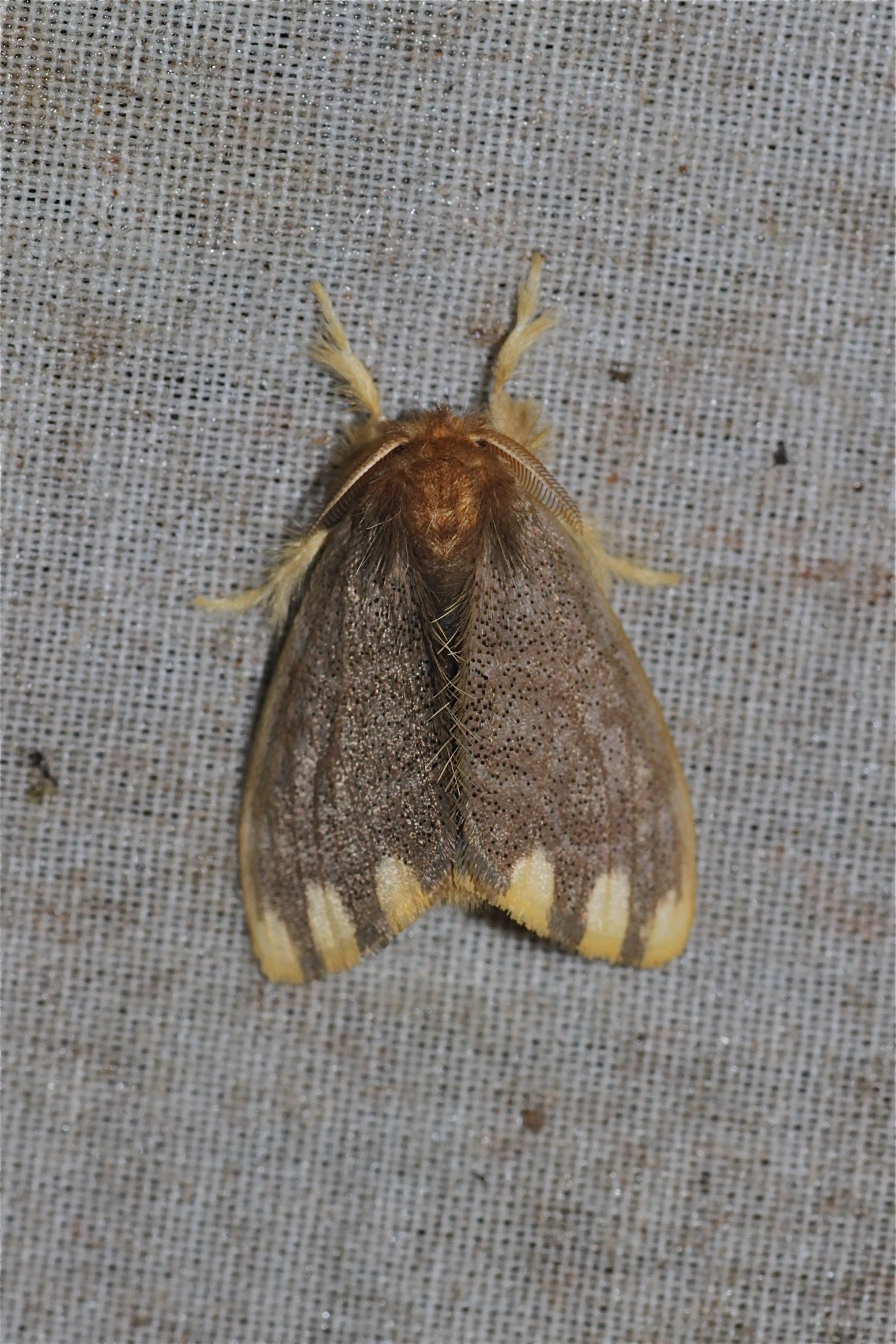
Orvasca subnotata
