= Artaxa angulata =

Scientific classification
- Kingdom: Animalia
- Phylum: Arthropoda
- Clade: Pancrustacea
- Class: Insecta
- Order: Lepidoptera
- Superfamily: Noctuoidea
- Family: Erebidae
- Genus: Artaxa
- Species: A. angulata

Binomial name
- Artaxa angulata (Matsumura, 1927)

Synonyms
- Euproctis angulata Matsumura, 1927

Species of moth

Artaxa angulata is a moth of the family Erebidae first described by Shōnen Matsumura in 1927. It is found in Taiwan, Myanmar, India, Pakistan, Sri Lanka, Malaysia, Singapore and Indonesia.

Its wingspan is about 14–20 mm. Forewings yellowish with two narrow, medially found pale yellow lines. Submarginal area with three black spots, where two of them at apex, and one near tornus.
