= Cozola =

Scientific classification
- Kingdom: Animalia
- Phylum: Arthropoda
- Class: Insecta
- Order: Lepidoptera
- Superfamily: Noctuoidea
- Family: Erebidae
- Tribe: Nygmiini
- Genus: Cozola; Walker, 1865

Synonyms
- Pronygmia Toxopeus, 1948

Genus of moths

Cozola is a genus of tussock moths in the family Erebidae. The genus was erected by Francis Walker in 1865.

== Species ==
The following species are included in the genus:

- Cozola acroptera Collenette, 1947
- Cozola ateralbus Rothschild, 1915
- Cozola austriaca Semper, 1899
- Cozola collenettei Nieuwenhuis, 1947
- Cozola defecta Strand, 1923
- Cozola dolichoptera Collenette, 1947
- Cozola geometrica Semper, 1899
- Cozola hapala Collenette, 1932
- Cozola leucospila Walker, 1865
- Cozola leucospiloides Strand, 1918
- Cozola menadoensis Collenette, 1933
- Cozola paloe Collenette, 1947
- Cozola parentheta Collenette, 1947
- Cozola submarginata Walker, 1865
- Cozola subrana Moore, 1859
- Cozola xanthopera Hampson, 1897
