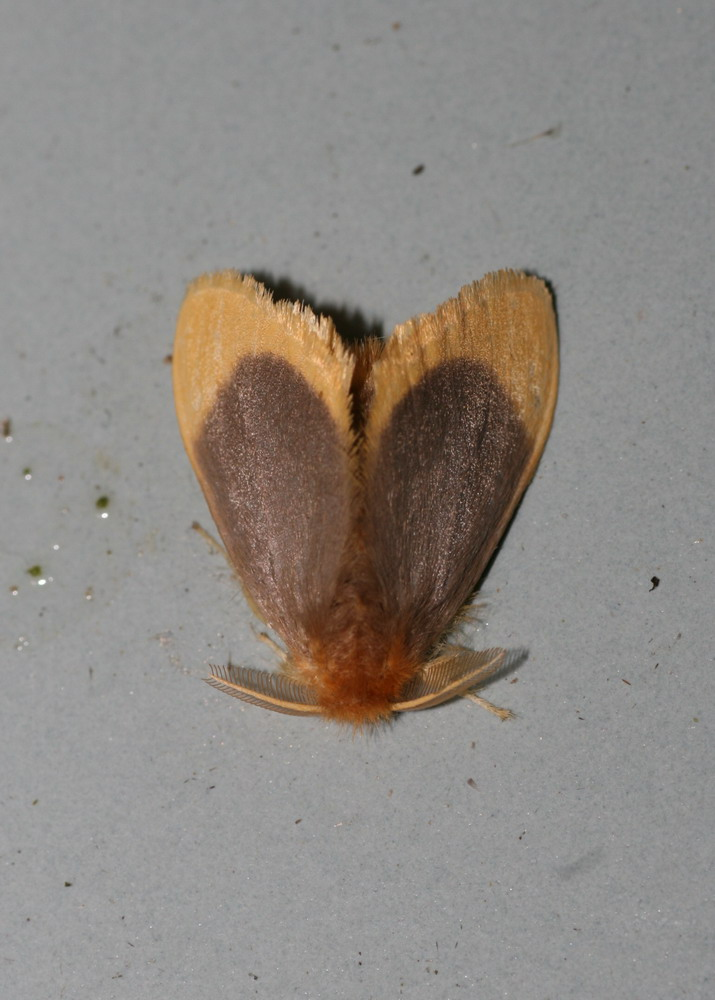

Scientific classification
- Domain: Eukaryota
- Kingdom: Animalia
- Phylum: Arthropoda
- Class: Insecta
- Order: Lepidoptera
- Superfamily: Noctuoidea
- Family: Erebidae
- Genus: Toxoproctis
- Species: T. cosmia

Binomial name
- Toxoproctis cosmia (Collenette, 1932)

Synonyms
- Euproctis cosmia Collenette, 1932

= Toxoproctis cosmia =

Species of moth

Toxoproctis cosmia is a moth of the family Erebidae. It is found in Sundaland.
