= Artaxa digramma =

Scientific classification
- Kingdom: Animalia
- Phylum: Arthropoda
- Clade: Pancrustacea
- Class: Insecta
- Order: Lepidoptera
- Superfamily: Noctuoidea
- Family: Erebidae
- Genus: Artaxa
- Species: A. digramma

Binomial name
- Artaxa digramma Boisduval, 1844

Synonyms
- Bombyx digramma Boisduval, 1844; Artaxa sastra Moore, [1860]; Nygmia sastra Swinhoe, 1922; Nygmia digramma Swinhoe, 1922; Euproctis digramma Collenette, 1932

Species of moth

Artaxa digramma is a moth of the family Erebidae first described by Jean Baptiste Boisduval in 1844. It is found in India, Sri Lanka, Myanmar, Nepal, Java, Borneo, and recently China.

== Description ==
The wingspan of the male is about 24 mm. Its head, thorax, abdomen and forewings are bright orange yellow, and its anal tuft is orange. The female has a large anal tuft. There is an orange spot at end of cell in forewing, and the hindwings are pale orange yellow. The two prominent subapical black spots are visible. Its palpi extend forward obliquely, reaching beyond the frons. Antennae are bipectinate (comb-like on both sides) in both sexes; however, in the male the branches are long. The mid tibiae have one pair of long spurs, whereas the hind tibiae have two pairs.

The caterpillar is known to feed on Mangifera, Anogeissus, Terminalia, Shorea, Lagerstroemia, Melastoma and Litchi species.
