= Bembina apicalis =

Scientific classification
- Kingdom: Animalia
- Phylum: Arthropoda
- Class: Insecta
- Order: Lepidoptera
- Superfamily: Noctuoidea
- Family: Erebidae
- Genus: Bembina
- Species: B. apicalis

Binomial name
- Bembina apicalis Walker, 1865

Synonyms
- Artaxa atomaria Walker, 1855; Nygmia lacipa Swinhoe, 1923; Euproctis flavotriangulata Gaede, 1932; Nygmia atomaria Swinhoe, 1923; Euproctis atomaria Collenette, 1932

Species of moth

Bembina apicalis is a moth of the family Erebidae first described by Francis Walker in 1865. It is found in India and Sri Lanka.

The caterpillar is known to feed on Terminalia species.
