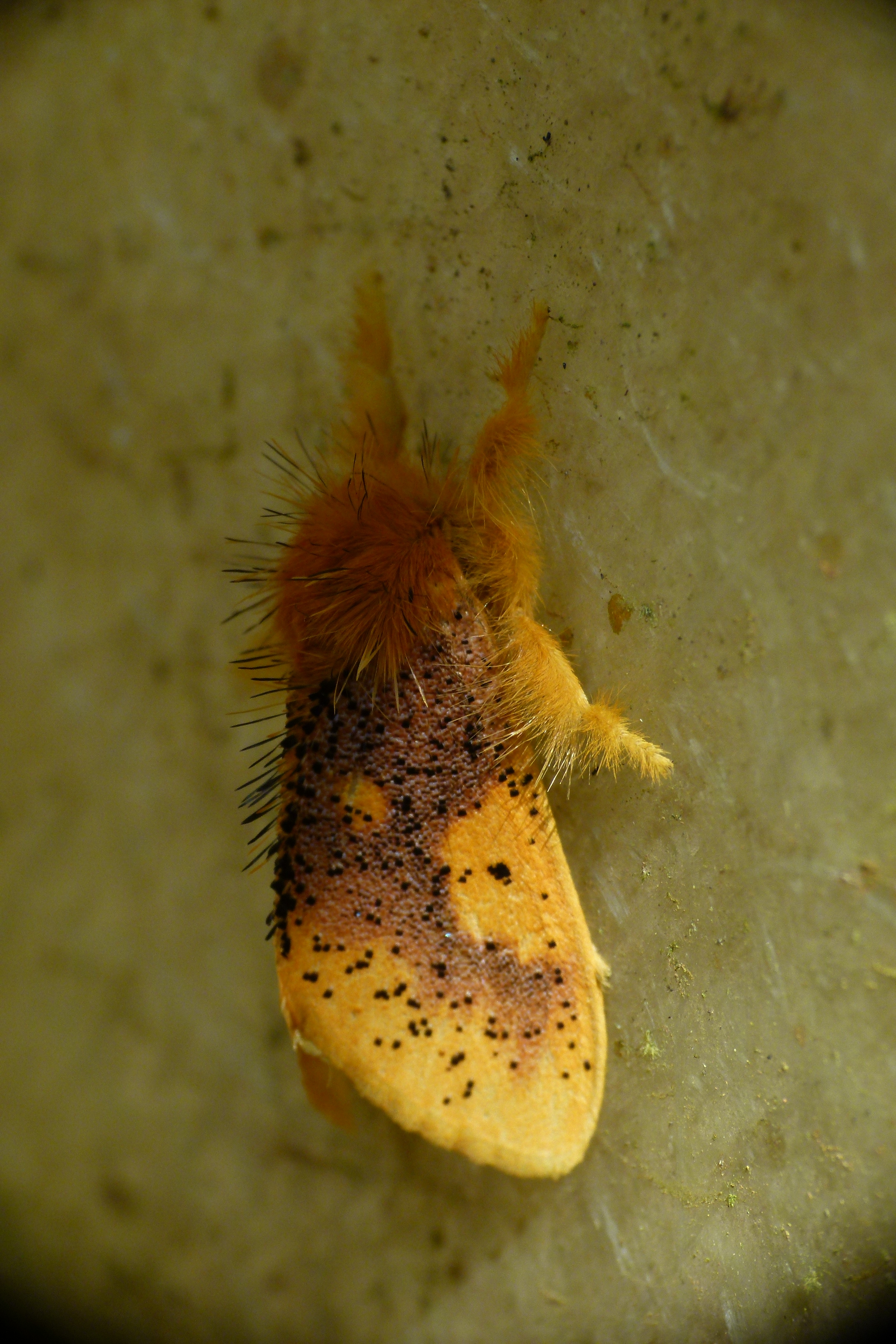
- Nygmia icilia from the Western Ghats of India

Scientific classification
- Kingdom: Animalia
- Phylum: Arthropoda
- Clade: Pancrustacea
- Class: Insecta
- Order: Lepidoptera
- Superfamily: Noctuoidea
- Family: Erebidae
- Tribe: Nygmiini
- Genus: Nygmia; Hübner, [1820]

Synonyms
- Adlullia Walker, 1865; Miccotrogia Toxopeus, 1948

= Nygmia =

Genus of moths

Nygmia is a genus of tussock moths in the family Erebidae. The genus was erected by Jacob Hübner in 1820.

== Species ==
- Nygmia aeruginosa (Collenette, 1932) New Guinea
- Nygmia amplior (Collenette, 1930) Sumatra, Borneo
- Nygmia araucaria (Collenette, 1955) New Guinea
- Nygmia aroa (Bethune-Baker, 1904) New Guinea
- Nygmia arrogans (Lucas, 1900) Australia
- Nygmia atereta (Collenette, 1932) Sundaland
- Nygmia atrisignata (Swinhoe, 1903) Sundaland
- Nygmia barbara (Swinhoe, 1903) Borneo
- Nygmia baueri (Schintlmeister, 1994) Peninsular Malaysia, Sumatra, Borneo
- Nygmia castor (Collenette, 1949) Java, Borneo
- Nygmia chirunda (Swinhoe, 1903) Borneo, Sumatra, Malaysia
- Nygmia civitta (Swinhoe, 1903) Borneo, Peninsular Malaysia, Sumatra
- Nygmia corbetti Tams, 1928 Peninsular Malaysia, Sumatra
- Nygmia dirtea (Swinhoe, 1905) Borneo
- Nygmia discophora (Snellen, 1879) Sulawesi
- Nygmia epirotica (Collenette, 1932) Peninsular Malaysia, Sumatra
- Nygmia exitela (Collenette, 1949) Java, Sumatra, Borneo
- Nygmia fumosa (Snellen, 1877) Sundaland
- Nygmia funeralis (Swinhoe, 1903) Sundaland
- Nygmia guttistriga (Walker, 1862) Borneo, Natuna Islands, Sumatra
- Nygmia guttulata (Snellen, 1886) Sundaland
- Nygmia habrostola (Turner, 1902) Australia
- Nygmia helladia (Stoll, [1782]) Japan
- Nygmia icilia (Stoll, [1790]) Sri Lanka, India
- Nygmia javana (Aurivillius, 1894) Sundaland
- Nygmia javanoides Holloway, 1999 Borneo, Sumatra
- Nygmia lali (Schintlmeister, 1994) Sumatra, Borneo
- Nygmia longitegumen Holloway, 1999 Borneo
- Nygmia lunifera (Walker, 1865) Sulawesi
- Nygmia mignon (Schintlmeister, 1994) Sumatra
- Nygmia moalata (Swinhoe, 1916) Borneo, Peninsular Malaysia, Sumatra
- Nygmia nova (Schintlmeister, 1994) Sumatra, Peninsular Malaysia, Borneo
- Nygmia ochreata (Walker, 1865) Ambon
- Nygmia oonophora (Collenette, 1938) Sumatra, Borneo, Peninsular Malaysia
- Nygmia panselena (Collenette, 1931) New Guinea
- Nygmia pelopicta (Collenette, 1932) Peninsular Malaysia
- Nygmia peperites (Collenette, 1932) Peninsular Malaysia, Sumatra, Borneo
- Nygmia plana (Walker, 1856) India
- Nygmia poppaea (Collenette, 1953) Borneo, Peninsular Malaysia, Sumatra
- Nygmia postgrisea (Rothschild, 1920) Sundaland
- Nygmia protea (Collenette, 1932) Peninsular Malaysia
- Nygmia puli (Schintlmeister, 1994) Sumatra, Peninsular Malaysia, Borneo
- Nygmia punctatofasciata (van Eecke, 1928) Sumatra
- Nygmia rubida (Bethune-Baker, 1910) New Guinea
- Nygmia rubroradiata (Bethune-Baker, 1904) New Guinea
- Nygmia semifumosa (Holloway, 1976) Borneo
- Nygmia sinuinigra (Holloway, 1976) Borneo
- Nygmia solitaria (van Eecke, 1928) Sumatra, Peninsular Malaysia, Borneo
- Nygmia sublutea (Bethune-Baker, 1904) New Guinea
- Nygmia talesea (Collenette, 1932)
- Nygmia tamsi (Collenette, 1932) Peninsular Malaysia, Sumatra
- Nygmia tigris Holloway, 1999 Borneo
- Nygmia venata (Collenette, 1953) Sumatra, Borneo
- Nygmia xanthomela (Walker, 1862) Borneo, Peninsular Malaysia
- Nygmia zeboe (Moore, 1859) Java
