= Themaca comparata =

Scientific classification
- Kingdom: Animalia
- Phylum: Arthropoda
- Class: Insecta
- Order: Lepidoptera
- Family: Erebidae
- Genus: Themaca
- Species: T. comparata

Binomial name
- Themaca comparata Walker, 1865

Synonyms
- Artaxa comparata (Walker, 1865)

Species of moth

Themaca comparata is a moth of the family Erebidae first described by Francis Walker in 1865. It is found in India and Sri Lanka. It is sometimes placed in the genus Artaxa.
