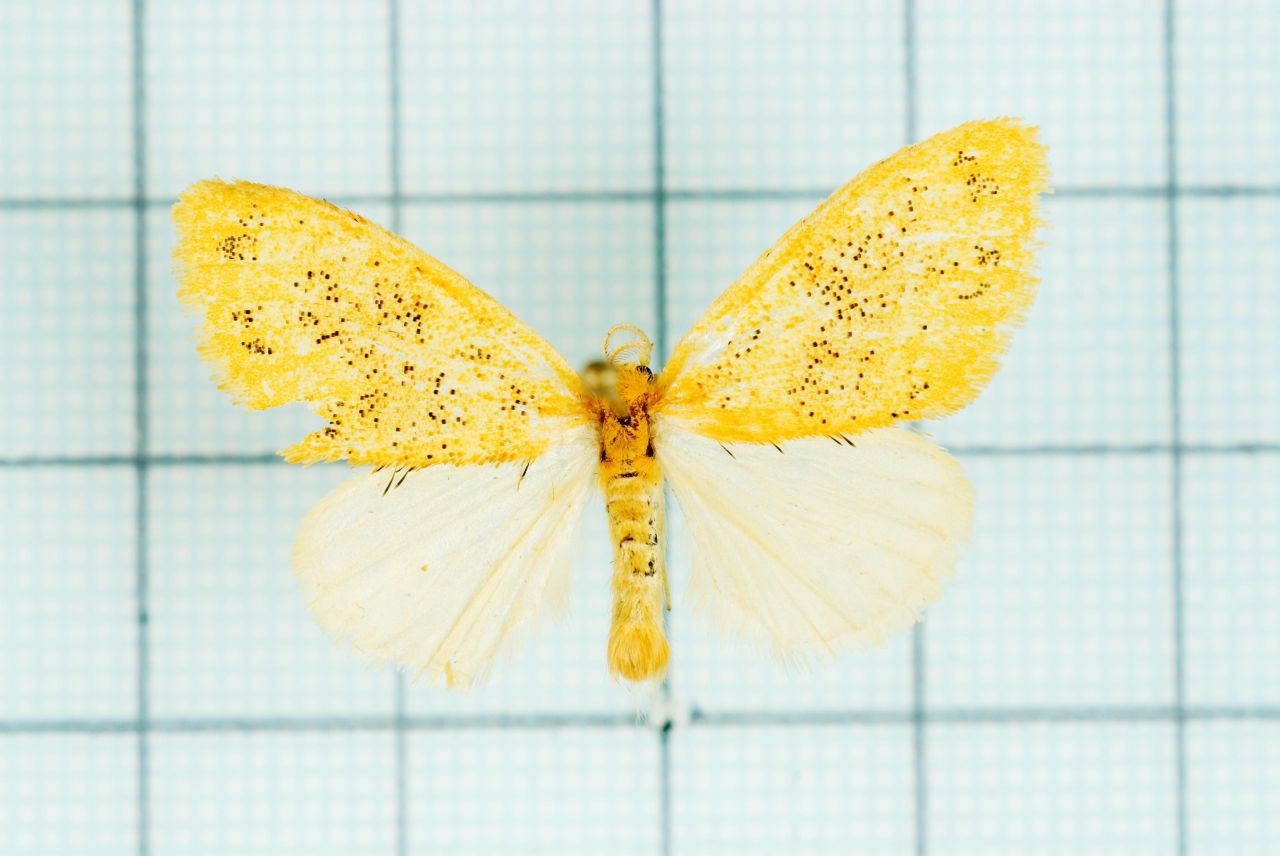

Scientific classification
- Domain: Eukaryota
- Kingdom: Animalia
- Phylum: Arthropoda
- Class: Insecta
- Order: Lepidoptera
- Superfamily: Noctuoidea
- Family: Erebidae
- Genus: Toxoproctis
- Species: T. croceola

Binomial name
- Toxoproctis croceola (Strand, 1918)

Synonyms
- Euproctis croceola Strand, 1918; Euproctis crocea Wileman, 1910 (preocc.)

= Toxoproctis croceola =

Species of moth

Toxoproctis croceola is a moth of the subfamily Lymantriinae first described by Embrik Strand in 1918. It is found in Taiwan and China.

The wingspan is 26–42 mm. Adults are on wing from April to September.
