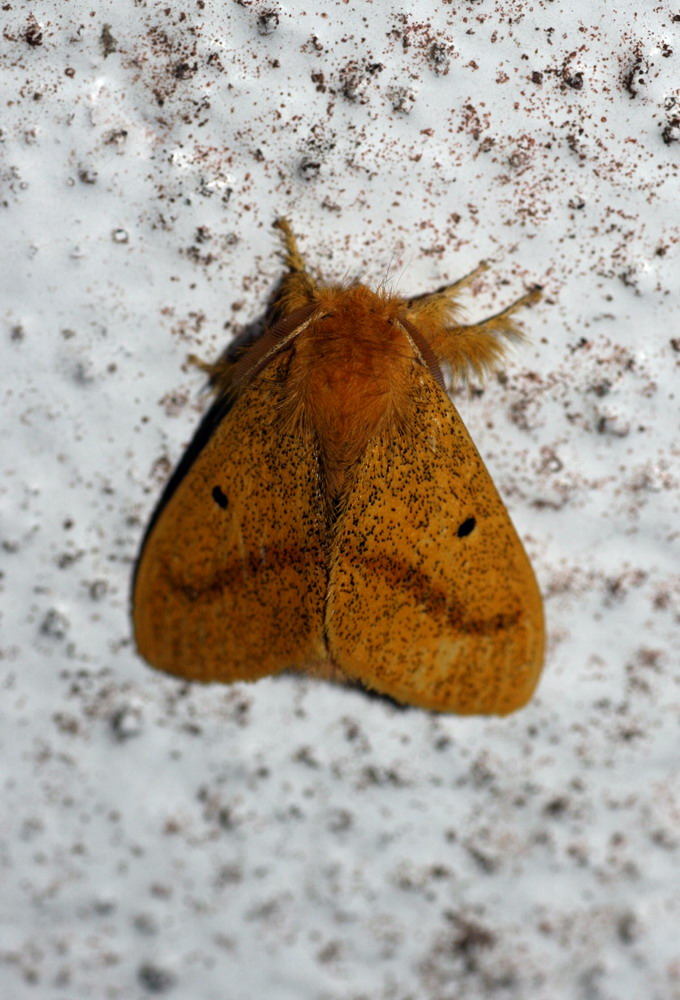

Scientific classification
- Kingdom: Animalia
- Phylum: Arthropoda
- Class: Insecta
- Order: Lepidoptera
- Superfamily: Noctuoidea
- Family: Erebidae
- Genus: Nygmia
- Species: N. plana

Binomial name
- Nygmia plana (Walker, 1856)

Synonyms
- Euproctis plana Walker, [1856]; Chaerotriche immaculata Butler, [1881]

= Nygmia plana =

Species of moth found in Asia

Nygmia plana is a moth in the family Erebidae first described by Francis Walker in 1856. It has been spotted in India, Bangladesh, Nepal, Bhutan, China, Thailand, Cambodia, Vietnam, Laos, Malaysia, Indonesia, Philippines and Japan.

== Description ==
This species of moths is not very apparently sexually dimorphic. Its wingspan is around 2-5 centimeters long, and its entire body is mostly orange. It has one distinct black spot on either wings.

== Life cycle ==
While its life cycle has not yet been deeply studied, many caterpillars of Nygmia plana have been observed. It has white-colored spikes and a yellow, black and red colored body, but can also appear without spikes.
