= Choerotricha =

Scientific classification
- Kingdom: Animalia
- Phylum: Arthropoda
- Clade: Pancrustacea
- Class: Insecta
- Order: Lepidoptera
- Superfamily: Noctuoidea
- Family: Erebidae
- Tribe: Nygmiini
- Genus: Choerotricha; Felder, 1874

Synonyms
- Gogana Walker, 1866

Genus of moths

Choerotricha is a genus of tussock moths in the family Erebidae. The genus was described by Felder in 1874.

== Species ==
The following species are included in the genus.

- Choerotricha atrosquamata Walker, 1866
- Choerotricha biflava Holloway, 1976
- Choerotricha indistincta Rothschild, 1920
