= Kidokuga =

Scientific classification
- Domain: Eukaryota
- Kingdom: Animalia
- Phylum: Arthropoda
- Class: Insecta
- Order: Lepidoptera
- Superfamily: Noctuoidea
- Family: Erebidae
- Tribe: Nygmiini
- Genus: Kidokuga; Kishida, 2010

Genus of moths

Kidokuga is a genus of tussock moths in the family Erebidae. The genus was erected by Yasunori Kishida in 2010. It is considered a synonym of the related genus Euproctis by some authors, but recognized as valid by others (e.g.), and supported as distinct in molecular phylogenetic studies.

== Species ==
- Kidokuga piperita (Oberthür, 1880)
- Kidokuga torasan (Holland, 1889)
