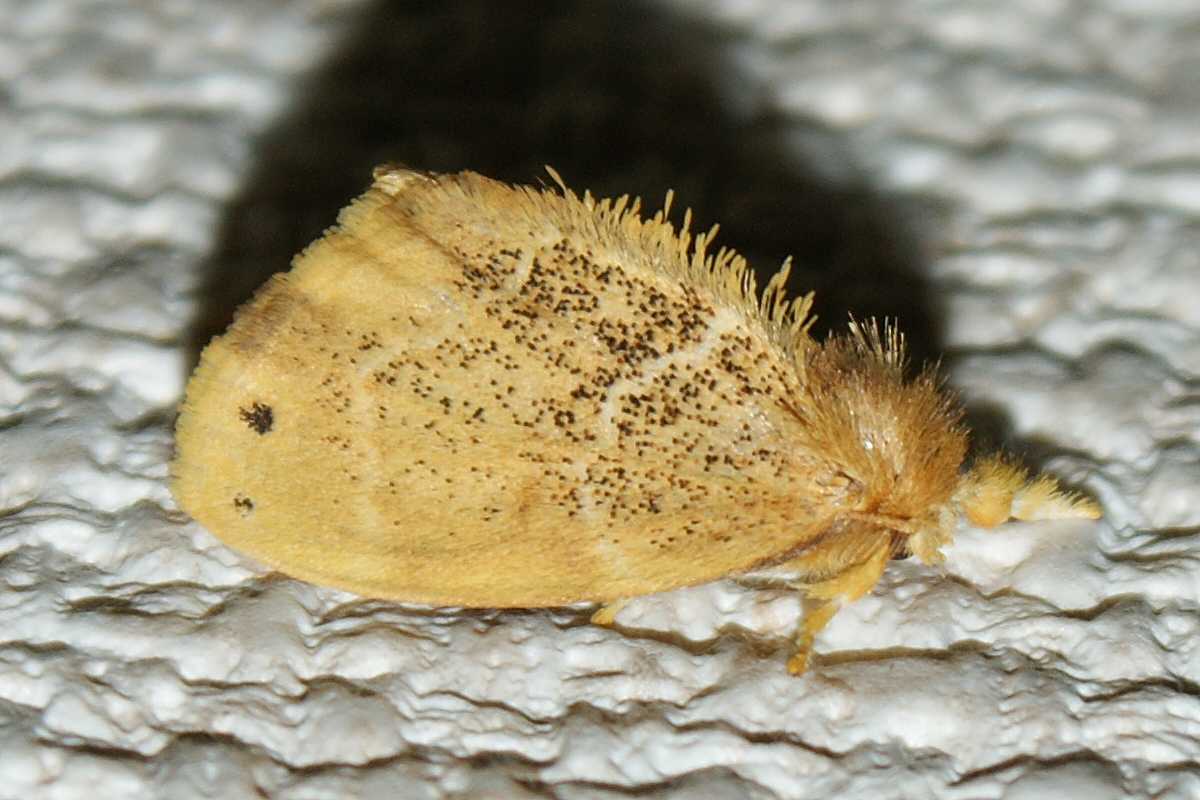

Scientific classification
- Domain: Eukaryota
- Kingdom: Animalia
- Phylum: Arthropoda
- Class: Insecta
- Order: Lepidoptera
- Superfamily: Noctuoidea
- Family: Erebidae
- Genus: Arna
- Species: A. pseudoconspersa

Binomial name
- Arna pseudoconspersa Strand, 1914

Synonyms
- Euproctis pseudoconspersa

= Arna pseudoconspersa =

Species of moth

Arna pseudoconspersa, the tea tussock moth or Japanese browntail moth, is a moth of the family Erebidae. The species was first described by Embrik Strand in 1914. It is found in Japan, Taiwan, Korea, China, Vietnam and India.

Both the larvae and the adult moths have "hairs" containing toxins that cause rashes, and even dizziness and nausea in humans. It is also a harmful pest.

The wingspan is 13–18 mm.

The larvae feed on Camellia species.

Arna pseudoconspersa filmed in Tokyo, Japan
