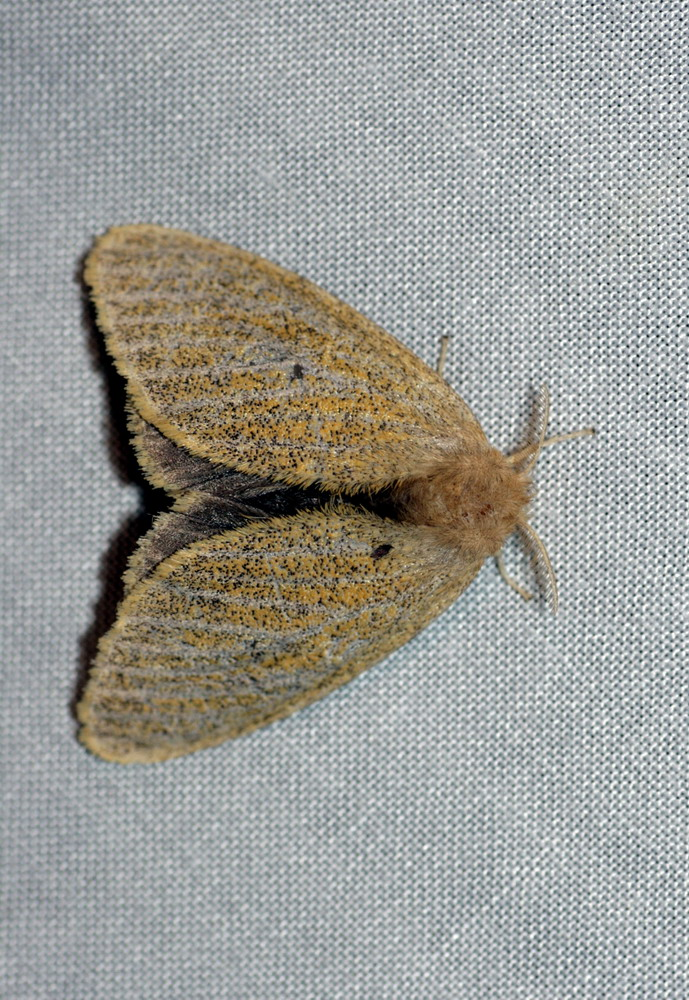

Scientific classification
- Kingdom: Animalia
- Phylum: Arthropoda
- Clade: Pancrustacea
- Class: Insecta
- Order: Lepidoptera
- Superfamily: Noctuoidea
- Family: Erebidae
- Genus: Nygmia
- Species: N. semifumosa

Binomial name
- Nygmia semifumosa (Holloway, 1976)

Synonyms
- Euproctis semifumosa Holloway, 1976

= Nygmia semifumosa =

Species of moth

Nygmia semifumosa is a moth of the family Erebidae. It is endemic to Borneo. Males have a characteristically sparse and irregular scattering of black scales on the yellow forewing. Females have a similar, but even more sparse scattering, and diagnostic white patches; the hindwings are dark grey to about two thirds.
