= Arna apicalis =

Scientific classification
- Kingdom: Animalia
- Phylum: Arthropoda
- Class: Insecta
- Order: Lepidoptera
- Superfamily: Noctuoidea
- Family: Erebidae
- Genus: Arna
- Species: A. apicalis

Binomial name
- Arna apicalis Walker, 1865

Synonyms
- Nygmia apicalis Swinhoe, 1923

Species of moth

Arna apicalis is a moth of the family Erebidae first described by Francis Walker in 1865. It is found in Sri Lanka.
