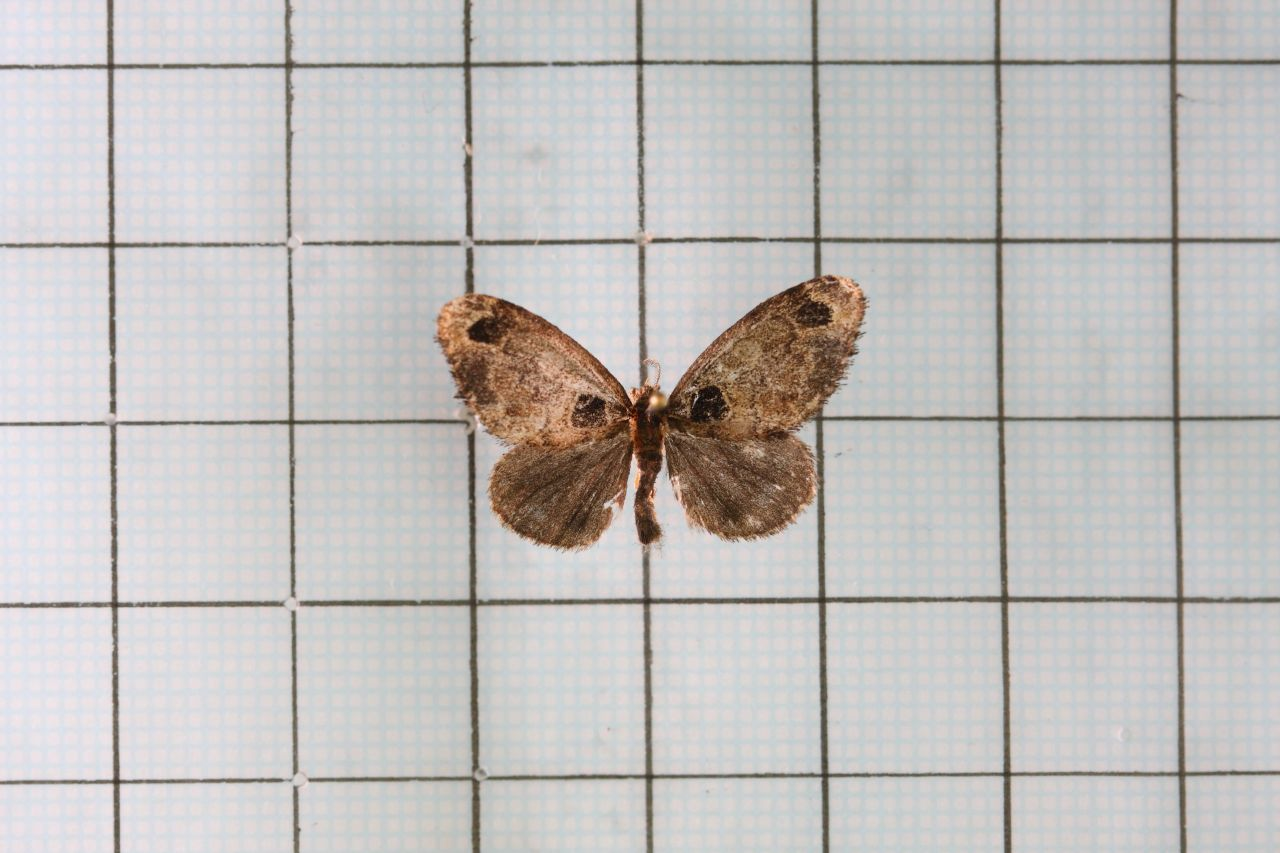

Scientific classification
- Kingdom: Animalia
- Phylum: Arthropoda
- Class: Insecta
- Order: Lepidoptera
- Superfamily: Noctuoidea
- Family: Erebidae
- Genus: Medama
- Species: M. diplaga

Binomial name
- Medama diplaga (Hampson, 1910)

Synonyms
- Euproctis diplaga Hampson, 1910; Nygmia diplaga; Medama basimaculatum Matsumura, 1931

= Medama diplaga =

Species of moth

Medama diplaga is a moth in the family Erebidae first described by George Hampson in 1910. It is found in Taiwan and India.
