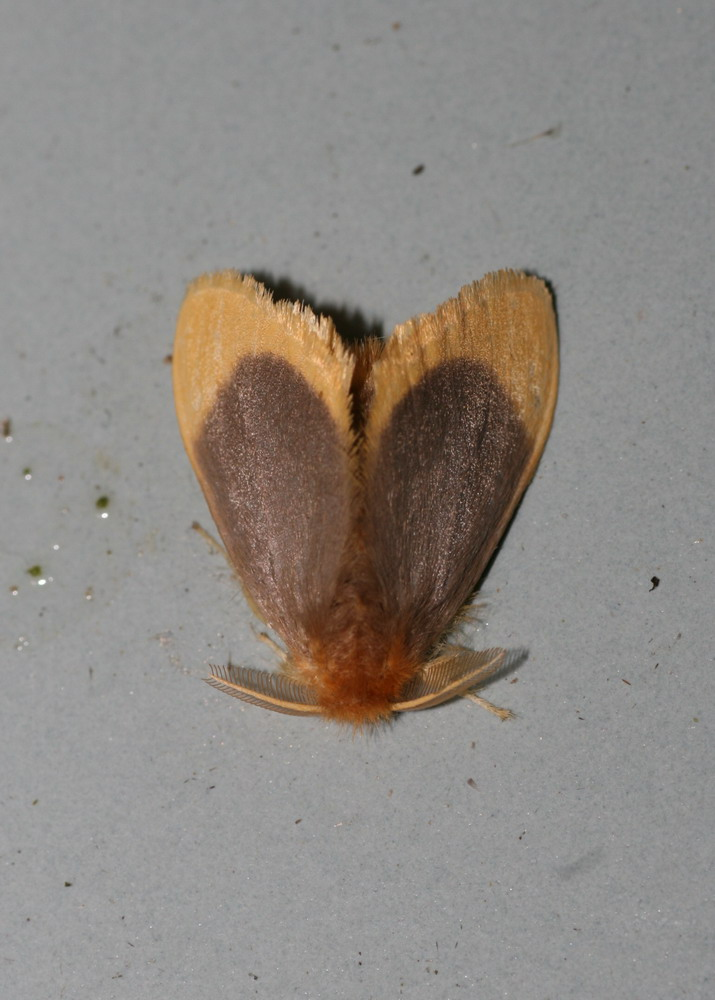
- Toxoproctis cosmia

Scientific classification
- Kingdom: Animalia
- Phylum: Arthropoda
- Clade: Pancrustacea
- Class: Insecta
- Order: Lepidoptera
- Superfamily: Noctuoidea
- Family: Erebidae
- Tribe: Nygmiini
- Genus: Toxoproctis; Holloway, 1999

= Toxoproctis =

Genus of moths

Toxoproctis is a genus of tussock moths in the family Erebidae. The genus was erected by Jeremy Daniel Holloway in 1999.

== Species ==
The following species are included in the genus:

- Toxoproctis adrian Schintlmeister, 1994
- Toxoproctis alticosmia Holloway, 1999
- Toxoproctis altilodra Holloway, 1976
- Toxoproctis anna Swinhoe, 1903
- Toxoproctis bifurcata van Eecke, 1928
- Toxoproctis celidota Collenette, 1932
- Toxoproctis cheela Swinhoe, 1903
- Toxoproctis cincta Swinhoe, 1906
- Toxoproctis coniochroa Bethune-Baker, 1908
- Toxoproctis cosmia Collenette, 1932
- Toxoproctis croceola (Strand, 1918)
- Toxoproctis deliana van Eecke, 1928
- Toxoproctis despina Schintlmeister, 1994
- Toxoproctis dyssema Collenette, 1932
- Toxoproctis eumorpha Collenette, 1932
- Toxoproctis flavociliata Swinhoe, 1901
- Toxoproctis flavolimbata Aurivillius, 1894
- Toxoproctis helpsi Holloway, 1999
- Toxoproctis hemibathes Swinhoe, 1906
- Toxoproctis hemixanthoides Holloway, 1999
- Toxoproctis hypolispa Collenette, 1932
- Toxoproctis icoinnotata Collenette, 1947
- Toxoproctis innotata Walker, 1865
- Toxoproctis layi Schintlmeister, 1994
- Toxoproctis munda Walker, 1862
- Toxoproctis signiplaga Walker, 1862
- Toxoproctis willotti Holloway, 1999
