= Lacida (moth) =

Scientific classification
- Domain: Eukaryota
- Kingdom: Animalia
- Phylum: Arthropoda
- Class: Insecta
- Order: Lepidoptera
- Superfamily: Noctuoidea
- Family: Erebidae
- Subfamily: Lymantriinae
- Tribe: Nygmiini
- Genus: Lacida; Walker, 1855

Synonyms
- Antipha Walker, 1855; Utidava Walker, [1863]

Genus of moths

Lacida is a genus of tussock moths in the family Erebidae. The genus was erected by Francis Walker in 1855.

== Species ==
The following species are included in the genus:

- Lacida antica Walker, 1855
- Lacida biplagata Heylaerts, 1892
- Lacida costalis Walker, 1855
- Lacida incomptaria Walker, 1862
- Lacida morawae van Eecke, 1928
- Lacida vertiginosa van Eecke, 1928
