= Artaxa vitellina =

Scientific classification
- Domain: Eukaryota
- Kingdom: Animalia
- Phylum: Arthropoda
- Class: Insecta
- Order: Lepidoptera
- Superfamily: Noctuoidea
- Family: Erebidae
- Genus: Artaxa
- Species: A. vitellina

Binomial name
- Artaxa vitellina (Kollar, 1848)

Synonyms
- Liparis vitellina Kollar, 1848; Euproctis gamma Walker, 1856; Artaxa princeps Walker, 1865; Nygmia vitellina Swinhoe, 1922

Species of moth

Artaxa vitellina is a moth of the family Erebidae first described by Vincenz Kollar in 1848. It is found in India and Sri Lanka.

The caterpillar is a minor pest of Ricinus communis.
