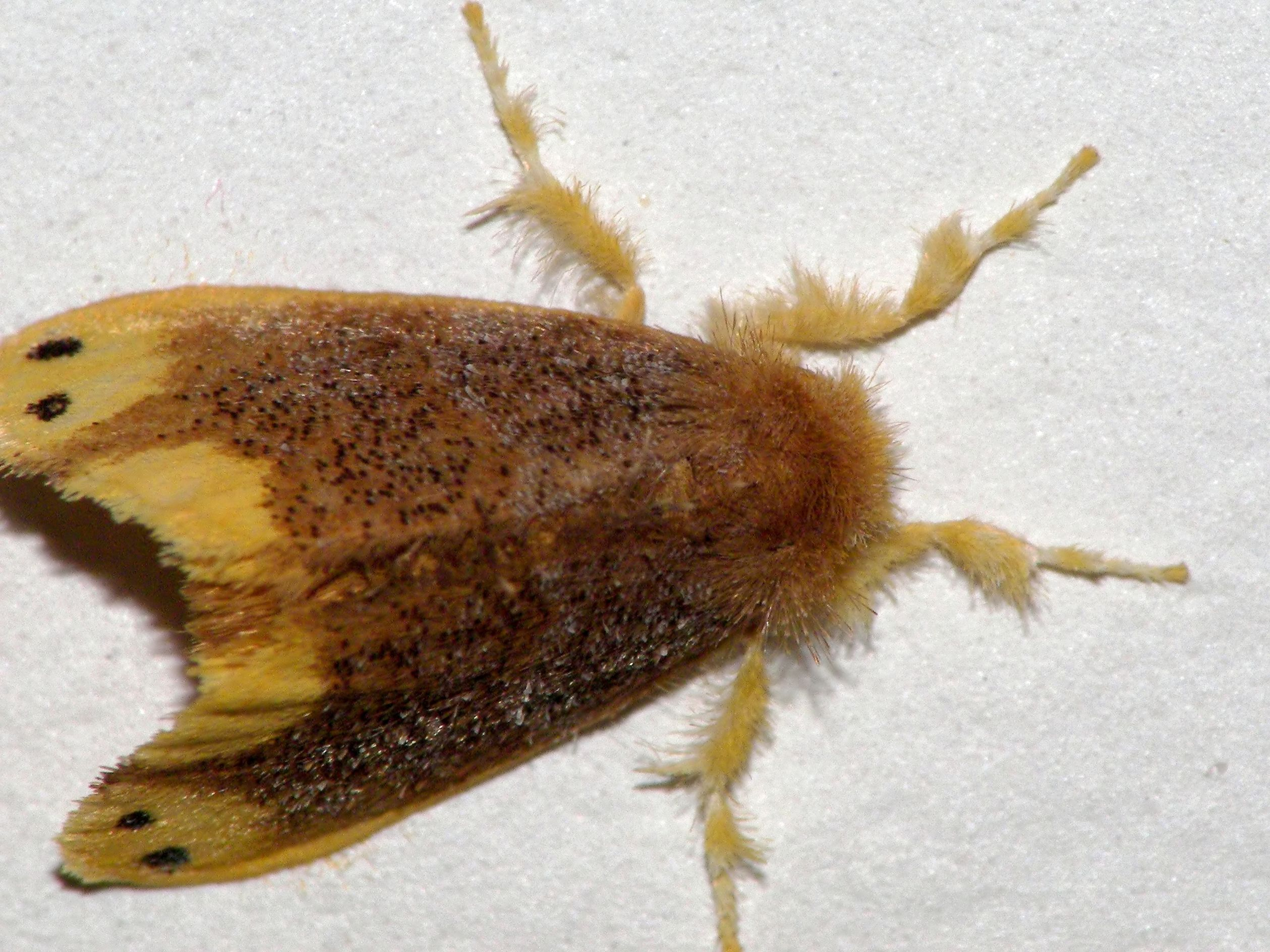
- Dorsal view
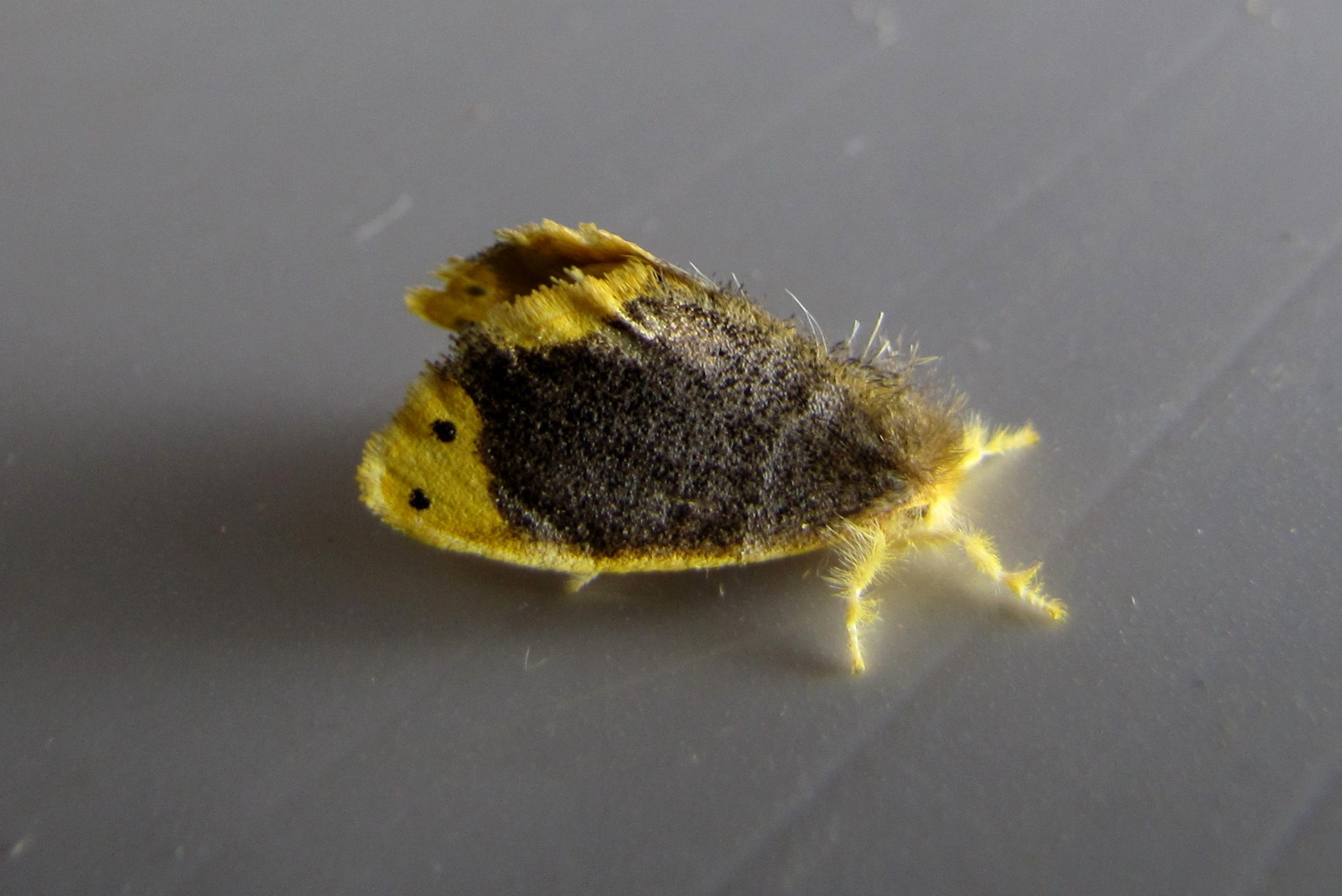
- Side view

Scientific classification
- Kingdom: Animalia
- Phylum: Arthropoda
- Class: Insecta
- Order: Lepidoptera
- Superfamily: Noctuoidea
- Family: Erebidae
- Genus: Arna
- Species: A. bipunctapex

Binomial name
- Arna bipunctapex Hampson, 1891

Synonyms
- Somena bipunctapex; Euproctix bipunctapex

= Arna bipunctapex =

Species of moth

Arna bipunctapex is a species of moth in the family Erebidae. It is found from India to Indochina and in Taiwan and Sundaland.

The larvae feed on Sepium, Terminalia, Shorea and Caerya species.
