= Marbla divisa =

Scientific classification
- Kingdom: Animalia
- Phylum: Arthropoda
- Class: Insecta
- Order: Lepidoptera
- Superfamily: Noctuoidea
- Family: Erebidae
- Genus: Marbla
- Species: M. divisa

Binomial name
- Marbla divisa (Walker, 1855)

Synonyms
- Eloria divisa Walker, 1855; Hylemera tenera (Holland, 1893)

Species of moth

Marbla divisa is a moth of the family Erebidae first described by Francis Walker in 1855. It is found in subtropical Africa and is known from the Democratic Republic of the Congo, Nigeria, Madagascar, Gabon, Sierra Leone, Equatorial Guinea and Zambia.

Its wingspan is around 38–40 mm.
