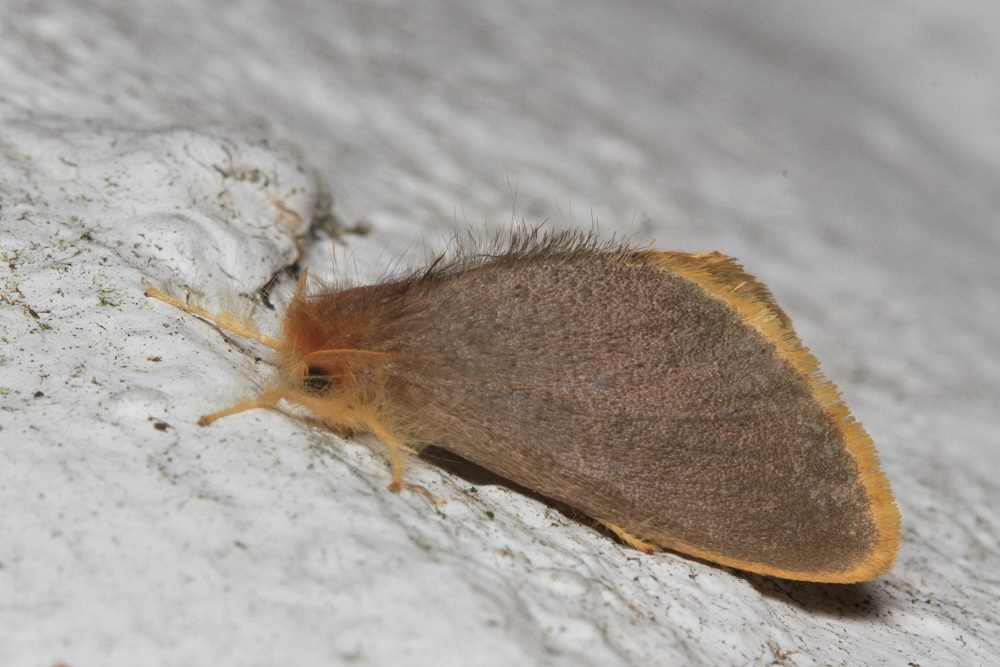
- B. albinotata

Scientific classification
- Kingdom: Animalia
- Phylum: Arthropoda
- Clade: Pancrustacea
- Class: Insecta
- Order: Lepidoptera
- Superfamily: Noctuoidea
- Family: Erebidae
- Subfamily: Lymantriinae
- Tribe: Nygmiini
- Genus: Bembina; Walker, 1865

Type species
- Bembina apicalis Walker, 1865

= Bembina =

Genus of moths

Bembina is a genus of tussock moths in the family Erebidae.

Walker circumscribed the genus in 1865 with his newly-described B. apicalis as its sole member.

== Species ==
As of 2017, the following six species are included in the genus.

- Bembina albinotata (Heylaerts, 1892)
- Bembina apicalis Walker, 1865
- Bembina atripuncta (Hampson, 1897)
- Bembina isabellina (Hampson, 1892)
- Bembina nucula (Swinhoe, 1894)
- Bembina pseudaurantiaca Holloway, 1999
