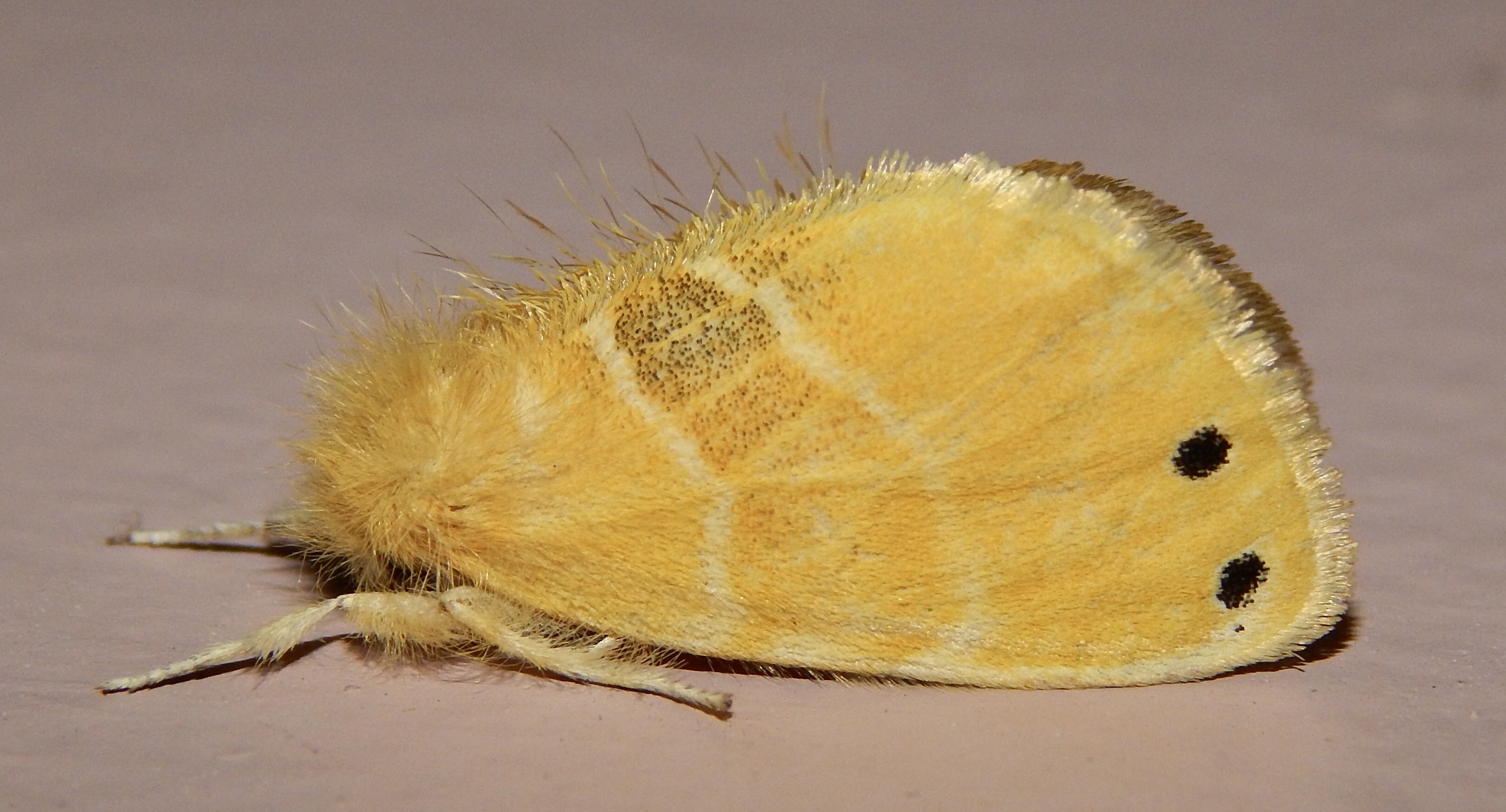
- Artaxa guttata

Scientific classification
- Kingdom: Animalia
- Phylum: Arthropoda
- Clade: Pancrustacea
- Class: Insecta
- Order: Lepidoptera
- Superfamily: Noctuoidea
- Family: Erebidae
- Genus: Artaxa
- Species: A. guttata

Binomial name
- Artaxa guttata Walker, 1855

Synonyms
- Nygmia flava Swinhoe, 1923; Euproctis guttata Collenette, 1934

= Artaxa guttata =

Species of moth

Artaxa guttata is a moth of the family Erebidae first described by Francis Walker in 1855. It is found in Bangladesh, Sri Lanka, and India.

The caterpillar is considered a minor pest that attacks many plants such as Ricinus communis, Jasminum, Lantana camara, Mangifera indica, rose, Citrus, Terminalia myriocarpa, Terminalia tomentosa, Cajanus cajan, Ziziphus mauritiana, Shorea robusta, Maesa lanceolata, Mallotus philippensis, Anogeissus acuminata, Barringtonia acutangula, Carissa carandas and Lagerstroemia indica.
