= Arna micronides =

Scientific classification
- Domain: Eukaryota
- Kingdom: Animalia
- Phylum: Arthropoda
- Class: Insecta
- Order: Lepidoptera
- Superfamily: Noctuoidea
- Family: Erebidae
- Genus: Arna
- Species: A. micronides

Binomial name
- Arna micronides Eecke van, 1928

Species of moth

Arna micronides is a species of moth in the family Erebidae. It is a pest of millets in India.
