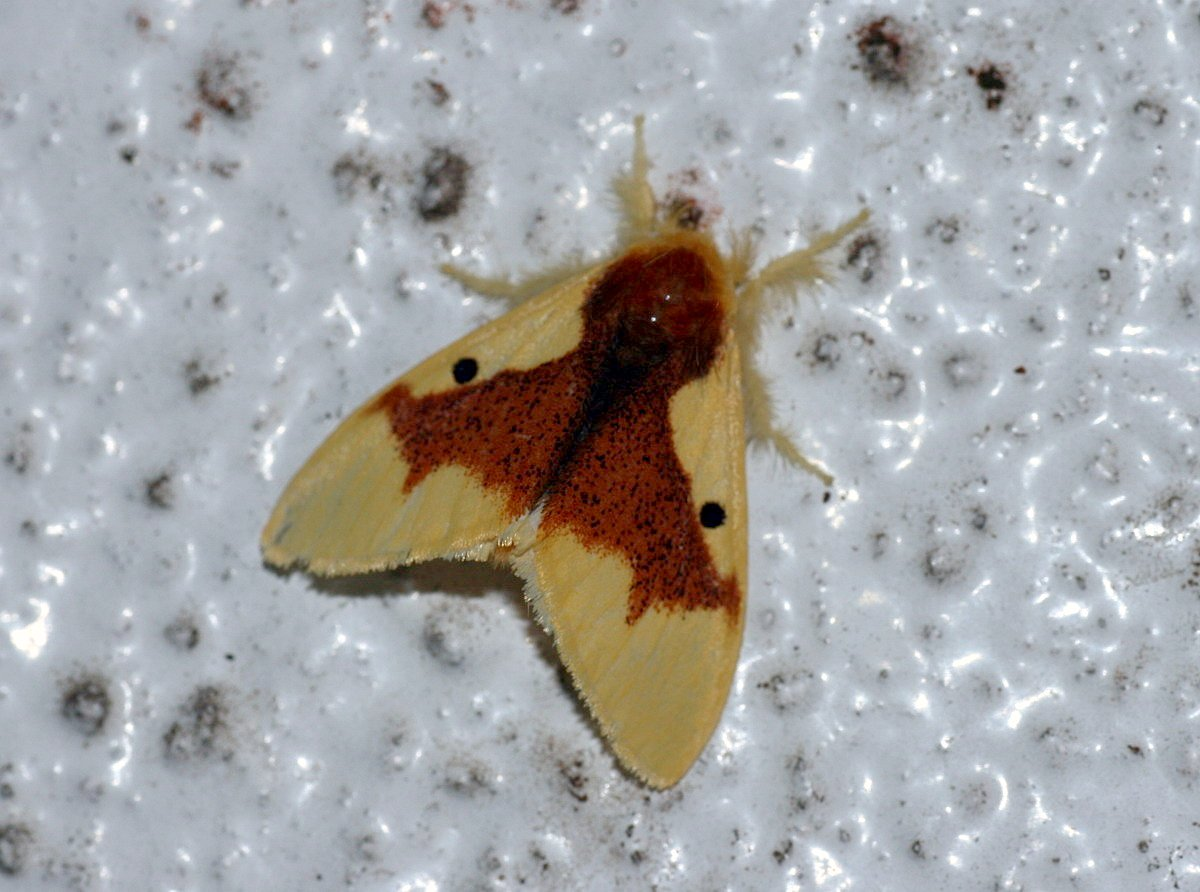

Scientific classification
- Domain: Eukaryota
- Kingdom: Animalia
- Phylum: Arthropoda
- Class: Insecta
- Order: Lepidoptera
- Superfamily: Noctuoidea
- Family: Erebidae
- Genus: Nygmia
- Species: N. solitaria

Binomial name
- Nygmia solitaria (van Eecke, 1928)

Synonyms
- Euproctis solitaria van Eecke, 1928; Euproctis walshae Collenette, 1951

= Nygmia solitaria =

Species of moth

Nygmia solitaria is a moth of the family Erebidae. It is found in Sumatra, Peninsular Malaysia and Borneo.

Larvae have been reared on Dendropthoe pentandra.
