= Lacida costalis =

Scientific classification
- Kingdom: Animalia
- Phylum: Arthropoda
- Class: Insecta
- Order: Lepidoptera
- Superfamily: Noctuoidea
- Family: Erebidae
- Genus: Lacida
- Species: L. costalis

Binomial name
- Lacida costalis (Walker, 1855)

Synonyms
- Antipha costalis Walker, 1855; Rilia (?) illepida Walker, 1865; Nygmia costalis Swinhoe, 1923

Species of moth

Lacida costalis is a moth of the family Erebidae first described by Francis Walker in 1855. It is found in Sri Lanka.

Adult has greyish, deeply rounded forewings with angled fasciae and black marginal spots. These spots are irregular in size.
