= Nygmia xanthomela =

Scientific classification
- Kingdom: Animalia
- Phylum: Arthropoda
- Class: Insecta
- Order: Lepidoptera
- Superfamily: Noctuoidea
- Family: Erebidae
- Genus: Nygmia
- Species: N. xanthomela

Binomial name
- Nygmia xanthomela (Walker, 1862)

Synonyms
- Euproctis xanthomela Walker, 1862; Euproctis atomaria Walker, 1855; Euproctis catala Swinhoe, 1902; Euproctis catala postlutosa Holloway, 1982; Euproctis plana Walker sensu Schintlmeister, 1994

Species of moth

Nygmia xanthomela is a moth of the family Erebidae first described by Francis Walker in 1862. It is found in Sri Lanka, Borneo, Java, Sumatra and Peninsular Malaysia.

== Description ==
Forewings are orange yellow with a darker scaly suffusion. The caterpillar is dark brownish grey with a broad grey dorsal band. Head yellowish. The caterpillar is known to feed on Dioscorea, Annona, Tamarindus, Citrus, Loranthus, Theobroma cacao, Lagerstroemia indica, Camellia sinensis and Eriobotrya japonica.

== Subspecies ==
Three subspecies are recognized.

- Nygmia xanthomela catala (Holloway, 1982) - Java, Sumatra
- Nygmia xanthomela postlutosa (Swinhoe, 1903) - Peninsular Malaysia
- Nygmia xanthomela xanthomela - India, Sri Lanka
