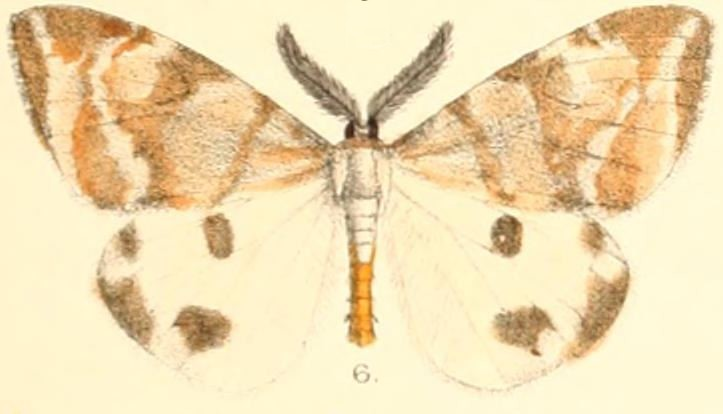

Scientific classification
- Kingdom: Animalia
- Phylum: Arthropoda
- Class: Insecta
- Order: Lepidoptera
- Superfamily: Noctuoidea
- Family: Erebidae
- Genus: Mahoba
- Species: M. plagidotata

Binomial name
- Mahoba plagidotata (Walker, [1863])

Synonyms
- Cyclidia plagidotata Walker, [1863]; Mardara plagidotata

= Mahoba plagidotata =

Species of moth

Mahoba plagidotata is a moth of the subfamily Lymantriinae first described by Francis Walker in 1863. It is found in the region of Bengal in what was then British India.
