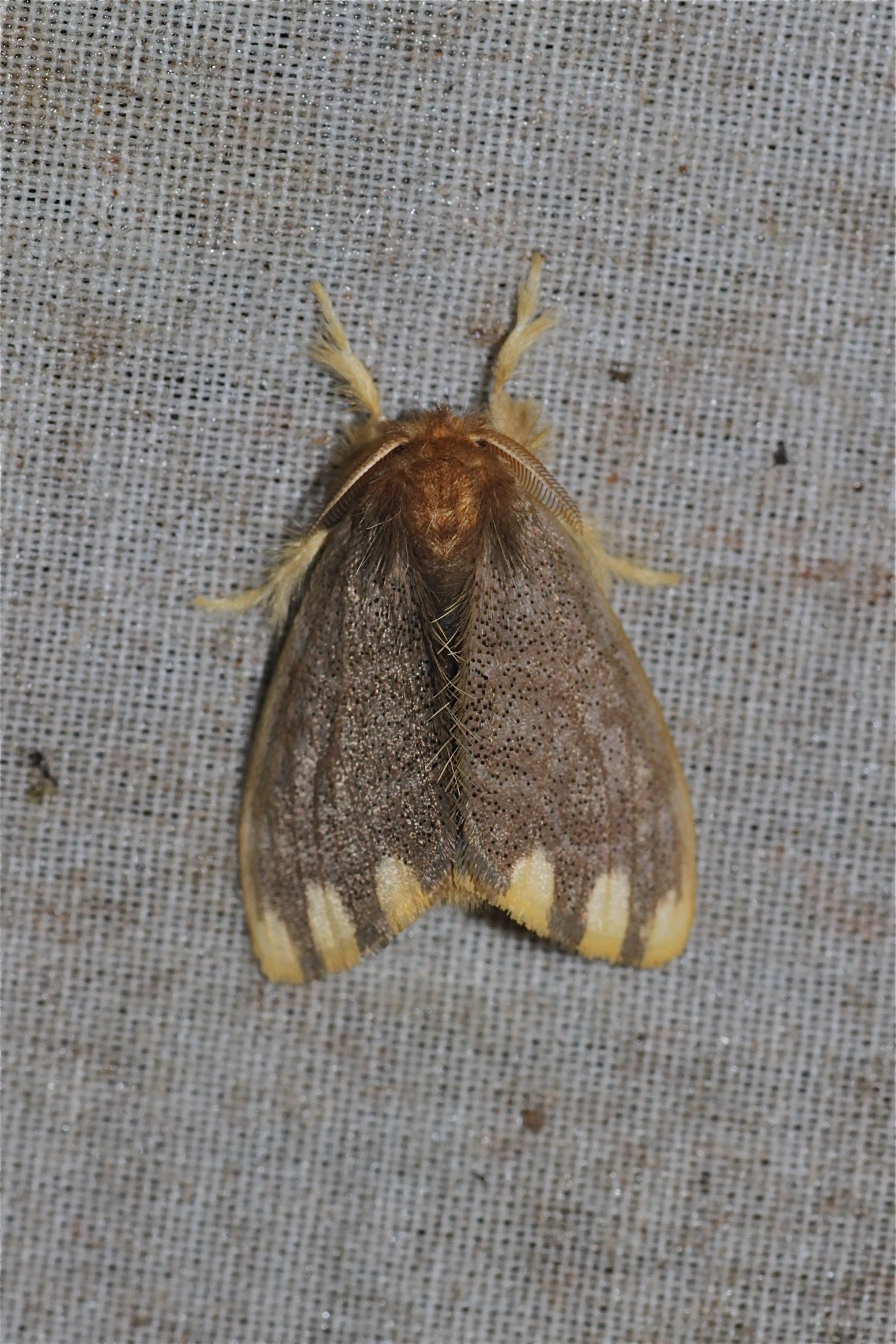
- Orvasca subnotata

Scientific classification
- Kingdom: Animalia
- Phylum: Arthropoda
- Class: Insecta
- Order: Lepidoptera
- Superfamily: Noctuoidea
- Family: Erebidae
- Tribe: Nygmiini
- Genus: Orvasca; Walker, 1865

Synonyms
- Chionophasma Butler, 1886; Ocybola Turner, 1912

= Orvasca =

Genus of moths

Orvasca is a genus of tussock moths in the family Erebidae. The genus was erected by Francis Walker in 1865.

== Species ==
The following species are included in the genus:

- Orvasca aliena Butler, 1886
- Orvasca ashleyi Holloway, 1999
- Orvasca aurantiaca Hampson, 1893
- Orvasca bicolor Heylaerts, 1892
- Orvasca brunneva Holloway, 1999
- Orvasca dimorphissima Holloway, 1994
- Orvasca dolichocera Collenette, 1938
- Orvasca eva Schintlmeister, 1994
- Orvasca flavocinerea van Eecke, 1928
- Orvasca fulvonigra Swinhoe, 1903
- Orvasca kilanas Holloway, 1999
- Orvasca lavella Bethune-Baker, 1910
- Orvasca limbata Butler, 1881
- Orvasca panabra Turner, 1902
- Orvasca paradoxa Butler, 1886
- Orvasca primula Holloway, 1999
- Orvasca rufalba Holloway, 1976
- Orvasca sciasticta Collenette, 1938
- Orvasca semifusca Walker, 1869
- Orvasca subnotata Walker, 1865
- Orvasca vespertilionis Holloway, 1976
- Orvasca waterstradti Holloway, 1976
