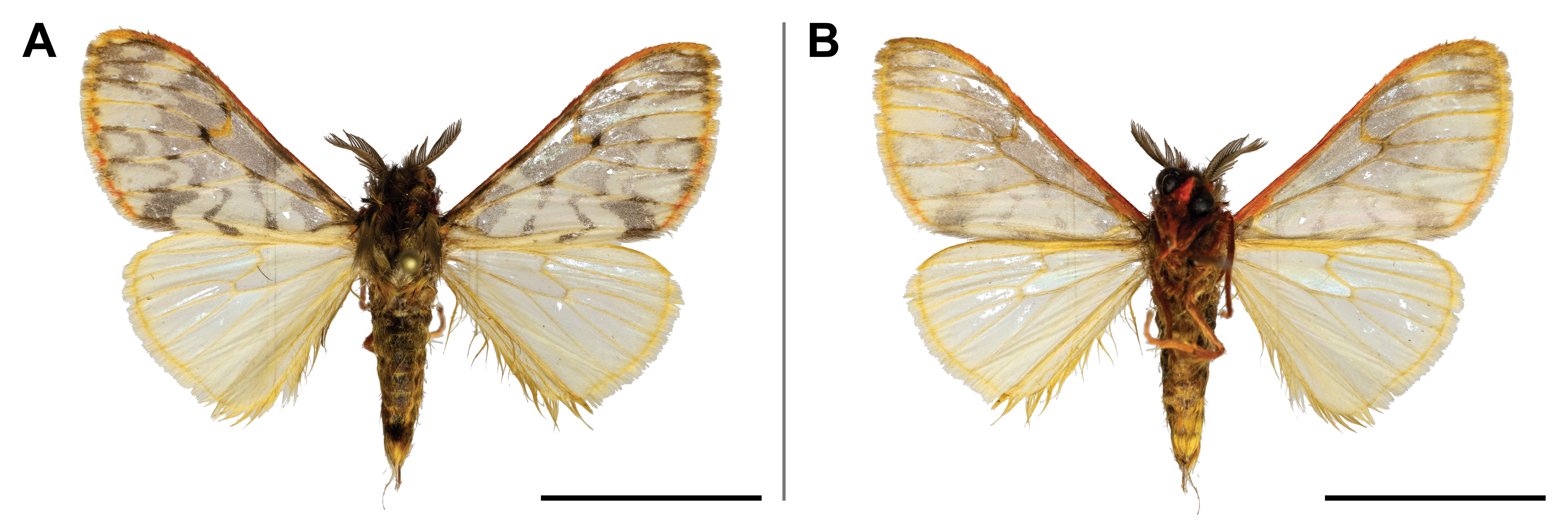

Scientific classification
- Domain: Eukaryota
- Kingdom: Animalia
- Phylum: Arthropoda
- Class: Insecta
- Order: Lepidoptera
- Superfamily: Noctuoidea
- Family: Erebidae
- Genus: Rhypopteryx
- Species: R. rubripunctata

Binomial name
- Rhypopteryx rubripunctata (Weymer, 1892)

Synonyms
- Psilura rubripunctata Weymer, 1892

= Rhypopteryx rubripunctata =

Species of moth

Rhypopteryx rubripunctata is a species of moth of the subfamily Lymantriinae first described by Gustav Weymer in 1892. It is known from the Democratic Republic of the Congo, South Africa and Tanzania.

This species has a body length of 19 mm, the length of the forewings is 25 mm. The forewings are pale brown with a row of white spots near the costa.
