= Artaxa drucei =

Scientific classification
- Domain: Eukaryota
- Kingdom: Animalia
- Phylum: Arthropoda
- Class: Insecta
- Order: Lepidoptera
- Superfamily: Noctuoidea
- Family: Erebidae
- Genus: Artaxa
- Species: A. drucei

Binomial name
- Artaxa drucei

Species of moth

Artaxa drucei is a species of moth in the genus Artaxa found in Papua New Guinea. There are 13 collected specimens, all at the Smithsonian Institution's National Museum of Natural History.
