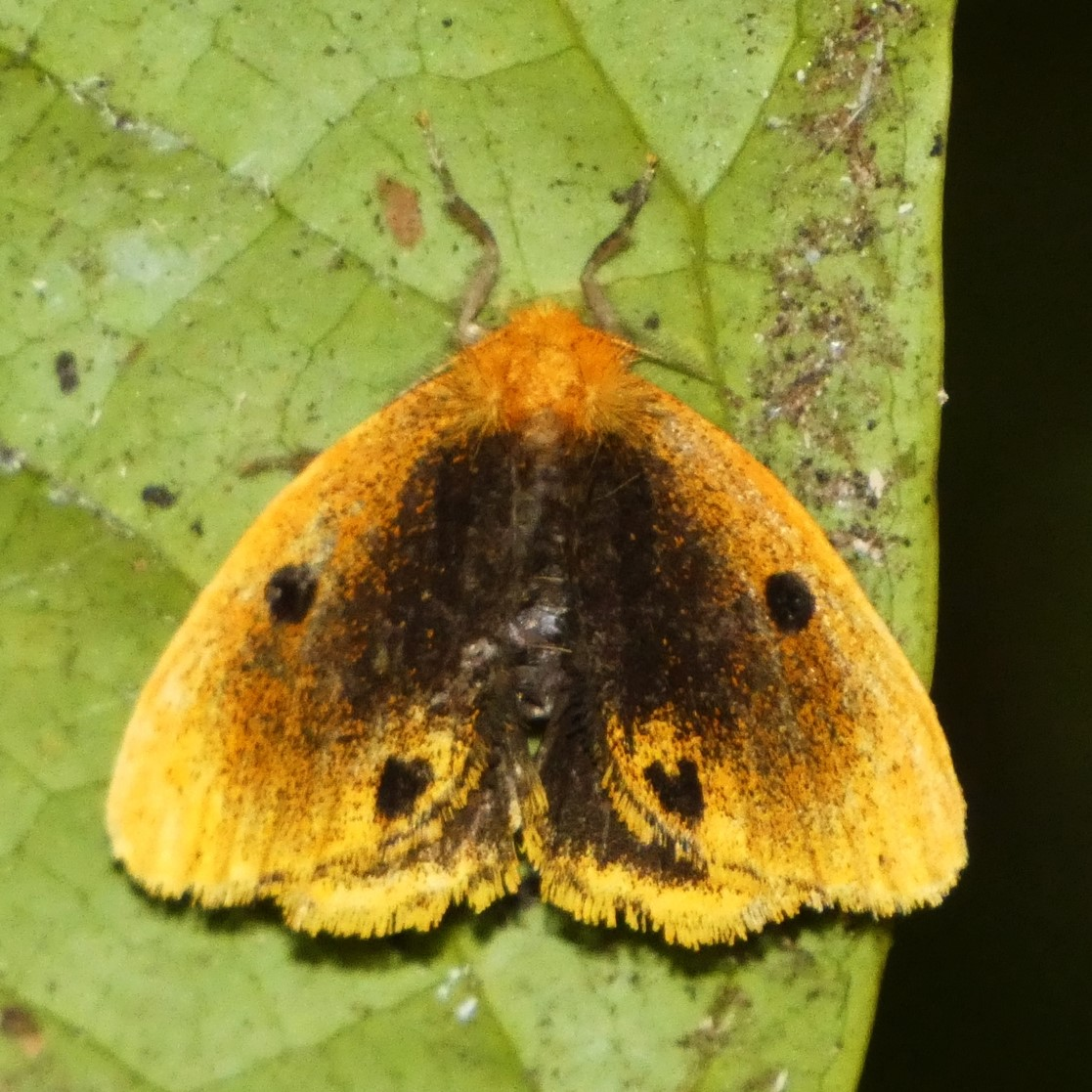
- Sundaroa calesia

Scientific classification
- Kingdom: Animalia
- Phylum: Arthropoda
- Clade: Pancrustacea
- Class: Insecta
- Order: Lepidoptera
- Superfamily: Noctuoidea
- Family: Erebidae
- Tribe: Nygmiini
- Genus: Sundaroa; Holloway, 1999

= Sundaroa =

Genus of moths

Sundaroa is a genus of tussock moths in the family Erebidae. The genus was erected by Jeremy Daniel Holloway in 1999.

== Species ==
The following species are included in the genus:

- Sundaroa calesia Swinhoe, 1902
- Sundaroa celaenostola Collenette, 1932
- Sundaroa cheyi Holloway, 1999
- Sundaroa flaveofusca Swinhoe, 1902
- Sundaroa mirma Swinhoe, 1903
- Sundaroa sexmacula Swinhoe, 1903
- Sundaroa transflava Holloway, 1976
