= Nygmia amplior =

Scientific classification
- Domain: Eukaryota
- Kingdom: Animalia
- Phylum: Arthropoda
- Class: Insecta
- Order: Lepidoptera
- Superfamily: Noctuoidea
- Family: Erebidae
- Genus: Nygmia
- Species: N. amplior

Binomial name
- Nygmia amplior (Collenette, 1930)

Species of moth

Nygmia amplior is a species of moth in the family Erebidae. It is a pest of millets in India.
