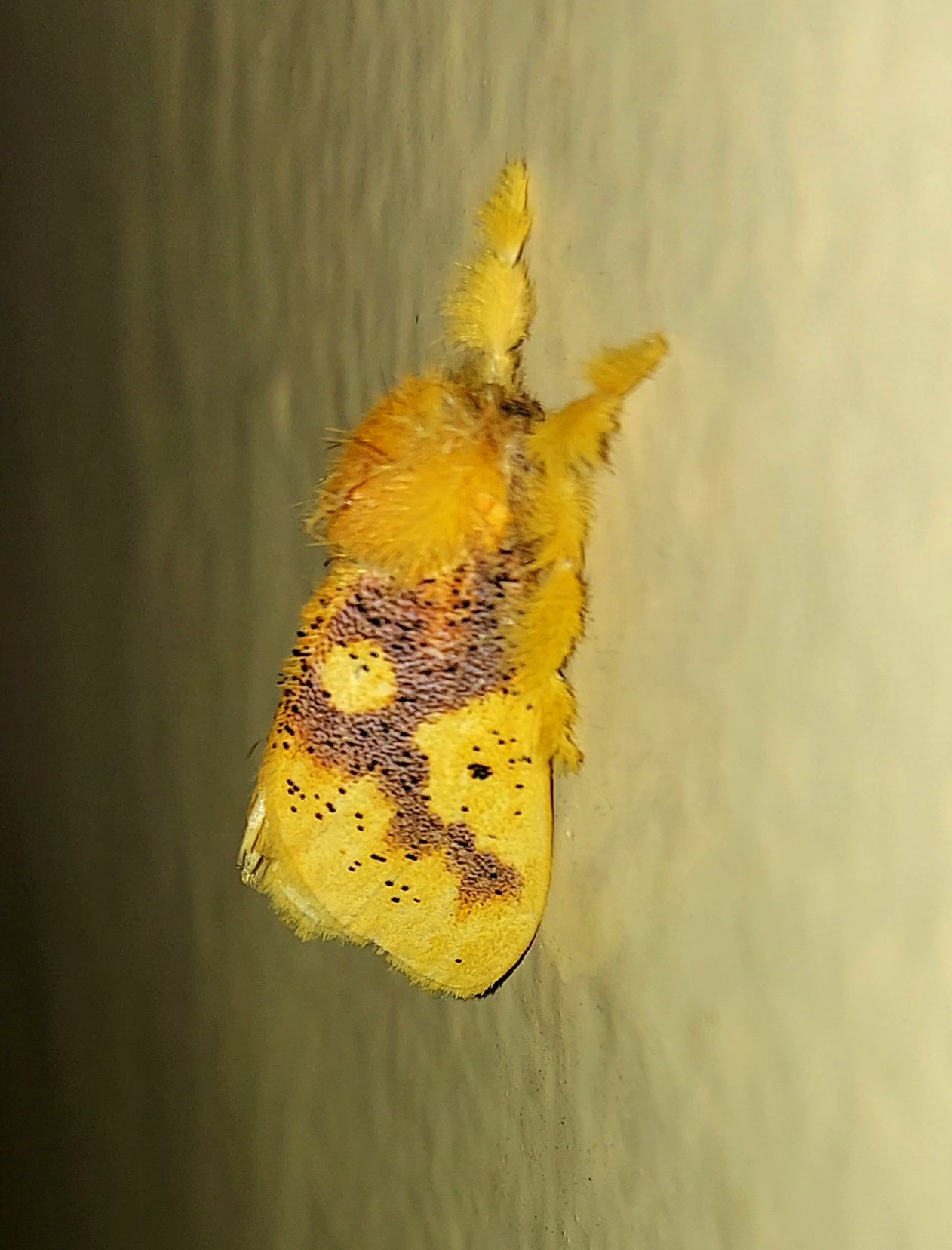
- in Sri Lanka

Scientific classification
- Kingdom: Animalia
- Phylum: Arthropoda
- Class: Insecta
- Order: Lepidoptera
- Superfamily: Noctuoidea
- Family: Erebidae
- Genus: Nygmia
- Species: N. icilia

Binomial name
- Nygmia icilia (Stoll, 1790)

Synonyms
- Phalaena icilia Stoll, [1790]; Choerotricha decussata Moore, 1877

= Nygmia icilia =

Species of moth

Nygmia icilia is a moth of the family Erebidae first described by Caspar Stoll in 1790. It is found in India and Sri Lanka.

== Description ==
The wingspan of the female is about 38 mm. Antennae are bipectinate (comb like on both sides). Forewings are bright orange yellow and covered with slightly powdered black scales. The head, thorax and abdomen are hairy. Anal tufts are orange yellow. A rusty coloured band runs from near the base of the forewing. A black spot is present at the end of the cell. There are long black hairs on the inner margin. the palpi are porrect (extending forward) and reach beyond the frons. The hindwing and cilia are pale orange yellow. The caterpillar is dull black with yellow longitudinal bands and is marbled with brown. The ventral side is jet black. Pupation occurs within a woven, silken cocoon. The caterpillar is known to feed on Dendrophthoe glabrescens, Loranthus and Mallotus paniculatus.
