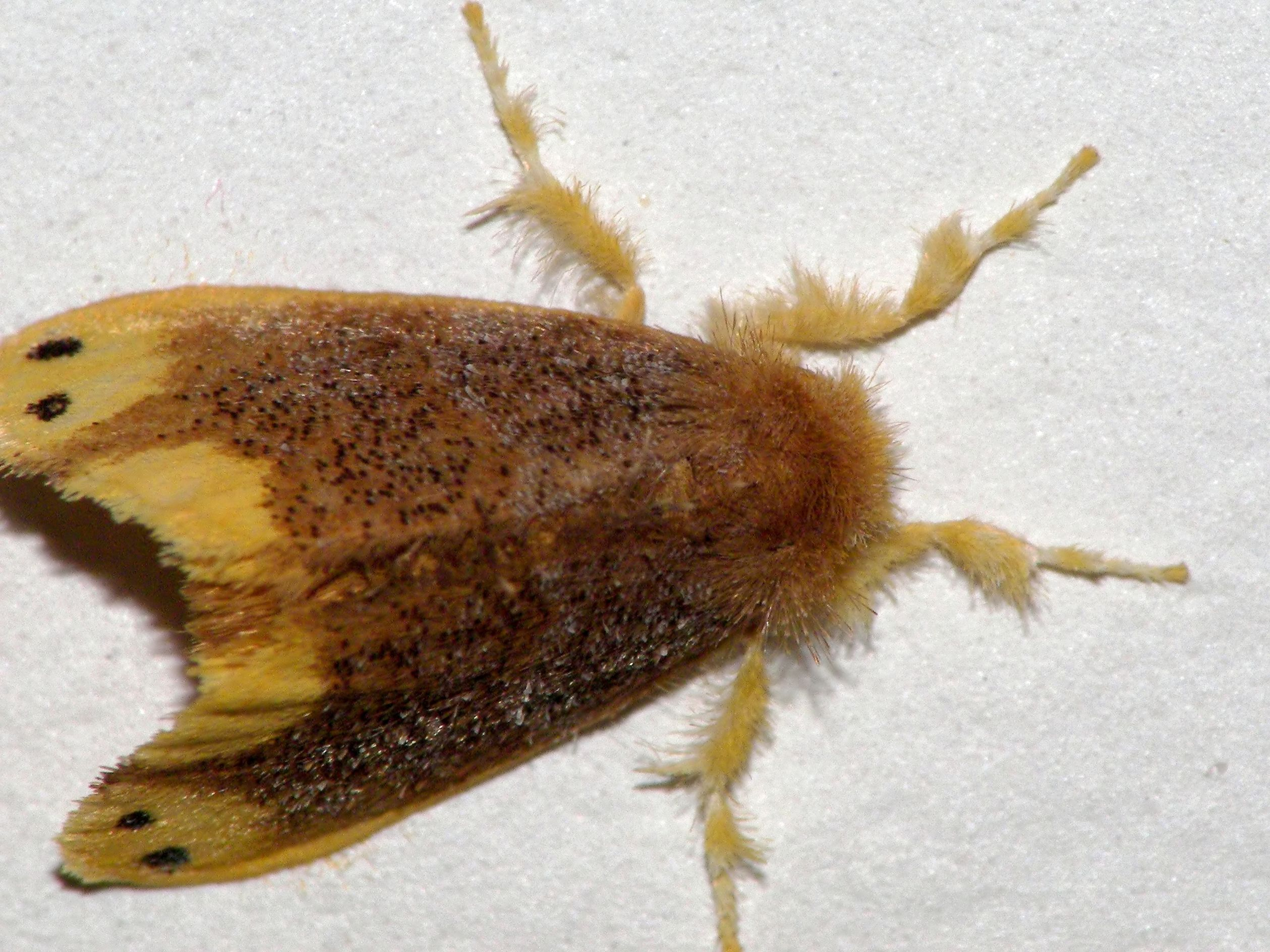
- Arna bipunctapex

Scientific classification
- Kingdom: Animalia
- Phylum: Arthropoda
- Clade: Pancrustacea
- Class: Insecta
- Order: Lepidoptera
- Superfamily: Noctuoidea
- Family: Erebidae
- Subfamily: Lymantriinae
- Tribe: Nygmiini
- Genus: Arna; Walker, 1855

= Arna (moth) =

Genus of moths

Arna is a genus of tussock moths in the family Erebidae. The genus was erected by Francis Walker in 1855. It contains many species formerly included in the genus Euproctis, such as Arna bipunctapex.

== Species ==
The following species are included in the genus.

- Arna apicalis Walker, 1865
- Arna atomarina van, Eecke 1928
- Arna bipunctapex Hampson, 1891
- Arna erema Collenette, 1932
- Arna flavolimbatulana Strand, 1918
- Arna mesilauensis Holloway, 1976
- Arna micronides van, Eecke 1928
- Arna minutissima Swinhoe, 1903
- Arna perplexa Swinhoe, 1903
- Arna phaulida Collenette, 1938
- Arna pseudoconspersa
- Arna schistocarpa Collenette, 1949
