= Argyrostagma =

Scientific classification
- Domain: Eukaryota
- Kingdom: Animalia
- Phylum: Arthropoda
- Class: Insecta
- Order: Lepidoptera
- Superfamily: Noctuoidea
- Family: Erebidae
- Tribe: Lymantriini
- Genus: Argyrostagma; Aurivillius, 1904

Genus of moths

Argyrostagma is a genus of moths in the subfamily Lymantriinae. The genus was erected by Per Olof Christopher Aurivillius in 1904.

== Species ==
- Argyrostagma niobe (Weymer, 1896) Tanzania
- Argyrostagma thomsoni (H. Druce, 1898) western Africa
