= Aphomoeoma =

Scientific classification
- Domain: Eukaryota
- Kingdom: Animalia
- Phylum: Arthropoda
- Class: Insecta
- Order: Lepidoptera
- Superfamily: Noctuoidea
- Family: Erebidae
- Tribe: Lymantriini
- Genus: Aphomoeoma; Collenette, 1959
- Species: A. mesembrinum

Binomial name
- Aphomoeoma mesembrinum Collenette, 1959

Genus of moths

Aphomoeoma is a monotypic moth genus in the subfamily Lymantriinae. Its only species, Aphomoeoma mesembrinum, is found on Madagascar. Both the genus and the species were first described by Cyril Leslie Collenette in 1959.
