= Micraroa =

Scientific classification
- Kingdom: Animalia
- Phylum: Arthropoda
- Class: Insecta
- Order: Lepidoptera
- Superfamily: Noctuoidea
- Family: Erebidae
- Tribe: Lymantriini
- Genus: Micraroa; Hampson, 1905

Genus of moths

Micraroa is a genus of moths in the subfamily Lymantriinae. The genus was erected by George Hampson in 1905. Both species are found in southern Africa.

== Species ==
- Micraroa minima Janse, 1915
- Micraroa rufescens Hampson, 1905
