= Abakabaka =

Scientific classification
- Kingdom: Animalia
- Phylum: Arthropoda
- Class: Insecta
- Order: Lepidoptera
- Superfamily: Noctuoidea
- Family: Erebidae
- Subfamily: Lymantriinae
- Genus: Abakabaka; Griveaud, 1976

Genus of erebid moths

Abakabaka is a genus of erebid moths in the subfamily Lymantriinae. Both species are known from Madagascar.

== Species ==
- Abakabaka fuliginosa Saalmüller 1884
- Abakabaka phasiana (Butler, 1882)
