= Radamaria =

Scientific classification
- Domain: Eukaryota
- Kingdom: Animalia
- Phylum: Arthropoda
- Class: Insecta
- Order: Lepidoptera
- Superfamily: Noctuoidea
- Family: Erebidae
- Tribe: Lymantriini
- Genus: Radamaria; Griveaud, 1976

Genus of moths

Radamaria is a genus of moths in the subfamily Lymantriinae. The genus was erected by Paul Griveaud in 1976.

== Species ==
- Radamaria miselioides (Kenrick, 1914)
- Radamaria salvatgei Griveaud, 1977
- Radamaria vadoni Griveaud, 1977
- Radamaria zena (Hering, 1926)
