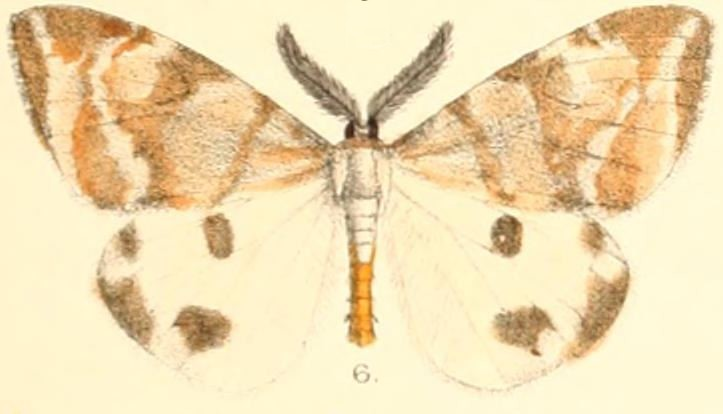
- Mahoba plagidotata

Scientific classification
- Kingdom: Animalia
- Phylum: Arthropoda
- Class: Insecta
- Order: Lepidoptera
- Superfamily: Noctuoidea
- Family: Erebidae
- Subfamily: Lymantriinae
- Genus: Mahoba; Moore, 1879

Type species
- Cyclidia plagidotata Walker, 1862

Synonyms
- Mardara Swinhoe, 1923

= Mahoba (moth) =

Genus of moths

Mahoba is a genus of moths in the subfamily Lymantriinae. The genus was erected by Frederic Moore in 1879.

== Species ==
- Mahoba plagidotata Walker, 1862
- Mahoba irrorata Moore, 1879
