= Marbla =

Scientific classification
- Domain: Eukaryota
- Kingdom: Animalia
- Phylum: Arthropoda
- Class: Insecta
- Order: Lepidoptera
- Superfamily: Noctuoidea
- Family: Erebidae
- Tribe: Lymantriini
- Genus: Marbla; C. Swinhoe, 1903

Synonyms
- Marbloides Hering, 1926

Genus of moths

Marbla is a genus of moths in the subfamily Lymantriinae. The genus was erected by Charles Swinhoe in 1903.

== Species ==
- Marbla affinis (Hering, 1926) southern Nigeria
- Marbla haplora Collenette, 1954 Uganda
- Marbla divisa (Walker, 1855) western Africa
- Marbla paradoxa (Hering, 1926) western Africa
