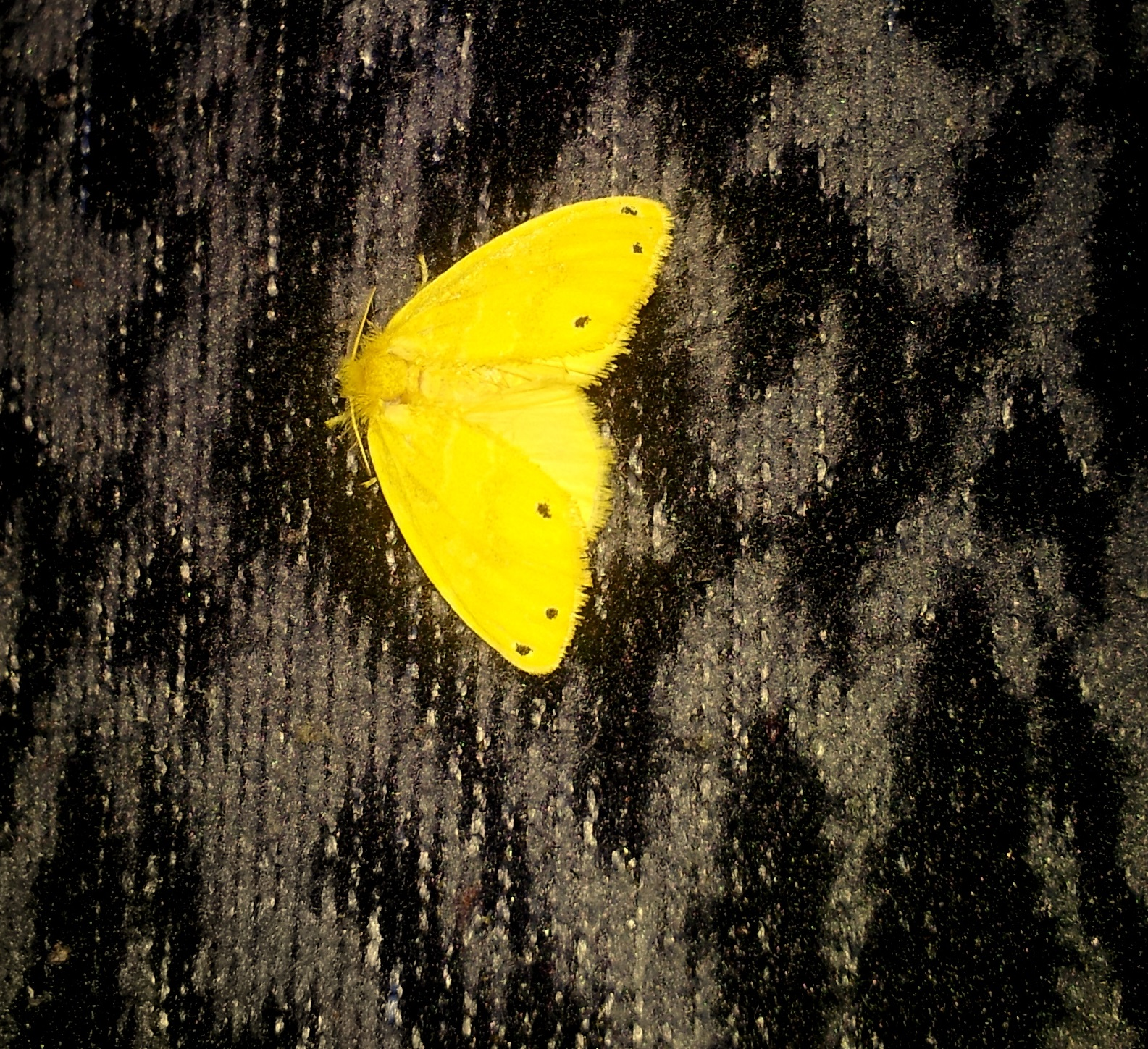
- Artaxa sp. in Sri Lanka

Scientific classification
- Kingdom: Animalia
- Phylum: Arthropoda
- Clade: Pancrustacea
- Class: Insecta
- Order: Lepidoptera
- Superfamily: Noctuoidea
- Family: Erebidae
- Subfamily: Lymantriinae
- Tribe: Nygmiini
- Genus: Artaxa; Walker, 1855

Synonyms
- Themaca Walker, 1865

= Artaxa =

Genus of moths

Artaxa is a genus of tussock moths in the family Erebidae erected by Francis Walker in 1855. Some of the species have urticating hairs.

== Species ==
- Artaxa angulata (Matsumura, 1927)
- Artaxa cina (Strand, 1915) (Borneo)
- Artaxa comparata (Walker, 1865) (India, Sri Lanka)
- Artaxa digramma (Boisduval, 1844) (India, Sri Lanka, Myanmar, Java)
- Artaxa distracta Walker, 1865 (Sarawak)
- Artaxa drucei
- Artaxa fulvistriata (Swinhoe, 1903) (Papua New Guinea)
- Artaxa gentia (Swinhoe, 1903) (Borneo)
- Artaxa guttata Walker, 1855 (India, Sri Lanka, Myanmar)
- Artaxa hannemanni (Schintlmeister, 1994) (Borneo, Peninsular Malaysia, Sumatra)
- Artaxa hemixantha (Collenette, 1938) (Borneo)
- Artaxa lunula Bethune-Baker
- Artaxa maza (Swinhoe, 1903) (New Guinea)
- Artaxa montiphaula Holloway, 1999(Borneo, Sarawak)
- Artaxa nubilosa (van Eecke, 1928) (Sumatra)
- Artaxa ormea (Swinhoe, 1903) (Borneo, Sumatra)
- Artaxa pentatoxa (Collenette, 1930) (New Guinea)
- Artaxa phaula (Collenette, 1932) (Malaysia peninsular, Borneo)
- Artaxa rubiginosa (Snellen, 1877) (Java)
- Artaxa sabahensis (Holloway, 1976) (Borneo)
- Artaxa tanaoptera (Collenette, 1938) (Celebes)
- Artaxa tuhana (Holloway, 1976) (Borneo)
- Artaxa vitellina (Kollar, 1848) (India, Sri Lanka)
