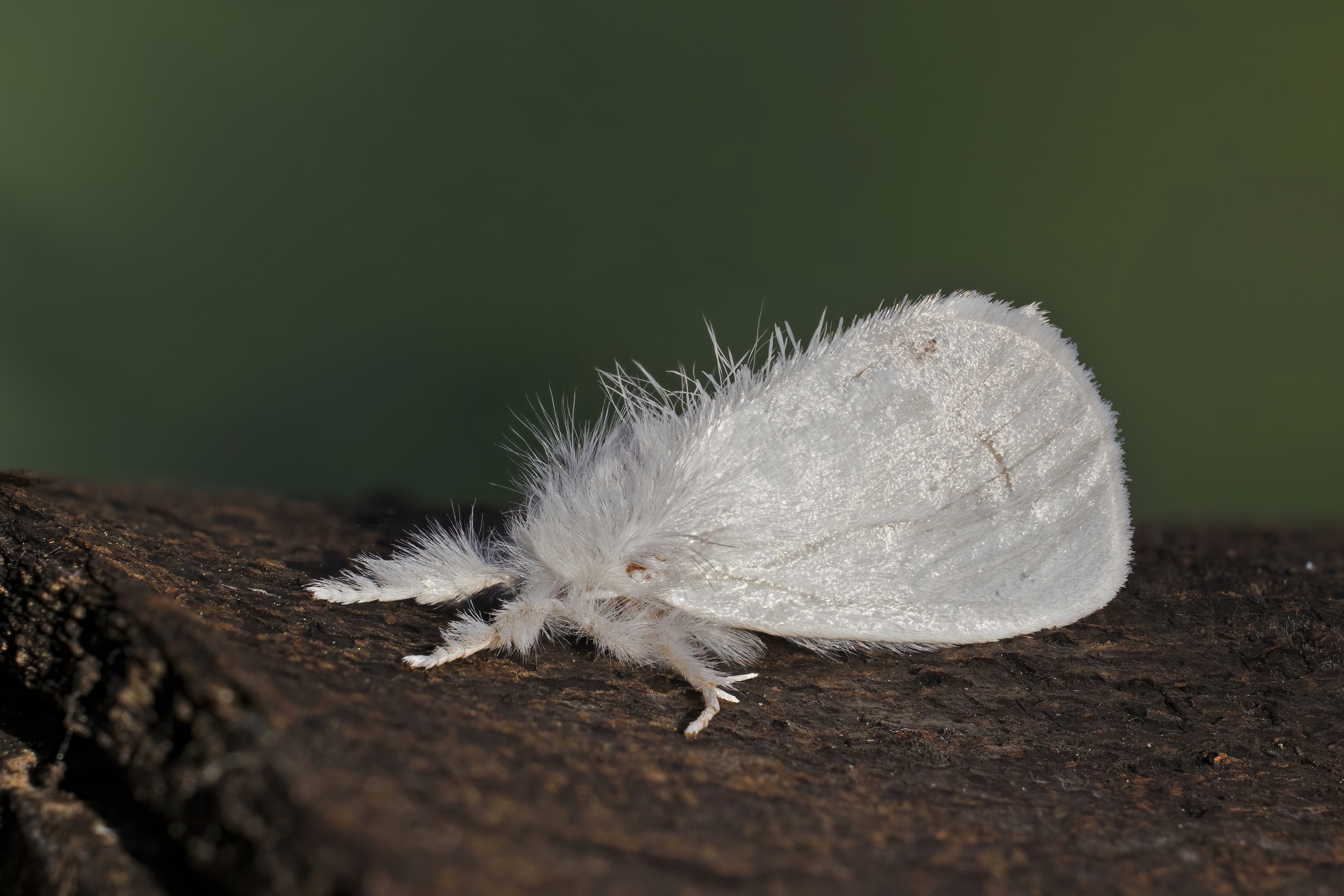
- Euproctis similis

Scientific classification
- Kingdom: Animalia
- Phylum: Arthropoda
- Clade: Pancrustacea
- Class: Insecta
- Order: Lepidoptera
- Superfamily: Noctuoidea
- Family: Erebidae
- Subfamily: Lymantriinae
- Tribe: Nygmiini; Holloway, 1999

= Nygmiini =

Tribe of moths

The Nygmiini are a tribe of tussock moths of the Erebidae family.

== Description ==
Adult females of the tribe have an enlarged seventh abdominal segment with a tuft of scales and use this adaptation to protect their egg mass.

== Genera ==
- Albarracina
- Arna
- Artaxa
- Bembina
- Choerotricha
- Cozola
- Epeuproctis
- Euproctis
- Kidokuga
- Lacida
- Medama
- Micromorphe
- Nygmia
- Orvasca
- Rhypotoses
- Somena
- Sphrageidus
- Sundaroa
- Toxoproctis
