= Abynotha =

Scientific classification
- Domain: Eukaryota
- Kingdom: Animalia
- Phylum: Arthropoda
- Class: Insecta
- Order: Lepidoptera
- Superfamily: Noctuoidea
- Family: Erebidae
- Tribe: Lymantriini
- Genus: Abynotha; C. Swinhoe, 1903

Genus of erebid moths

Abynotha is a genus of erebid moths in the subfamily Lymantriinae. The genus was first described in 1903 by Charles Swinhoe.

== Species ==
The genus consists of the following species:

- Abynotha meinickei Hering, 1926
- Abynotha preussi (Mabille & Vuillot, 1892) - type species (as Liparis preussi).
