= Aruta =

Scientific classification
- Kingdom: Animalia
- Phylum: Arthropoda
- Clade: Pancrustacea
- Class: Insecta
- Order: Lepidoptera
- Superfamily: Noctuoidea
- Family: Erebidae
- Tribe: Lymantriini
- Genus: Aruta; C. Swinhoe, 1922

Synonyms
- Axana C. Swinhoe, 1922

Genus of moths

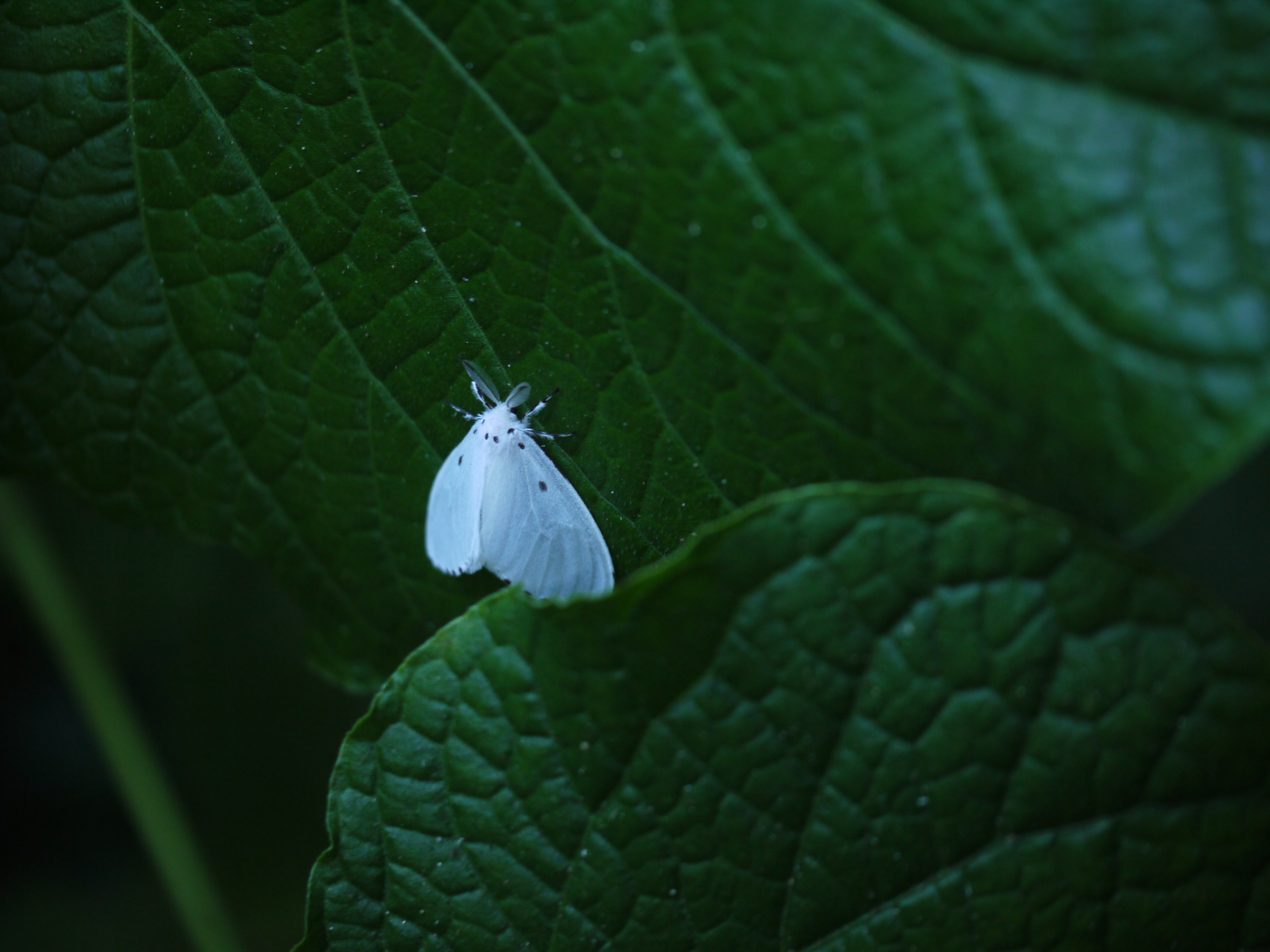
Aruta puncticilia in India

Aruta is a genus of moths in the subfamily Lymantriinae. The genus was erected by Charles Swinhoe in 1922.

== Species ==
- Aruta flavipes (Hampson, [1893]) Sikkim
- Aruta puncticilia (Moore, 1872) Nilgiri Mountains
