= Ankova =

Scientific classification
- Domain: Eukaryota
- Kingdom: Animalia
- Phylum: Arthropoda
- Class: Insecta
- Order: Lepidoptera
- Superfamily: Noctuoidea
- Family: Erebidae
- Tribe: Lymantriini
- Genus: Ankova; Griveaud, 1976

Species
- See text

Genus of moths

Ankova is a genus of moths in the subfamily Lymantriinae.

== Species ==
- Ankova belessichares (Collenette, 1936)
- Ankova lignea (Butler, 1879)
