= Allotoma =

Scientific classification
- Domain: Eukaryota
- Kingdom: Animalia
- Phylum: Arthropoda
- Class: Insecta
- Order: Lepidoptera
- Family: incertae sedis
- Genus: Allotoma; Roepke, 1944
- Species: A. cornifrons

Binomial name
- Allotoma cornifrons Roepke, 1944

Genus of moths

Allotoma is a genus of moths in the superfamily Bombycoidea. The only species in the genus is Allotoma cornifrons, found in Borneo, Malaysia, and Sumatra.

The puzzling genus has been shuffled between the Notodontidae and Lymantriidae families without certainty of its correct classification. Holloway ruled out Noctuoidea and hypothesized that it may belong in the Bombycoidea superfamily without placing it more precisely.
