= Rivotra =

Scientific classification
- Domain: Eukaryota
- Kingdom: Animalia
- Phylum: Arthropoda
- Class: Insecta
- Order: Lepidoptera
- Superfamily: Noctuoidea
- Family: Erebidae
- Tribe: Lymantriini
- Genus: Rivotra; Griveaud, 1976

Genus of moths

Rivotra is a genus of moths in the subfamily Lymantriinae. The genus was erected by Paul Griveaud in 1976.

== Species ==
- Rivotra chalcocrata (Collenette, 1931)
- Rivotra confusa Griveaud, 1977
- Rivotra mantsaroa Griveaud, 1977
- Rivotra perissa (Collenette, 1959)
- Rivotra tsaratanana Griveaud, 1977
- Rivotra viridipicta (Kenrick, 1914)
- Rivotra zonobathra (Collenette, 1936)
