= Microrgyia =

Scientific classification
- Domain: Eukaryota
- Kingdom: Animalia
- Phylum: Arthropoda
- Class: Insecta
- Order: Lepidoptera
- Superfamily: Noctuoidea
- Family: Erebidae
- Tribe: Lymantriini
- Genus: Microrgyia; Felder, 1874
- Species: M. amazonum

Binomial name
- Microrgyia amazonum Felder, 1874

Genus of moths

Microrgyia is a monotypic moth genus in the subfamily Lymantriinae. Its only species, Microrgyia amazonum, is found in the Amazon basin. Both the genus and the species were first described by Felder in 1874.
