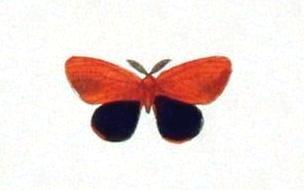
- Micromorphe choerotricha

Scientific classification
- Domain: Eukaryota
- Kingdom: Animalia
- Phylum: Arthropoda
- Class: Insecta
- Order: Lepidoptera
- Superfamily: Noctuoidea
- Family: Erebidae
- Tribe: Nygmiini
- Genus: Micromorphe; Felder, 1874

Synonyms
- Micronygmia Toxopeus, 1948; Xanthonygmia Toxopeus, 1948

= Micromorphe =

Genus of moths

Micromorphe is a genus of tussock moths in the family Erebidae. The genus was erected by Felder in 1874.

== Species ==
- Micromorphe barbarapolonica (Schintlmeister, 1994) Sumatra
- Micromorphe chalcostoma (Collenette, 1932) Peninsular Malaysia, Sumatra, Borneo
- Micromorphe choerotricha Felder, 1874 Moluccas
- Micromorphe hemibathoides (Strand, 1918) Borneo, Sumatra, Peninsular Malaysia
- Micromorphe linta (Moore, [1860]) Sundaland
- Micromorphe oculata (Toxopeus, 1948) Borneo
