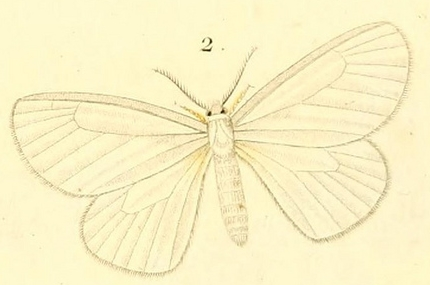
- Marblepsis crocipes

Scientific classification
- Domain: Eukaryota
- Kingdom: Animalia
- Phylum: Arthropoda
- Class: Insecta
- Order: Lepidoptera
- Superfamily: Noctuoidea
- Family: Erebidae
- Subfamily: Lymantriinae
- Genus: Marblepsis; Hering, 1926

Synonyms
- Collenettema Griveaud, 1977

= Marblepsis =

Genus of moths

Marblepsis is a genus of moths in the subfamily Lymantriinae. The genus was described by Hering in 1926.

== Species ==
- Marblepsis chionoptera Collenette, 1936 Madagascar
- Marblepsis costalis (Swinhoe, 1906) Uganda
- Marblepsis crocipes (Boisduval, 1833) Madagascar
- Marblepsis dolosa Hering, 1926 Cameroon
- Marblepsis ephala Collenette, 1956 Madagascar
- Marblepsis flabellaria (Fabricius, 1787) southern Africa
- Marblepsis kakamega Collenette, 1937 Kenya
- Marblepsis kibwezi (Collenette, 1932) Uganda
- Marblepsis lowa Collenette, 1937 Democratic Republic of the Congo
- Marblepsis mayotta (Collenette, 1931) Madagascar
- Marblepsis micca Collenette, 1956 Madagascar
- Marblepsis mona Collenette, 1956 Madagascar
- Marblepsis niveola Hering, 1926 Cameroon
- Marblepsis nyses (Druce, 1887) western Africa
- Marblepsis ochrobasis Collenette, 1938 Madagascar
- Marblepsis pirgula Hering, 1926 western Africa
- Marblepsis semna Collenette, 1959 Madagascar
- Marblepsis tiphia (Swinhoe, 1903) eastern Africa
- Marblepsis umbrata Griveaud, 1973 Madagascar
- Marblepsis xanthoma (Collenette, 1931) Madagascar
