= Masoandro =

Scientific classification
- Domain: Eukaryota
- Kingdom: Animalia
- Phylum: Arthropoda
- Class: Insecta
- Order: Lepidoptera
- Superfamily: Noctuoidea
- Family: Erebidae
- Tribe: Lymantriini
- Genus: Masoandro; Griveaud, 1976
- Species: M. peculiaris

Binomial name
- Masoandro peculiaris (Butler, 1879)

Synonyms
- Mardara peculiaris Butler, 1879

Genus of moths

Masoandro is a monotypic moth genus in the subfamily Lymantriinae erected by Paul Griveaud in 1976. Its only species, Masoandro peculiaris, was first described by Arthur Gardiner Butler in 1879. It is found on Madagascar.
