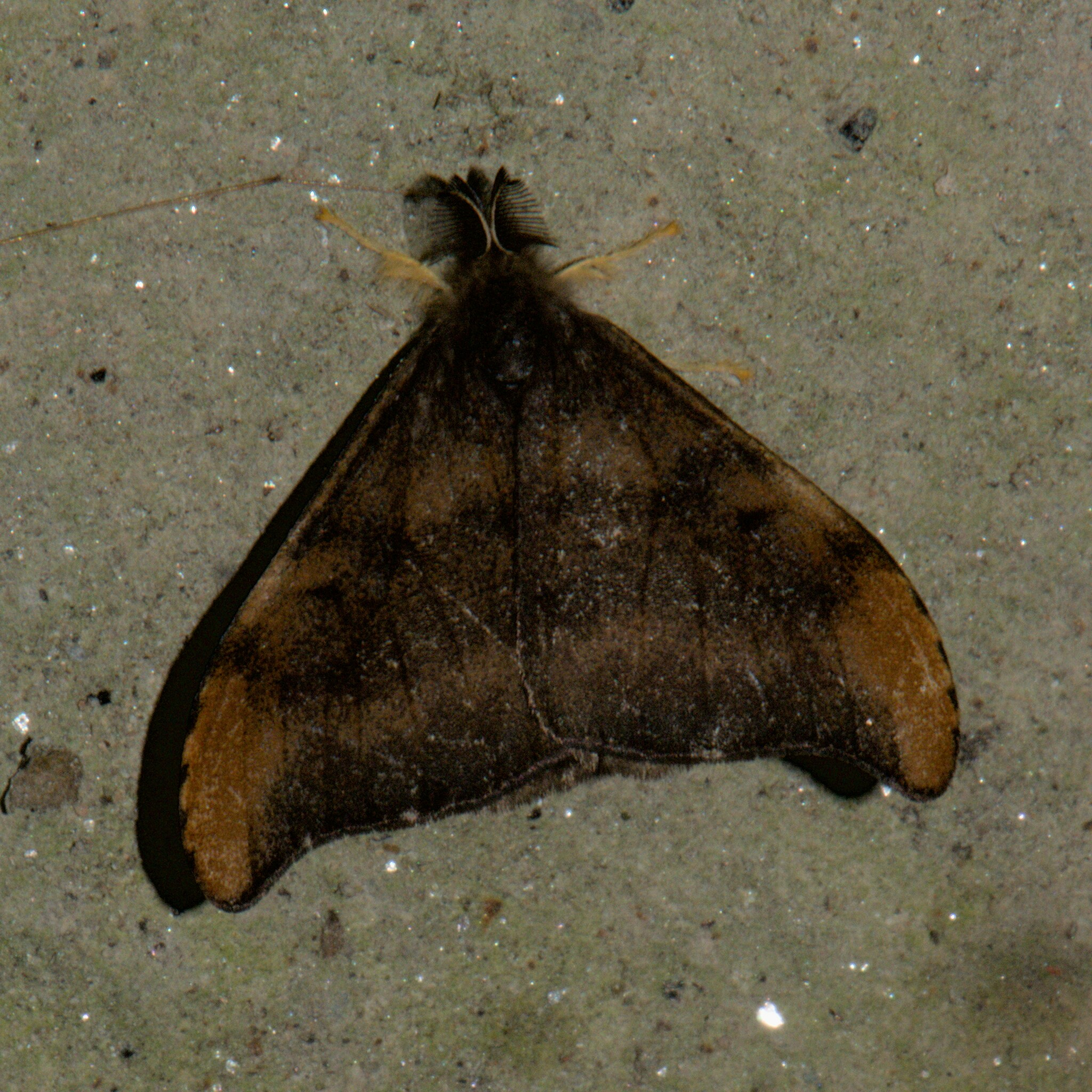
- Rhypotoses drepanioides

Scientific classification
- Kingdom: Animalia
- Phylum: Arthropoda
- Clade: Pancrustacea
- Class: Insecta
- Order: Lepidoptera
- Superfamily: Noctuoidea
- Family: Erebidae
- Tribe: Nygmiini
- Genus: Rhypotoses; Collenette, 1931

= Rhypotoses =

Genus of moths

Rhypotoses is a genus of tussock moths in the family Erebidae. The genus was erected by Cyril Leslie Collenette in 1931.

== Species ==
The following species are included in the genus:

- Rhypotoses adela Collenette, 1932
- Rhypotoses atima Collenette, 1932
- Rhypotoses barlowi Holloway, 1999
- Rhypotoses biformis Holloway, 1976
- Rhypotoses brooksi Collenette, 1953
- Rhypotoses dysbata Collenette, ?
- Rhypotoses glebula C. Swinhoe, 1906
- Rhypotoses humida C. Swinhoe, 1906
- Rhypotoses maculutea Holloway, 1999
- Rhypotoses nigriplaga C. Swinhoe, 1903
- Rhypotoses nigrocrocea Walker, 1862
- Rhypotoses phloeochroa Collenette, 1932
- Rhypotoses ruptata Walker, 1862
- Rhypotoses strigifimbria Walker, 1862
- Rhypotoses triceratops Holloway, 1999
