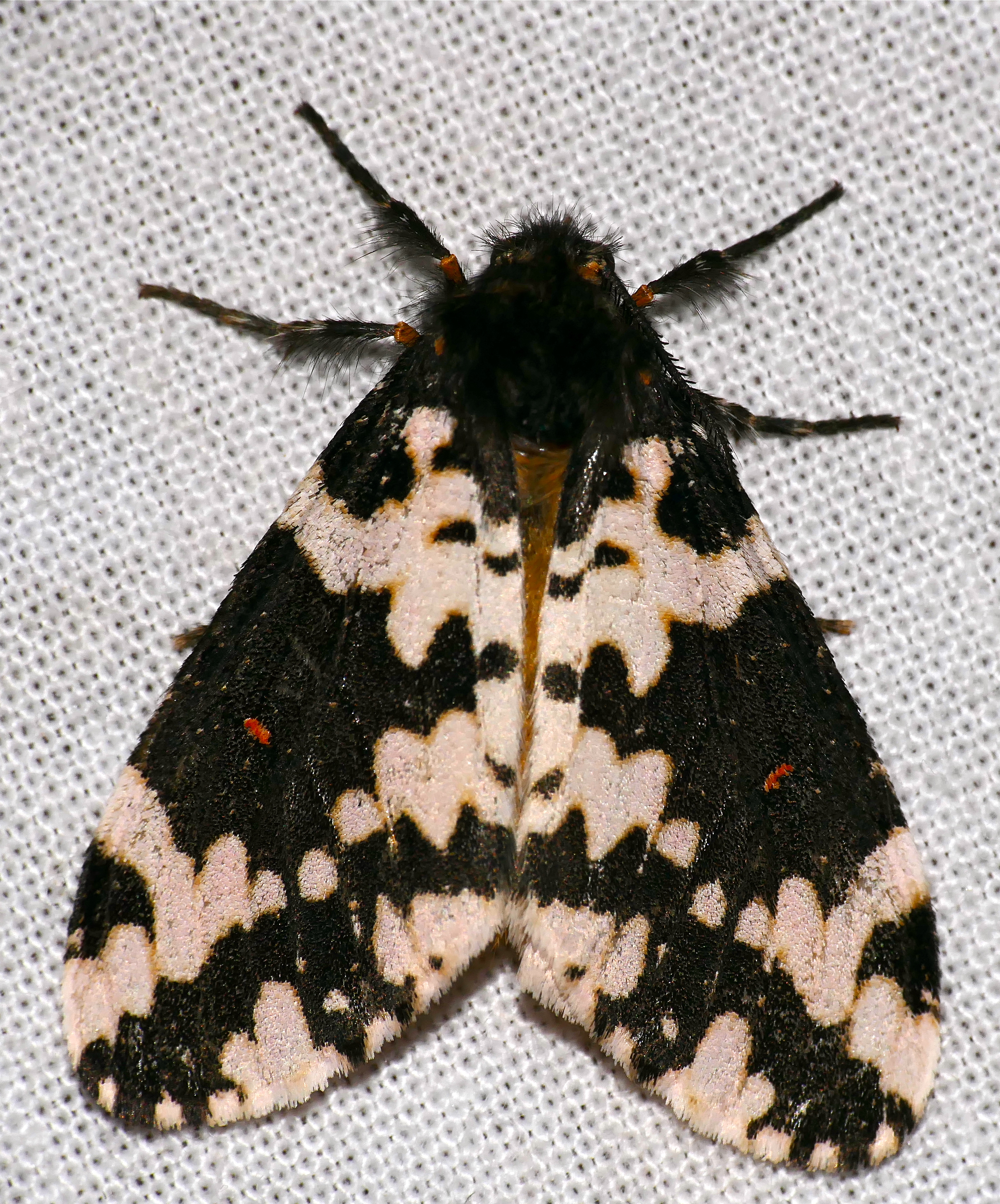
- Rhypopteryx rhodalipha

Scientific classification
- Domain: Eukaryota
- Kingdom: Animalia
- Phylum: Arthropoda
- Class: Insecta
- Order: Lepidoptera
- Superfamily: Noctuoidea
- Family: Erebidae
- Tribe: Lymantriini
- Genus: Rhypopteryx; Aurivillius, 1879

Synonyms
- Rhypopterix Hering, 1927; Aclonophlebia Butler, 1898

= Rhypopteryx =

Genus of moths

Rhypopteryx is a genus of moths in the subfamily Lymantriinae. The genus was erected by Per Olof Christopher Aurivillius in 1879.

== Species ==
Some species of this genus are:

- Rhypopteryx bowdeni Collenette, 1960
- Rhypopteryx camengo Collenette, 1960
- Rhypopteryx capnitis Collenette, 1960
- Rhypopteryx celetica Collenette, 1960
- Rhypopteryx diplogramma Hering, 1927
- Rhypopteryx dracontea (Romieux, 1935)
- Rhypopteryx dracontea (Romieux, 1935)
- Rhypopteryx dysbata Collenette, 1960
- Rhypopteryx fontainei Collenette, 1960
- Rhypopteryx hemichrysa Collenette, 1960
- Rhypopteryx hemiphanta Collenette, 1955
- Rhypopteryx lugardi (C. Swinhoe, 1903)
- Rhypopteryx minor (Collenette, 1938)
- Rhypopteryx pachytaenia (Hering, 1926)
- Rhypopteryx perfragilis Collenette, 1957
- Rhypopteryx phoenicopoda Collenette, 1957
- Rhypopteryx preissi (Schultze, 1934)
- Rhypopteryx psoloconiama Collenette, 1960
- Rhypopteryx psolozona (Collenette, 1938)
- Rhypopteryx romieuxi (Collenette, 1938)
- Rhypopteryx rhodalipha (Felder, 1874)
- Rhypopteryx rhodea (Hampson, 1905)
- Rhypopteryx rhodocloea (Collenette, 1939)
- Rhypopteryx romieuxi (Collenette, 1938)
- Rhypopteryx rubripunctata (Weymer, 1892)
- Rhypopteryx summissa Hering, 1927
- Rhypopteryx sordida Aurivillius, 1879
- Rhypopteryx syntomoides Collenette, 1957
- Rhypopteryx triangulifera (Hampson, 1910)
- Rhypopteryx tylota Collenette, 1957
- Rhypopteryx uele Collenette, 1960
- Rhypopteryx xuthosticta (Collenette, 1938)
