= Amphekes =

Scientific classification
- Domain: Eukaryota
- Kingdom: Animalia
- Phylum: Arthropoda
- Class: Insecta
- Order: Lepidoptera
- Superfamily: Noctuoidea
- Family: Erebidae
- Tribe: Lymantriini
- Genus: Amphekes; Collenette, 1936
- Species: A. gymna

Binomial name
- Amphekes gymna Collenette, 1936

Genus of moths

Amphekes is a monotypic moth genus in the subfamily Lymantriinae. Its only species, Amphekes gymna, is found in the Chinese province of Yunnan. Both the genus and the species were first described by Cyril Leslie Collenette in 1936.
