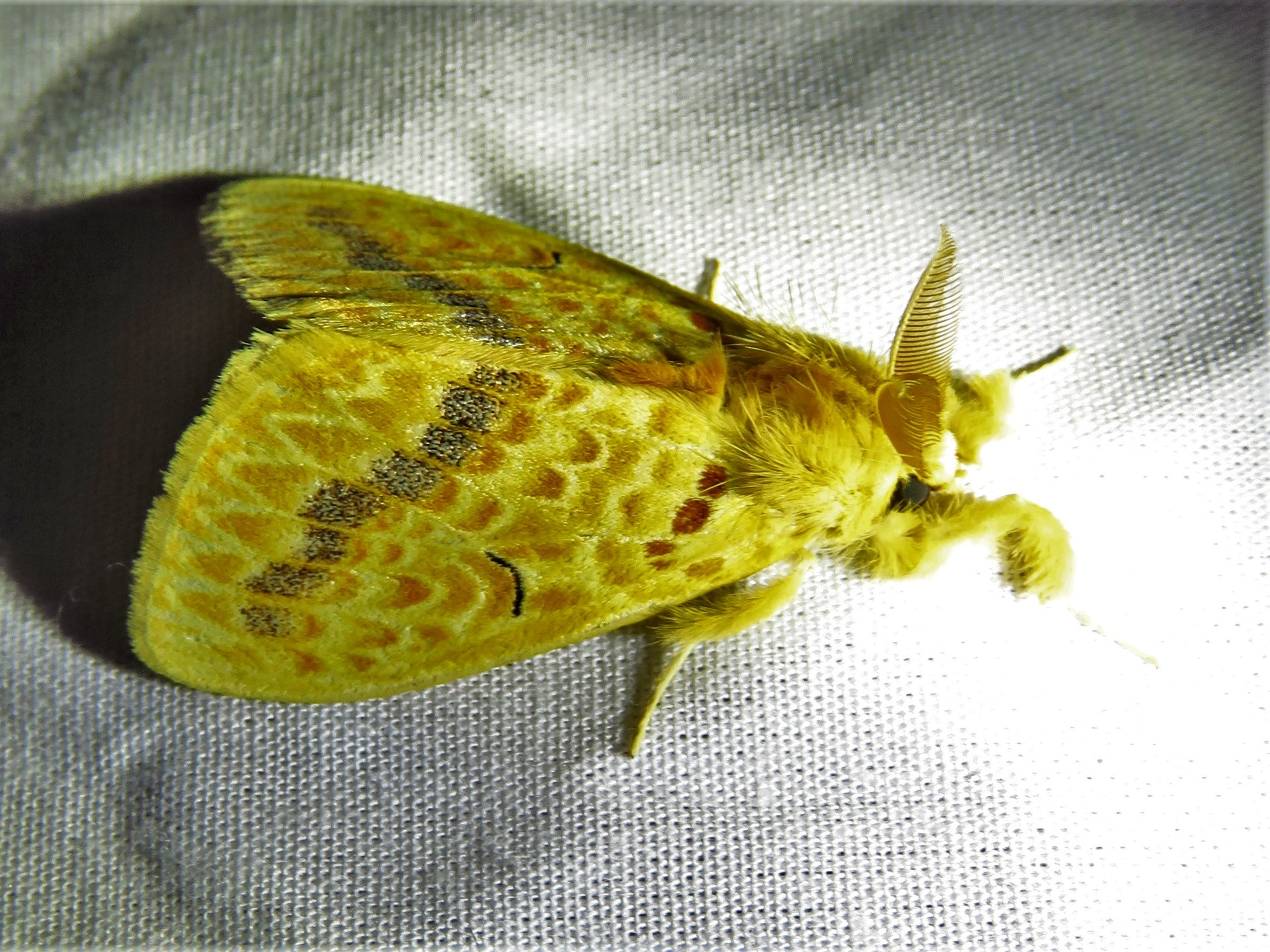

Scientific classification
- Kingdom: Animalia
- Phylum: Arthropoda
- Clade: Pancrustacea
- Class: Insecta
- Order: Lepidoptera
- Superfamily: Noctuoidea
- Family: Erebidae
- Tribe: Lymantriini
- Genus: Mylantria; Aurivillius, 1904
- Species: M. xanthospila

Binomial name
- Mylantria xanthospila (Plötz, 1880)

Synonyms
- Aroa xanthospila Plötz, 1880; Chaerotriche orestes H. Druce, 1887

= Mylantria =

Genus of moths

Mylantria is a monotypic moth genus in the subfamily Lymantriinae erected by Per Olof Christopher Aurivillius in 1904. Its only species, Mylantria xanthospila, was first described by Plötz in 1880. It is found in western Africa.
