= Melgona =

Scientific classification
- Domain: Eukaryota
- Kingdom: Animalia
- Phylum: Arthropoda
- Class: Insecta
- Order: Lepidoptera
- Superfamily: Noctuoidea
- Family: Erebidae
- Tribe: Lymantriini
- Genus: Melgona; Nye, 1980
- Species: M. conia

Binomial name
- Melgona conia (Collenette, 1956)

Synonyms
- Coniortodes Collenette, 1956

Genus of moths

Melgona is a monotypic moth genus in the subfamily Lymantriinae described by Nye in 1980. Its only species, Melgona conia, was first described by Cyril Leslie Collenette in 1956. It is found in Kenya, where it was described from Mount Elgon.
