= Albarracina =

Scientific classification
- Domain: Eukaryota
- Kingdom: Animalia
- Phylum: Arthropoda
- Class: Insecta
- Order: Lepidoptera
- Superfamily: Noctuoidea
- Family: Erebidae
- Tribe: Nygmiini
- Genus: Albarracina; Staudinger 1883

Genus of moths

Albarracina is a genus of tussock moths in the family Erebidae.

== Species ==
The following species are included in the genus.

- Albarracina alluaudi Oberthür, 1922
- Albarracina autumnalis Krüger, 1939
- Albarracina baui Standfuss, 1890
- Albarracina korbi Staudinger, 1883
- Albarracina syriaca Standfuss, 1890
- Albarracina warionis Oberthür, 1922
