= Anexotamos =

Scientific classification
- Domain: Eukaryota
- Kingdom: Animalia
- Phylum: Arthropoda
- Class: Insecta
- Order: Lepidoptera
- Superfamily: Noctuoidea
- Family: Erebidae
- Tribe: Lymantriini
- Genus: Anexotamos; Hering, 1926
- Species: A. flavibasis

Binomial name
- Anexotamos flavibasis Hering, 1926

Genus of moths

Anexotamos is a monotypic moth genus in the subfamily Lymantriinae. Its only species, Anexotamos flavibasis, is found in Uganda and Zaire. Both the genus and the species were first described by Hering in 1926.
