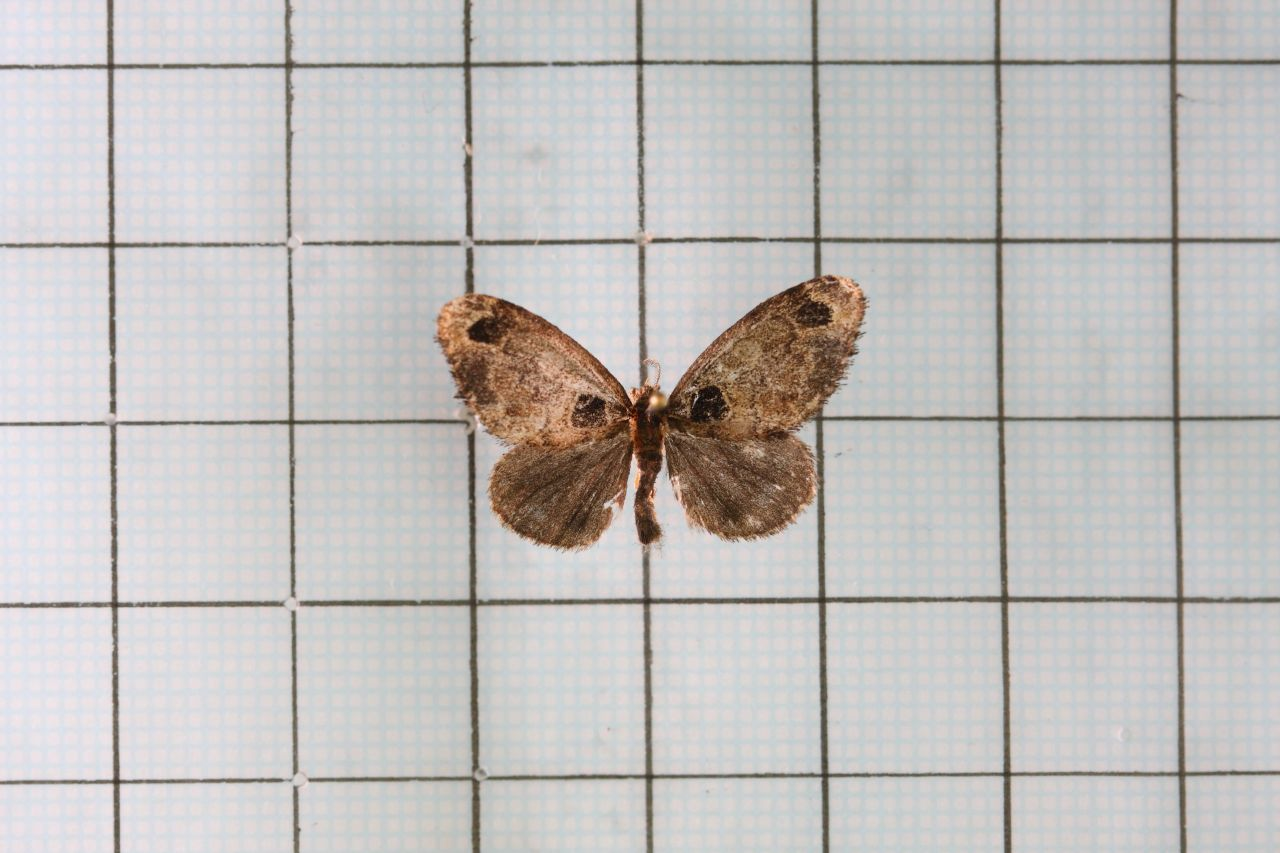
- Medama diplaga

Scientific classification
- Domain: Eukaryota
- Kingdom: Animalia
- Phylum: Arthropoda
- Class: Insecta
- Order: Lepidoptera
- Superfamily: Noctuoidea
- Family: Erebidae
- Tribe: Nygmiini
- Genus: Medama; Matsumura, 1933

= Medama (moth) =

Genus of moths

Medama is a genus of tussock moths in the family Erebidae. The genus was erected by Shōnen Matsumura in 1933.

== Species ==
- Medama diplaga (Hampson, 1910)
- Medama emeiensis Chao 1980
- Medama megerata (Collenette, 1935)
- Medama phaea (Hampson, 1900)
- Medama spatulidorsum Holloway, 1976
