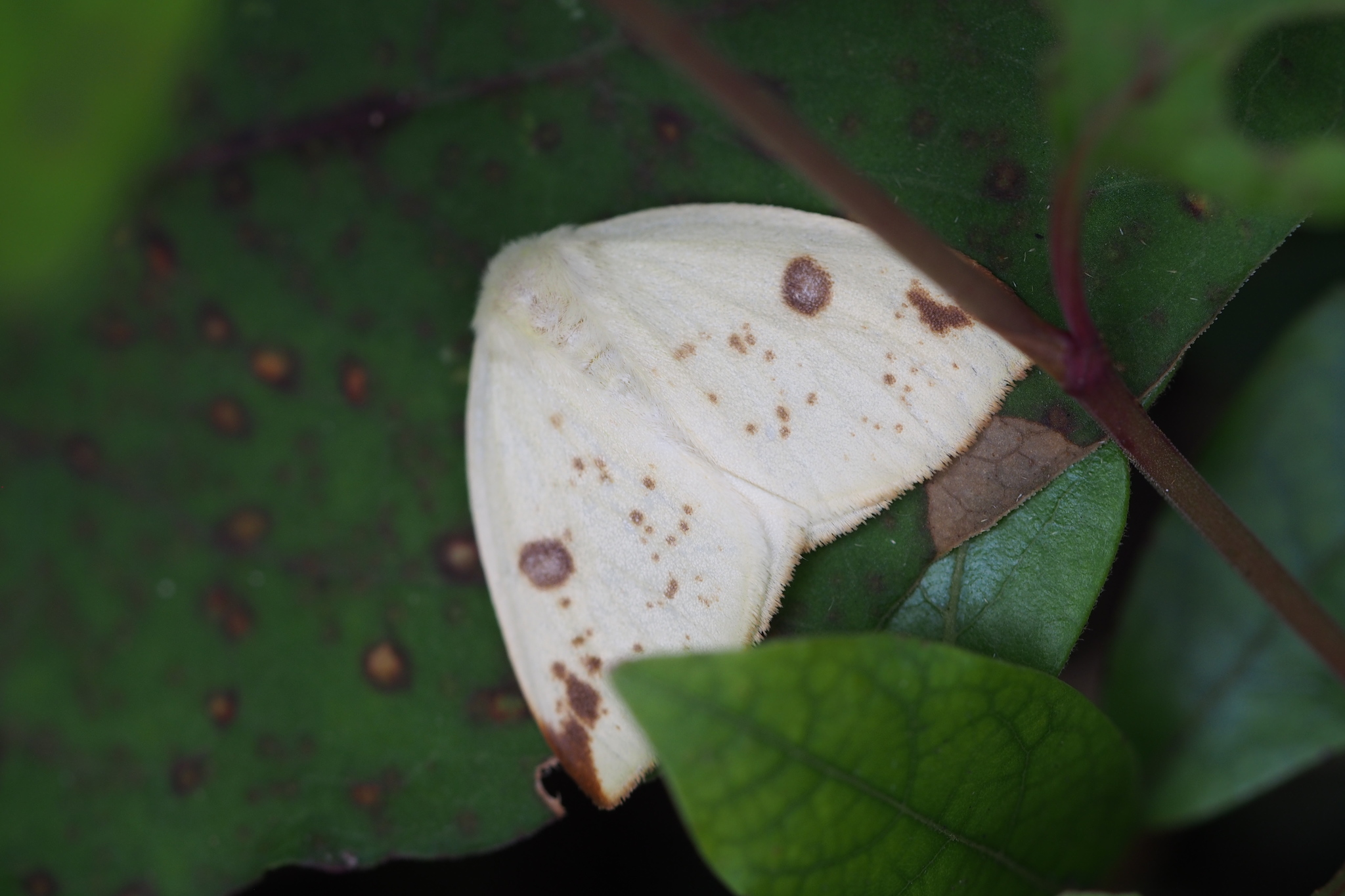

Scientific classification
- Kingdom: Animalia
- Phylum: Arthropoda
- Clade: Pancrustacea
- Class: Insecta
- Order: Lepidoptera
- Superfamily: Noctuoidea
- Family: Erebidae
- Genus: Arctornis
- Species: A. jonasii

Binomial name
- Arctornis jonasii (Butler, 1877)

Synonyms
- Aroa jonasii Butler, 1877; Topomesoides jonasii (Butler, 1877); Topomesoides gigantea Strand, 1910

= Arctornis jonasii =

Species of moth

Arctornis jonasii is a moth in the family Erebidae, originally placed in its own genus, Topomesoides, which was synonymized with Arctornis in 2015. It was first described by Arthur Gardiner Butler in 1877.

It is found in Japan and Korea. The larva feeds on Pourthiaea villosa and Sambucus sieboldiana.
