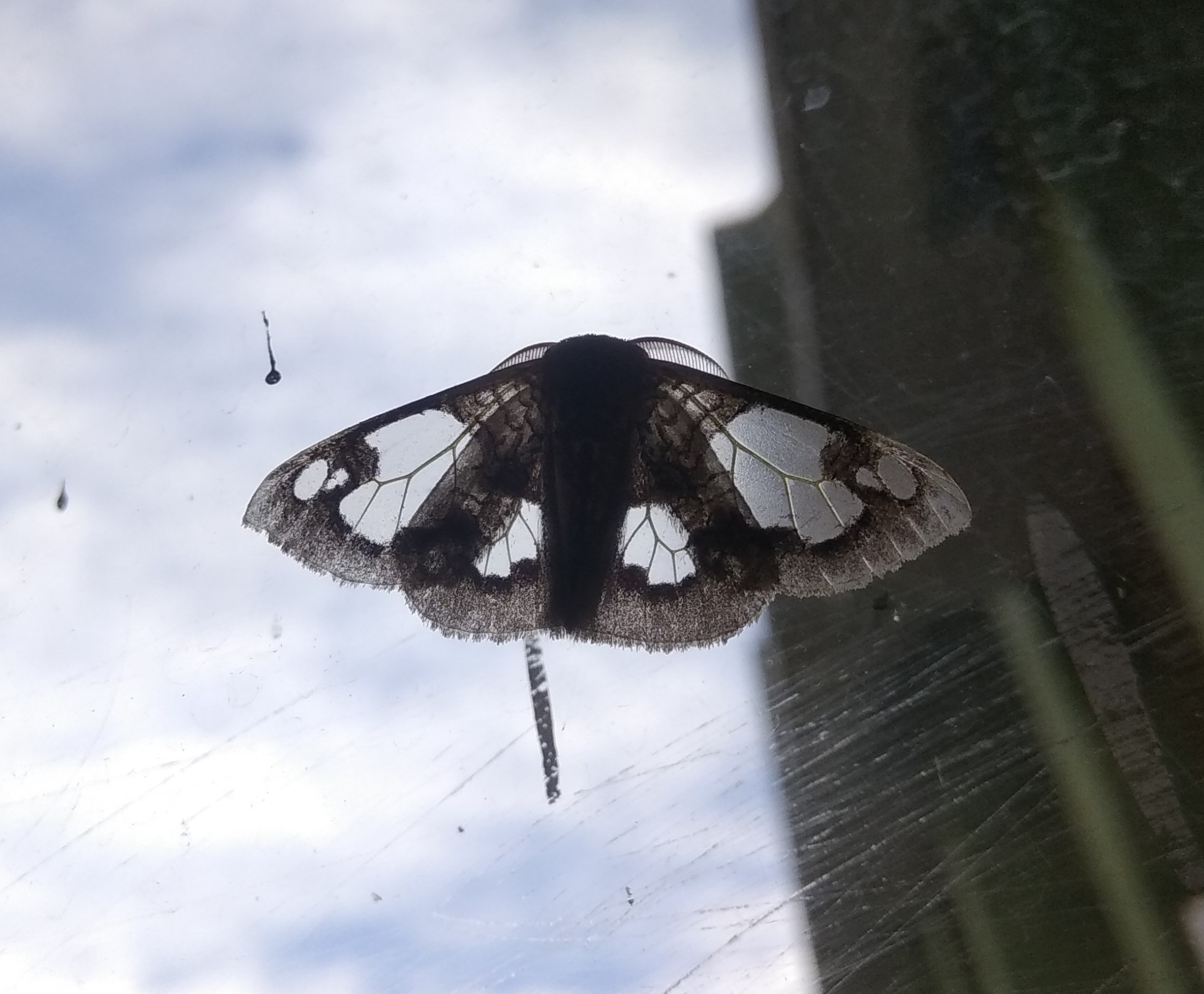

Scientific classification
- Kingdom: Animalia
- Phylum: Arthropoda
- Class: Insecta
- Order: Lepidoptera
- Superfamily: Noctuoidea
- Family: Erebidae
- Genus: Carriola
- Species: C. fenestrata

Binomial name
- Carriola fenestrata (Hampson, 1893)

Synonyms
- Leucoma fenestrata Hampson, [1893]; Leucoma thyridoptera Hampson, 1910; Redoa thyridoptera (Hampson, 1910)

= Carriola fenestrata =

Species of moth

Carriola fenestrata is a moth of the family Erebidae first described by George Hampson in 1893. It is found in India and Sri Lanka.

Its genus was synonymized with Arctornis in 2015 by Wang et al., and subsequently resurrected in 2024 by Shovkoon & Trofimova.
