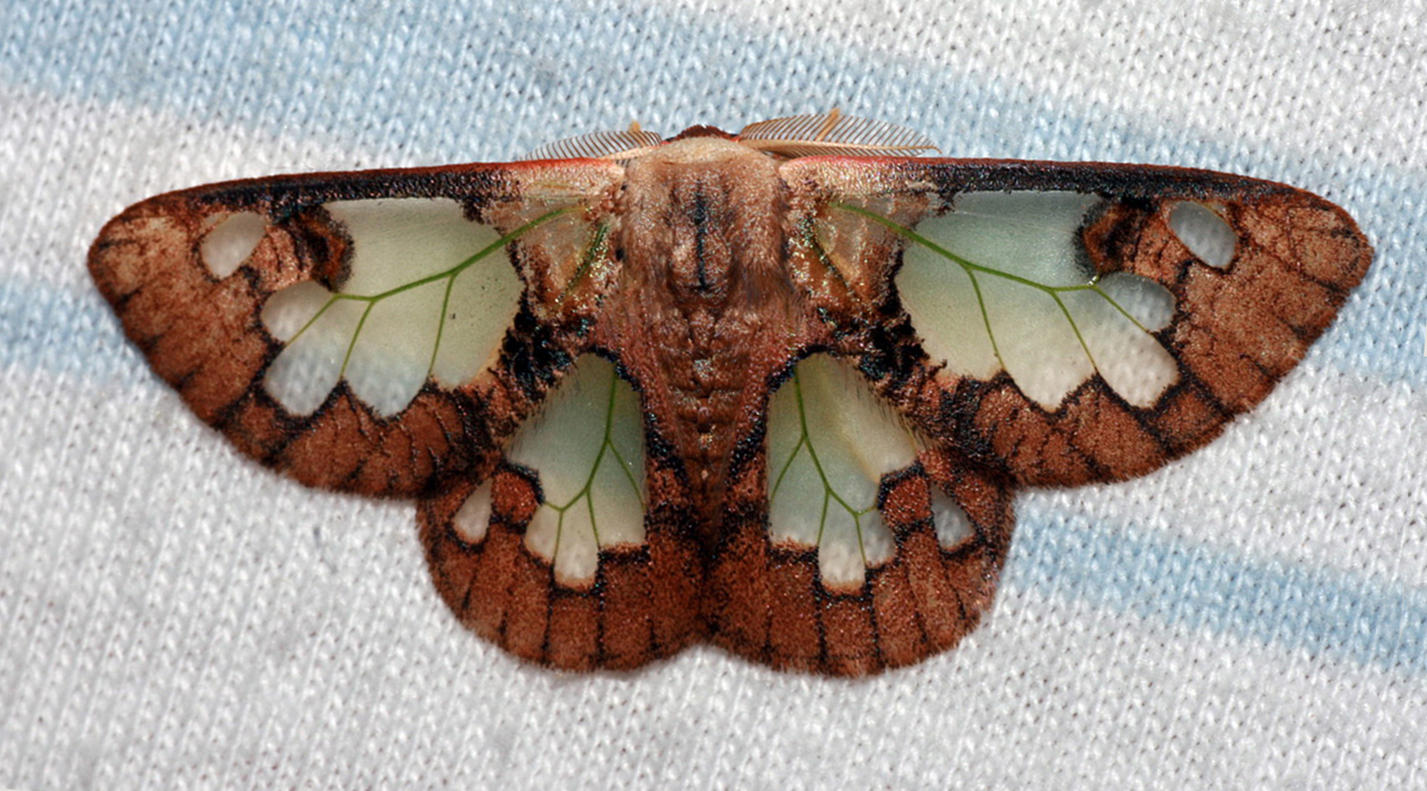
- Male

Scientific classification
- Domain: Eukaryota
- Kingdom: Animalia
- Phylum: Arthropoda
- Class: Insecta
- Order: Lepidoptera
- Superfamily: Noctuoidea
- Family: Erebidae
- Genus: Carriola
- Species: C. ecnomoda

Binomial name
- Carriola ecnomoda (C. Swinhoe, 1907)

Synonyms
- Leucoma ecnomoda C. Swinhoe, 1907

= Carriola ecnomoda =

Species of moth

Carriola ecnomoda is a moth of the family Erebidae first described by Charles Swinhoe in 1907. It is found south-eastern Asia, Sundaland and the Philippines. In 2015, the genus Carriola was synonymized with Arctornis by Wang et al., but subsequently revised in 2024 by Shovkoon & Trofimova.

The larvae have been reared on Durio species (durian).
