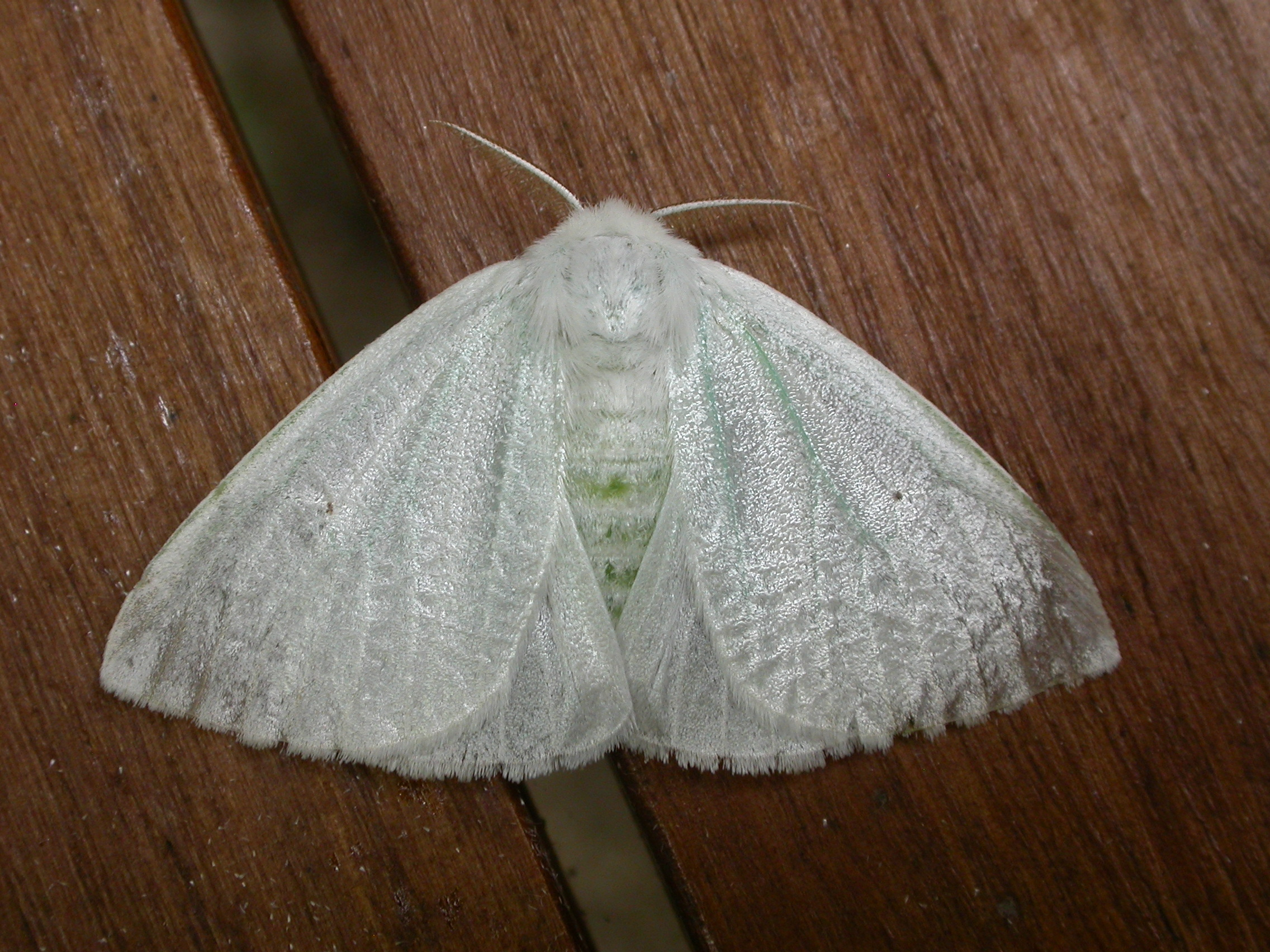

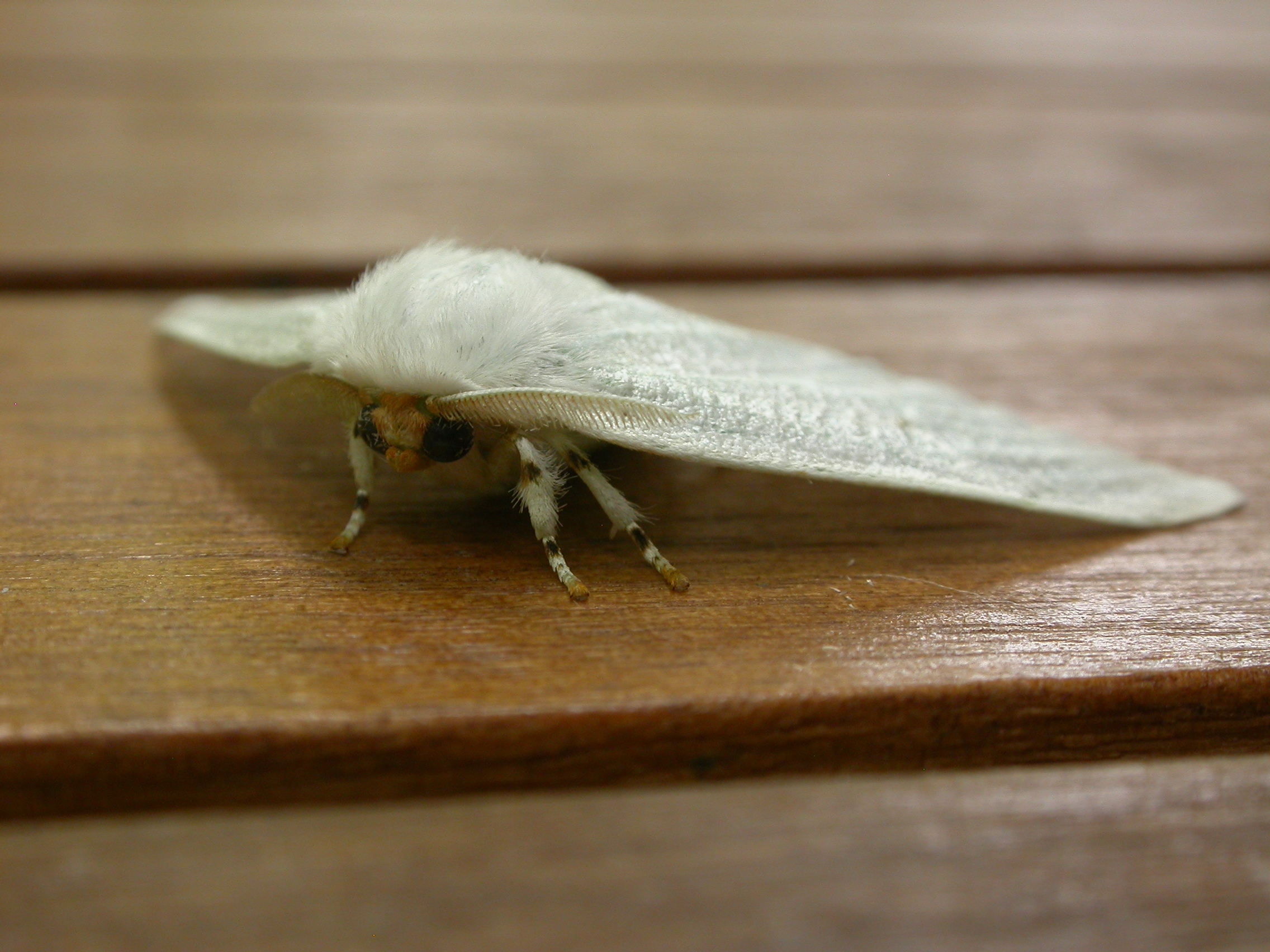

Scientific classification
- Kingdom: Animalia
- Phylum: Arthropoda
- Class: Insecta
- Order: Lepidoptera
- Superfamily: Noctuoidea
- Family: Erebidae
- Genus: Arctornis
- Species: A. submarginata

Binomial name
- Arctornis submarginata (Walker, 1855)

Synonyms
- Redoa submarginata Walker, 1855; Leucoma sikkima Strand, 1914; Leucoma keiana Hulstaert, 1923

= Arctornis submarginata =

Species of moth

Arctornis submarginata is a species of moth of the subfamily Lymantriinae of family Erebidae. It is found in the north-eastern Himalaya and Sikkim, Sri Lanka, on Borneo and Sumatra and in northern Australia.

== Description ==
Forewings with vein 10 anastomosing (fusing) slightly with veins 8 and 9 to form an areole. A pure white species with brown palpi, two brown spots on frons and a brown band between the antennae which have the brownish branches. Legs are spotted with black. Forewings are sprinkled with silvery scales. There is a black speck at end of the cell. Costa ochreous towards apex. The wing membrane is slightly corrugated on outer area. Cilia of both wings are more or less tinged with fuscous.

Larva pale fuscous with simple long scattered spatulate hairs. There is a dorsal tuft of long black hairs from the second somite. There are sub-dorsal and sub-lateral black lines present. The second somite with a yellow band present.

== Ecology ==
The larvae have been recorded feeding on bamboo and other hosts. They are a potential pest of tea. They defoliate their host plant.
