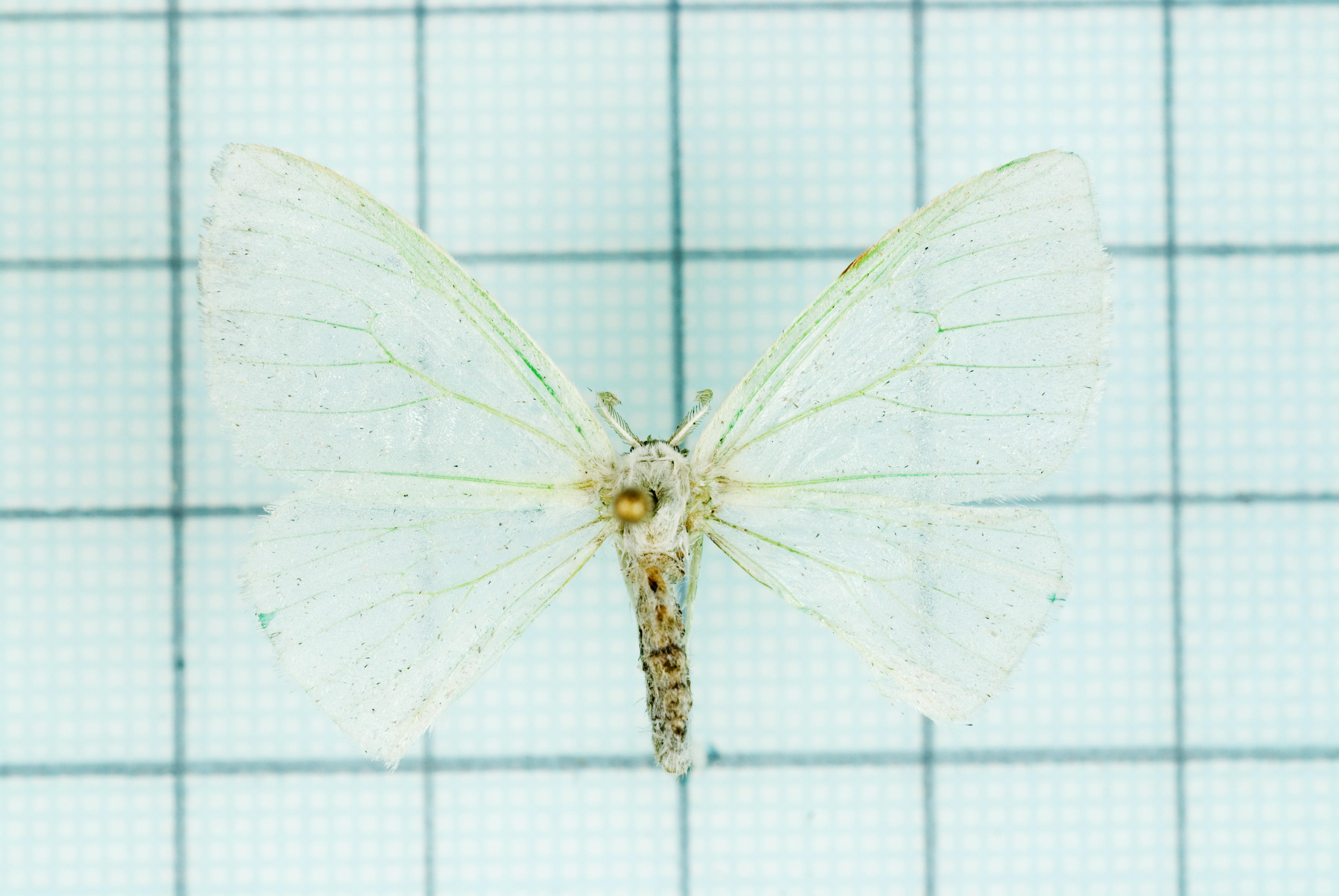

Scientific classification
- Domain: Eukaryota
- Kingdom: Animalia
- Phylum: Arthropoda
- Class: Insecta
- Order: Lepidoptera
- Superfamily: Noctuoidea
- Family: Erebidae
- Genus: Arctornis
- Species: A. cygna

Binomial name
- Arctornis cygna (Moore, 1879)

Synonyms
- Redoa cygna Moore, 1879; Leucoma cygna; Redoa cymbicormis Butler, 1881; Redoa nigricilia Swinhoe, 1891

= Arctornis cygna =

Species of moth

Arctornis cygna is a moth of the family Erebidae. It is found in Bengal, Sikkim, China, Taiwan Sri Lanka and Thailand.

== Description ==
The wingspan is 42–49 mm. Adults are on wing from May to December. Forewing has stalked vein 7, 8 and 9. Veins 10 and 11 are free from the cell. In the male, the head and thorax are pure white. Antennae are brownish. Abdomen fulvous and forelegs are bright orange. Forewings with white basal area from the costa middle to outer angle, where the rest of the wing is hyaline with traces of a postmedial band of silvery scales. Hindwings are pure white. In the female, the whole forewings are pure white with three raised bands of silvery-white scales on the outer half of the wing.

The larvae have been reported feeding on Durio zibethinus.
