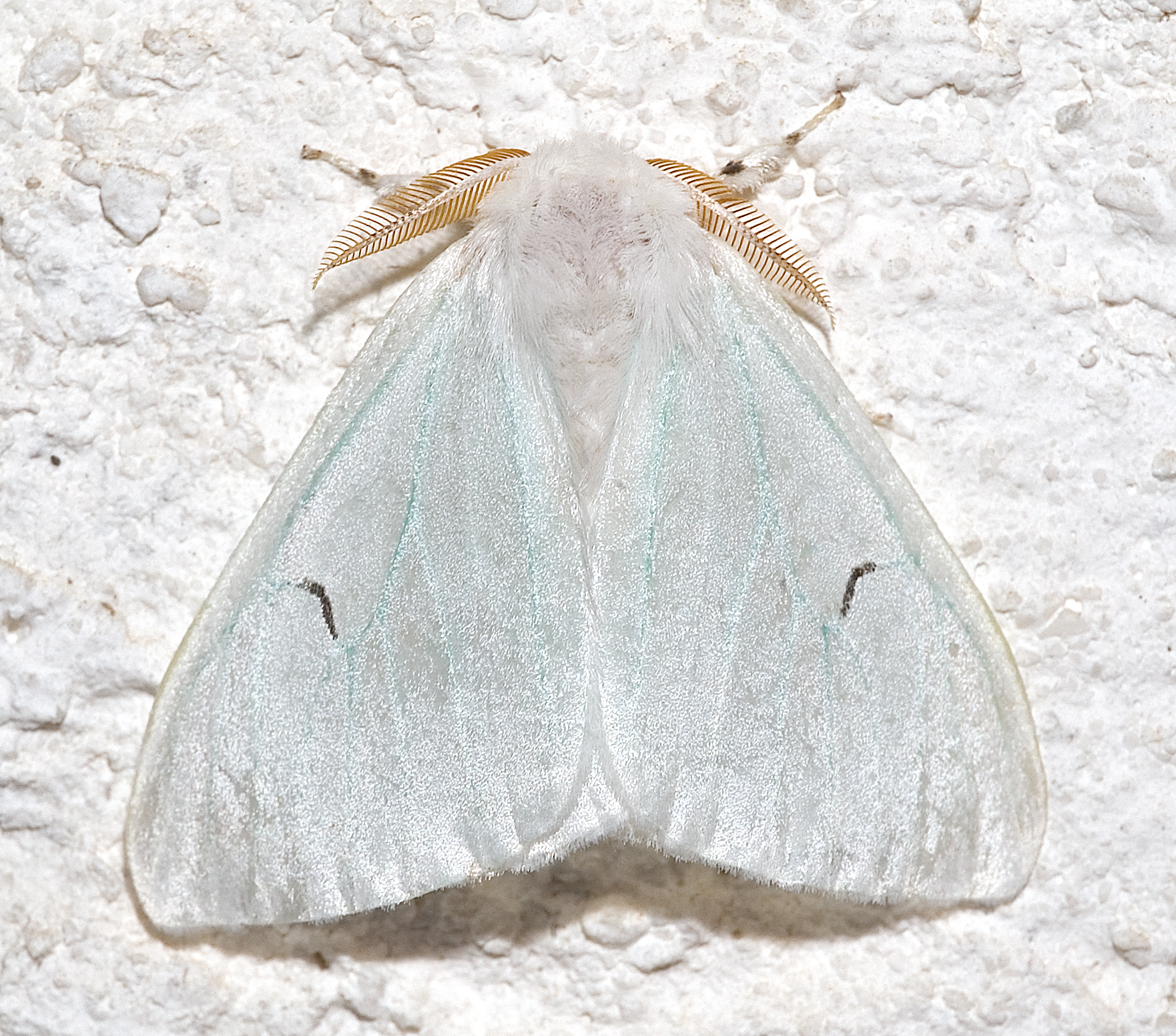
- Live specimen
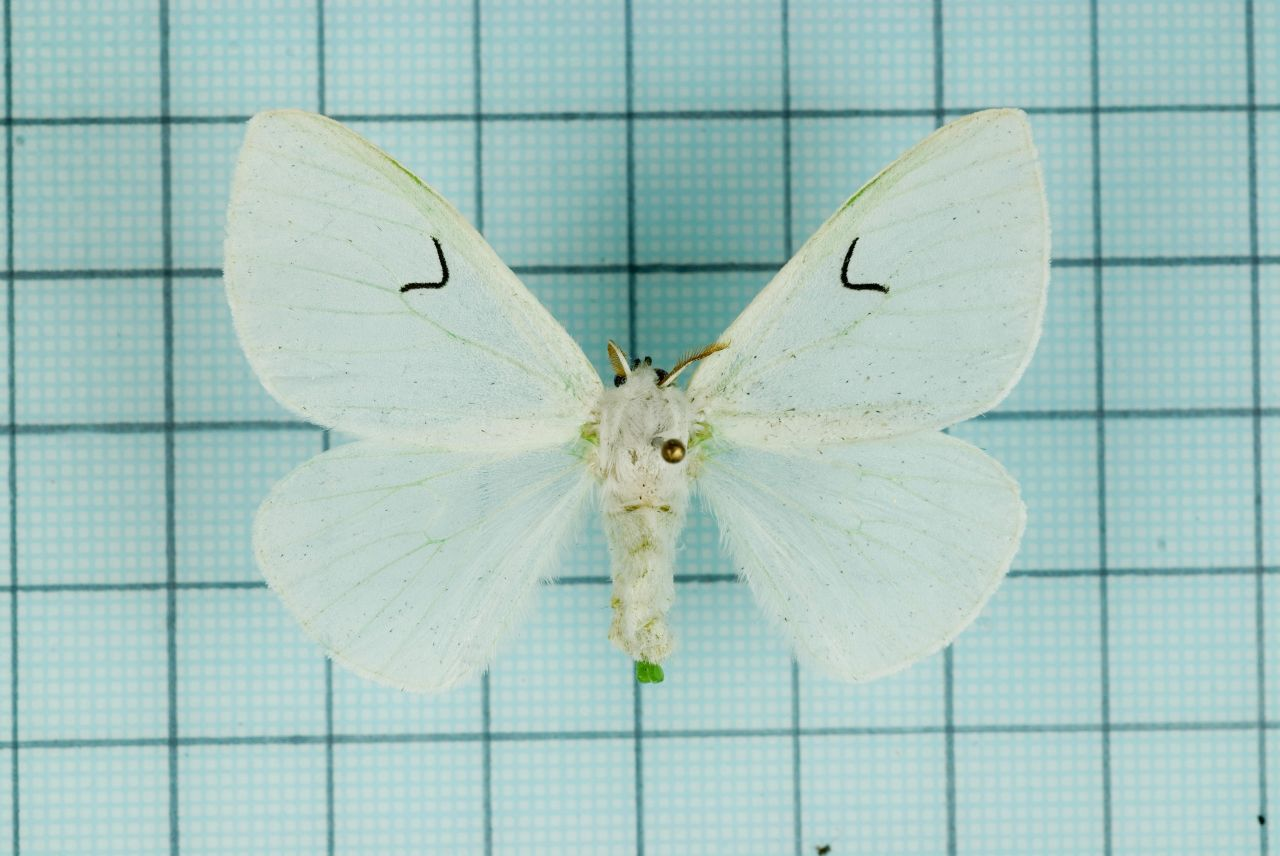
- Arctornis l-nigrum okurai

Scientific classification
- Domain: Eukaryota
- Kingdom: Animalia
- Phylum: Arthropoda
- Class: Insecta
- Order: Lepidoptera
- Superfamily: Noctuoidea
- Family: Erebidae
- Genus: Arctornis
- Species: A. l-nigrum

Binomial name
- Arctornis l-nigrum (Müller, 1764)

Synonyms
- Phalaena l-nigrum Müller, 1764; Arctornis pusillata Dannehl, 1926; Bombyx v-nigrum Fabricius, 1775; Bombyx nivosa Denis & Schiffermüller, 1775

= Arctornis l-nigrum =

Black V moth

Species of moth

Arctornis l-nigrum, the black V moth, is a moth of the family Erebidae. The species was described by Otto Friedrich Müller in 1764. It is found in the Palearctic realm and Asia.

The wingspan is 35–45 mm. The moth flies from May to July.

The caterpillars feed on beech and birch.

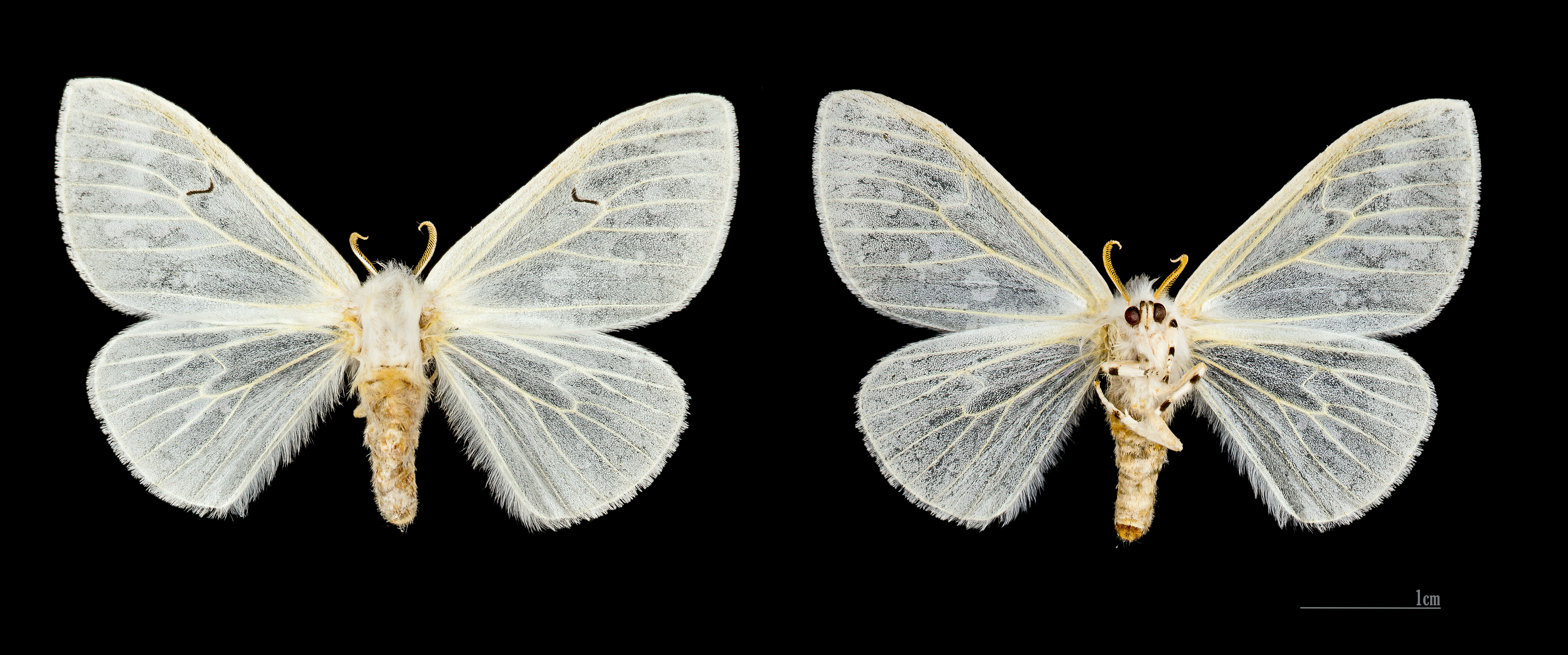
Female

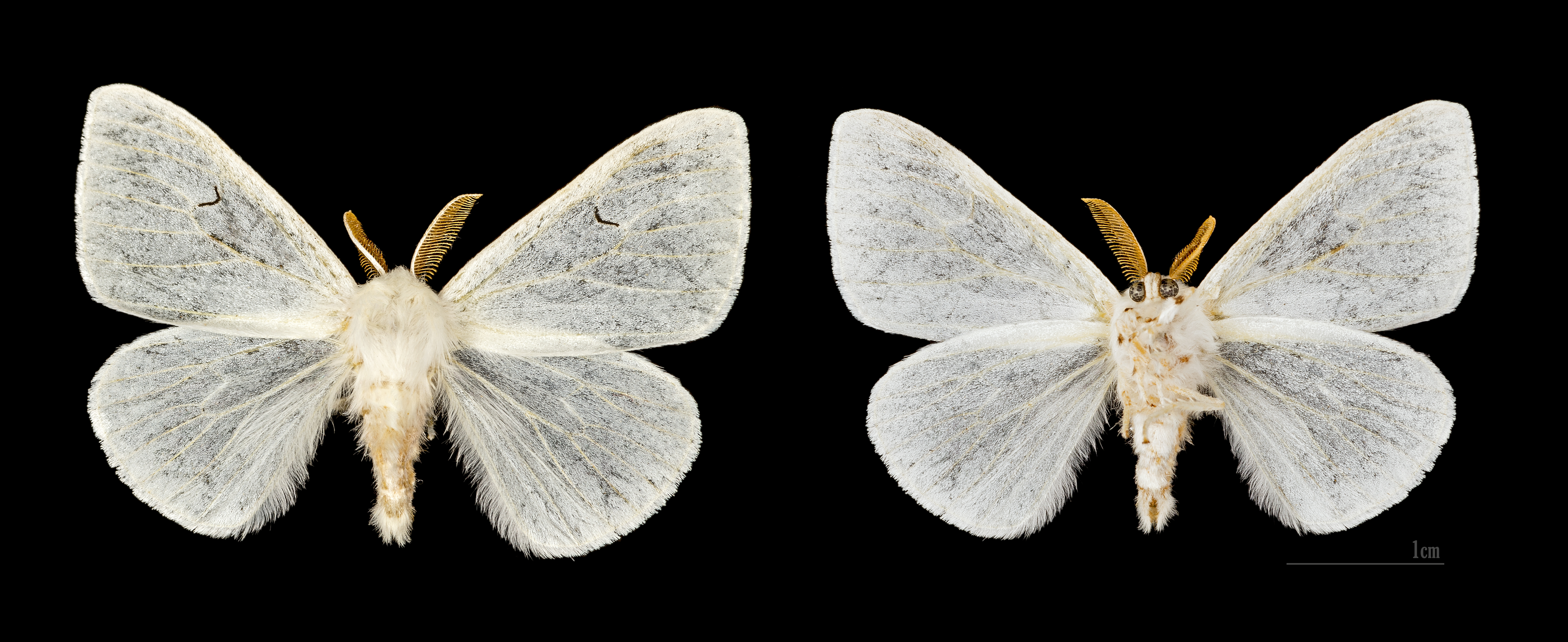
Male

== Subspecies ==
- Arctornis l-nigrum l-nigrum
- Arctornis l-nigrum asahinai (Inoue, 1956) (Japan)
- Arctornis l-nigrum okurai (Okano, 1959) (Taiwan)
- Arctornis l-nigrum ussurica Bytinski-Salz, 1939 (Ussuri)
