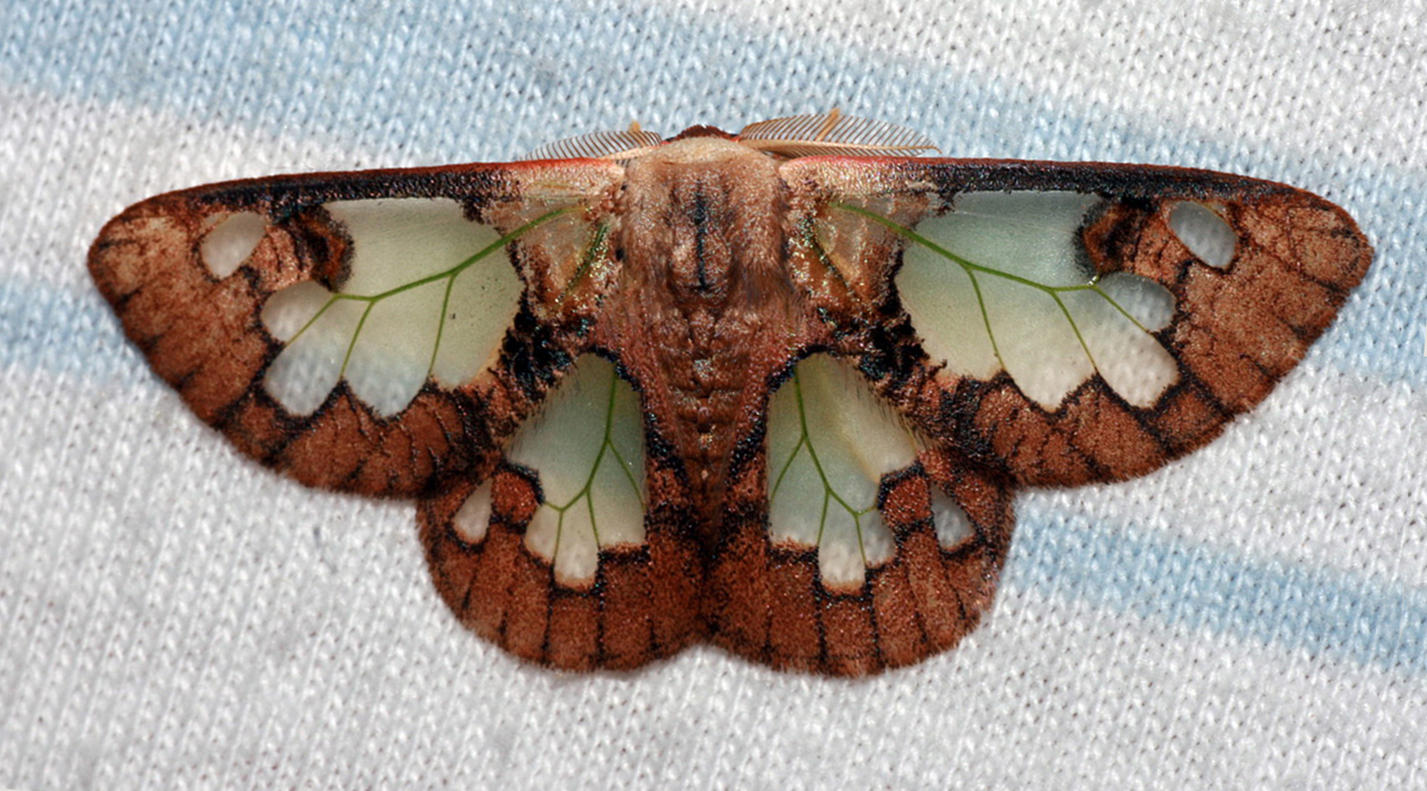
- Male Carriola ecnomoda

Scientific classification
- Kingdom: Animalia
- Phylum: Arthropoda
- Clade: Pancrustacea
- Class: Insecta
- Order: Lepidoptera
- Superfamily: Noctuoidea
- Family: Erebidae
- Tribe: Arctornithini
- Genus: Carriola; C. Swinhoe, 1922

Synonyms
- Ceylonica Gupta, Farooqi & Chaudhary, 1986

= Carriola =

Genus of moths

Carriola is a genus of tussock moths in the family Erebidae. The genus was erected by Charles Swinhoe in 1922. It was synonymized with Arctornis in 2015 by Wang et al., and subsequently revised in 2024 by Shovkoon & Trofimova.

== Species ==
- Carriola ecnomoda (C. Swinhoe, 1907)
- Carriola fenestrata (Hampson, [1893])
- Carriola polyakovi Shovkoon & Trofimova, 2024
- Carriola saturnoides (Snellen, 1879)
- Carriola seminsula (Strand, 1914)
- Carriola shorokhovi Shovkoon & Trofimova, 2024
- Carriola thyridophora (Hampson, [1893])
- Carriola witti Shovkoon & Trofimova, 2024
- Carriola zolotuhini Shovkoon & Trofimova, 2024
