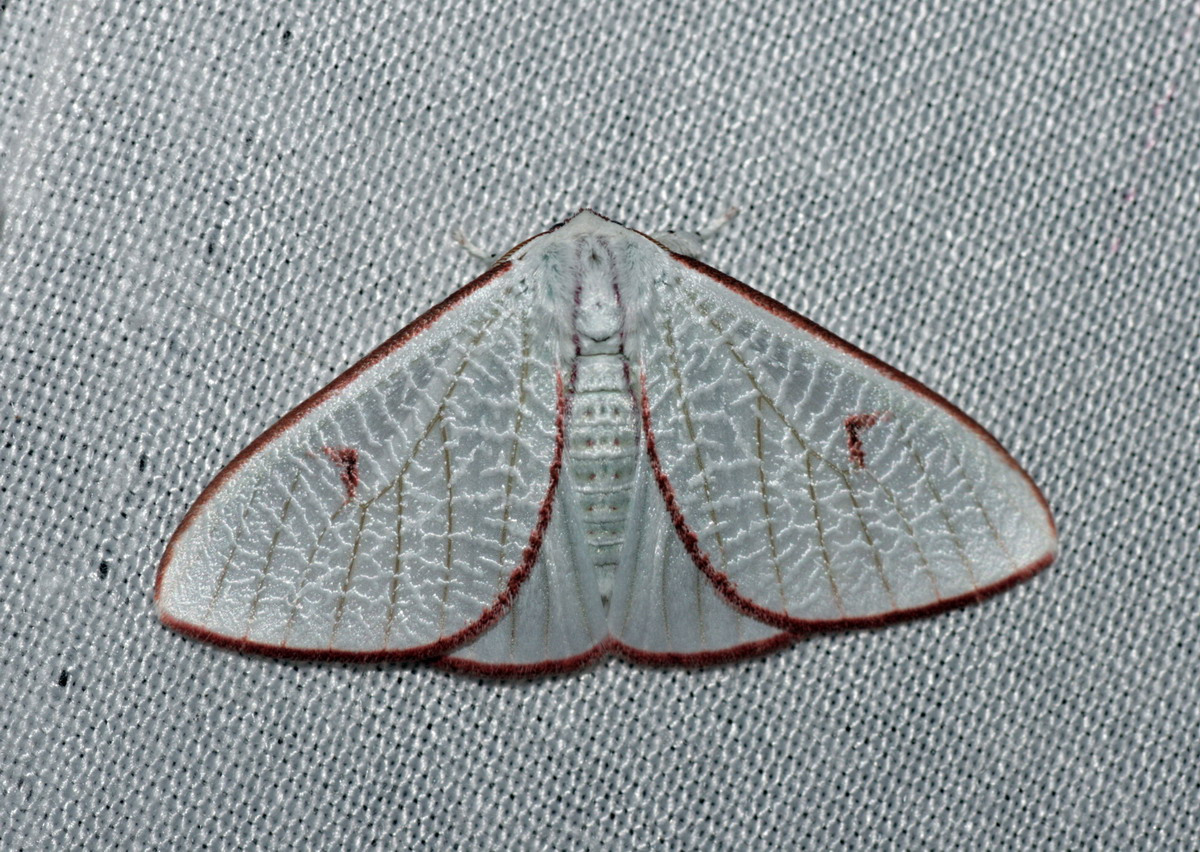

Scientific classification
- Domain: Eukaryota
- Kingdom: Animalia
- Phylum: Arthropoda
- Class: Insecta
- Order: Lepidoptera
- Superfamily: Noctuoidea
- Family: Erebidae
- Genus: Arctornis
- Species: A. egerina

Binomial name
- Arctornis egerina (C. Swinhoe, 1893)

Synonyms
- Leucoma egerina C. Swinhoe, 1893; Redoa egerina gymnophleps Collenette, 1938

= Arctornis egerina =

Species of moth

Arctornis egerina is a species of moth of the family Erebidae first described by Charles Swinhoe in 1893. It is found in Singapore, Peninsular Malaysia, Borneo and Sumatra.

== Subspecies ==
- Arctornis egerina egerina (Singapore, Peninsular Malaysia, Borneo)
- Arctornis egerina gymnophleps (Sumatra)
