= Arctornis subvitrea =

Scientific classification
- Kingdom: Animalia
- Phylum: Arthropoda
- Class: Insecta
- Order: Lepidoptera
- Superfamily: Noctuoidea
- Family: Erebidae
- Genus: Arctornis
- Species: A. subvitrea

Binomial name
- Arctornis subvitrea Walker, 1865

Species of moth

Arctornis subvitrea is a moth of the family Erebidae first described by Francis Walker in 1865. It is found in India and Sri Lanka.

The caterpillar eats Terminalia catappa and Carpinus viminea.
