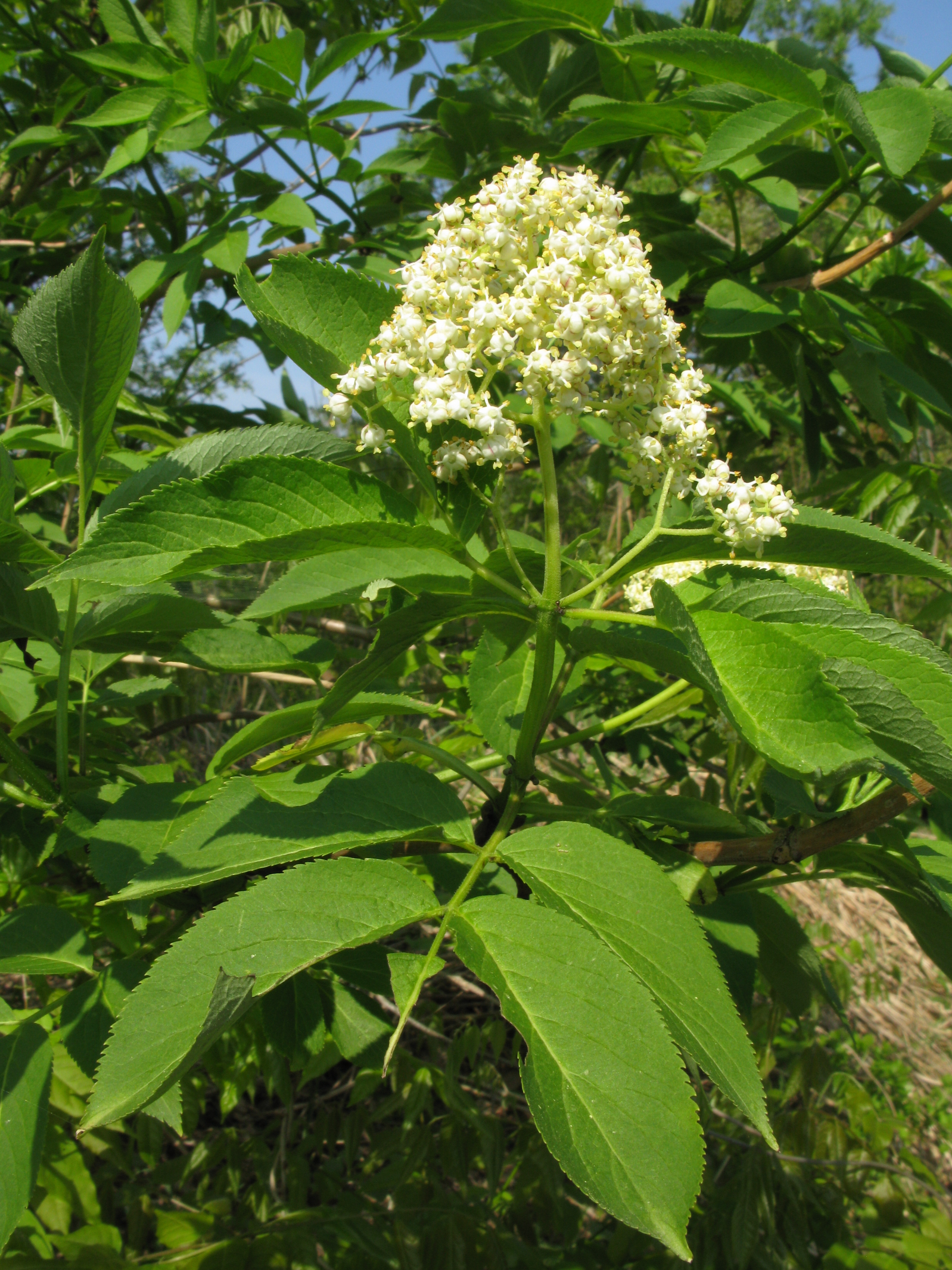
- Shrub in flower

Scientific classification
- Kingdom: Plantae
- Clade: Embryophytes
- Clade: Tracheophytes
- Clade: Spermatophytes
- Clade: Angiosperms
- Clade: Eudicots
- Clade: Asterids
- Order: Dipsacales
- Family: Viburnaceae
- Genus: Sambucus
- Species: S. sieboldiana

Binomial name
- Sambucus sieboldiana (Miquel) Blume ex Schwerin

= Sambucus sieboldiana =

Species of shrub

Sambucus sieboldiana, commonly called the Japanese red elder, is a deciduous shrub in thel family Viburnaceae. It is native to East Asia, where it is found in Japan and Korea. Its natural habitat is in thickets and forest edges, in low elevations. It is a common species throughout its range.

== Description ==
It is a deciduous shrub or small tree growing up to a height of 4 metres (13 ft) tall. Its leaves are opposite and pinnately compound, with 5-7 toothed leaflets. It produces a panicle of small white flowers in late spring, which are insect pollinated and hermaphroditic. Its fruits are ~4 mm long, red, and round. They are dispersed by birds.

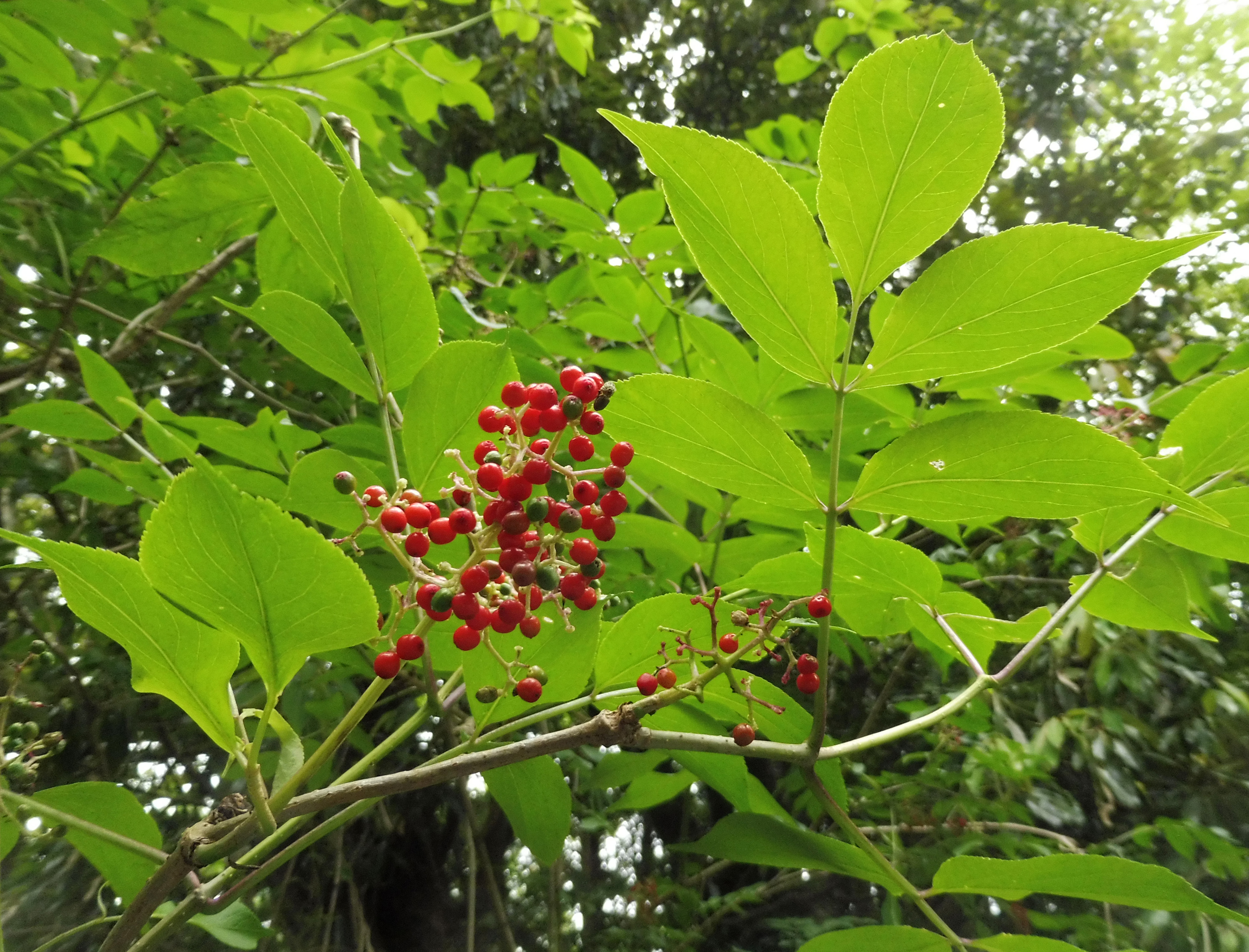
Mature red fruits

== Taxonomy ==
The Latin specific epithet sieboldiana refers to German physician and botanist Philipp Franz von Siebold (1796-1866).

A closely related plant in China, Sambucus williamsii, was once included in Sambucus sieboldiana but is now classified as a separate species.

== Toxins ==
Members of this genus are poisonous and the fruit has been known to cause stomach upsets in some people, but no records of this have been found for S. sieboldiana; any toxins that may be in the fruit would be destroyed upon cooking and would have a low toxicity.
