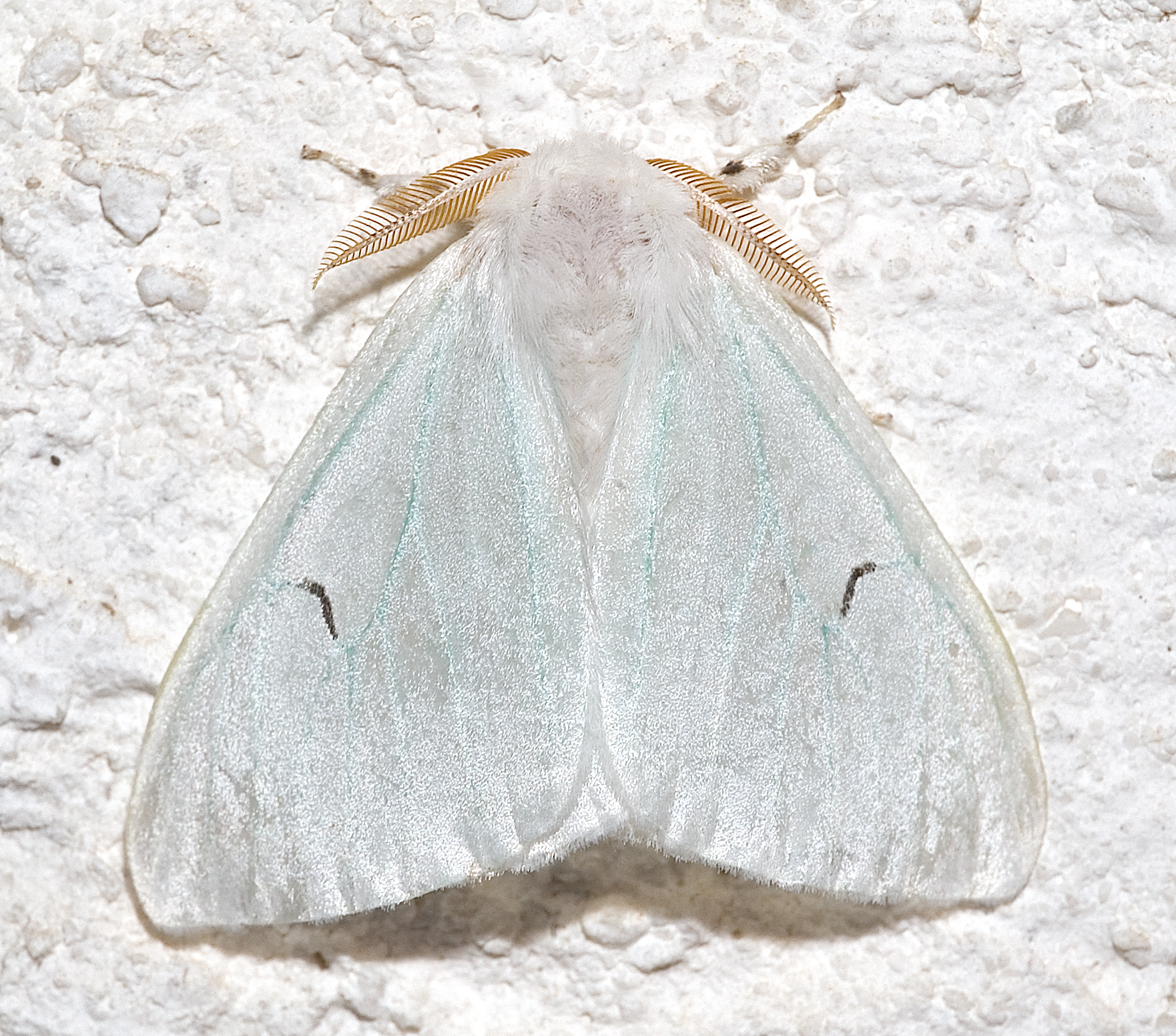
- Arctornis l-nigrum

Scientific classification
- Kingdom: Animalia
- Phylum: Arthropoda
- Clade: Pancrustacea
- Class: Insecta
- Order: Lepidoptera
- Superfamily: Noctuoidea
- Family: Erebidae
- Subfamily: Lymantriinae
- Tribe: Arctornithini; Holloway, 1999
- Genus: Arctornis; Germar, 1810

Synonyms
- Redoa Walker, 1855; Scarpona Walker, 1862; Cassidia Walker, 1862; Chatracharta Walker, 1862; Ciaca Walker, 1865; Sitvia Walker, 1865; Topomesa Walker, 1866; Kettelia Butler, 1879; Cobanilla Moore, [1883]; Kanchia Moore, [1883]; Topomesoides Strand, 1910; Carriola Swinhoe, 1922 - disputed, treated as separate genus by Shovkoon & Trofimova 2024; Lymantralex Collenette, 1938; Ceylonica Gupta, Farooqi & Chaudhary, 1986

= Arctornis =

Genus of moths

Arctornis is a genus of tussock moths in the family Erebidae, the namesake of the tribe Arctornithini, and disputedly the sole genus in the tribe. (Note: Wang et al in 2015 considered it the sole genus in the tribe, with several other genera (Carriola, Topomesoides and Sitvia) deemed synonyms of Arctornis. Shovkoon & Trofimova in 2024 revised the status of Carriola, restoring it to the status of separate genus within Arctornithini.) The genus was erected by Ernst Friedrich Germar in 1810.

== Species ==
The following species are included in the genus:

- Arctornis adusta Toxopeus, 1948
- Arctornis alba Bremer, 1861
- Arctornis albescens Holloway, 1999
- Arctornis anser Collenette, 1938
- Arctornis anserella Collenette, 1938
- Arctornis arbor-christi Toxopeus, 1948
- Arctornis ardea Holloway, 1999
- Arctornis asymmetricus Holloway, 1999
- Arctornis aureopalpatus Holloway, 1999
- Arctornis bicalcaratus Holloway, 1999
- Arctornis bilobuncus Holloway, 1999
- Arctornis bisetosus Holloway, 1999
- Arctornis brunnescens Holloway, 1999
- Arctornis byssina Toxopeus, 1948
- Arctornis calcariphallus Holloway, 1999
- Arctornis camurisquama Collenette, 1932
- Arctornis ceconimena Collenette, 1935
- Arctornis chichibense Matsumura, 1921
- Arctornis clavigera Toxopeus, 1948
- Arctornis clavimicruncus Holloway, 1999
- Arctornis cloanges Collenette, 1935
- Arctornis comma Hutton, 1865
- Arctornis contrarcuatus Holloway, 1999
- Arctornis corrugata Toxopeus, 1948
- Arctornis cretosanaphtha Holloway, 1999
- Arctornis cretoserratus Holloway, 1999
- Arctornis crocophala Collenette, 1951
- Arctornis crocoptera Collenette, 1934
- Arctornis cygna Moore, 1879
- Arctornis cygnopsis Collenette, 1934
- Arctornis denudata (Walker, 1865)
- Arctornis dialitha Collenette, 1938
- Arctornis diaphana Moore, 1879
- Arctornis diaphora Collenette, 1934
- Arctornis diatreta Toxopeus, 1948
- Arctornis dinawa Bethune-Baker, 1904
- Arctornis discirufa C. Swinhoe, 1903
- Arctornis divisa Walker, 1855
- Arctornis dorsalineatus Holloway, 1999
- Arctornis egens Felder, 1861
- Arctornis egerina C. Swinhoe, 1893
- Arctornis erasmia Toxopeus, 1948
- Arctornis excavatus Holloway, 1999
- Arctornis faucium Holloway, 1999
- Arctornis fenestriculata Strand, 1910
- Arctornis ferruginicosta Holloway, 1999
- Arctornis flaccida Toxopeus, 1948
- Arctornis flaminea Toxopeus, 1948
- Arctornis flavescens Moore, 1877
- Arctornis flavicostatum Matsumura, 1927
- Arctornis flora C. Swinhoe, 1903
- Arctornis florella Collenette, 1935
- Arctornis formosensis Strand, 1922
- Arctornis galanthina Toxopeus, 1948
- Arctornis galene Toxopeus, 1948
- Arctornis gelasphora Collenette, 1935
- Arctornis graciliclava Holloway, 1999
- Arctornis hedleyi Holloway, 1999
- Arctornis hemilabda Collenette, 1938
- Arctornis heteroides Collenette, 1938
- Arctornis hipparia C. Swinhoe, 1893
- Arctornis intacta Walker, 1866
- Arctornis isabella Toxopeus, 1948
- Arctornis jonasii (Butler, 1877)
- Arctornis kanazawai Inoue, 1982
- Arctornis karoli (Semper, 1899)
- Arctornis kenya Collenette, 1931
- Arctornis keranganaphtha Holloway, 1999
- Arctornis kumatai Inoue, 1956
- Arctornis l-nigrum Mueller, 1794 – black V moth
- Arctornis labi Holloway, 1999
- Arctornis lactea Moore, 1879
- Arctornis leucoscela Collenette, 1934
- Arctornis linguluncus Holloway, 1999
- Arctornis linteola Toxopeus, 1948
- Arctornis listrophora Collenette, 1951
- Arctornis lumulosa Mackey, 1984
- Arctornis macrocera Sharpe, 1890
- Arctornis magnaclava Holloway, 1999
- Arctornis mallephrika Holloway, 1999
- Arctornis malleuncus Holloway, 1999
- Arctornis marginalis Walker, 1862
- Arctornis marginata Moore, 1883*
- Arctornis marginata (Aurivillius, 1894)
- Arctornis melanocraspis Hampson, 1905
- Arctornis meridionalis Holloway, 1982
- Arctornis micacea Walker, 1862
- Arctornis minutissima C. Swinhoe, 1903
- Arctornis monobalia Collenette, 1933
- Arctornis montananaphtha Holloway, 1999
- Arctornis moorei Leech, 1899
- Arctornis mulunaphtha Holloway, 1999
- Arctornis naphtha Holloway, 1999
- Arctornis nigrobustus Holloway, 1999
- Arctornis niphobola Collenette, 1932
- Arctornis nivosa Walker, 1865
- Arctornis obtusa Walker, 1862
- Arctornis opalina Collenette, 1951
- Arctornis oranaphtha Holloway, 1999
- Arctornis ouria Collenette, 1938
- Arctornis palea Toxopeus, 1948
- Arctornis parvaclava Holloway, 1999
- Arctornis pellucida C. Swinhoe, 1903
- Arctornis pellucidoides Holloway, 1999
- Arctornis peninsularis Holloway, 1982
- Arctornis perfecta Walker, 1862
- Arctornis phaeocraspeda Collenette, 1938
- Arctornis phasmatodes Collenette, 1932
- Arctornis phrika Collenette, 1932
- Arctornis plumbacea C. Swinhoe, 1903
- Arctornis poecilonipha Collenette, 1932
- Arctornis prasioneura Toxopeus, 1948
- Arctornis primula C. Swinhoe, 1903
- Arctornis pseudungula Holloway, 1999
- Arctornis psola Collenette, 1938
- Arctornis rhopica Toxopeus, 1948
- Arctornis riguata Snellen, 1895
- Arctornis rufimarginata C. Swinhoe, 1903
- Arctornis rugosacculus Holloway, 1999
- Arctornis rutila Fabricius, 1781
- Arctornis salebrosa Toxopeus, 1948
- Arctornis salsa Toxopeus, 1948
- Arctornis satinata Toxopeus, 1948
- Arctornis sclerotuncus Holloway, 1999
- Arctornis secula Holloway, 1999
- Arctornis semihyalina C. Swinhoe, 1904
- Arctornis sericea Moore, 1877
- Arctornis silhetica Walker, 1865
- Arctornis sinensis Moore, 1877
- Arctornis singaporensis Strand, 1914
- Arctornis sinuoharpe Holloway, 1999
- Arctornis stibiessa Collenette, 1951
- Arctornis submarginata Walker, 1855
- Arctornis subvitrea Walker, 1865
- Arctornis tortricoides Walker, 1862
- Arctornis tossa Collenette, 1947
- Arctornis transiens Walker, 1862
- Arctornis trasiana Collenette, 1933
- Arctornis tricorniger Holloway, 1999
- Arctornis ungula Holloway, 1999
- Arctornis velutina Toxopeus, 1948
- Arctornis virgamicruncus Holloway, 1999
- Arctornis xanthochila Collenette, 1935
- Arctornis xuthocraspeda Collenette, 1938
