= List of lymantriid genera: H =

The large moth subfamily Lymantriinae contains the following genera beginning with H:

- Habrophylla
- Halseyella
- Hemerophanes
- Heteronygmia
- Himala
- Homaroa
- Homochira
- Homoeomeria
- Hyaloperina
