= Homoeomeria =

Homoeomeria (also written homœomeria, homeomeria, homoiomeriae, homoeomery, homœomery, homeomery) is the state or quality of being homogeneous in elements or first principles; likeness or identity of parts.

== Biology ==
- Homoeomeria (moth), a genus of moths in the family Erebidae

== Philosophy ==
- Homoeomeria (philosophy)
