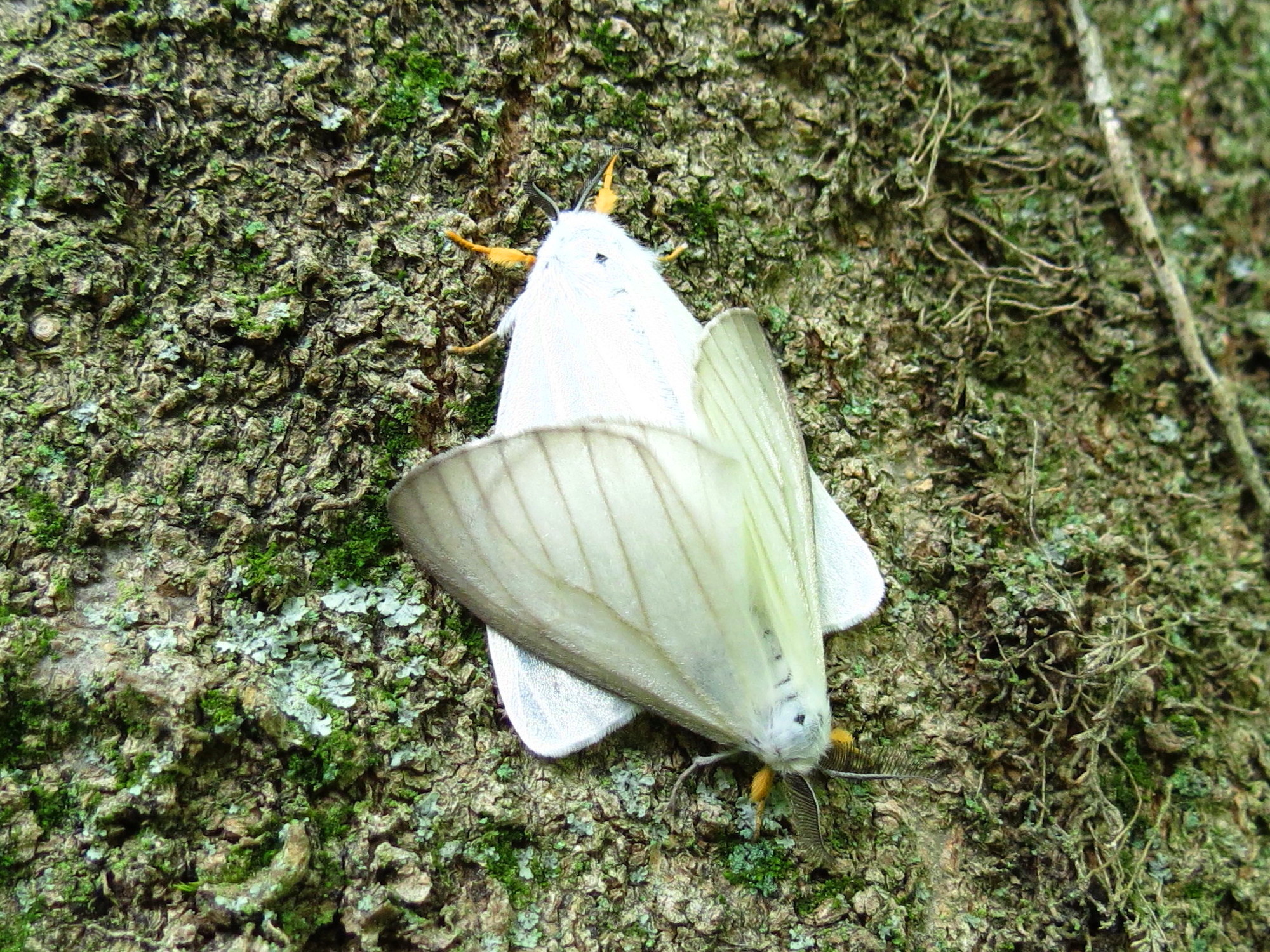
- Ivela auripes mating

Scientific classification
- Domain: Eukaryota
- Kingdom: Animalia
- Phylum: Arthropoda
- Class: Insecta
- Order: Lepidoptera
- Superfamily: Noctuoidea
- Family: Erebidae
- Subfamily: Lymantriinae
- Genus: Ivela; C. Swinhoe, 1903

= Ivela =

Genus of moths

Ivela is a genus of moths in the subfamily Lymantriinae. The genus was erected by Charles Swinhoe in 1903. The type species is I. auripes.

== Species ==
- Ivela auripes Butler, 1877
- Ivela eshanensis C. L. Chao, 1983 (transferred to Himala eshanensis since 2000)
- Ivela ochropoda Eversmann, 1847
- Ivela yini Xie & Wang, 2022
