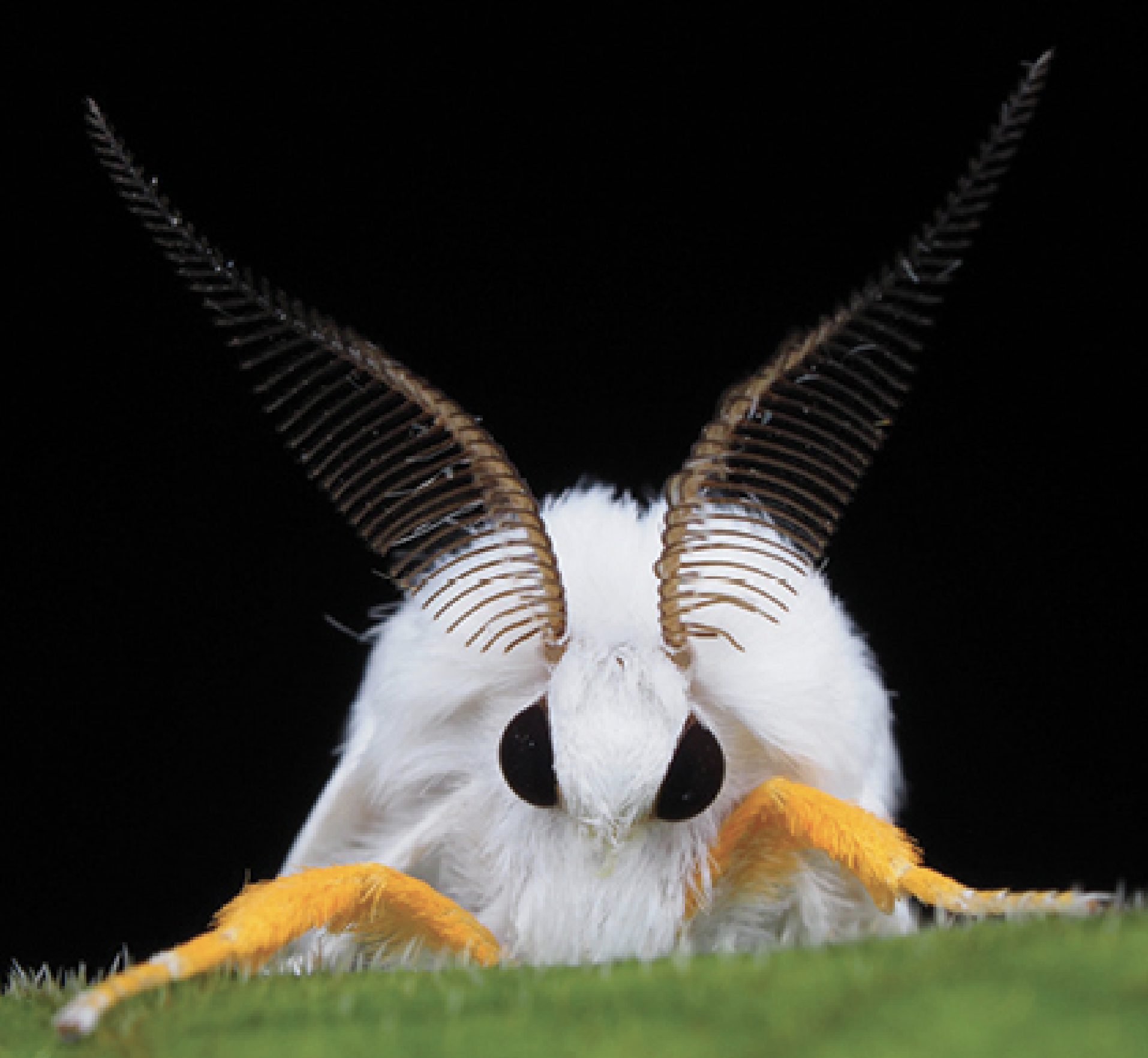

Scientific classification
- Kingdom: Animalia
- Phylum: Arthropoda
- Class: Insecta
- Order: Lepidoptera
- Superfamily: Noctuoidea
- Family: Erebidae
- Genus: Ivela
- Species: I. yini

Binomial name
- Ivela yini Xie & Wang, 2022

= Ivela yini =

Species of moth

Ivela yini is a species of moth from the genus Ivela. It was originally described by Lin-Zhe Xie and Hou-Shuai Wang in 2022.

== Description ==
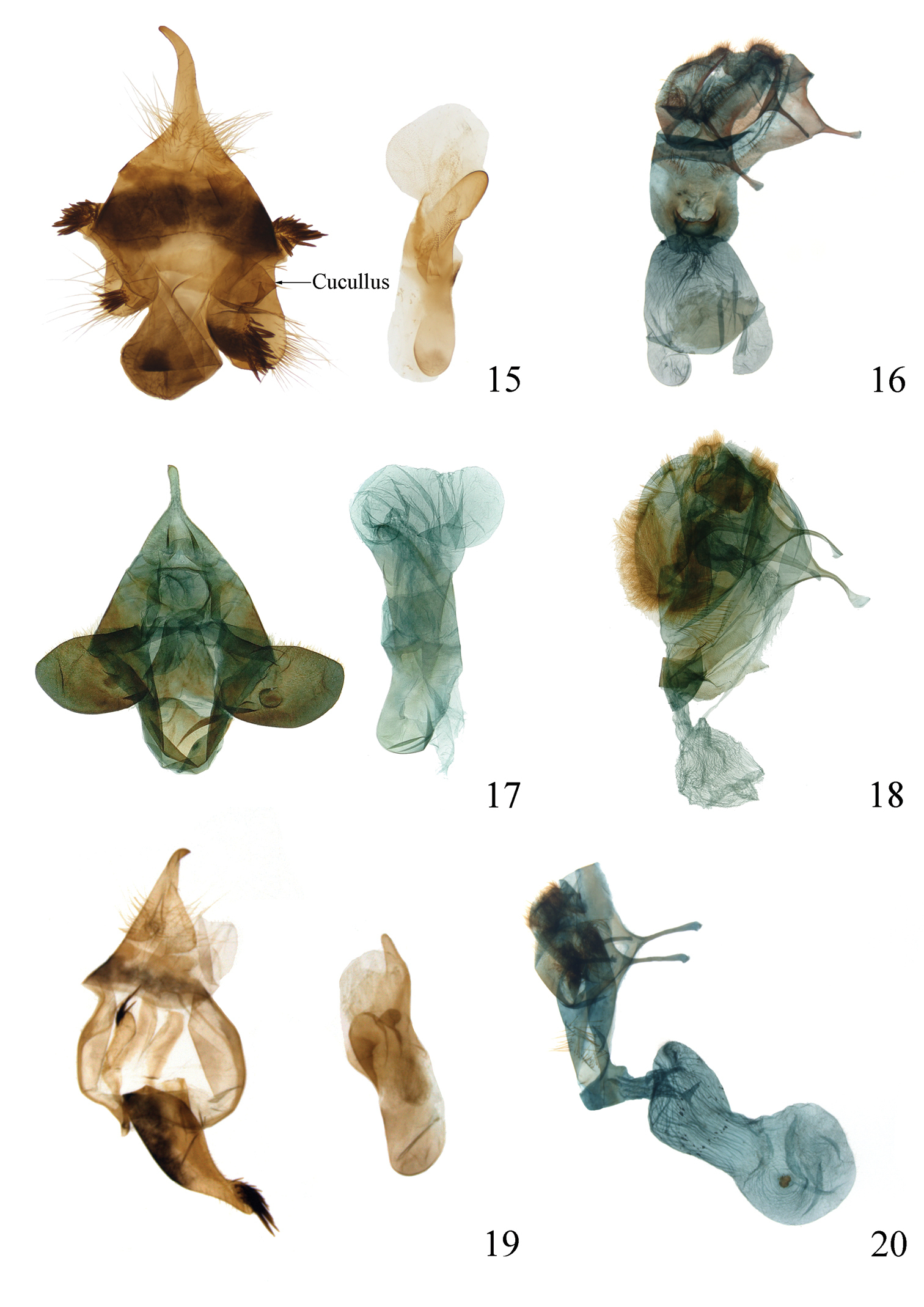
Difference in genitalia is a distinctive feature to identify I. yini

Ivela yini is a tussock moth that resembles Dendrophleps semihyalina. The specimens of this species are superficially similar to several tussock moths with which it is sympatric. I. yini specimens can be distinguished by superficial differences of which some are shown below where I. yini and Dendrophlebs semihyalina are compared, but can also be confirmed by dissecting the genetalia.

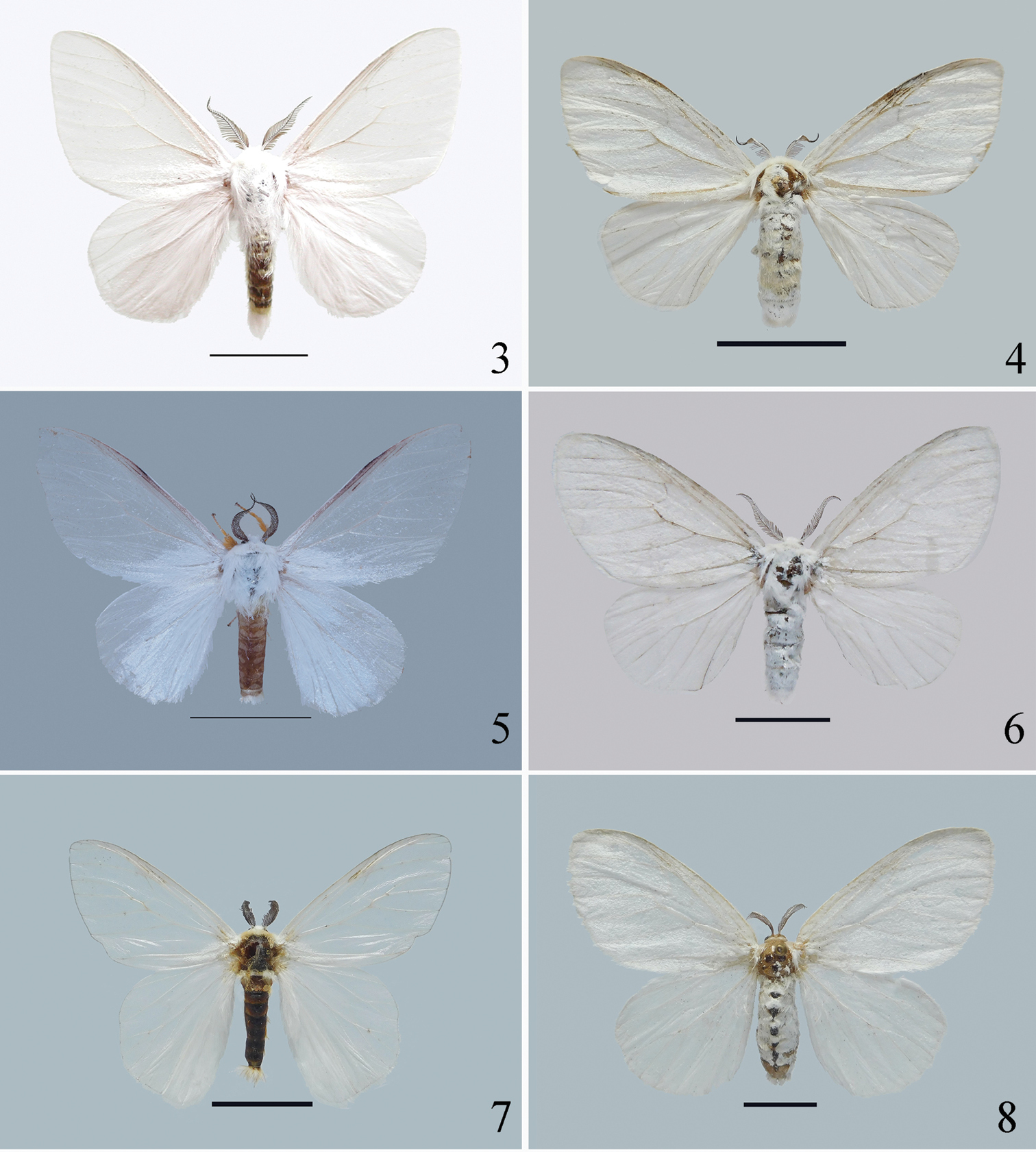
Figures 3–8. Adults 3‒6 Ivela yini sp. nov. (3 male, holotype 4 female, paratype 5 male, paratype 6 female, paratype) 7, 8 Dendrophleps semihyalina (7 male 8 female). Scale bars: 10 mm.

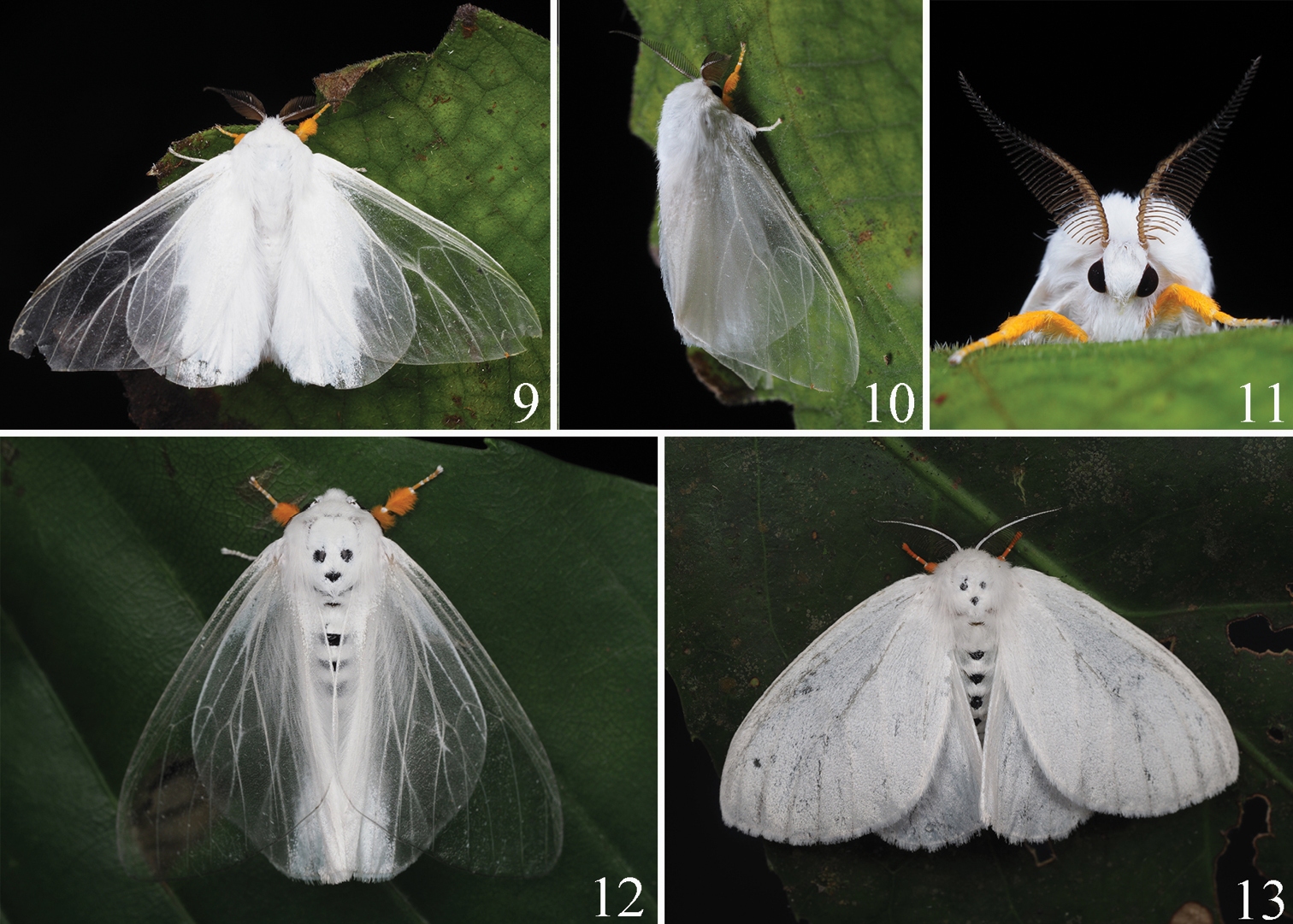
Figures 9–13. Field images of adults 9‒11 Ivela yini sp. nov. male (9 dorsal view 10 lateral view 11 ventral view of head) 12, 13 Dendrophleps semihyalina (12 male, dorsal view 13 female, dorsal view).

== Range & habitat ==
Both the holotype and paratypes were found in a forest between 1000‒1315 m in elevation in the Nanling National Nature Reserve in Guangdong, in South China.

== Etymology ==
Ivela yini is named after Ran Yin, who discovered the pupa. The name is in the genitive form.
