= Homaroa =

Scientific classification
- Kingdom: Animalia
- Phylum: Arthropoda
- Clade: Pancrustacea
- Class: Insecta
- Order: Lepidoptera
- Superfamily: Noctuoidea
- Family: Erebidae
- Tribe: Lymantriini
- Genus: Homaroa; Collenette, 1955

Genus of moths

Homaroa is a genus of moths in the subfamily Lymantriinae. The genus was defined by Cyril Leslie Collenette in 1955. The species are found on Madagascar.

Afromoths gives this genus as a synonym of Sychnacedes Collenette, 1953.

== Species ==
- Homaroa brontonepha (Collenette, 1931)
- Homaroa epiclithra Collenette, 1955
- Homaroa frieda Collenette, 1959
- Homaroa tamsi Collenette, 1959
