= Hyaloperina =

Scientific classification
- Domain: Eukaryota
- Kingdom: Animalia
- Phylum: Arthropoda
- Class: Insecta
- Order: Lepidoptera
- Superfamily: Noctuoidea
- Family: Erebidae
- Tribe: Lymantriini
- Genus: Hyaloperina; Aurivillius, 1904

Genus of moths

Hyaloperina is a genus of moths in the subfamily Lymantriinae. The genus was erected by Per Olof Christopher Aurivillius in 1904.

== Species ==
- Hyaloperina erythroma Collenette, 1960 Tanzania
- Hyaloperina nudiuscula Aurivillius, 1904 Congo
- Hyaloperina privata Hering, 1926 western Africa
- Hyaloperina vitrina Hering, 1926
