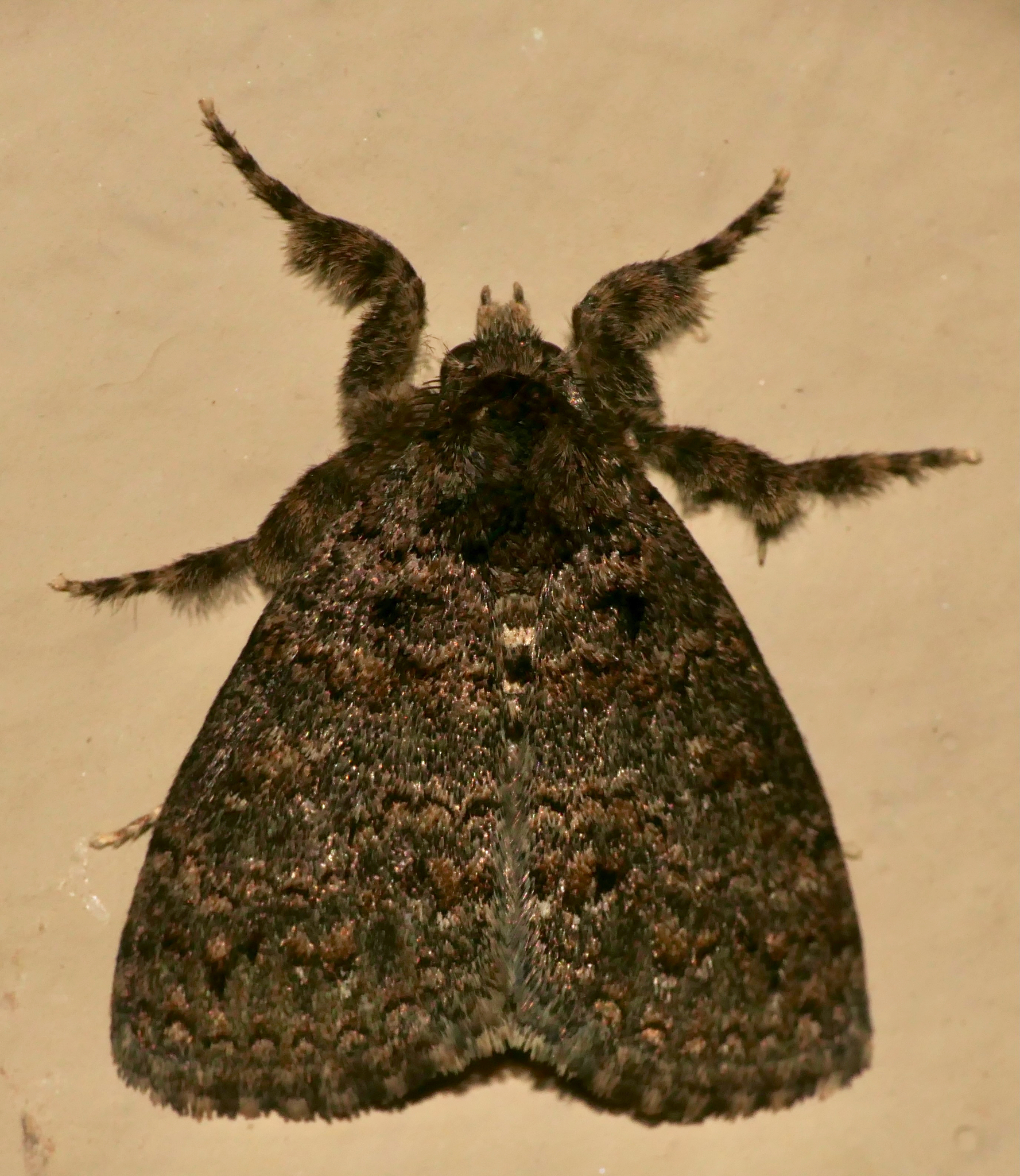
- Homochira rendalli

Scientific classification
- Kingdom: Animalia
- Phylum: Arthropoda
- Clade: Pancrustacea
- Class: Insecta
- Order: Lepidoptera
- Superfamily: Noctuoidea
- Family: Erebidae
- Tribe: Lymantriini
- Genus: Homochira; Hampson, 1905

= Homochira =

Genus of moths

Homochira is a genus of moths in the subfamily Lymantriinae. The genus was erected by George Hampson in 1905.

== Species ==
- Homochira rendalli (Distant, 1897) southern Africa
- Homochira crenulata (Bethune-Baker, 1911) Nigeria
- Homochira gephyra (Hering, 1926)
- Homochira mintha (Fawcett, 1918) eastern Africa
- Homochira poecilosticta Collenette, 1938 Mozambique
