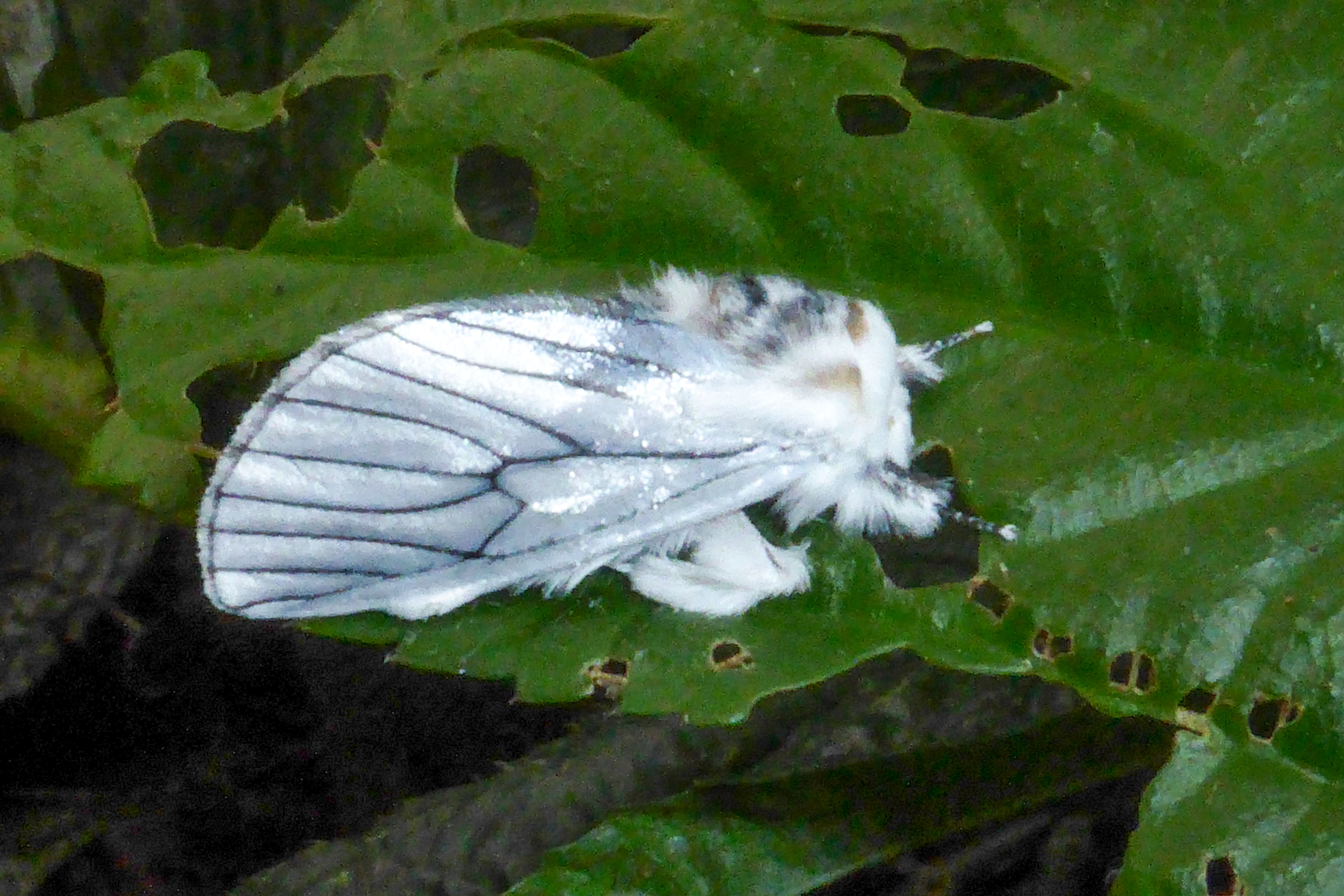
- Himala argentea

Scientific classification
- Kingdom: Animalia
- Phylum: Arthropoda
- Class: Insecta
- Order: Lepidoptera
- Superfamily: Noctuoidea
- Family: Erebidae
- Subfamily: Lymantriinae
- Genus: Himala; Moore, 1879

= Himala (moth) =

Genus of moths

Himala is a genus of moths in the subfamily Lymantriinae. The genus was erected by Moore in 1879.

== Species ==
- Himala argentea Walker, 1855
- Himala eshanensis C. L. Chao, 1983 - transferred from Ivela eshanensis since 2000
- Himala nigripennis Kishida, 2000 - captured by Owada, 1995, 1997
