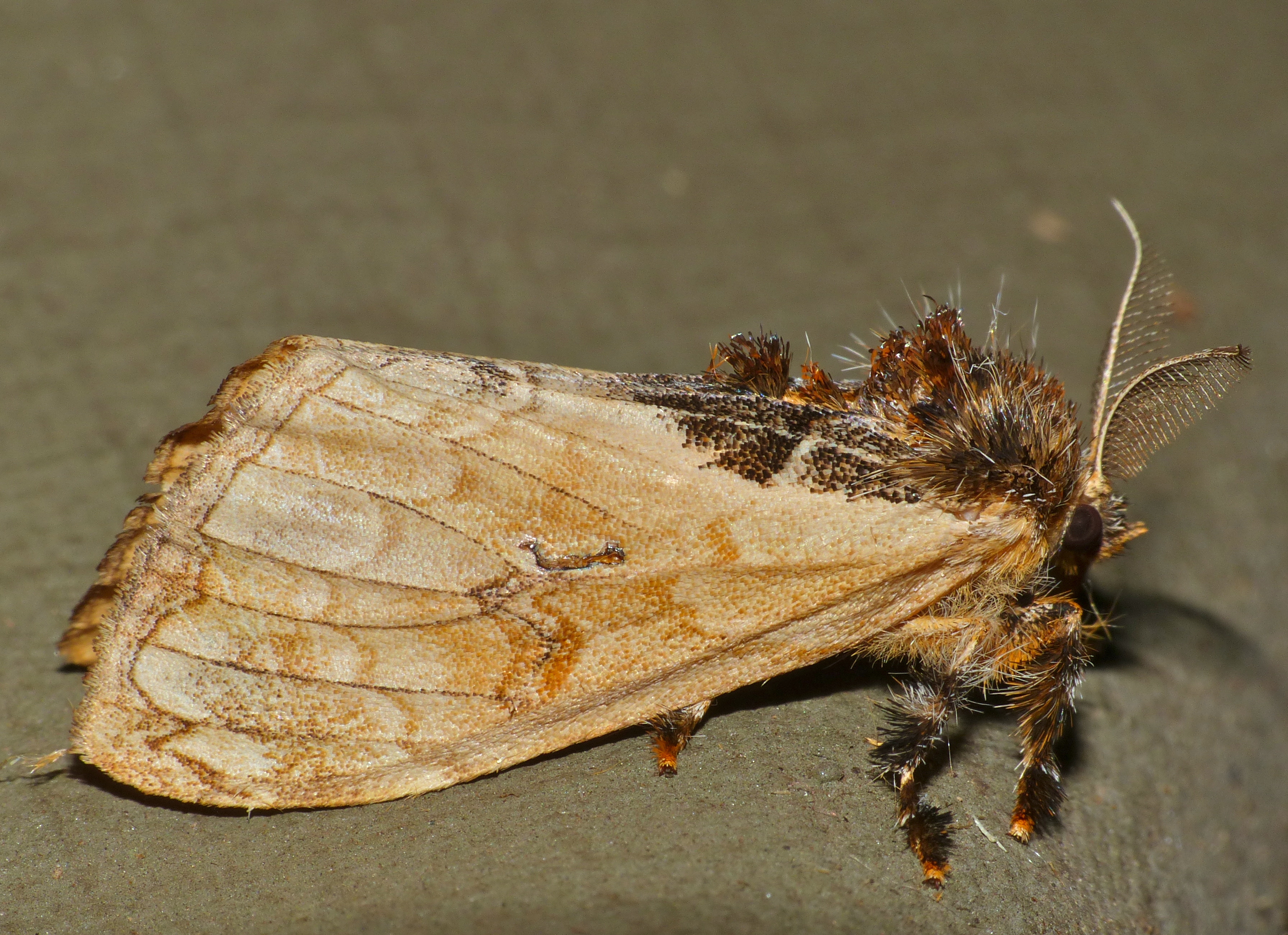
- Hemerophanes libyra

Scientific classification
- Domain: Eukaryota
- Kingdom: Animalia
- Phylum: Arthropoda
- Class: Insecta
- Order: Lepidoptera
- Superfamily: Noctuoidea
- Family: Erebidae
- Genus: Hemerophanes; Collenette, 1953

= Hemerophanes =

Genus of moths

Hemerophanes is a genus of moths in the subfamily Lymantriinae. The genus was erected by Cyril Leslie Collenette in 1953.

== Species ==
- Hemerophanes diatoma (Hering, 1926)
- Hemerophanes enos (H. Druce, 1896) southern Nigeria, western Africa
- Hemerophanes hypoxantha (Holland, 1893) western Africa
- Hemerophanes larvata (Schultze, 1934) north-western Congo
- Hemerophanes libyra (H. Druce, 1896) southern and eastern Africa
- Hemerophanes litigiosa (Hering, 1926) Tanzania
