= Halseyella =

Scientific classification
- Domain: Eukaryota
- Kingdom: Animalia
- Phylum: Arthropoda
- Class: Insecta
- Order: Lepidoptera
- Superfamily: Noctuoidea
- Family: Erebidae
- Tribe: Lymantriini
- Genus: Halseyella; Nye, 1980
- Species: H. flavicollis

Binomial name
- Halseyella flavicollis (Leech, 1890)

Synonyms
- Generic: Crinola Leech, 1890; Specific: Crinola flavicollis Leech, 1890; Aroa leucoides Strand, 1911

Genus of moths

Halseyella is a monotypic moth genus in the subfamily Lymantriinae described by Nye in 1980. Its only species, Halseyella flavicollis, was first described by John Henry Leech in 1890. It is found in the Chinese province of Hubei.
