= Homoeomeria (moth) =

Scientific classification
- Kingdom: Animalia
- Phylum: Arthropoda
- Class: Insecta
- Order: Lepidoptera
- Superfamily: Noctuoidea
- Family: Erebidae
- Tribe: Lymantriini
- Genus: Homoeomeria; Wallengren, 1865

Synonyms
- Homalomeria Strand, 1910; Redoa Swinhoe, 1922

Genus of moths

Homoeomeria is a genus of moths in the subfamily Lymantriinae. The genus was erected by Hans Daniel Johan Wallengren in 1865.

== Species ==
Some species of this genus are:

- Homoeomeria cretosa (Saalmüller, 1884)
- Homoeomeria euryptena Collenette, 1960
- Homoeomeria flavicapilla (Wallengren, 1860)
- Homoeomeria haploa Collenette, 1958
- Homoeomeria hololeuca (Hampson, 1910)
- Homoeomeria hypsoides Collenette, 1960
- Homoeomeria iroceraea (Collenette, 1959)
- Homoeomeria nivea Aurivillius, 1909
