= Sychnacedes =

Scientific classification
- Domain: Eukaryota
- Kingdom: Animalia
- Phylum: Arthropoda
- Class: Insecta
- Order: Lepidoptera
- Superfamily: Noctuoidea
- Family: Erebidae
- Tribe: Lymantriini
- Genus: Sychnacedes; Collenette, 1953

Synonyms
- Homaroa Collenette, 1956

Genus of moths

Sychnacedes is a genus of moths in the subfamily Lymantriinae. The genus was erected by Cyril Leslie Collenette in 1953.

== Species ==
- Sychnacedes epiclithra (Collenette, 1956)
- Sychnacedes idiopis Collenette, 1953
- Sychnacedes perroti (Oberthür, 1922)
