= Vetusta =

Vetusta might refer to:

- Vetusta (city), fictional setting for La regenta and based on Oviedo
- Vetusta Morla, Spanish rock band
- Vetusta Monumenta, antiquarian papers
- Vetusta Placita, ancient philosophy
- Real Oviedo Vetusta, Spanish football club
- A number of insects, including:
  - Agrotis vetusta
  - Anaxita vetusta
  - Autochloris vetusta
  - Collita vetusta
  - Euphaedra vetusta
  - Euxoa vetusta
  - Lepidophora vetusta
  - Orgyia vetusta
  - Porela vetusta
  - Rosenbergia vetusta
  - Symmoca vetusta
  - Xylena vetusta
- A number of albums by French metal band Blut Aus Nord:
  - Memoria Vetusta I – Fathers of the Icy Age
  - Memoria Vetusta II – Dialogue with the Stars
  - Memoria Vetusta III: Saturnian Poetry
