= A. elegantissima =

A. elegantissima may refer to:

- Alvania elegantissima, a sea snail species
- Anthopleura elegantissima, the aggregating anemone or clonal anemone, a sea anemone species found along the shores of the Pacific coast of North America
- Asperdaphne elegantissima, a sea snail species

== Synonyms ==
- Anaxita elegantissima, a synonym for Anaxita decorata, the decorated beauty, a moth species found in Mexico and Central America
