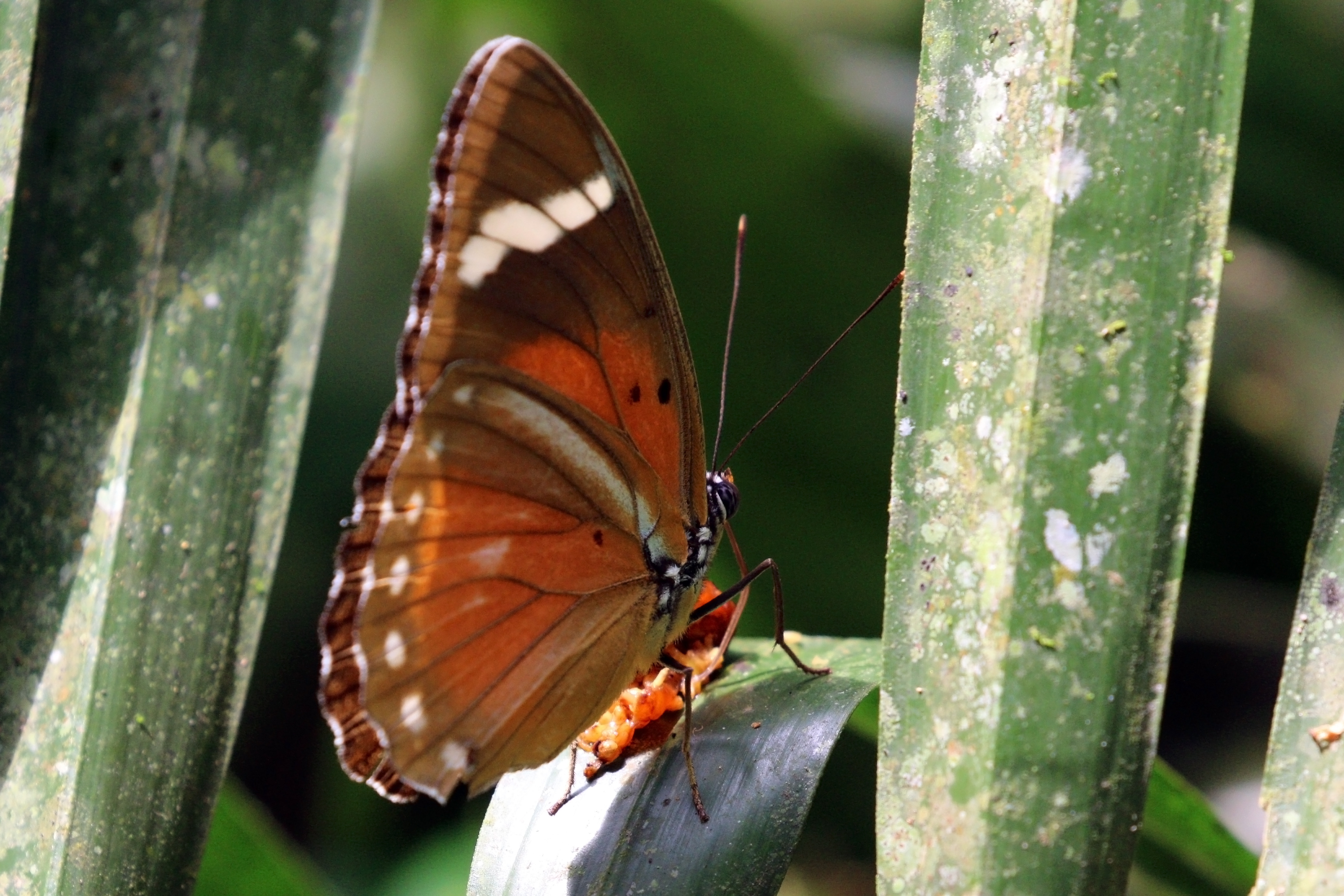
- Kibale National Park, Uganda

Scientific classification
- Kingdom: Animalia
- Phylum: Arthropoda
- Class: Insecta
- Order: Lepidoptera
- Family: Nymphalidae
- Genus: Euphaedra
- Species: E. eberti

Binomial name
- Euphaedra eberti Aurivillius, 1896

Synonyms
- Euphaedra (Euphaedrana) eberti; Euphaedra eberti ab. rubromaculata Schultze, 1920; Euphaedra hamus Berger, 1940

= Euphaedra eberti =

Species of butterfly

Euphaedra eberti is a butterfly in the family Nymphalidae. It is found in the Democratic Republic of the Congo, the Central African Republic and Uganda.

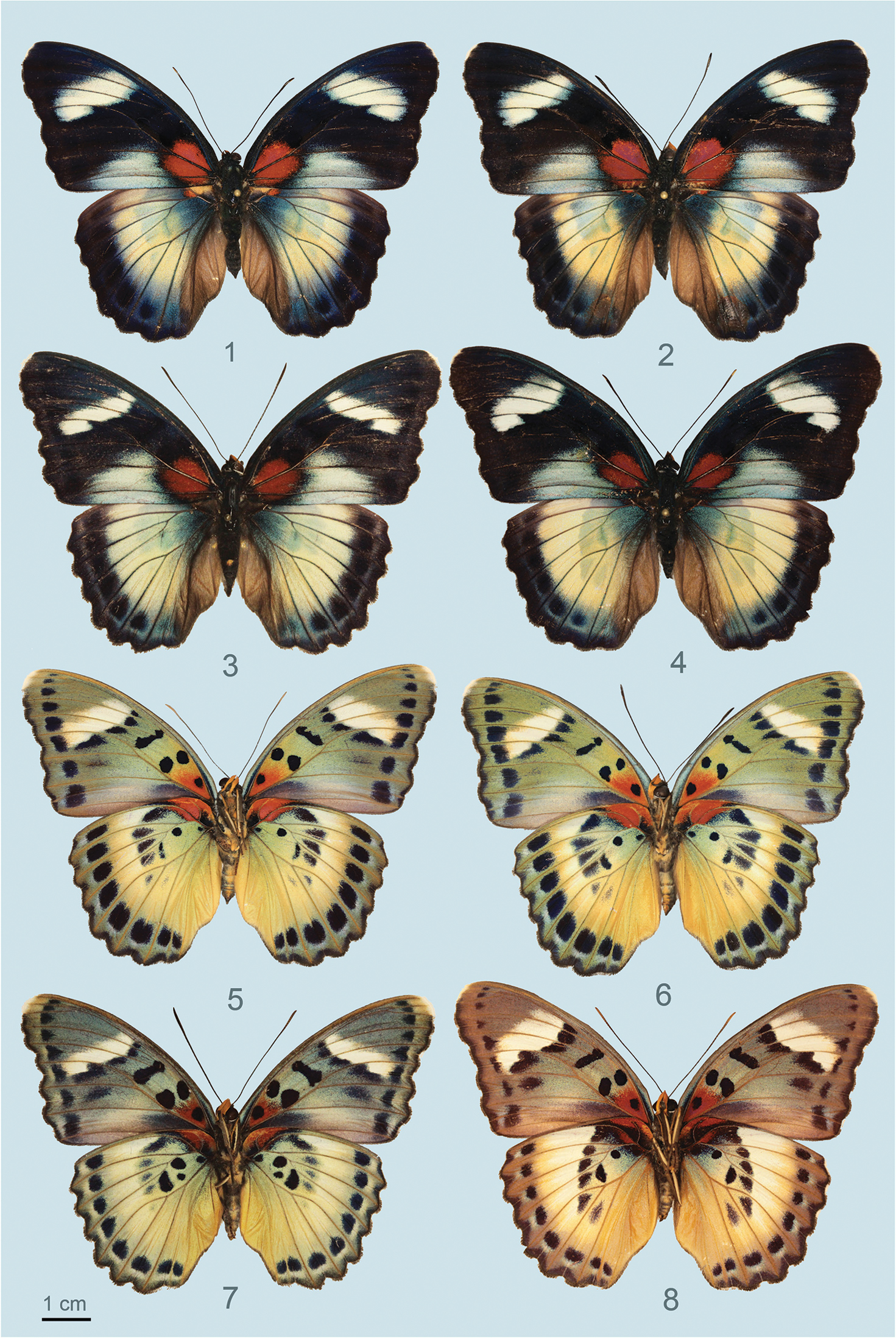
Euphaedra eberti females various forms

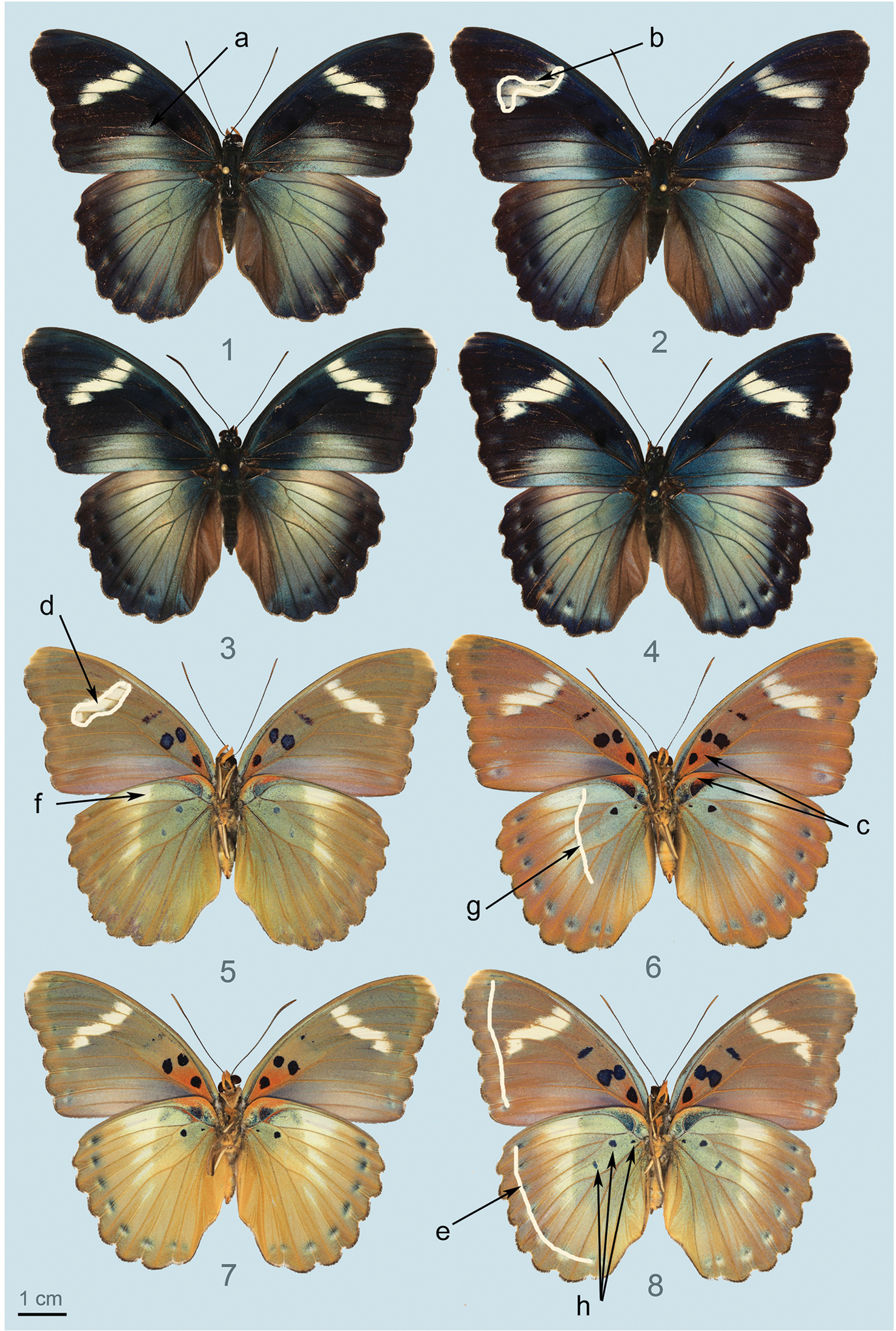
Euphaedra eberti males various forms

== Description ==
E. eberti Auriv. (44 d) is perhaps only an extreme form of themis, with which it is connected to some extent by niveovittata; on the other hand it approximates closely to the forms sarita and inanum, scarcely differing from them except in the reddish spot at the base of the costal margin on the underside of the hindwing. Both wings beneath without black discal spots and with indistinct or greenish, small submarginal spots; the subapical band of the forewing is in the entirely absent on both surfaces or is white, as in the female: the male the forewing above is marked quite as in sarita (44 c), with green or blue spots on the fore wing which are not sharply defined; the under surface has distinct black spots in the cells and often also at the base of cellule 8 on the hindwing and in the male a brown-yellow ground-colour, which is only in the cell and in cellule 7 of the hindwing more or less tinged with bluish; in the female the under surface is darker, grey-brown, but often broadly suffused with light bluish in the basal part of both wings; the hindwing wing has usually a broad white median band between vein 3 and the costal margin.

== Subspecies ==
- Euphaedra eberti eberti (northern Democratic Republic of the Congo, Central African Republic)
- Euphaedra eberti hamus Berger, 1940 (eastern Democratic Republic of the Congo, Uganda: Semuliki National Park, Rwenzori)
