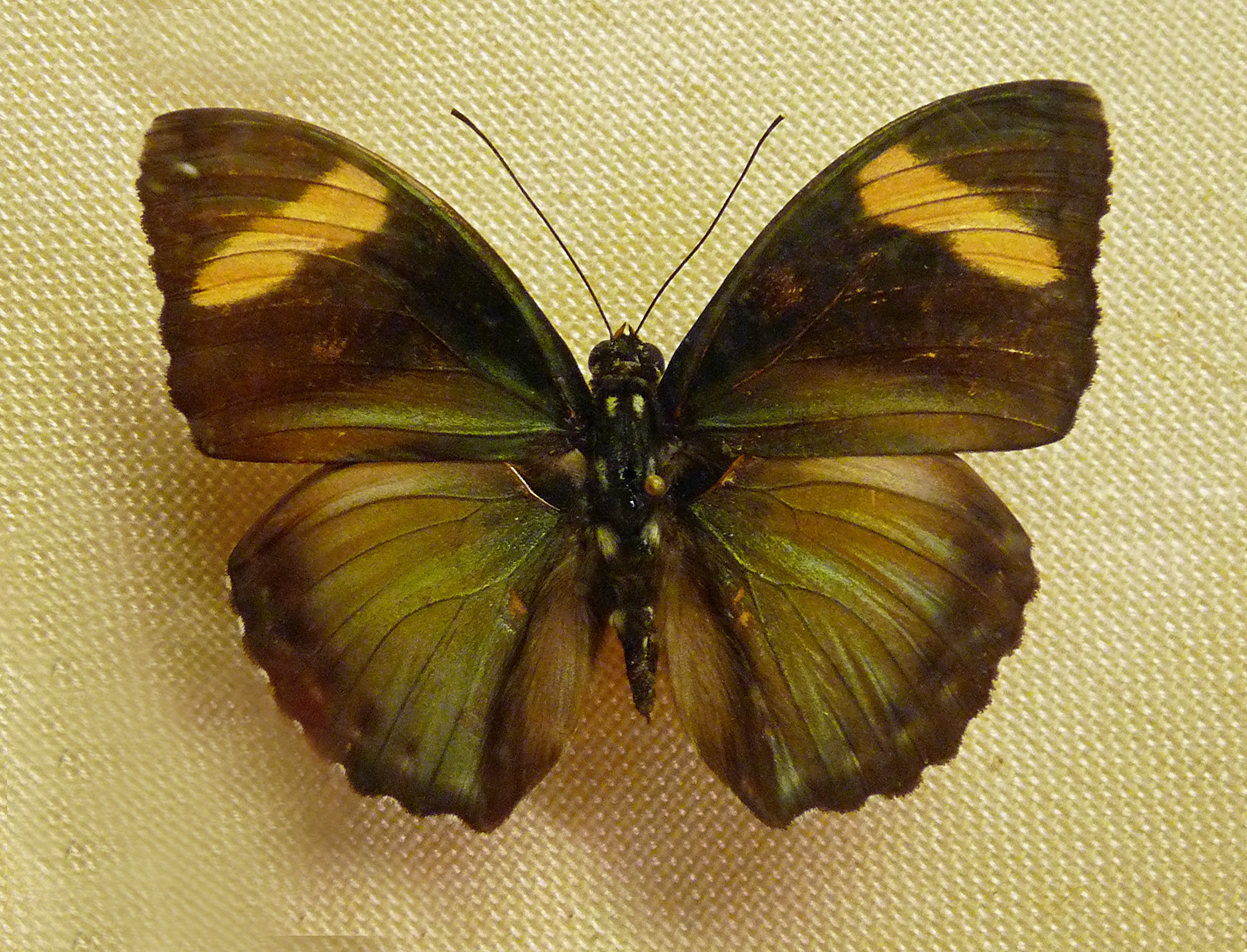

Scientific classification
- Kingdom: Animalia
- Phylum: Arthropoda
- Class: Insecta
- Order: Lepidoptera
- Family: Nymphalidae
- Genus: Euphaedra
- Species: E. justicia

Binomial name
- Euphaedra justicia Staudinger, 1886

Synonyms
- Euphaedra themis var. justicia Staudinger, 1886; Euphaedra (Euphaedrana) justicia; Euphaedra themis var. auretta Gaede, 1916

= Euphaedra justicia =

Species of butterfly

Euphaedra justicia, the Justicia Themis forester, is a butterfly in the family Nymphalidae. It is found in Nigeria, Cameroon, Gabon and the Democratic Republic of the Congo.

== Similar species ==
Other members of themis species group q.v. b. justitia Stgr. only differs from permixta in having the yellow subapical band of the forewing very broad and rounded. Lagos to Gabon.
