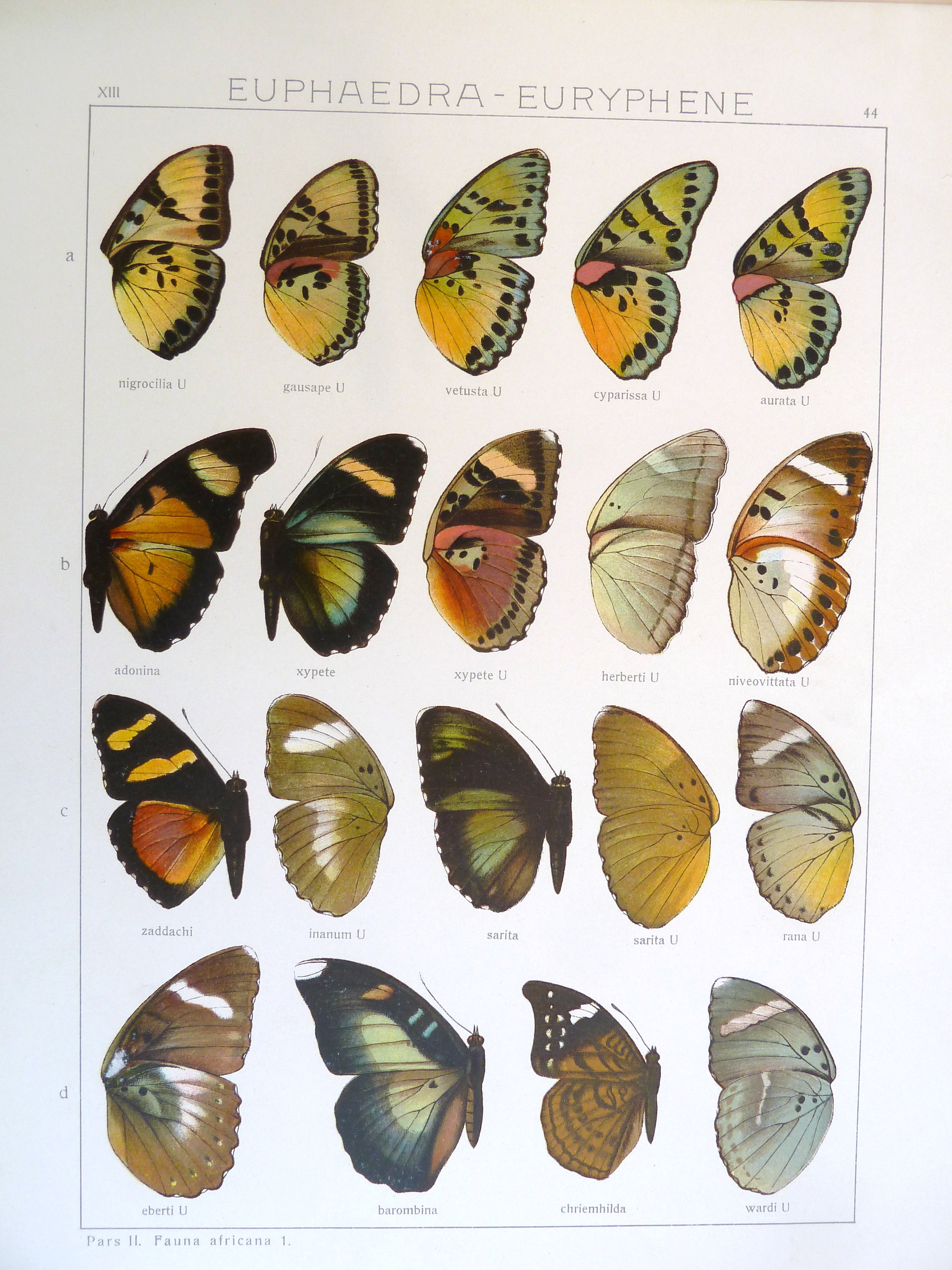
- In Adalbert Seitz's Fauna Africana

Scientific classification
- Kingdom: Animalia
- Phylum: Arthropoda
- Class: Insecta
- Order: Lepidoptera
- Family: Nymphalidae
- Genus: Euphaedra
- Species: E. herberti

Binomial name
- Euphaedra herberti (Sharpe, 1891)

Synonyms
- Romaleosoma herberti Sharpe, 1891; Euphaedra (Xypetana) herberti; Euphaedra acrozaleuca Karsch, 1895; Euphaedra herberti herberti f. bacchabunda Hecq, 1996

= Euphaedra herberti =

Species of butterfly

Euphaedra herberti is a butterfly in the family Nymphalidae. It is found in the Democratic Republic of the Congo and Zambia.

== Description ==
E. herberti E. Sharpe (44 b) is a very distinct species. The submarginal spots of both wings are small, placed further (5-6 mm.) from the distal margin and united into a continuous line above; the white apical spot of the fore wing is very large; the subapical band in the male narrow, yellowish and little distinct, in the female broader and whitish and the upper surface entirely or for the most part lighter green, grey-green or yellowish green. The under surface differs from all the other forms of the subgroup in the weak development of the black markings; the dots in the cell are small or entirely absent, as are also the black discal spots; the subapical band of the forewing is only indicated and the submarginal spots, although distinct, are small and not deep black; the red costal band of the hindwing is not very sharply marked, is bounded before the middle by the black-edged vein 8, but at and behind the middle is extended and covers a part of cellule 7 (in the figure this is unfortunately too weakly indicated); the ground-colour of the under surface is light bluish green and at the distal margin more or less darkened. In the weakness of the markings on the under surface this species corresponds to such forms as eberti and sarita in the other two subgroups. Congo, rare.

== Subspecies ==
- Euphaedra herberti herberti (Democratic Republic of the Congo)
- Euphaedra herberti katanga Hecq, 1980 (Democratic Republic of the Congo: Shaba, Zambia)

It is a rare species.
