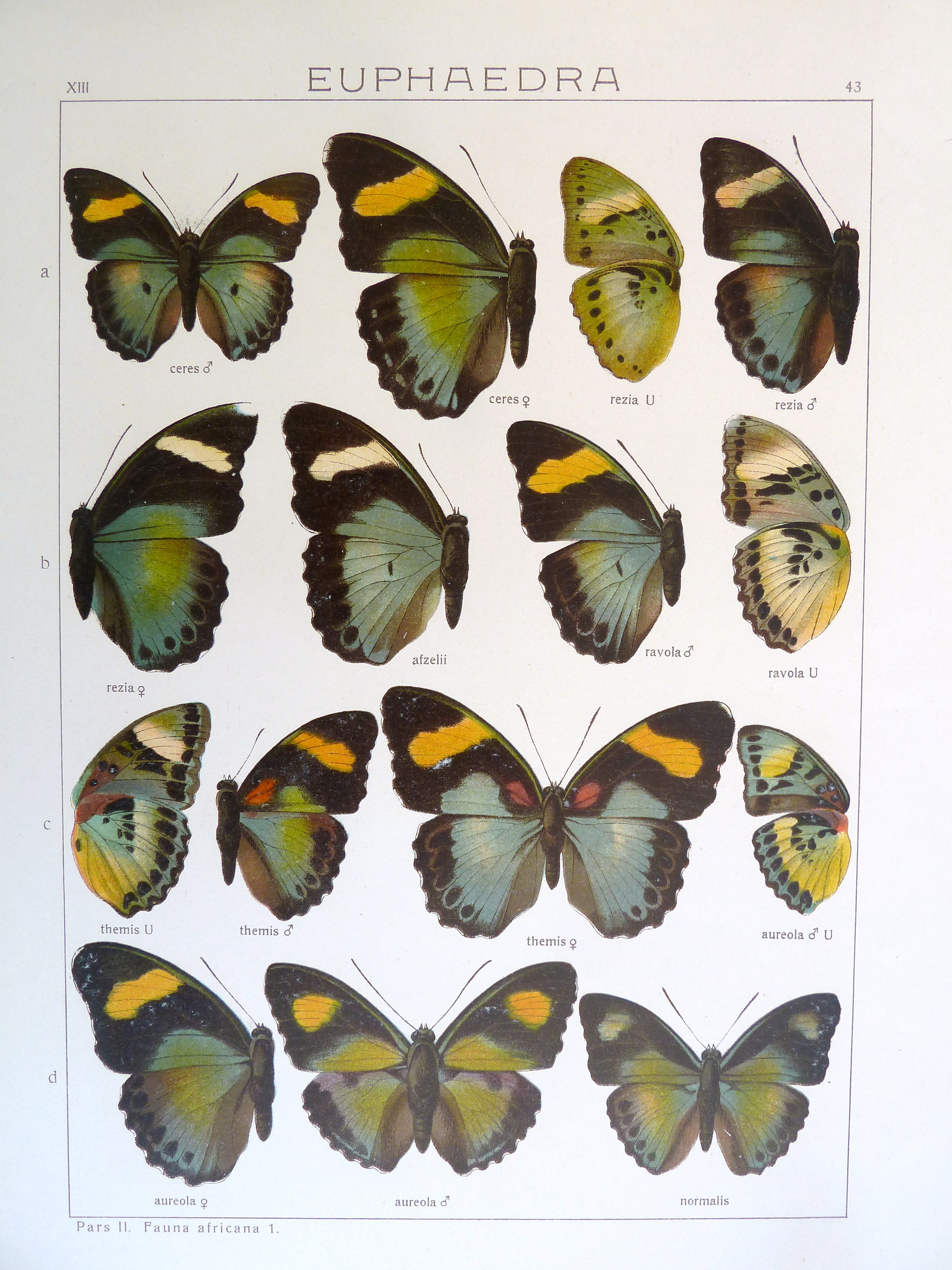
- In Adalbert Seitz's Fauna Africana

Scientific classification
- Kingdom: Animalia
- Phylum: Arthropoda
- Class: Insecta
- Order: Lepidoptera
- Family: Nymphalidae
- Genus: Euphaedra
- Species: E. afzelii

Binomial name
- Euphaedra afzelii (Felder & Felder, 1867)

Synonyms
- Romalaeosoma afzelii Felder & Felder, 1867; Euphaedra (Euphaedrana) afzelii

= Euphaedra afzelii =

Species of butterfly

Euphaedra afzelii, the green Ceres forester, is a butterfly in the family Nymphalidae. It is found in Sierra Leone. The habitat consists of dense forests.

== Similar species ==
Other members of the Euphaedra ceres species group q.v. - ab. afzelii Fldr. (43 b) Hindwing beneath without white median band; the subapical band of the fore wing in the male green, beneath light green and indistinct, in the female greenish or white; the under surface with bright green ground-colour, only at the inner margin of the hindwing somewhat yellowish; fringes black. The male fully corresponds to the form vetusta of themis. Sierra Leone.
