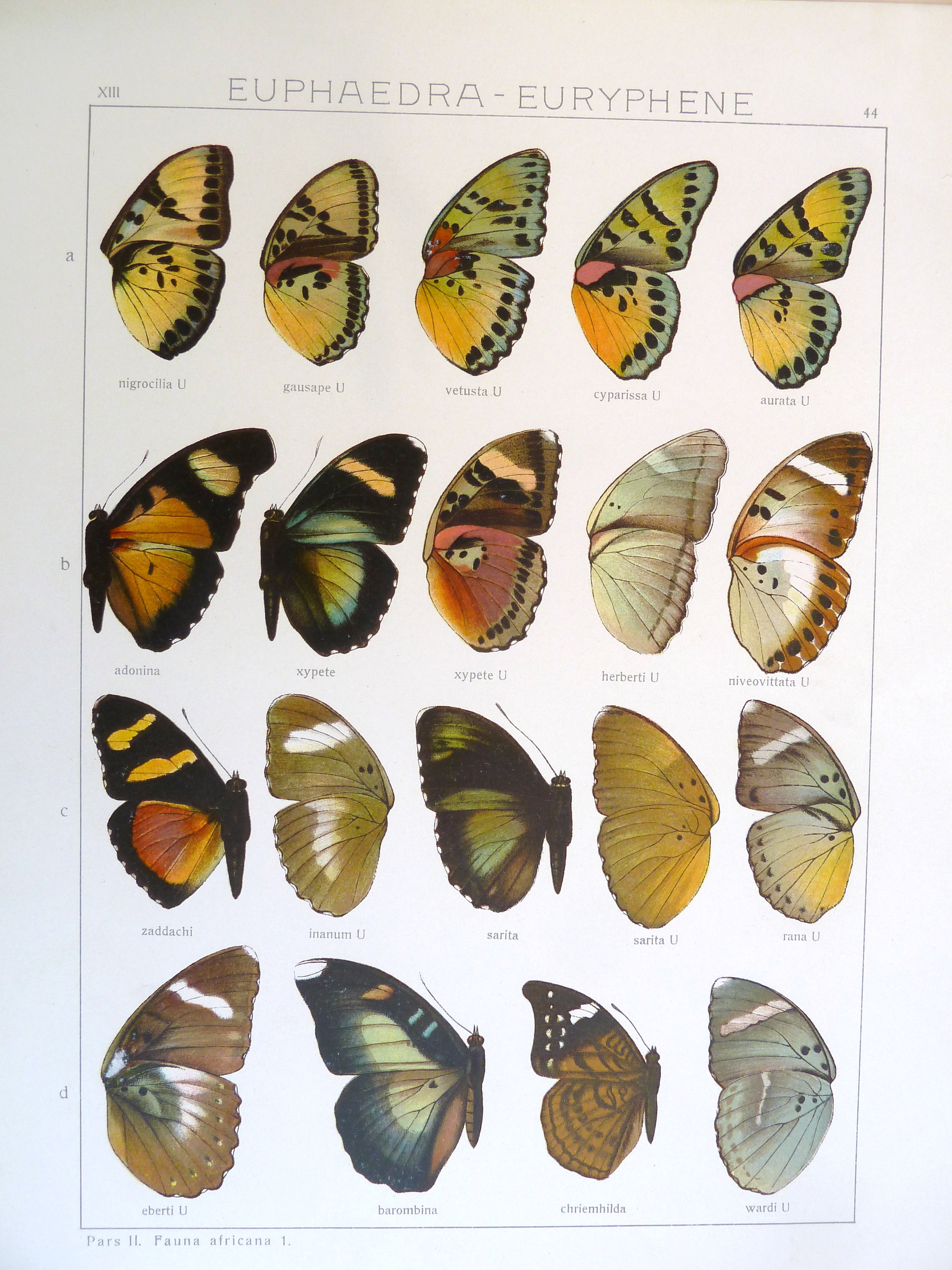
- In Adalbert Seitz's Fauna Africana

Scientific classification
- Kingdom: Animalia
- Phylum: Arthropoda
- Clade: Pancrustacea
- Class: Insecta
- Order: Lepidoptera
- Family: Nymphalidae
- Genus: Euphaedra
- Species: E. gausape

Binomial name
- Euphaedra gausape (Butler, 1866)

Synonyms
- Romaleosoma gausape Butler, 1866; Euphaedra (Gausapia) gausape; Euphaedra gausape f. similis Hecq, 2004

= Euphaedra gausape =

Species of butterfly

Euphaedra gausape, the western striped forester, is a butterfly in the family Nymphalidae. It is found in Guinea, Sierra Leone, Liberia, Ivory Coast and Ghana.

== Description ==
E. gausape differs at once from herberti in the entire absence of the white apical spot on the forewing (only the fringes are occasionally white), while the red costal band of the hindwing is very broad and covers cellule 7 from the base onwards and often also cellule 6 as far as the often simple deep black submarginal spots; no black spot at the base of cellule 7 on the hindwing beneath. - gausape Btlr. Forewing black above with broad yellow subapical band and broad golden-green hindmarginal spot; hindwing above golden green with broad black marginal band; the under surface yellowish green with black spots in the cells, black discal spots in cellules 2-6, black submarginal spots and black hindmargin on the forewing; hindwing in the middle broadly yellow, only in the cell and at the distal margin green or bluish. Ashanti to Cameroons. ab. extensa Bartel [now Euphaedra extensa Hecq, 1981] only differs in having the yellow subapical band of the forewing even broader and the green . parts of the upper surface more suffused with yellow. Cameroons.

Torben Larsen developed a species numbering system for his 2005 publication Butterflies of West Africa. This species is #1047. The 'Larsen' numbers have since been used with permission in A Sharp Eye on Butterflies of Ghana.

== Biology ==
The habitat consists of forests.

Adults feed on fallen fruit.
