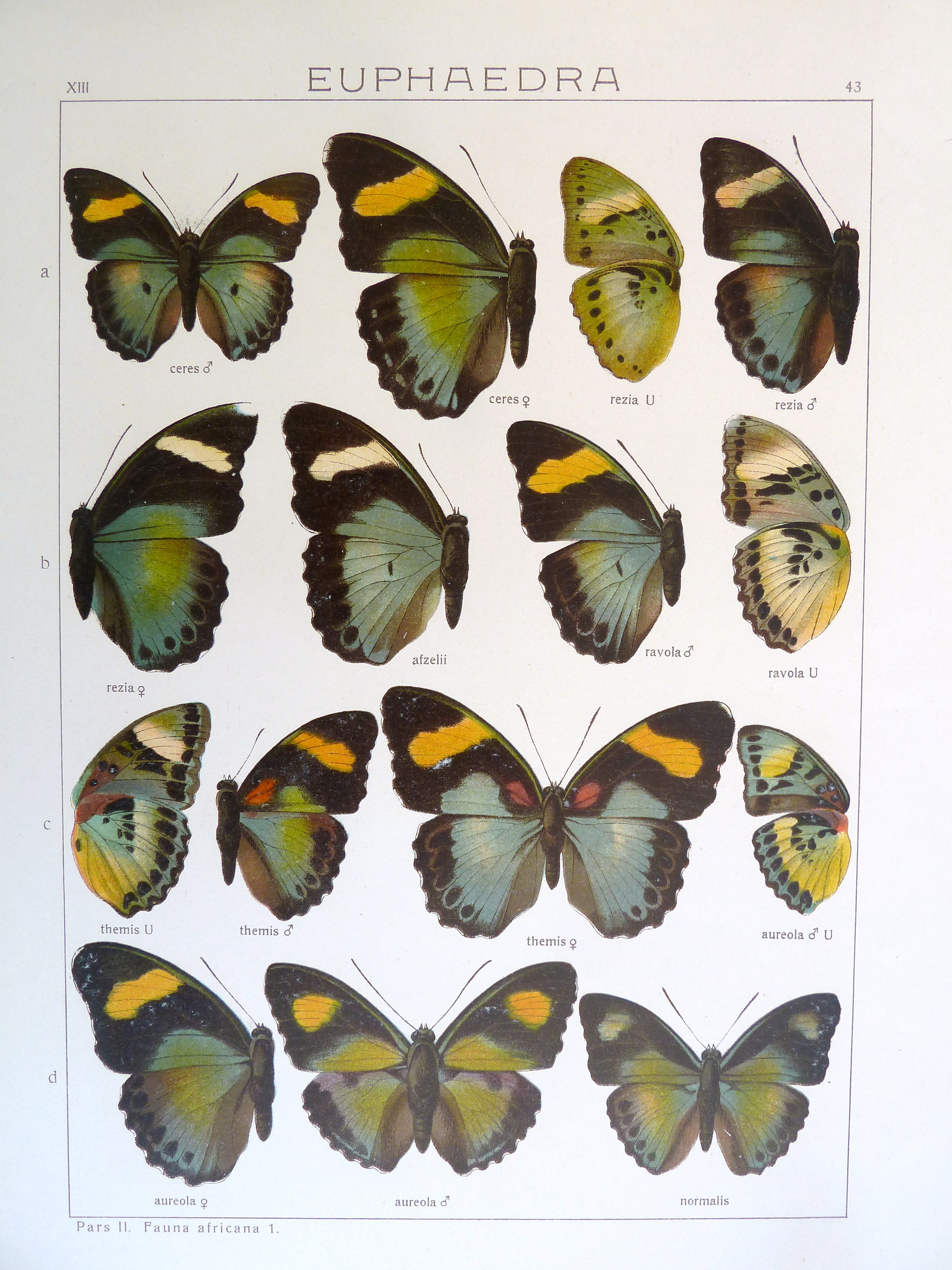
- In Adalbert Seitz's Fauna Africana

Scientific classification
- Kingdom: Animalia
- Phylum: Arthropoda
- Class: Insecta
- Order: Lepidoptera
- Family: Nymphalidae
- Genus: Euphaedra
- Species: E. aureola

Binomial name
- Euphaedra aureola Kirby, 1889

Synonyms
- Euphaedra (Euphaedrana) aureola; Euphaedra auriger Staudinger, 1891; Euphaedra auriger ab. janettoides Strand, 1914; Euphaedra auriger ab. griseoviridis Schultze, 1920

= Euphaedra aureola =

Species of butterfly

Euphaedra aureola, the long-banded Themis forester, is a butterfly in the family Nymphalidae. It is found in Nigeria, Cameroon and the Republic of the Congo. The habitat consists of wetter forests.

== Description ==
ab. aureola Kirby (43 c, d) of themis is also near to janetta, but the red spot at the base of the under surface is not violet-red but brick-red.

== Biology ==
Adults are attracted to fallen fruit.

The larvae feed on Octolobus species.

== Subspecies ==
- Euphaedra aureola aureola (Cameroon, Congo)
- Euphaedra aureola nitens Hecq, 1997 (southern Nigeria)

== Similar species ==
Other members of themis species group q.v.
