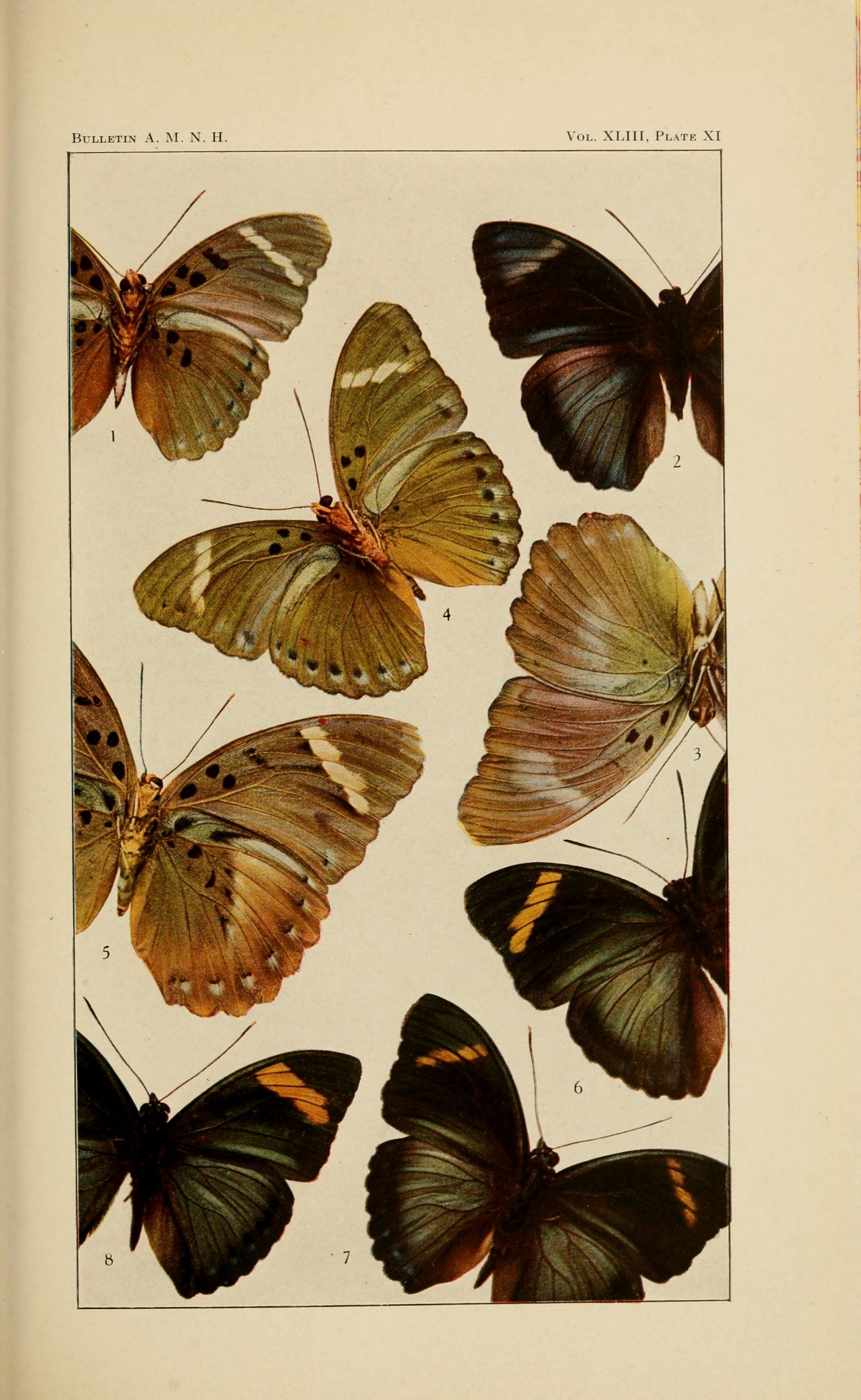
- Figure 5

Scientific classification
- Domain: Eukaryota
- Kingdom: Animalia
- Phylum: Arthropoda
- Class: Insecta
- Order: Lepidoptera
- Family: Nymphalidae
- Genus: Euphaedra
- Species: E. cottoni

Binomial name
- Euphaedra cottoni Sharpe, 1907

Synonyms
- Euphaedra (Euphaedrana) cottoni; Euphaedra rezioides Holland, 1920

= Euphaedra cottoni =

Species of butterfly

Euphaedra cottoni is a butterfly in the family Nymphalidae. It is found in Cameroon and the eastern part of the Democratic Republic of the Congo.

== Similar species ==
Other members of the Euphaedra ceres species group q.v. ab. cottoni E. Sharpe apparently only differs from Euphaedra rezia in having the yellow subapical band of the forewing broken up into spots. Ituri
