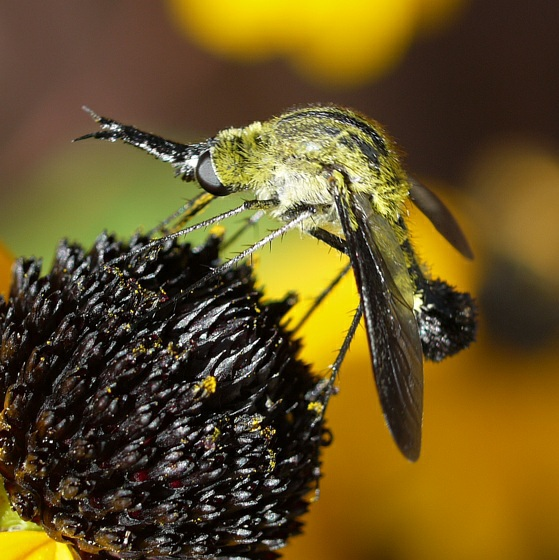

Scientific classification
- Domain: Eukaryota
- Kingdom: Animalia
- Phylum: Arthropoda
- Class: Insecta
- Order: Diptera
- Family: Bombyliidae
- Genus: Lepidophora
- Species: L. lutea

Binomial name
- Lepidophora lutea Painter, 1962

= Lepidophora lutea =

Species of fly

Lepidophora lutea is a species of bee fly in the family Bombyliidae. It is found in Ontario and the eastern United States, from Maine and Florida west to Minnesota and Louisiana.
