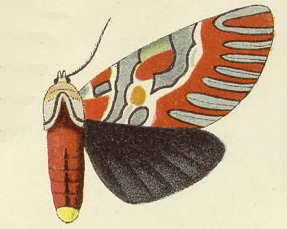

Scientific classification
- Kingdom: Animalia
- Phylum: Arthropoda
- Clade: Pancrustacea
- Class: Insecta
- Order: Lepidoptera
- Superfamily: Noctuoidea
- Family: Erebidae
- Subfamily: Arctiinae
- Genus: Anaxita
- Species: A. drucei

Binomial name
- Anaxita drucei Rodriguez, 1893

= Anaxita drucei =

Species of moth

Anaxita drucei is a moth of the family Erebidae. It is found in Guatemala.

== Subspecies ==
- Anaxita drucei drucei (Guatemala)
- Anaxita drucei brueckneri Seitz, 1925 (Guatemala)
