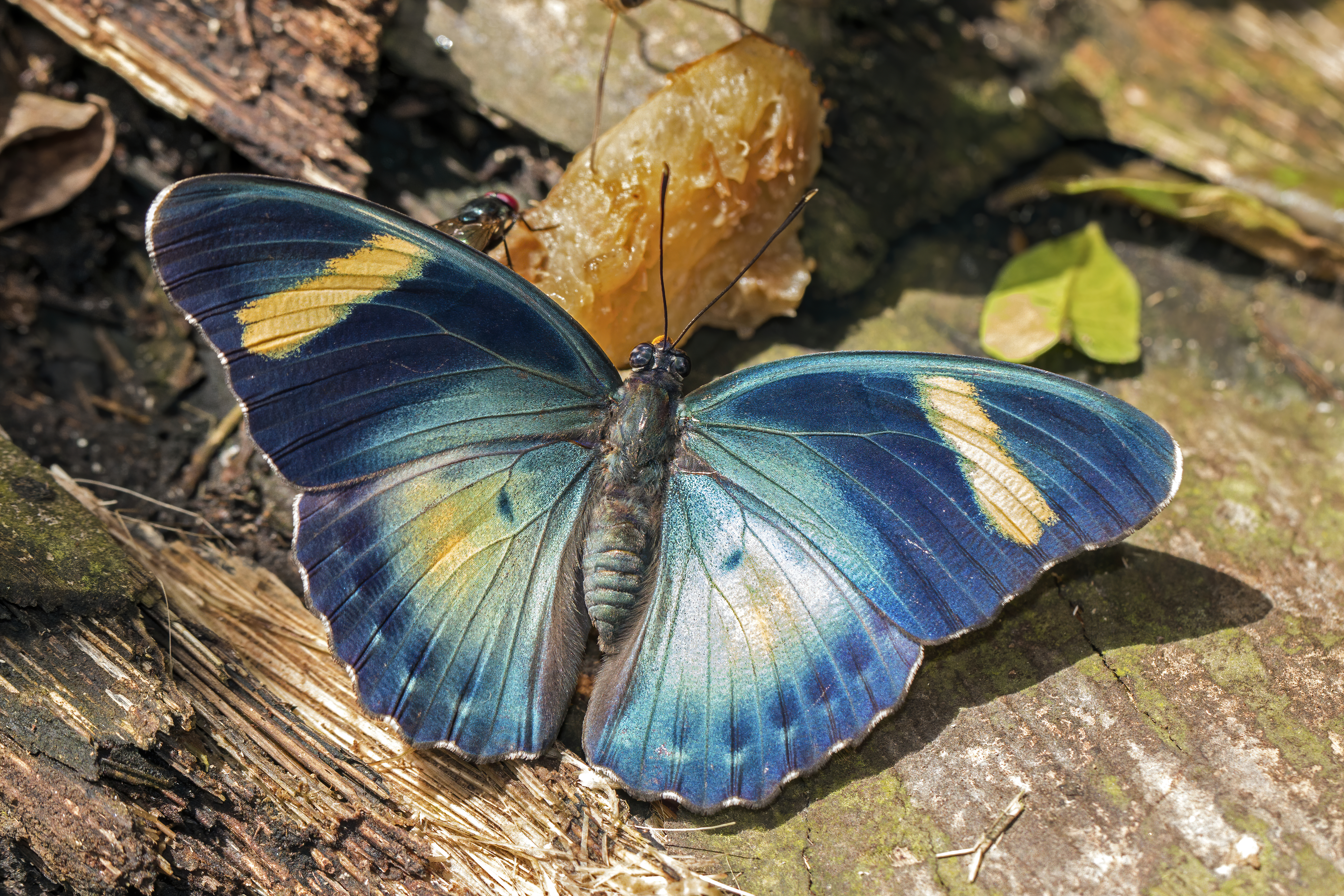

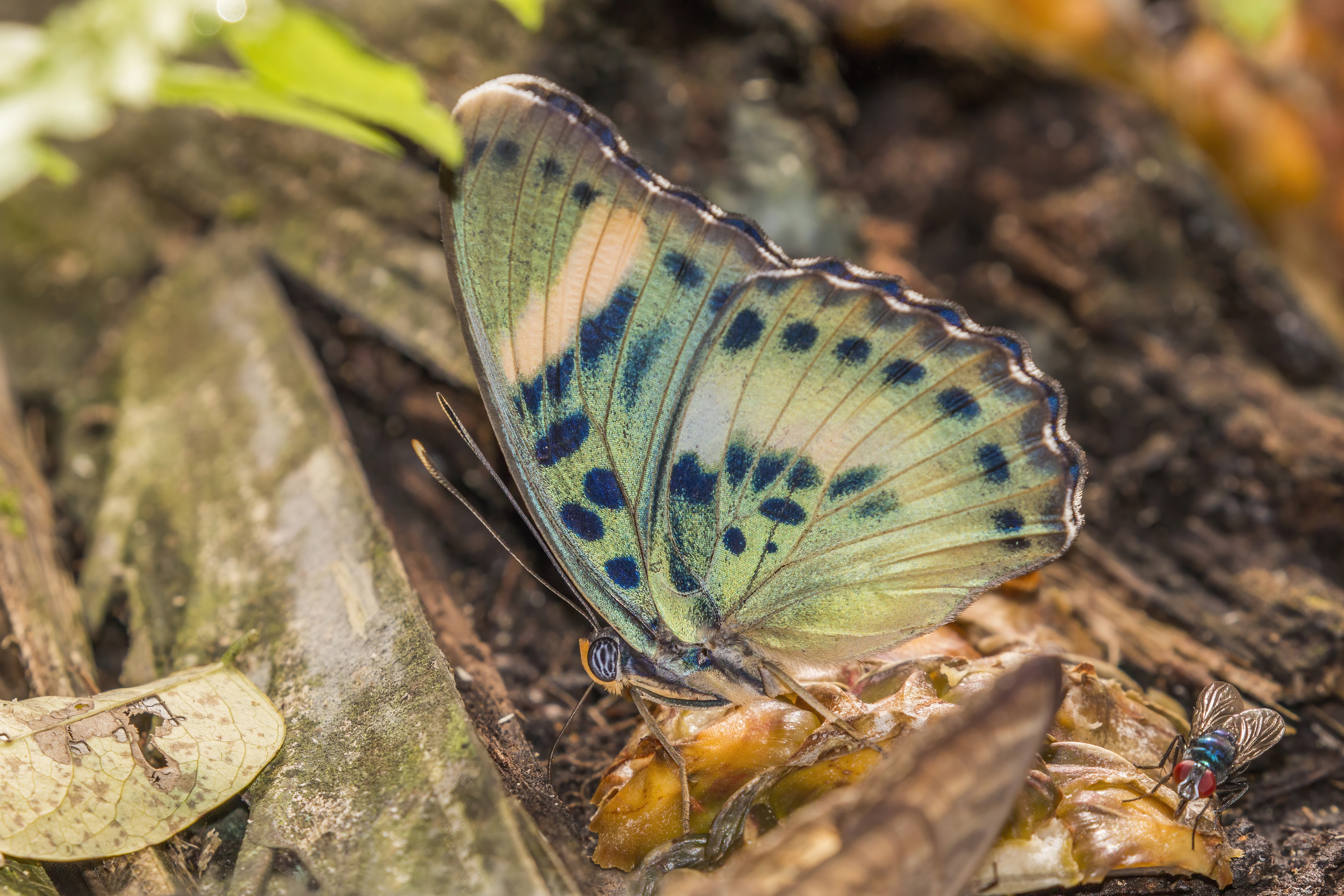
- Both E. p. phaethusa male, Ghana

Scientific classification
- Kingdom: Animalia
- Phylum: Arthropoda
- Clade: Pancrustacea
- Class: Insecta
- Order: Lepidoptera
- Family: Nymphalidae
- Genus: Euphaedra
- Species: E. phaethusa

Binomial name
- Euphaedra phaethusa (Butler, 1866)

Synonyms
- Romaleosoma phaethusa Butler, 1866; Euphaedra (Euphaedrana) phaethusa; Euphaedra artynta Möschler, 1887; Euphaedra vespasia Möschler, 1887; Euphaedra adelica Bartel, 1905; Euphaedra inanum f. ceroides Hecq, 1979; Euphaedra ceroides Hecq, 1983; Euphaedra scrupulosa Hecq, 1997; Euphaedra ceroides aurea Hecq, 1983; Euphaedra ceres ab. aurea Neustetter, 1927

= Euphaedra phaethusa =

Species of butterfly

Euphaedra phaethusa, the Common ceres forester, is a butterfly in the Nymphalidae family. It is found in Guinea, Sierra Leone, Liberia, Ivory Coast, Ghana, Togo, Benin and possibly Nigeria. The habitat consists of forests. It is a common species.

The larvae feed on Blighia sapida.

== Subspecies ==
- Euphaedra phaethusa phaethusa (Ivory Coast, Ghana, Togo, Benin, Nigeria). There is also a form ceroides.
- Euphaedra phaethusa aurea Hecq, 1983 (Guinea, Sierra Leone, western Liberia)

Torben Larsen developed a species numbering system for his 2005 publication Butterflies of West Africa. The nominate subspecies is #1085. The 'Larsen' numbers have since been used with permission in A Sharp Eye on Butterflies of Ghana.

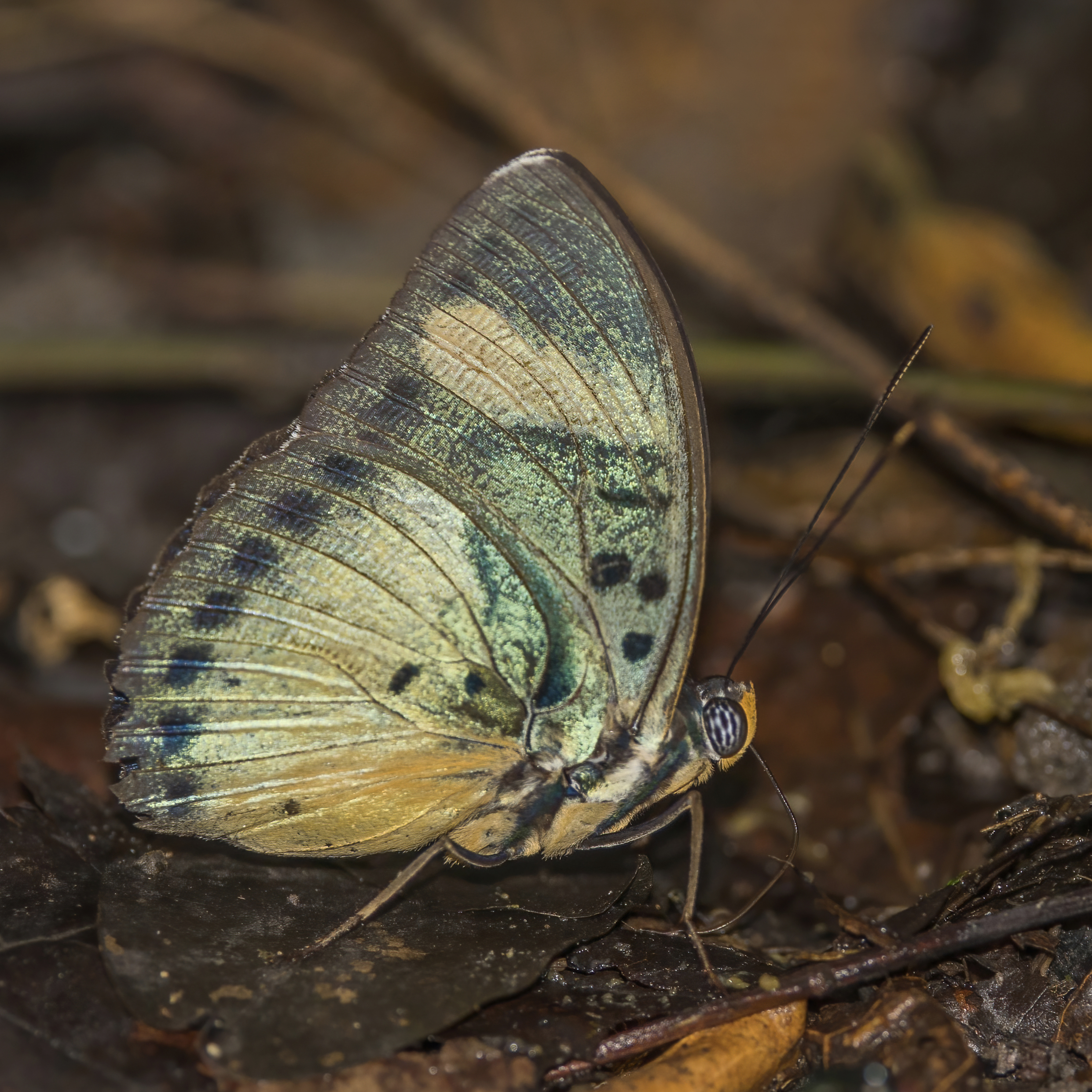
female E. p. phaetusa, Ghana

male E. p. ceroides, Ghana

male E. p. ceroides, Ghana

== Similar species ==
Other members of the Euphaedra ceres species group q.v. - ab. phaethusa Btlr. differs from all the preceding forms in having the submarginal spots on the under surface entirely absent or only indicated; the black discal spots on the contrary are present and the hindwing has a whitish median band; the subapical band of the forewing is light yellow or greenish white so inadequately described that I cannot identify it. The description runs: Most resembles ceres; the band of the fore wing is, however, not whitish but yellow and its shape is different; it runs from the costal margin obliquely towards the distal margin as far as cellule 4, in the middle of which its outer edge forms an obtuse angle directed towards the distal margin, whilst in ceres the band is regular; the colouring of the hindwing is of a duller green than in ceres; there is no trace of the whitish band at the costal margin which occurs in ceres; the deep black transverse spot on the transverse vein is likewise either entirely absent or only shows through faintly from the under surface; before the distal margin is placed a row of blue-green spots. The ground-colour of the under surface is a more or less dull olive-brown; the first black spot in the median band (at the costal margin) is much shorter and narrower than in ceres and projects much less basewards beyond the band; also the other spots of the band are much smaller than in that species; in the cell are placed 1 or 2 round black spots; behind the cell runs as far as cellule 2 a broad, sharply defined, white, bluish-tinged band, which in ceres is narrower and not sharply defined; the black spots before the distal margin are smaller than in ceres and the black crescentic marginal spots are entirely absent; apex narrowly white; fringes white-spotted. Ashanti.
