= Euphaedra campaspe =

Scientific classification
- Kingdom: Animalia
- Phylum: Arthropoda
- Class: Insecta
- Order: Lepidoptera
- Family: Nymphalidae
- Genus: Euphaedra
- Species: E. campaspe

Binomial name
- Euphaedra campaspe (Felder & Felder, 1867)

Synonyms
- Romalaeosoma campaspe Felder & Felder, 1867; Euphaedra (Euphaedrana) campaspe

Species of butterfly

Euphaedra campaspe is a butterfly in the family Nymphalidae. It is found in Gabon, the Republic of the Congo, the Central African Republic and the Democratic Republic of the Congo.

== Description ==
ab. campaspe Fldr. The subapical band of the forewing beneath distinct and white, above in the male green, in the female white; the discal spots of the under surface black and distinct; on the upper surface the hindmarginal spot of the forewing and the basal part of the hindwing are dark green in the male, light green to greenish white in the female; the forewing above without red, but beneath red in the basal half of the cell. Gaboon, Congo, Angola.

== Subspecies ==
- Euphaedra campaspe campaspe (Gabon, Congo, Central African Republic)
- Euphaedra campaspe permixtoides Hecq, 1986 (Democratic Republic of the Congo)

== Similar species ==
Other members of themis species group q.v.
