= Anaxita sophia =

Scientific classification
- Domain: Eukaryota
- Kingdom: Animalia
- Phylum: Arthropoda
- Class: Insecta
- Order: Lepidoptera
- Superfamily: Noctuoidea
- Family: Erebidae
- Subfamily: Arctiinae
- Genus: Anaxita
- Species: A. sophia

Binomial name
- Anaxita sophia Dognin, 1901

Synonyms
- Halesidota rubrosignata Weymer, 1907; Calidota rubrosignata (Weymer, 1907); Anaxita rubrosignata (Weymer, 1907)

Species of moth

Anaxita sophia is a moth of the family Erebidae. It is found in Venezuela.
