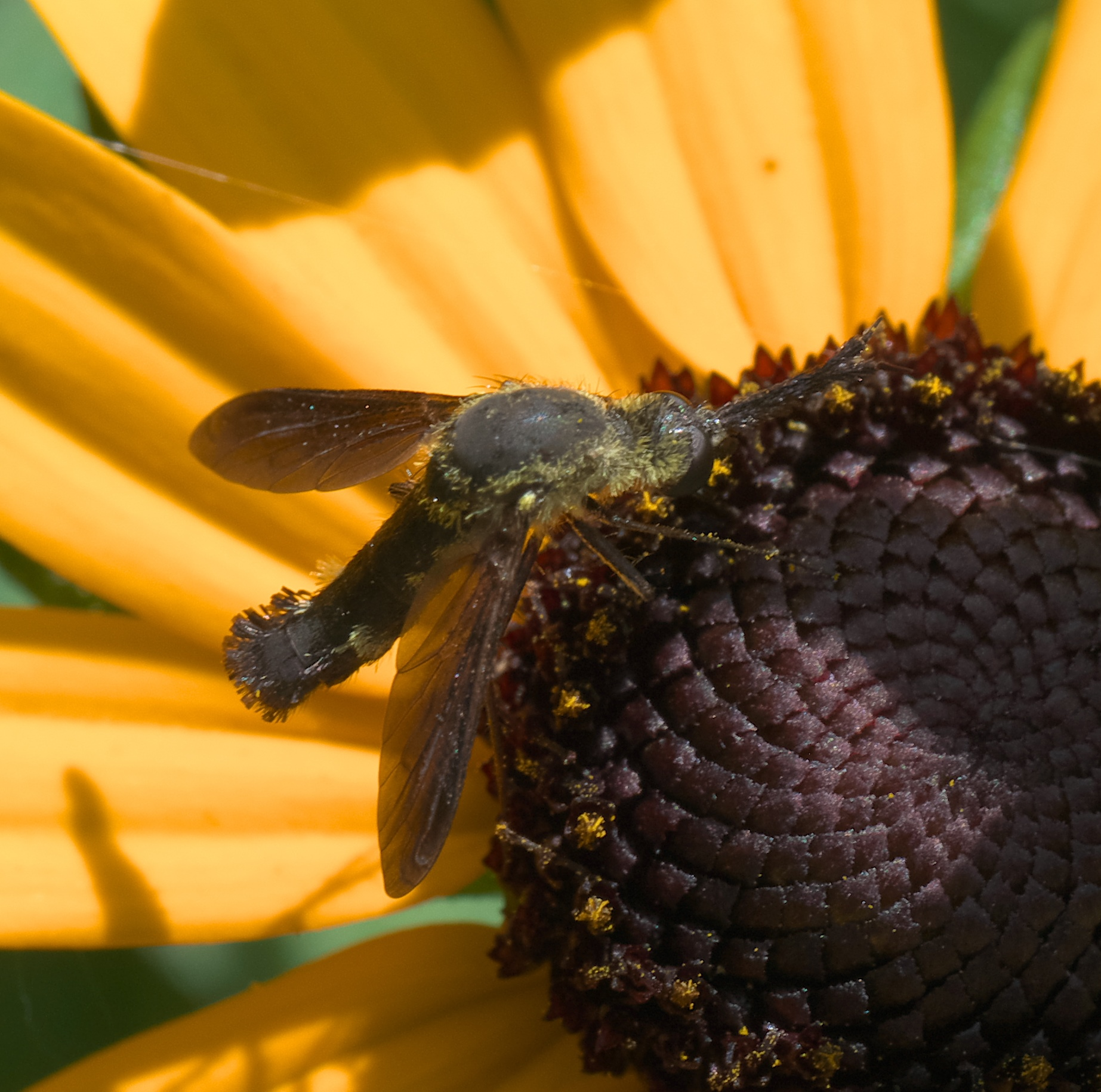
- Lepidophora lepidocera

Scientific classification
- Kingdom: Animalia
- Phylum: Arthropoda
- Class: Insecta
- Order: Diptera
- Family: Bombyliidae
- Subfamily: Bombyliinae
- Tribe: Eclimini
- Genus: Lepidophora; Westwood, 1835

= Lepidophora =

Genus of flies

Lepidophora is a genus of bee flies in the family Bombyliidae. There are eight described species in Lepidophora.

== Species ==
These eight species belong to the genus Lepidophora:

- Lepidophora acroleuca Painter, 1930
- Lepidophora culiciformis Walker, 1850^{g}
- Lepidophora cuneata Painter, 1939^{c g}
- Lepidophora lepidocera (Wiedemann, 1828)^{i c g b} (scaly bee fly)
- Lepidophora lutea Painter, 1962^{i c g b}
- Lepidophora secutor Walker, 1857^{c g}
- Lepidophora trypoxylona Hall, 1981^{c g}
- Lepidophora vetusta Walker, 1857^{i c g b}

Data sources: i = ITIS, c = Catalogue of Life, g = GBIF, b = Bugguide.net
