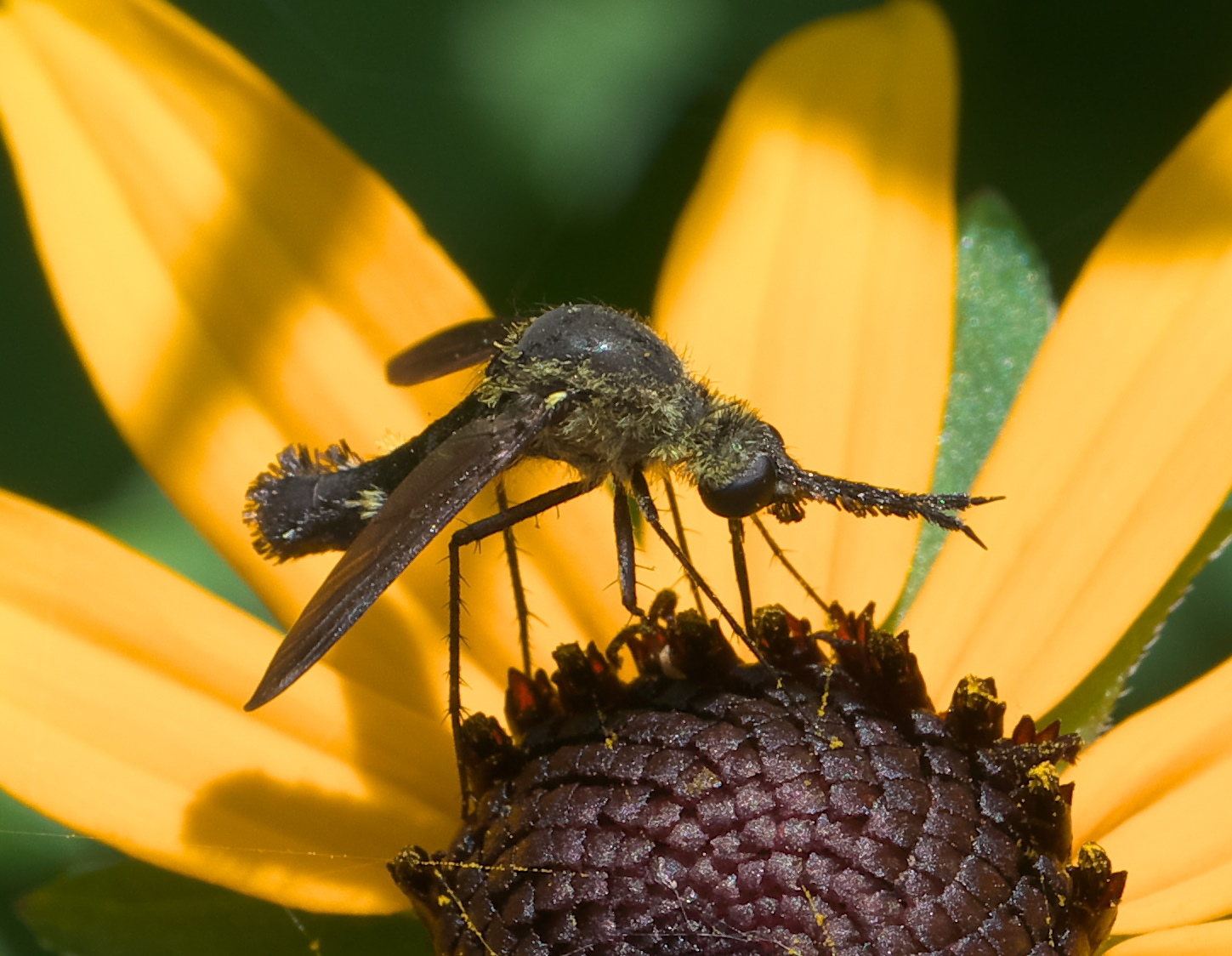

Scientific classification
- Domain: Eukaryota
- Kingdom: Animalia
- Phylum: Arthropoda
- Class: Insecta
- Order: Diptera
- Family: Bombyliidae
- Genus: Lepidophora
- Species: L. lepidocera

Binomial name
- Lepidophora lepidocera (Wiedemann, 1828)

Synonyms
- Lepidophora aegeriiformis Gray, 1832; Toxophora appendiculata Macquart, 1846; Toxophora lepidocera Wiedemann, 1828

= Lepidophora lepidocera =

Species of fly

Lepidophora lepidocera, the scaly bee fly, is a species of bee fly in the family of Bombyliidae. It is found in the eastern United States from Florida and New York west to Texas and Colorado.

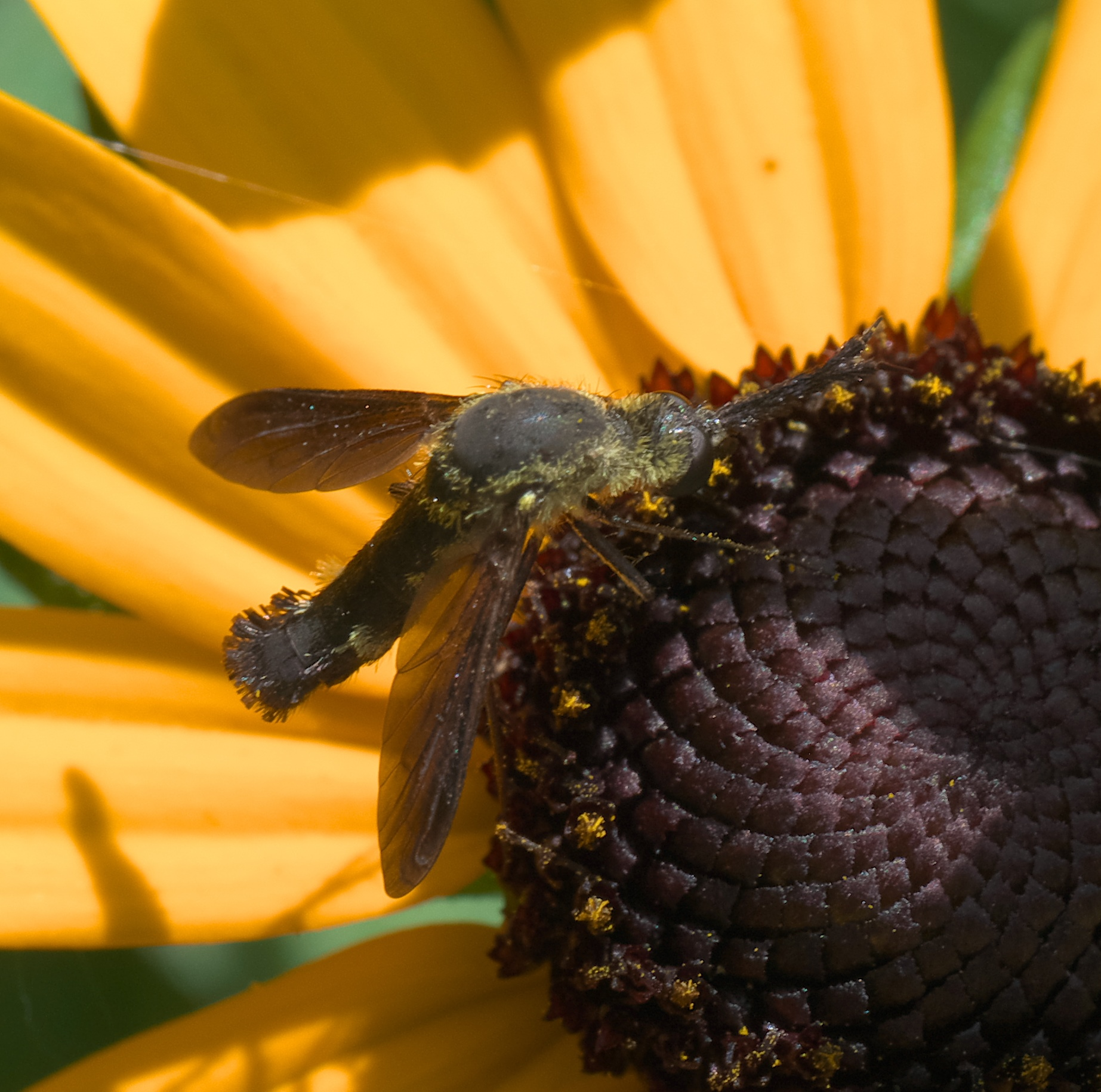
Scaly bee fly, Lepidophora lepidocera
