= Anaxita martha =

Scientific classification
- Domain: Eukaryota
- Kingdom: Animalia
- Phylum: Arthropoda
- Class: Insecta
- Order: Lepidoptera
- Superfamily: Noctuoidea
- Family: Erebidae
- Subfamily: Arctiinae
- Genus: Anaxita
- Species: A. martha

Binomial name
- Anaxita martha Dognin, 1904

Synonyms
- Anaxita lysandra Druce, 1904

Species of moth

Anaxita martha is a moth of the family Erebidae. It is found in Peru.
