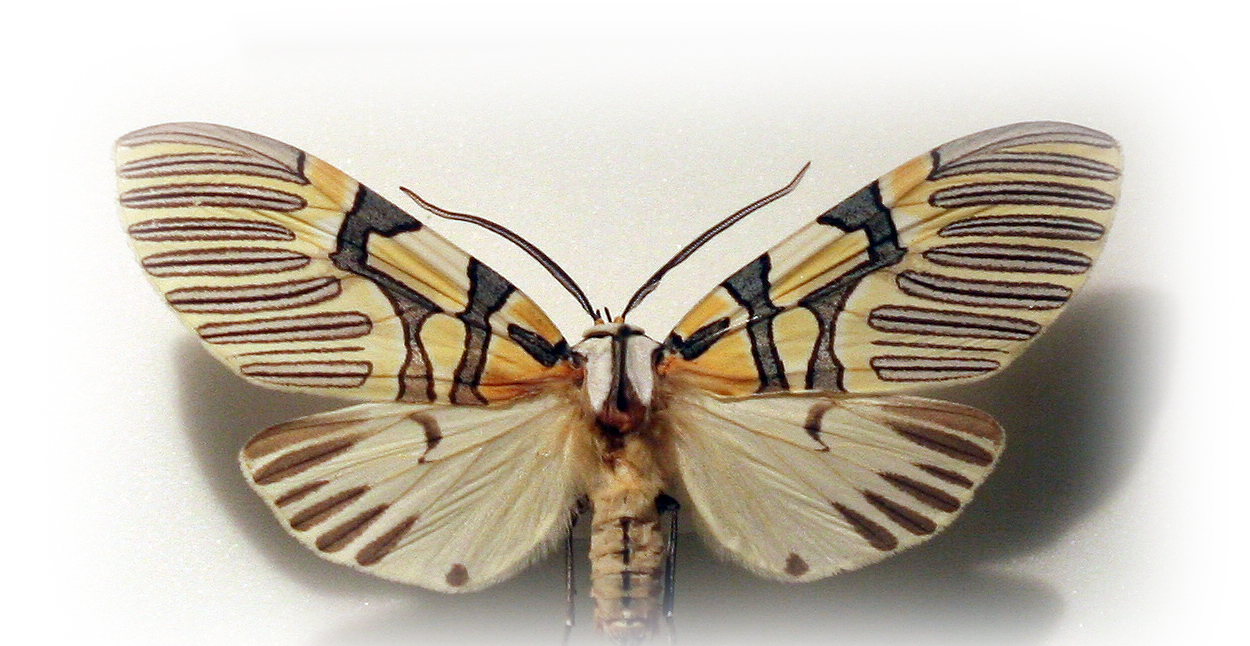
- Anaxita decorata

Scientific classification
- Kingdom: Animalia
- Phylum: Arthropoda
- Clade: Pancrustacea
- Class: Insecta
- Order: Lepidoptera
- Superfamily: Noctuoidea
- Family: Erebidae
- Subfamily: Arctiinae
- Subtribe: Phaegopterina
- Genus: Anaxita; Walker, 1855

Synonyms
- Echemis Boisduval, 1870

= Anaxita =

Genus of moths

Anaxita is a genus of moths in the family Erebidae. The genus was erected by Francis Walker in 1855.

== Species ==
- Anaxita brueckneri
- Anaxita decorata
- Anaxita drucei
- Anaxita martha
- Anaxita sannionis
- Anaxita sophia
- Anaxita suprema
- Anaxita tricoloriceps
- Anaxita vetusta
