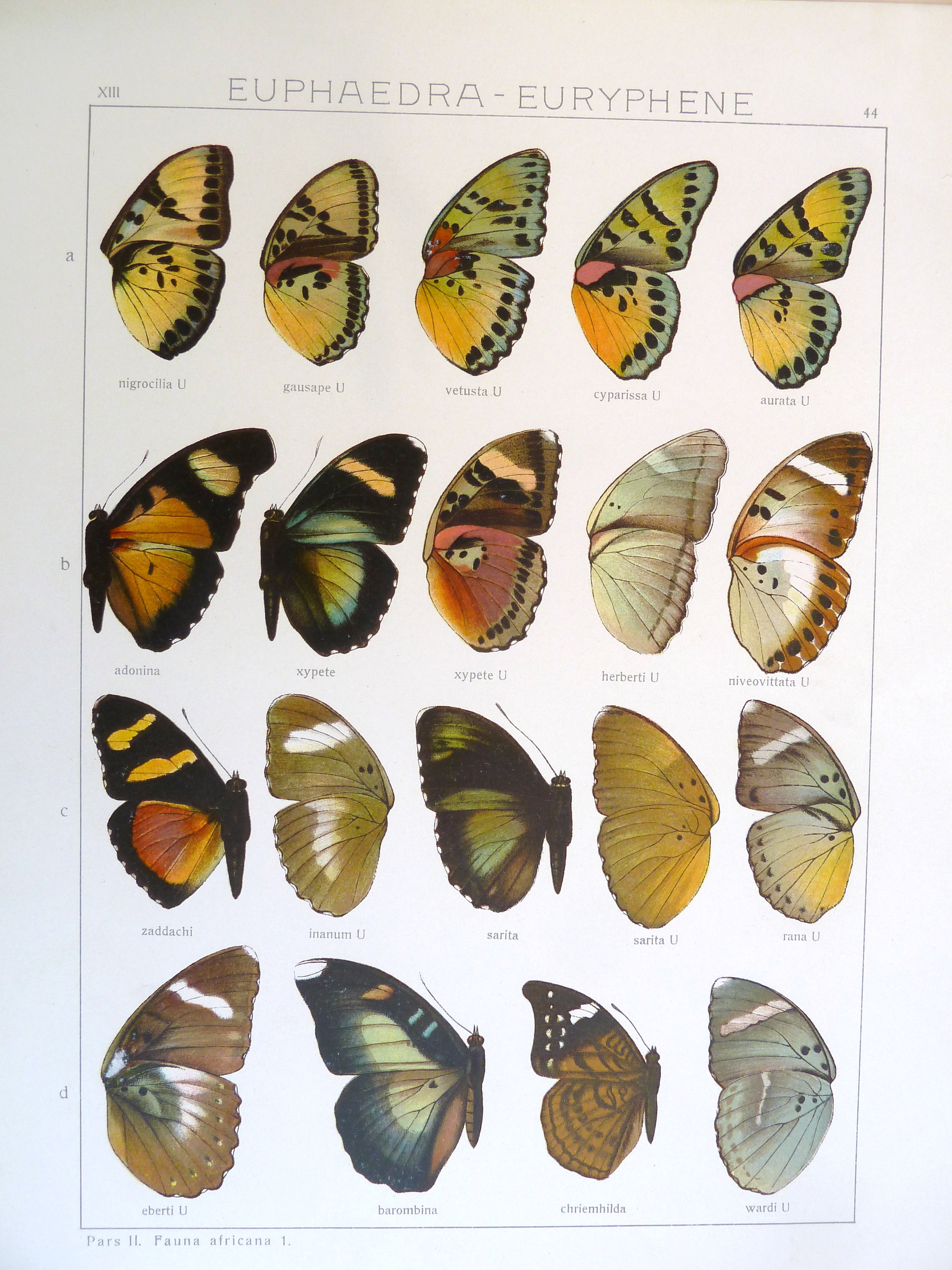
- In Adalbert Seitz's Fauna Africana

Scientific classification
- Kingdom: Animalia
- Phylum: Arthropoda
- Class: Insecta
- Order: Lepidoptera
- Family: Nymphalidae
- Genus: Euphaedra
- Species: E. vetusta

Binomial name
- Euphaedra vetusta (Butler, 1871)

Synonyms
- Romaleosoma vetusta Butler, 1871; Euphaedra (Euphaedrana) vetusta

= Euphaedra vetusta =

Species of butterfly

Euphaedra vetusta, the green Themis forester, is a butterfly in the family Nymphalidae. It is found in Sierra Leone, Ivory Coast and Ghana. The habitat consists of dense forests.

Adults are attracted to fallen fruit.

== Similar species ==
Other members of themis species group q.v.- ab. vetusta Btlr. (44 a) is distinguished from Euphaedra normalis and Euphaedra aberrans by having the discal spots on the forewing beneath placed in an oblique row running towards the hinder angle. Sierra Leone and Congo.
