= Anaxita tricoloriceps =

Scientific classification
- Domain: Eukaryota
- Kingdom: Animalia
- Phylum: Arthropoda
- Class: Insecta
- Order: Lepidoptera
- Superfamily: Noctuoidea
- Family: Erebidae
- Subfamily: Arctiinae
- Genus: Anaxita
- Species: A. tricoloriceps

Binomial name
- Anaxita tricoloriceps Strand, 1911

Species of moth

Anaxita tricoloriceps is a moth of the family Erebidae. It is found in Mexico.

The Anaxita tricoloriceps is known for its incredibly eye-catching patterns and colours, typically consisting of either beige or red wings. These Mexican native moths can grow to a decent size for a moth.

All of the Anaxita variants are very pretty and unique in their own way and it's truly an amazing thing to sit back and admire their colours and patterns.

This type of moth is unique to Mexico only, preferring to stay in hotter climates.

thumb
