= Anaxita sannionis =

Scientific classification
- Domain: Eukaryota
- Kingdom: Animalia
- Phylum: Arthropoda
- Class: Insecta
- Order: Lepidoptera
- Superfamily: Noctuoidea
- Family: Erebidae
- Subfamily: Arctiinae
- Genus: Anaxita
- Species: A. sannionis

Binomial name
- Anaxita sannionis Butler, 1873

Synonyms
- Anaxita sannionis ab. constricta Strand, 1911

Species of moth

Anaxita sannionis is a moth of the family Erebidae. It is found in Peru.
