= Anaxita suprema =

Scientific classification
- Kingdom: Animalia
- Phylum: Arthropoda
- Class: Insecta
- Order: Lepidoptera
- Superfamily: Noctuoidea
- Family: Erebidae
- Subfamily: Arctiinae
- Genus: Anaxita
- Species: A. suprema

Binomial name
- Anaxita suprema (Walker, [1865])

Synonyms
- Empyreuma suprema Walker, [1865]

Species of moth

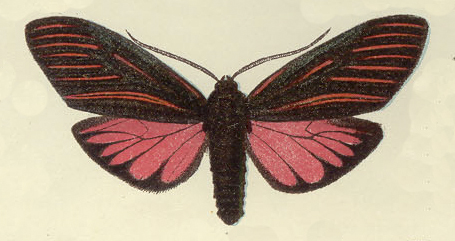
Anaxita suprema

Anaxita suprema is a moth of the family Erebidae. It is found in Colombia.
