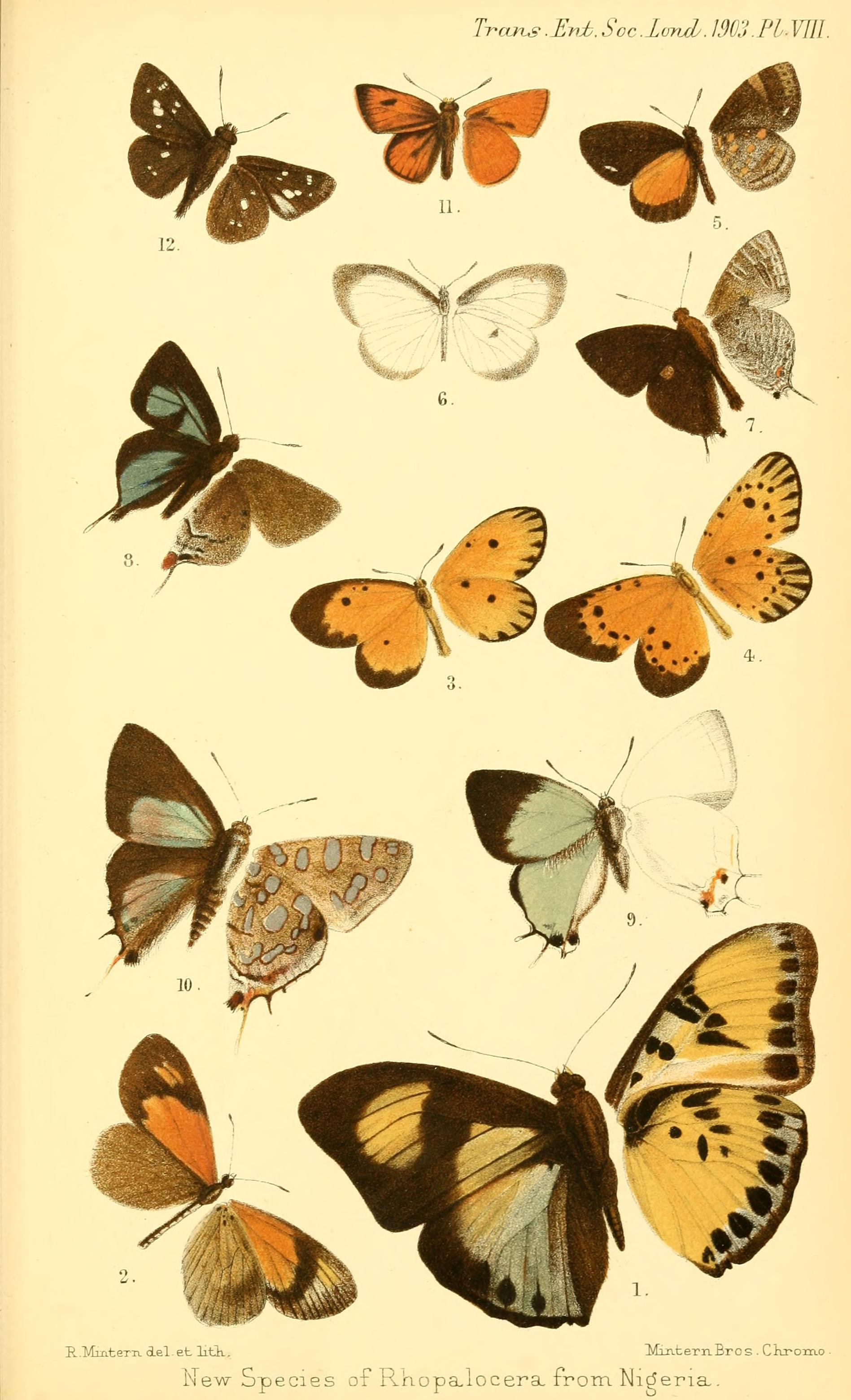
- Figure 1

Scientific classification
- Kingdom: Animalia
- Phylum: Arthropoda
- Clade: Pancrustacea
- Class: Insecta
- Order: Lepidoptera
- Family: Nymphalidae
- Genus: Euphaedra
- Species: E. nigrocilia

Binomial name
- Euphaedra nigrocilia Lathy, 1903

Synonyms
- Euphaedra (Euphaedrana) nigrocilia

= Euphaedra nigrocilia =

Species of butterfly

Euphaedra nigrocilia, the brighter Ceres forester, is a butterfly in the family Nymphalidae. It is found in eastern Nigeria. The habitat consists of drier forests in the savanna transition zone.

== Similar species ==
Other members of the Euphaedra ceres species group q.v.
