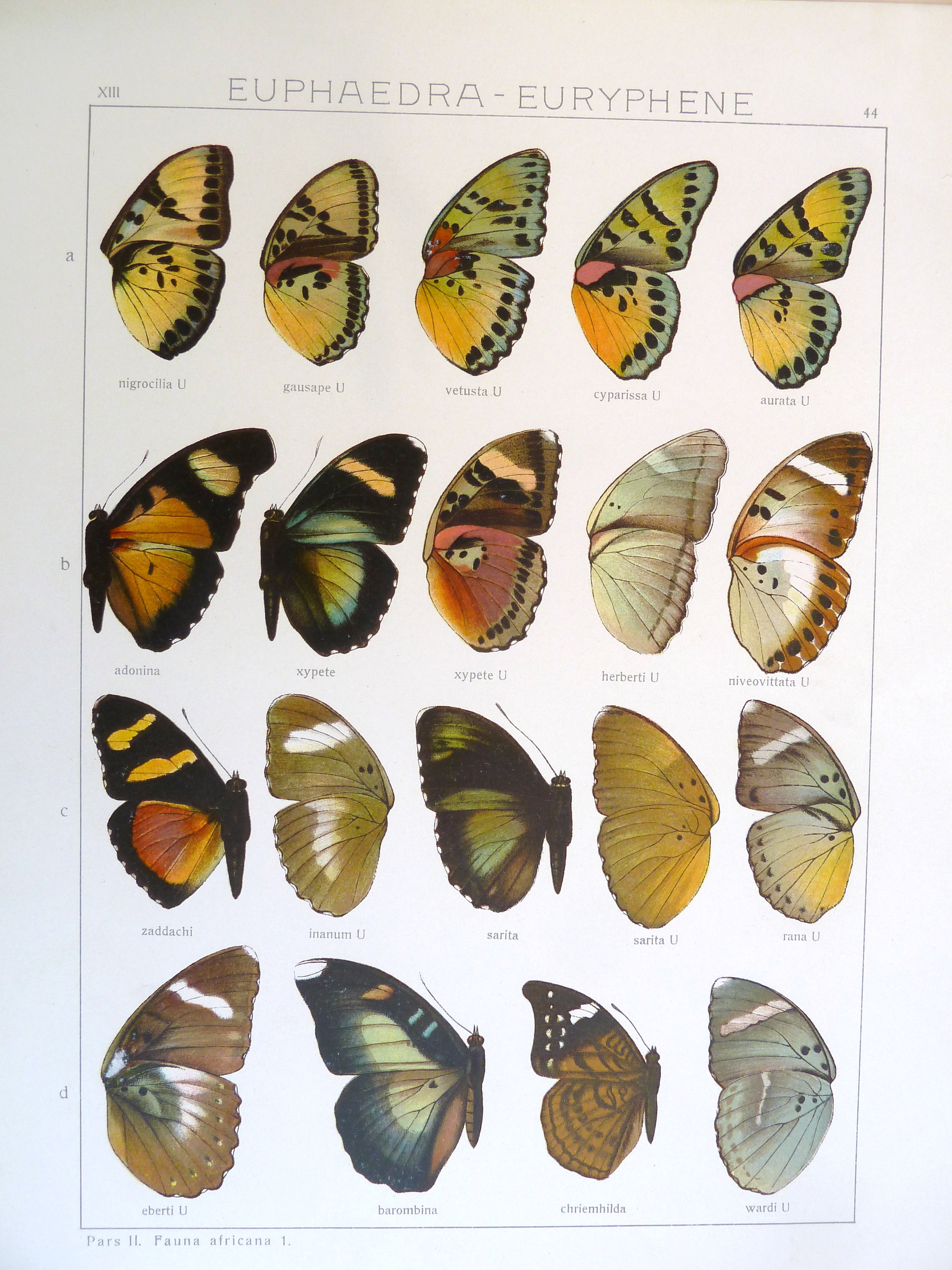
- In Adalbert Seitz's Fauna Africana

Scientific classification
- Kingdom: Animalia
- Phylum: Arthropoda
- Class: Insecta
- Order: Lepidoptera
- Family: Nymphalidae
- Genus: Euphaedra
- Species: E. sarita

Binomial name
- Euphaedra sarita (Sharpe, 1891)

Synonyms
- Romaleosoma sarita Sharpe, 1891; Euphaedra (Euphaedrana) sarita; Euphaedra sarita sarita f. stigmatica Hecq, 1977

= Euphaedra sarita =

Species of butterfly

Euphaedra sarita is a butterfly in the family Nymphalidae. It is found in Cameroon, the Republic of the Congo, the Central African Republic, the Democratic Republic of the Congo and Ethiopia.

== Description ==
E. sarita E. Sharpe (44 c), like inanum, has no black markings on the under surface except 1-3 dots in the cells; the ground-colour of the underside is very variable, light green -yellow-green - yellow-brown, and the hindwing has no white median band but occasionally light green submarginal spots; the subapical band of the forewing is in the male above dark green and triangular, beneath quite obsolete or only indicated, in the female whitish; the blue-green hindmarginal spot on the forewing reaches at least to vein 2. Congo - ab. abyssinica Rothsch. has on the under surface the base of the costal margin of the hindwing bright ochre-yellow and a black spot on the precostal vein. Abyssinia.

== Subspecies ==
- Euphaedra sarita sarita (Cameroon, Congo, Central African Republic, central and northern Democratic Republic of the Congo, western Uganda: Semuliki National Park)
- Euphaedra sarita abyssinica Rothschild, 1902 (south-western Ethiopia)
- Euphaedra sarita lulua Hecq, 1977 (southern Democratic Republic of the Congo)

== Similar species ==
Other members of the Euphaedra ceres species group
