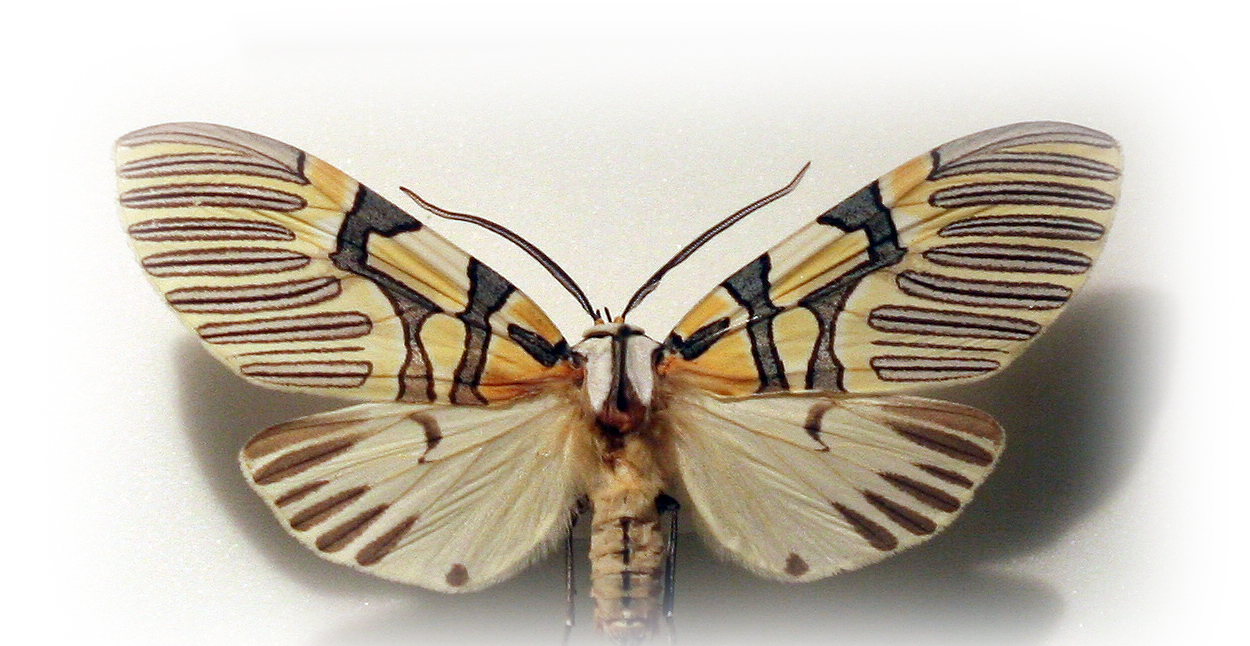

Scientific classification
- Kingdom: Animalia
- Phylum: Arthropoda
- Clade: Pancrustacea
- Class: Insecta
- Order: Lepidoptera
- Superfamily: Noctuoidea
- Family: Erebidae
- Subfamily: Arctiinae
- Genus: Anaxita
- Species: A. decorata

Binomial name
- Anaxita decorata Walker, 1855

Synonyms
- Phaegoptera elegantissima Herrich-Schäffer, 1856; Echemis calypso Boisduval, 1870; Anaxita elegantissima Herrich-Schäffer, [1856]

= Anaxita decorata =

Decorated beauty

Species of moth

Anaxita decorata, the decorated beauty, is a moth of the family Erebidae. It is found in Mexico and Central America.
