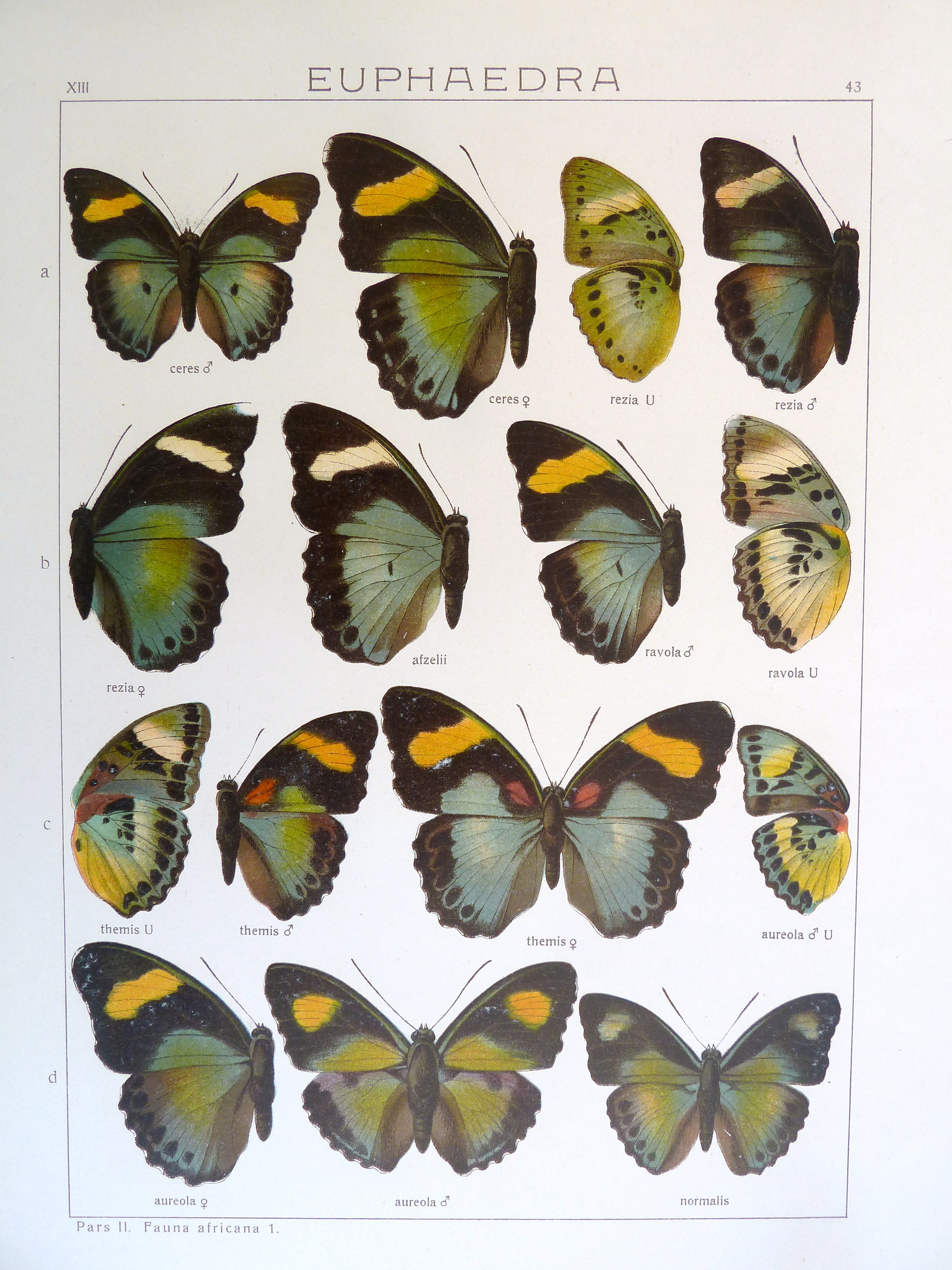
- In Adalbert Seitz's Fauna Africana

Scientific classification
- Kingdom: Animalia
- Phylum: Arthropoda
- Class: Insecta
- Order: Lepidoptera
- Family: Nymphalidae
- Genus: Euphaedra
- Species: E. normalis

Binomial name
- Euphaedra normalis Staudinger, 1891

Synonyms
- Euphaedra aberrans var. normalis Staudinger, 1891; Euphaedra (Euphaedrana) normalis

= Euphaedra normalis =

Species of butterfly

Euphaedra normalis is a butterfly in the family Nymphalidae. It is found in Sierra Leone.

Its wingspan ranges from 73 to 93 millimeters.

== Similar species ==
Members of themis species group q.v.
