= Anaxita vetusta =

Scientific classification
- Domain: Eukaryota
- Kingdom: Animalia
- Phylum: Arthropoda
- Class: Insecta
- Order: Lepidoptera
- Superfamily: Noctuoidea
- Family: Erebidae
- Subfamily: Arctiinae
- Genus: Anaxita
- Species: A. vetusta

Binomial name
- Anaxita vetusta Strand, 1911

Species of moth

Anaxita vetusta is a moth of the family Erebidae first described by Embrik Strand in 1911. It is found in Peru.
