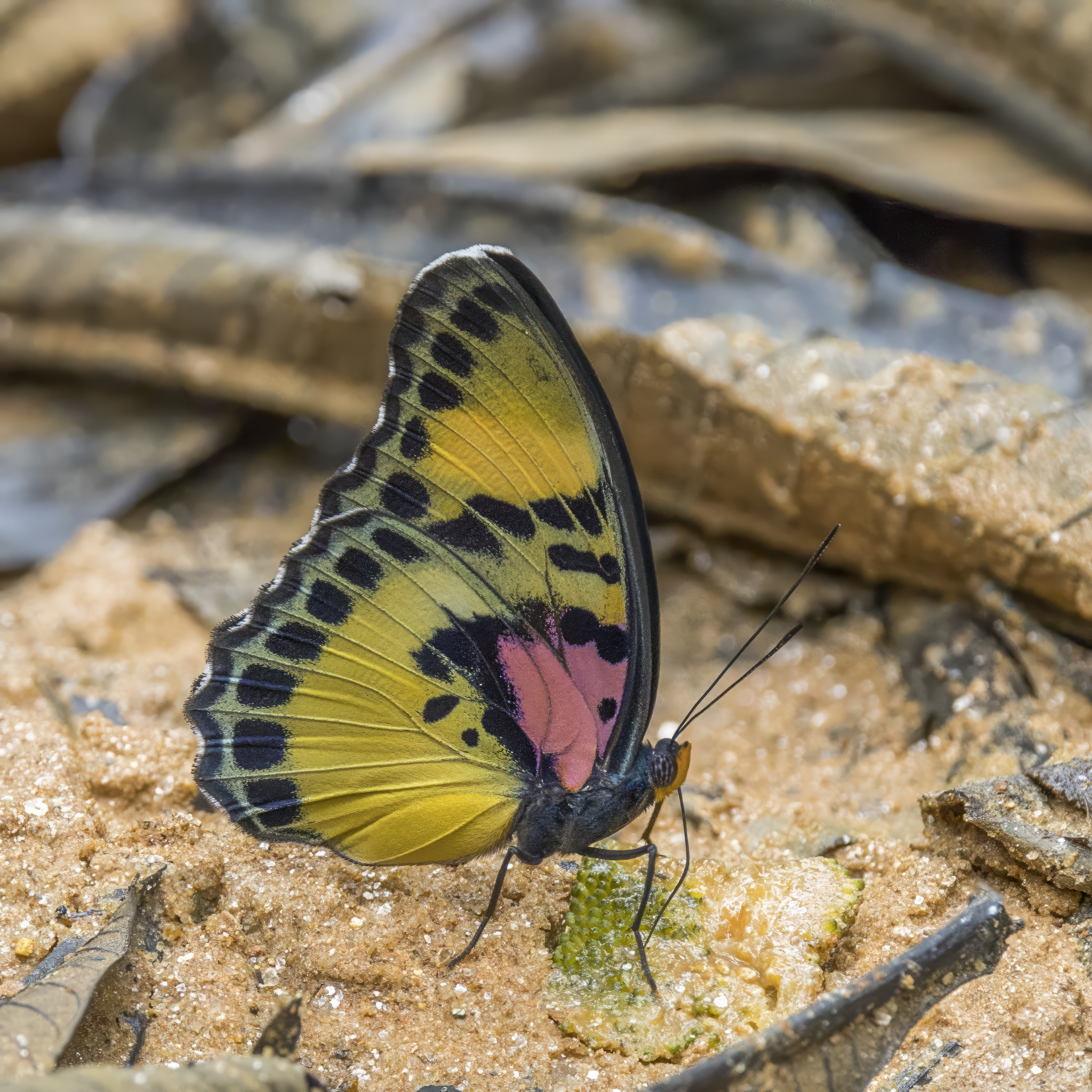
- female E. j. janetta, Ghana

Scientific classification
- Kingdom: Animalia
- Phylum: Arthropoda
- Clade: Pancrustacea
- Class: Insecta
- Order: Lepidoptera
- Family: Nymphalidae
- Genus: Euphaedra
- Species: E. janetta

Binomial name
- Euphaedra janetta (Butler, 1871)

Synonyms
- Romaleosoma janetta Butler, 1871; Euphaedra (Euphaedrana) janetta; Euphaedra themis ab. reducta Bartel, 1905; Euphaedra themis var. janettina Gaede, 1916; Euphaedra janetta var. viridis Schultze, 1920; Euphaedra janetta f. or Hecq, 1987; Euphaedra janetta var. insularis Schultze, 1920; Euphaedra campaspe f. campaspoides Hecq, 1982

= Euphaedra janetta =

Species of butterfly

Euphaedra janetta, the Janetta Themis forester, is a butterfly in the family Nymphalidae. It is found in Guinea, Sierra Leone, Liberia, Ivory Coast, Ghana, Togo, Benin, Nigeria, Cameroon, Equatorial Guinea, the Central African Republic and the Democratic Republic of the Congo. The habitat consists of forests.

== Description ==
ab. janetta Btlr. The forewing above without red at the base; its subapical band on both surfaces gold-yellow or yellowish; both wings beneath violet-red at the base. Ashanti to Cameroons.

== Biology ==
Adults are attracted to fallen fruit.

== Subspecies ==
- E. j. janetta (Guinea, Sierra Leone, Liberia, Ivory Coast, Ghana, Togo, Benin, Nigeria, western Cameroon)
- E. j. campaspoides Hecq, 1985 (Democratic Republic of the Congo, Central African Republic)
- E. j. insularis Schultze, 1920 (Bioko)
- E. j. remota Hecq, 1991 (Democratic Republic of the Congo: Equateur, Central African Republic)

Torben Larsen developed a species numbering system for his 2005 publication Butterflies of West Africa. The nominate subspecies is #1075. The 'Larsen' numbers have since been used with permission in A Sharp Eye on Butterflies of Ghana.

== Similar species ==
Other members of themis species group q.v.
