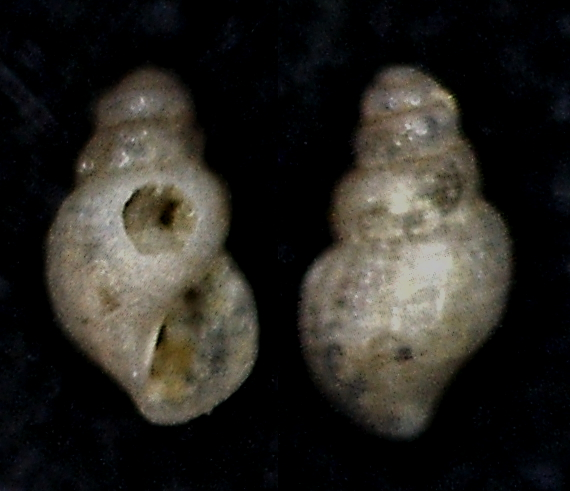
- Shell of Alvania elegantissima

Scientific classification
- Kingdom: Animalia
- Phylum: Mollusca
- Class: Gastropoda
- Subclass: Caenogastropoda
- Order: Littorinimorpha
- Superfamily: Rissooidea
- Family: Rissoidae
- Genus: Alvania
- Species: A. elegantissima

Binomial name
- Alvania elegantissima (Monterosato, 1875)

Synonyms
- Alvania dilecta Gaglini, 1991 ·; Rissoa abyssicola var. obtusa Jeffreys, 1870; Rissoa elegantissima Monterosato, 1875; Turbona elegantissima (Monterosato, 1875) ·

= Alvania elegantissima =

Species of gastropod

Alvania elegantissima is a species of minute sea snail, a marine gastropod mollusk or micromollusk in the family Rissoidae.

== Description ==
The length of the shell attains 1.6 mm.

(Described as Rissoa abyssicola var. obtusa Jeffreys, 1870) Shell regularly oval, with a shorter spire and a less oblique outline, compared to Alvania testae (Aradas & Maggiore, 1844)

The whorls and the protoconch are convex without sculpture.

== Distribution ==
This species lives in the Mediterranean Sea and in the Tyrrhenian Sea at depths between 300 m and 400 m.
