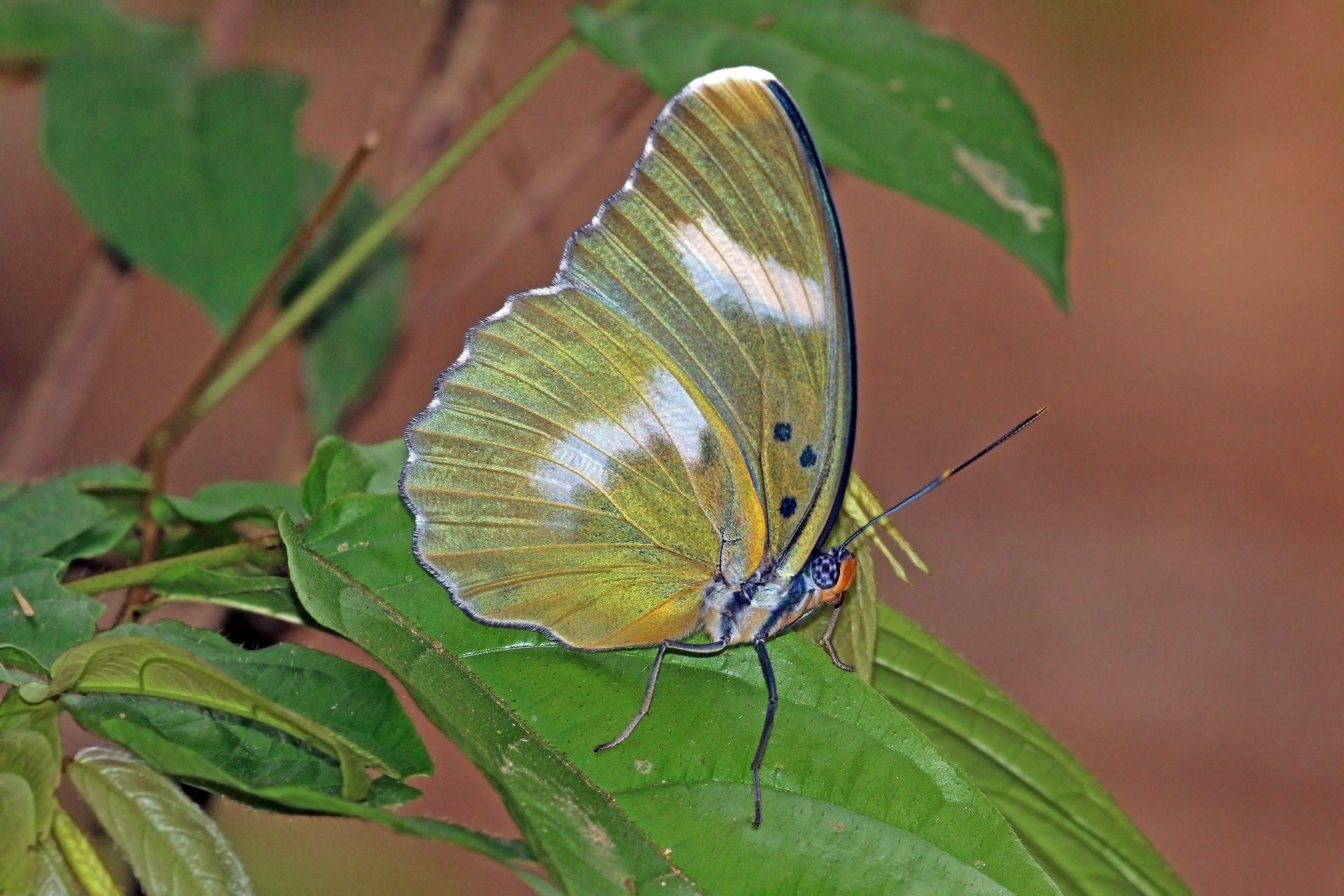
- female Bobiri Forest, Ghana

Scientific classification
- Kingdom: Animalia
- Phylum: Arthropoda
- Clade: Pancrustacea
- Class: Insecta
- Order: Lepidoptera
- Family: Nymphalidae
- Genus: Euphaedra
- Species: E. inanum

Binomial name
- Euphaedra inanum (Butler, 1873)

Synonyms
- Romaleosoma inanum Butler, 1873; Euphaedra (Euphaedrana) inanum

= Euphaedra inanum =

Species of butterfly

Euphaedra inanum, the unmarked Ceres forester, is a butterfly in the family Nymphalidae. It is found in Guinea-Bissau, Guinea, Sierra Leone, Ivory Coast and Ghana.

== Description ==
E. inanum Btlr. (42 d; 44 c). Both wings beneath without black discal and submarginal spots, but with 2 or 3 black dots in the cell of the forewing and 1 or 2 in that of the hindwing; hindwing beneath in both sexes with sharply defined white median band, sometimes broken up into spots, extending from the costal margin to vein 3 or 4; hindwing often with bluish or green submarginal spots on both surfaces; subapical band of the forewing above light yellowish (male) or nearly white (female), beneath white; the bluish hindmarginal spot on the upperside of the forewing narrow. Sierra Leone to Angola.

The habitat consists of dense forests.

Adults are attracted to fallen fruit.

The larvae feed on Sorindeia warneckei.

Torben Larsen developed a species numbering system for his 2005 publication Butterflies of West Africa. This species is #1086. The 'Larsen' numbers have since been used with permission in A Sharp Eye on Butterflies of Ghana.

== Similar species ==
Other members of the Euphaedra ceres species group
