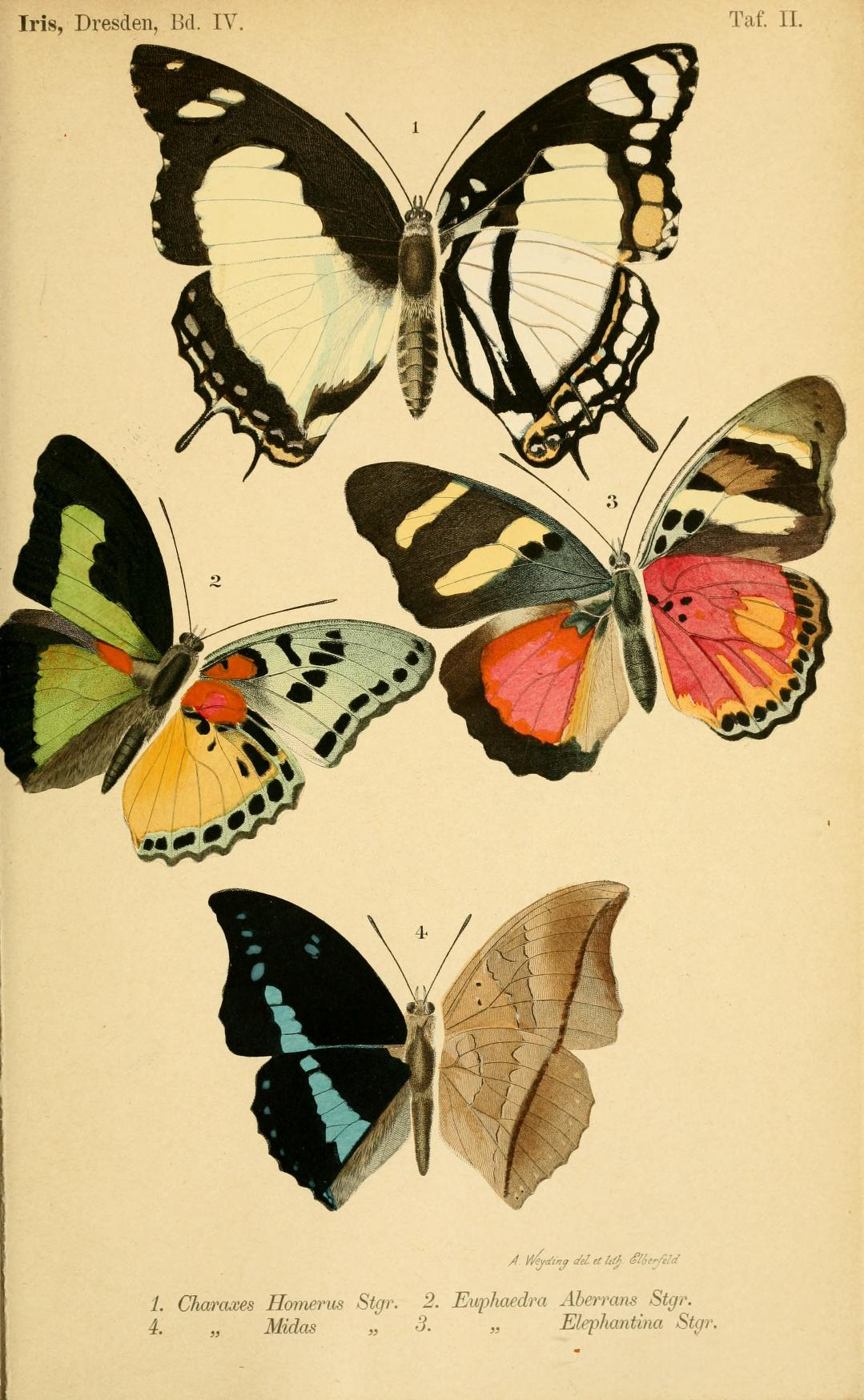

Scientific classification
- Kingdom: Animalia
- Phylum: Arthropoda
- Class: Insecta
- Order: Lepidoptera
- Family: Nymphalidae
- Genus: Euphaedra
- Species: E. aberrans

Binomial name
- Euphaedra aberrans Staudinger, 1891

Synonyms
- Euphaedra (Euphaedrana) aberrans

= Euphaedra aberrans =

Species of butterfly

Euphaedra aberrans, the aberrant Themis forester, is a butterfly in the family Nymphalidae. It is found in Guinea, Sierra Leone and Ghana. The habitat consists of forests.

== Similar species ==
Other members of themis species group q.v.
