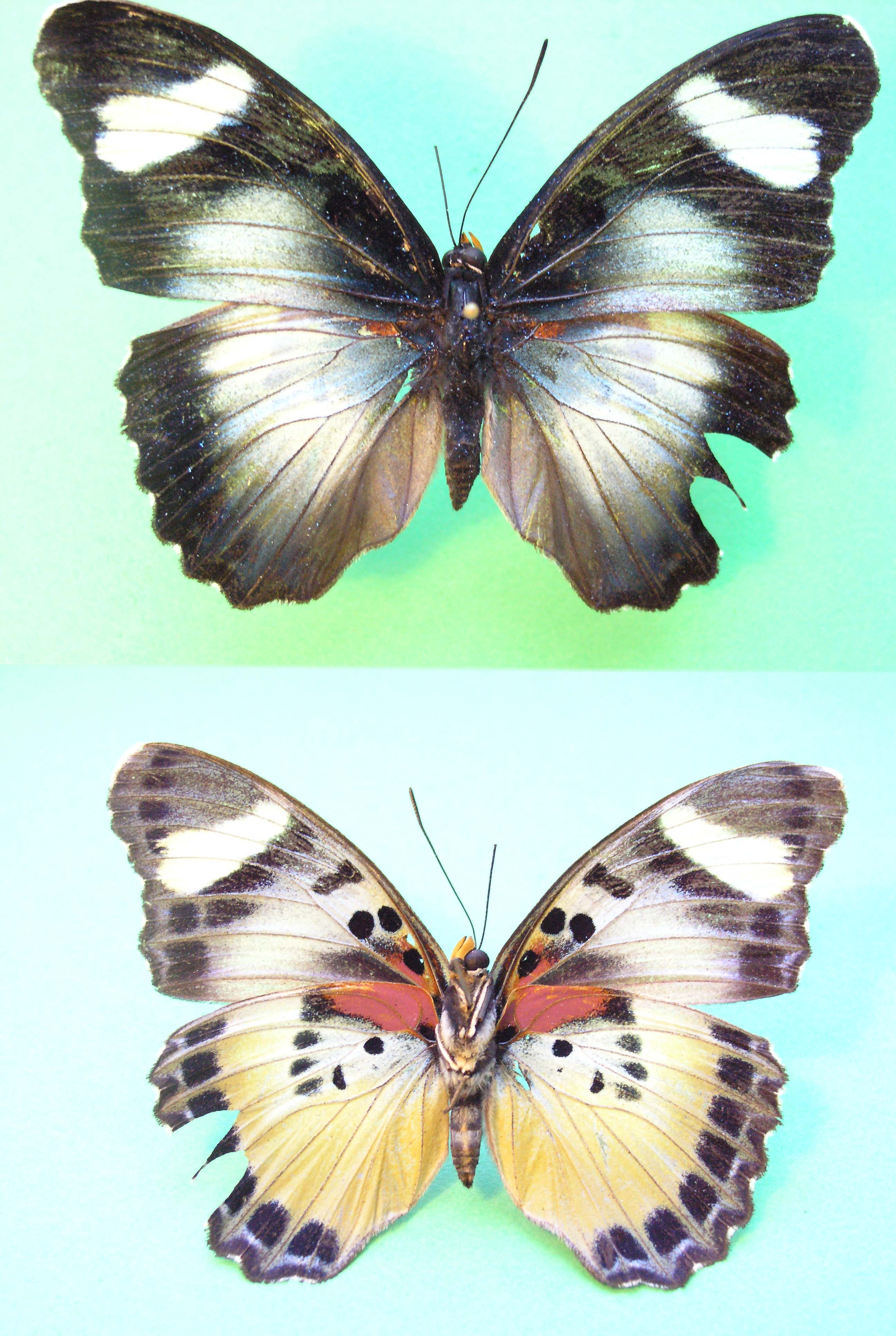

Scientific classification
- Kingdom: Animalia
- Phylum: Arthropoda
- Class: Insecta
- Order: Lepidoptera
- Family: Nymphalidae
- Genus: Euphaedra
- Species: E. permixtum

Binomial name
- Euphaedra permixtum (Butler, 1873)

Synonyms
- Romaleosoma permixtum Butler, 1873; Euphaedra (Euphaedrana) permixtum; Euphaedra themis var. innocentia Staudinger, 1886; Romaleosoma rubronotata Sharpe, 1891

= Euphaedra permixtum =

Species of butterfly

Euphaedra permixtum, the robust Themis forester, is a butterfly in the family Nymphalidae that occurs in forested areas of Nigeria, Cameroon, Gabon, the Democratic Republic of the Congo and possibly Angola.

It is known to consume fallen fruit.

== Subspecies ==
- Euphaedra permixtum permixtum (Cameroon, Gabon, Democratic Republic of the Congo: Bas-Zaire, Angola)
- Euphaedra permixtum diva Hecq, 1982 (Nigeria: Cross River loop, western Cameroon)

== Similar species ==
Other members of themis species group q.v. ab. permixtum Btlr. only differs from themis in having the subapical band of the forewing composed of only two spots, in cellules 3 and 4. Gaboon.
