= Lepidophora vetusta =

Scientific classification
- Kingdom: Animalia
- Phylum: Arthropoda
- Class: Insecta
- Order: Diptera
- Family: Bombyliidae
- Genus: Lepidophora
- Species: L. vetusta

Binomial name
- Lepidophora vetusta Walker, 1857

Species of fly

Lepidophora vetusta is a species of bee fly in the family Bombyliidae. It is found in Texas, Mexico, and Central America as far south as Costa Rica.
