= Euphaedra ceres =

- female E. c. ceres, Ghana

Scientific classification
- Kingdom: Animalia
- Phylum: Arthropoda
- Clade: Pancrustacea
- Class: Insecta
- Order: Lepidoptera
- Family: Nymphalidae
- Genus: Euphaedra
- Species: E. ceres

Binomial name
- Euphaedra ceres (Fabricius, 1775)

Synonyms
- Papilio ceres Fabricius, 1775; Euphaedra (Euphaedrana) ceres; Papilio lucille Cramer, 1777; Papilio lucullus Herbst, 1792; Romalaeosoma zeuxis Westwood, 1850; Euphaedra × schultzei Neustetter, 1927 (hybrid of E. ceres and E. themis); Euphaedra ceres ab. abluta Schultze, 1920

Species of butterfly

Euphaedra ceres, the Ceres forester, is a butterfly in the family Nymphalidae. It is found in western and central Africa (Gambia, Guinea, Sierra Leone, Liberia, Ivory Coast, Ghana, Togo, Benin, Nigeria, Cameroon, Gabon and the Republic of the Congo).

== Description ==
Note The species of this subgroup may he at once known by the hindwing not being red at the base of the costal margin beneath. In this subgroup also occur forms with and without black spots on the under surface. E. ceres differs from the other forms of the subgroup in having distinct, though sometimes small, black discal spots on the underside of both wings; also the cells beneath always with 2 or 3 black spots; the hindmarginal spot on the upperside of the forewing is green or bluish, rarely reaches the base, but cellule 2; hindwing blue or green above. The species is very variable and the forms erected intergrade without sharp dividing-lines- ceres F. (43 a). Wings beneath with distinct black submarginal spots, the black discal spots in cellules 3-5 on the underside of the forewing, which basally bound the light subapical band, are usually large and placed close behind the apex of the cell, which is closed by a black transverse spot; hindwing beneath with white or whitish median band and above usually with black discocellular spot; the subapical band of the forewing is light greenish or whitish above, rarely yellow; the under surface at least in the basal part green or bluish, in the marginal part often suffused with brown; the fringes white-spotted. -ab. nigrocilia Lathy (44 a) [ now species Euphaedra nigrocilia ] has both wings greenish yellow beneath as far as the submarginal spots, without white median band on the hindwing; the fringes are unicolorous black; the subapical band on the upperside of the forewing is broadly rounded and greenish yellow. Nigeria. - ab. afzelii Fldr. (43 b) [ now species Euphaedra afzelii ]. Hindwing beneath without white median band; the subapical band of the fore wing in the male green, beneath light green and indistinct, in the female greenish or white; the under surface with bright green ground-colour, only at the inner margin of the hindwing somewhat yellowish; fringes black. The male fully corresponds to the form vetusta of themis. Sierra Leone. -ab. ravola Hew. (43 b) [now species Euphaedra ravola]. Hindwing beneath without white median band; the subapical band of the fore wing in both sexes broad and orange-yellow; the black spots on the under surface large and strongly developed. Liberia to Gaboon. - ab. rezia Hew. (43 a, b)[ now species Euphaedra rezia. The subapical band of the forewing is narrow and of uniform breadth and the discal spots on the under surface which bound it proximally small and rather far removed from the apex of the cell (usually much further than in the specimen figured); the apex of the forewing above has often a strong blue or green reflection, especially in the ground-colour of the under surface varies from green-yellowish to dark brown, the subapical band of the forewing is usually yellow or yellowish, in the female occasionally almost white. Cameroons to Kuilu. - ab. cottoni E. Sharpe [ now species Euphaedra cottoni] apparently only differs from rezia in having the yellow subapical band of the forewing broken up into spots. Ituri. - ab. phaethusa Btlr. [ now species Euphaedra phaethusa] differs from all the preceding forms in having the submarginal spots on the under surface entirely absent or only indicated; the black discal spots on the contrary are present and the hindwing has a whitish median band; the subapical band of the forewing is light yellow or greenish white ( = adelica Bartel). artaynta Moschler = Euphaedra phaethusais so inadequately described that I cannot identify it. The description runs: Most resembles ceres; the band of the fore wing is, however, not whitish but yellow and its shape is different; it runs from the costal margin obliquely towards the distal margin as far as cellule 4, in the middle of which its outer edge forms an obtuse angle directed towards the distal margin, whilst in ceres the band is regular; the colouring of the hindwing is of a duller green than in ceres; there is no trace of the whitish band at the costal margin which occurs in ceres; the deep black transverse spot on the transverse vein is likewise either entirely absent or only shows through faintly from the under surface; before the distal margin is placed a row of blue-green spots. The ground-colour of the under surface is a more or less dull olive-brown; the first black spot in the median band (at the costal margin) is much shorter and narrower than in ceres and projects much less basewards beyond the band; also the other spots of the band are much smaller than in that species; in the cell are placed 1 or 2 round black spots; behind the cell runs as far as cellule 2 a broad, sharply defined, white, bluish-tinged band, which in ceres is narrower and not sharply defined; the black spots before the distal margin are smaller than in ceres and the black crescentic marginal spots are entirely absent; apex narrowly white; fringes white-spotted. Ashanti.

Torben Larsen developed a species numbering system for his 2005 publication Butterflies of West Africa. This species is #1083. The 'Larsen' numbers have since been used with permission in A Sharp Eye on Butterflies of Ghana.

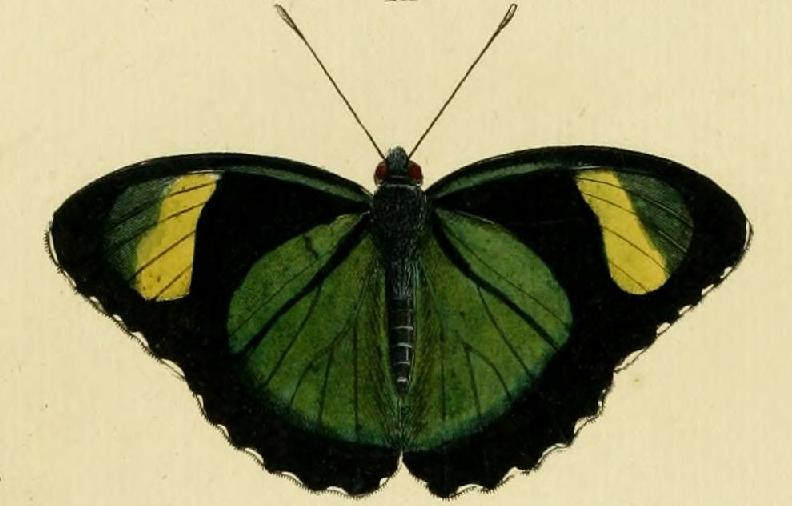

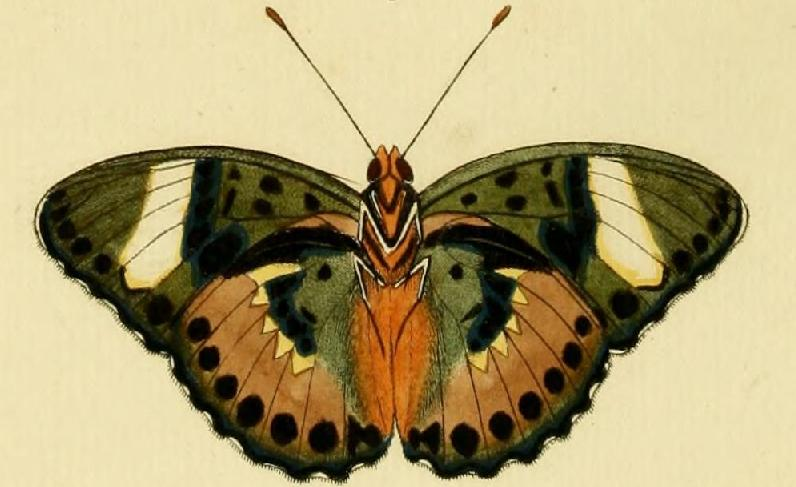

== Biology ==
The habitat consists of dry and wet forests, degraded habitats and suburban gardens.

Adults are attracted to fallen fruit.

The larvae feed on Deinbollia pinnata.

== Subspecies ==
- Euphaedra ceres ceres (Gambia, Guinea, Sierra Leone, Liberia, Ivory Coast, Ghana, Togo, Benin)
- Euphaedra ceres electra Hecq, 1983 (Cameroon, Gabon, Congo)
- Euphaedra ceres lutescens Hecq, 1979 (Nigeria)
