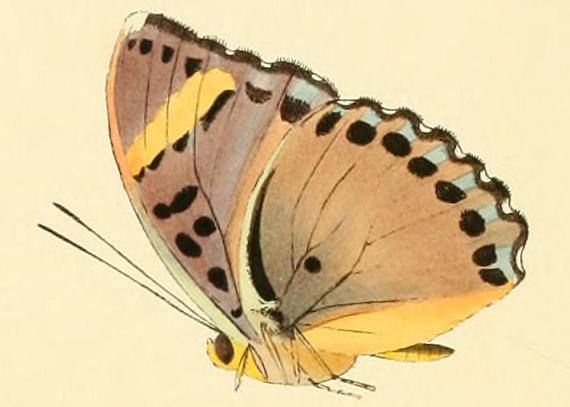

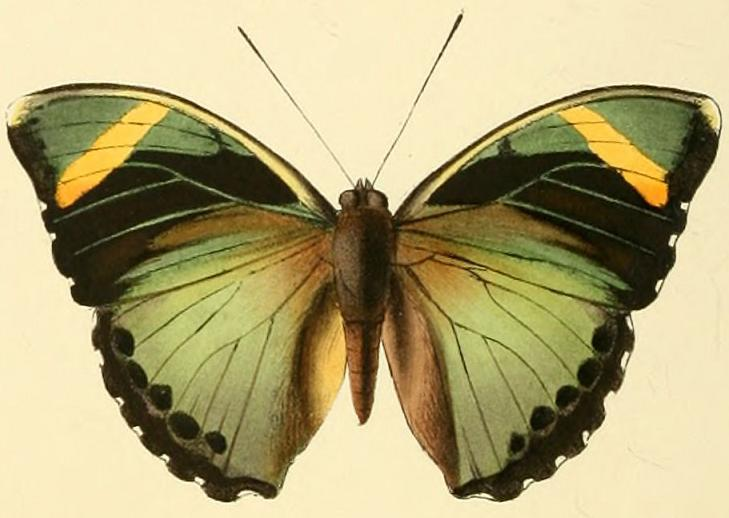

Scientific classification
- Kingdom: Animalia
- Phylum: Arthropoda
- Class: Insecta
- Order: Lepidoptera
- Family: Nymphalidae
- Genus: Euphaedra
- Species: E. rezia

Binomial name
- Euphaedra rezia (Hewitson, 1866)

Synonyms
- Romalaeosoma rezia Hewitson, 1866; Euphaedra (Euphaedrana) rezia

= Euphaedra rezia =

Species of butterfly

Euphaedra rezia, the Rezia Ceres forester, is a butterfly in the family Nymphalidae. It is found in Cameroon, Gabon, the Republic of the Congo, and possibly Nigeria. The habitat consists of forests.

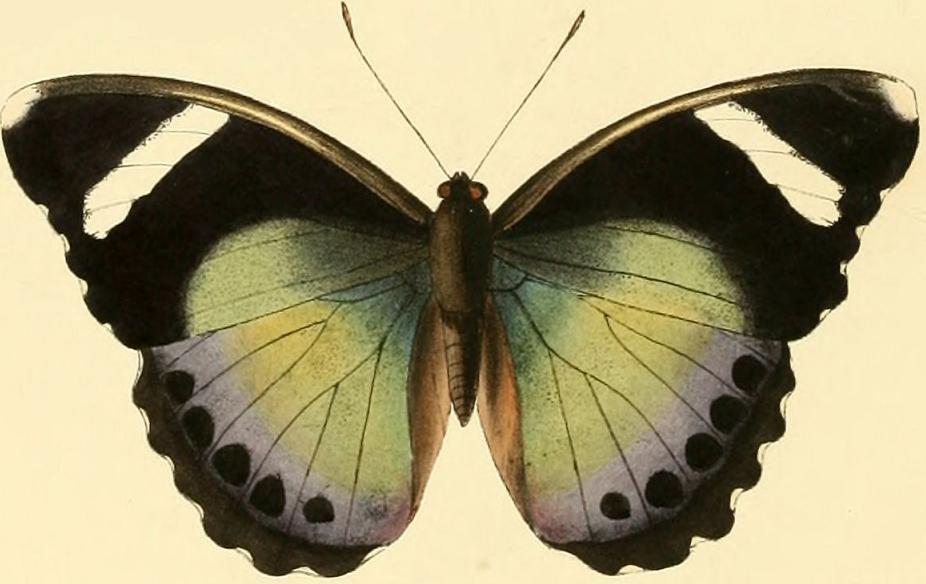

The larvae feed on Pancovia species.

== Similar species ==
Other members of the Euphaedra ceres species group q.v.
