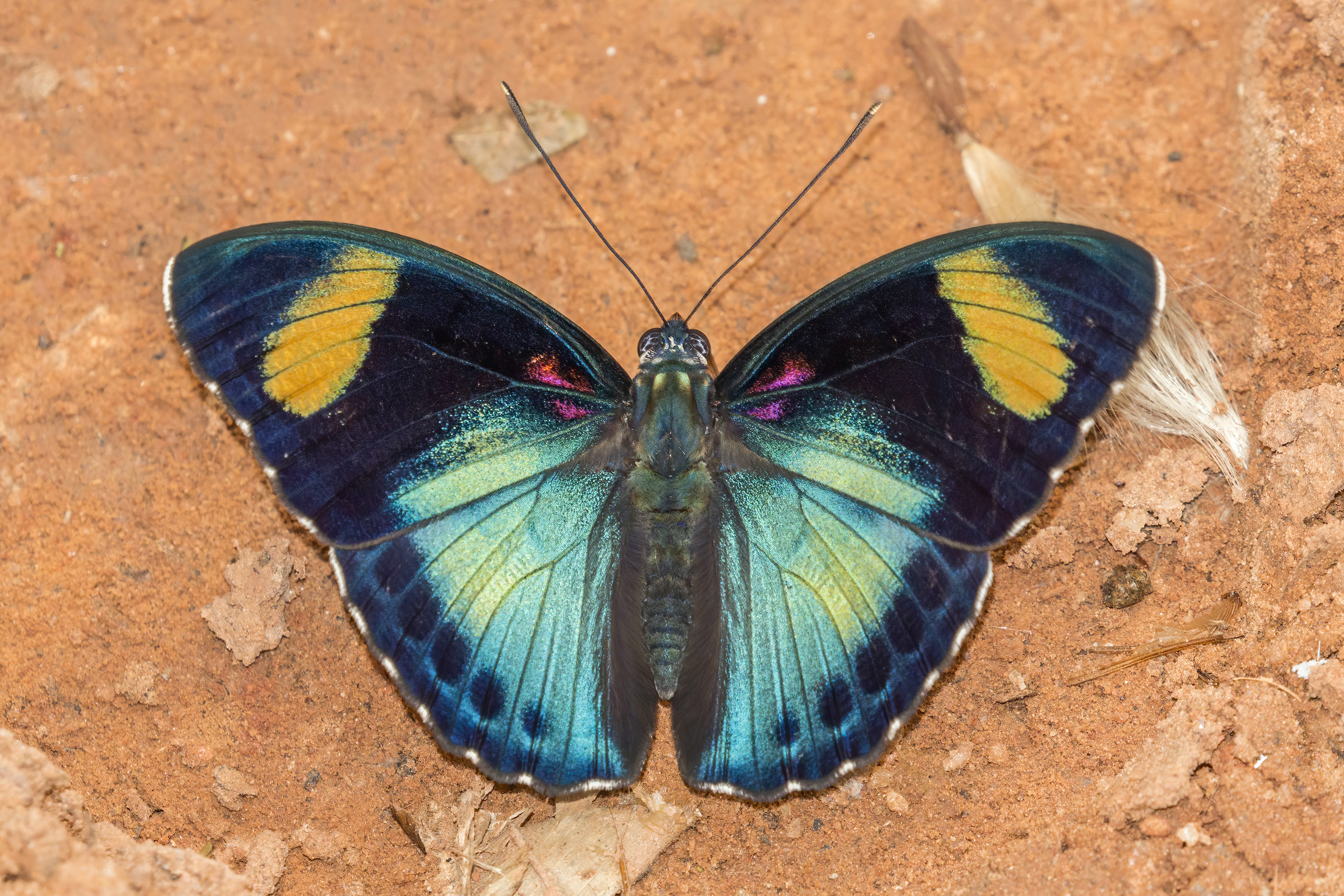
- Male, Bobiri Butterfly Sanctuary, Ghana

Conservation status
- Least Concern (IUCN 3.1)

Scientific classification
- Kingdom: Animalia
- Phylum: Arthropoda
- Clade: Pancrustacea
- Class: Insecta
- Order: Lepidoptera
- Family: Nymphalidae
- Genus: Euphaedra
- Species: E. themis

Binomial name
- Euphaedra themis (Hübner, 1807)

Synonyms
- Najas themis Hübner, 1807; Euphaedra (Euphaedrana) themis; Euphaedra themis var. viridifasciata Schultze, 1920; Euphaedra themis var. paupera Schultze, 1920; Euphaedra themis ab. albida Schultze, 1920; Euphaedra themis f. composita Wichgraf, 1921; Euphaedra themis f. illuminata Hecq, 1991

= Euphaedra themis =

Common Themis forester

Species of butterfly

Euphaedra themis, the Themis forester or orange-banded root forester, is a butterfly in the family Nymphalidae. It is found in West and Central Africa (Guinea, Sierra Leone, Liberia, Ivory Coast, Ghana, Togo, southern Benin, Nigeria, western Cameroon, the Republic of Congo, and Central African Republic).

== Subspecies ==
The Global Lepidoptera Index recognizes the following subspecies:

- Euphaedra themis auretta Gaede, 1916
- Euphaedra themis composita Wichgraf, 1921
- Euphaedra themis innocentia Staudinger, 1886
- Euphaedra themis inornata Rebel
- Euphaedra themis paupera Schultze, 1920
- Euphaedra themis viridifasciata Schultze, 1920

== Description ==
E. themis agrees with the preceding species [ Euphaedra cyparissa ] in the strongly developed black markings on the under surface, but the submarginal spots on the forewing beneath are placed in a quite straight line and the discal spot in cellule 2 is elongate and stands in the middle of the cellule, or at least reaches the middle. The wings have a black ground-colour above and are green, blue, orange-yellow or whitish to beyond the middle of the hindwing and at the hindmargin of the forewing. The species embraces a large number of aberrations which intergrade without any sharp demarcation, but can usually be distinguished by the characters cited here. themis Hbn. (43 c). Forewing beneath with distinct light subapical band and above with red spot at the base; the subapical band on the upperside of the forewing is in the male gold-yellow, in the female yellow or whitish, moderately large, of uniform breadth or narrower at the costal margin, and consists of 3 or 4 spots in cellules 3–6. Sierra Leone to the Congo. – ab. permixtum Btlr. [now species Euphaedra permixtum] only differs in having the subapical band of the forewing composed of only two spots, in cellules 3 and 4. Gaboon. – ab. justitia Stgr. [ now species Euphaedra justitia] only differs from the preceding in having the yellow subapical band of the forewing very broad and rounded. Lagos to Gaboon. – ab. adonina Hew. (44 b) [now species Euphaedra adonina] has the hindmarginal spot of the forewing and the basal part of the hindwing above orange-yellow and the apex of the forewing more than usually produced, but otherwise agrees with justitia. Old Calabar- ab. janetta Btlr. [ now species Euphaedra janetta] The forewing above without red at the base; its subapical band on both surfaces gold-yellow or yellowish; both wings beneath violet-red at the base. Ashanti to Cameroons. -ab. reducta Bartel [ now synonym of Euphaedra janetta] (Butler, 1871) differs from janetta in not having the forewing beneath red at the base. Cameroons – ab. aureola Kirby (43 c, d) [ now species Euphaedra aureola] is also near to janetta, but the red spot at the base of the under surface is not violet-red but brick-red. Cameroons. – ab. campaspe Fldr. [now species Euphaedra campaspe] The subapical band of the forewing beneath distinct and white, above in the male green, in the female white; the discal spots of the under surface black and distinct; on the upper surface the hindmarginal spot of the forewing and the basal part of the hindwing are dark green in the male, light green to greenish white in the female; the forewing above without red, but beneath red in the basal half of the cell. Gaboon, Congo, Angola.- ab. niveovittata Auriv. (44 b) [now species Euphaedra niveovittata] approaches the preceding form, but differs from it and from all the other forms of themis in having the black discal spots of the under surface absent or small and indistinct. The subapical band of the forewing is beneath white, but above light green in the male and white in the female; the large hindmarginal spot on the upperside of the forewing and the basal part of the hindwing above are golden yellow in the male, nearly white in the female; on the under surface the black spots in the cells are distinct, but the submarginal spots smaller than usual; the hindwing has the spot at the base of the costal margin brick-red and in cellule 7 a white longitudinal stripe, which is joined posteriorly to a white median transverse band; in the female the basal half of the forewing and the greater part of the hindwing are white or whitish beneath; forewing above without red at the base. Southern Congo. The last three forms differ from the rest in the forewing having a uniform green ground-colour beneath, without light subapical band; on the upper surface both the subapical band and the hindmarginal spot of the forewing are uniform dark green, as is also the basal part of the hindwing; the forewing above not red at the base; the black discal spots of the under surface are large and sharply marked and the hindwing in the middle broadly golden yellow or yellowish; the base of the costal margin of the hindwing is violet-red. – ab. normalis Stgr. (43 d). [ now species Euphaedra normalis] The discal spots on the underside of the forewing are very large and are placed in a row vertically to the hindmargin, hence nearly parallel with the distal margin; the subapical band on the upper surface is completely separated from the hindmarginal spot. Sierra Leone. – ab. aberrans Stgr. [ now species Euphaedra aberrans only differs from normalis in having the subapical band of the forewhig joined to the hindmarginal spot by a large green spot in cellule 2. Sierra Leone. – ab. vetusta Btlr. (44 a) [ now species Euphaedra vetusta] is distinguished from the two preceding by having the discal spots on the forewing beneath placed in an oblique row running towards the hinder angle. Sierra Leone and Congo.

== Biology ==
The habitat consists of drier forests and disturbed forests. The larvae have been reported to feed on Deinbollia pinnata, although this record possibly applies to Euphaedra laboureana.

Torben Larsen developed a species numbering system for his 2005 publication Butterflies of West Africa. This species is #1066. The 'Larsen' numbers have since been used with permission in A Sharp Eye on Butterflies of Ghana.

== Etymology ==
The specific name themis is derived from the greek goddess Themis.
