= Orgyia leucostigma sablensis =

Conservation status
- Imperiled (NatureServe)

Scientific classification
- Domain: Eukaryota
- Kingdom: Animalia
- Phylum: Arthropoda
- Class: Insecta
- Order: Lepidoptera
- Superfamily: Noctuoidea
- Family: Erebidae
- Genus: Orgyia
- Species: O. leucostigma
- Subspecies: O. l. sablensis

Trinomial name
- Orgyia leucostigma sablensis Neil, 1979

Subspecies of moth

Orgyia leucostigma sablensis is a subspecies of Orgyia leucostigma, the white-marked tussock moth, found only on Sable Island in Nova Scotia, Canada. The subspecies was first described by Kenneth Neil in 1979.

== Description ==
=== Physical ===
O. l. sablensis shares many common characteristics with its mainland counterpart, O. l. plagiata. Males and females of O. l. sablensis share the same antennae, palpi, genitalia and vestiture as O. l. plagiata. Males of the subspecies have a rusty brown coloured forewing and have marking similar to that O. l. plagiata but are generally less distinctive. The grey colouring found on the median area of O. l. plagiata are generally absent in males on Sable Island, reduced to a small patch of colouring or absent altogether. The discal dot for males of the subspecies is obscure and indistinct. The undersides of both wings in males are a rusty brown colour, while the upper-sides are a solid rusty brown. Females of the subspecies are a very light grey colour, and have small wing pads present.

=== Behavior ===
Like O. l. plagiata, O. l. sablensis has a flight period that occurs from late July to mid-September. The subspecies is a general feeder, and its larva has been found in blueberry, cranberry, bayberry and several species of sedges and grasses.

== Conservation ==
The subspecies does not appear to face short-term threats and is currently common. However, it is threatened in the long term by sea level rise.

== See also ==
- Agrotis arenarius
