= Orgyia magna =

Scientific classification
- Domain: Eukaryota
- Kingdom: Animalia
- Phylum: Arthropoda
- Class: Insecta
- Order: Lepidoptera
- Superfamily: Noctuoidea
- Family: Erebidae
- Tribe: Orgyiini
- Genus: Orgyia
- Species: O. magna

Binomial name
- Orgyia magna Ferguson, 1977

Species of moth

Orgyia magna is a species of tussock moth in the family Erebidae. It is found in North America.

The MONA or Hodges number for Orgyia magna is 8310.
