= Orgyia viridescens =

Scientific classification
- Kingdom: Animalia
- Phylum: Arthropoda
- Class: Insecta
- Order: Lepidoptera
- Superfamily: Noctuoidea
- Family: Erebidae
- Genus: Orgyia
- Species: O. viridescens

Binomial name
- Orgyia viridescens (Walker, 1855)

Synonyms
- Acyphas viridescens Walker, 1855; Notolophus viridescens Swinhoe, 1923

Species of moth

Orgyia viridescens is a moth of the family Erebidae first described by Francis Walker in 1855. It is found in Sri Lanka.
