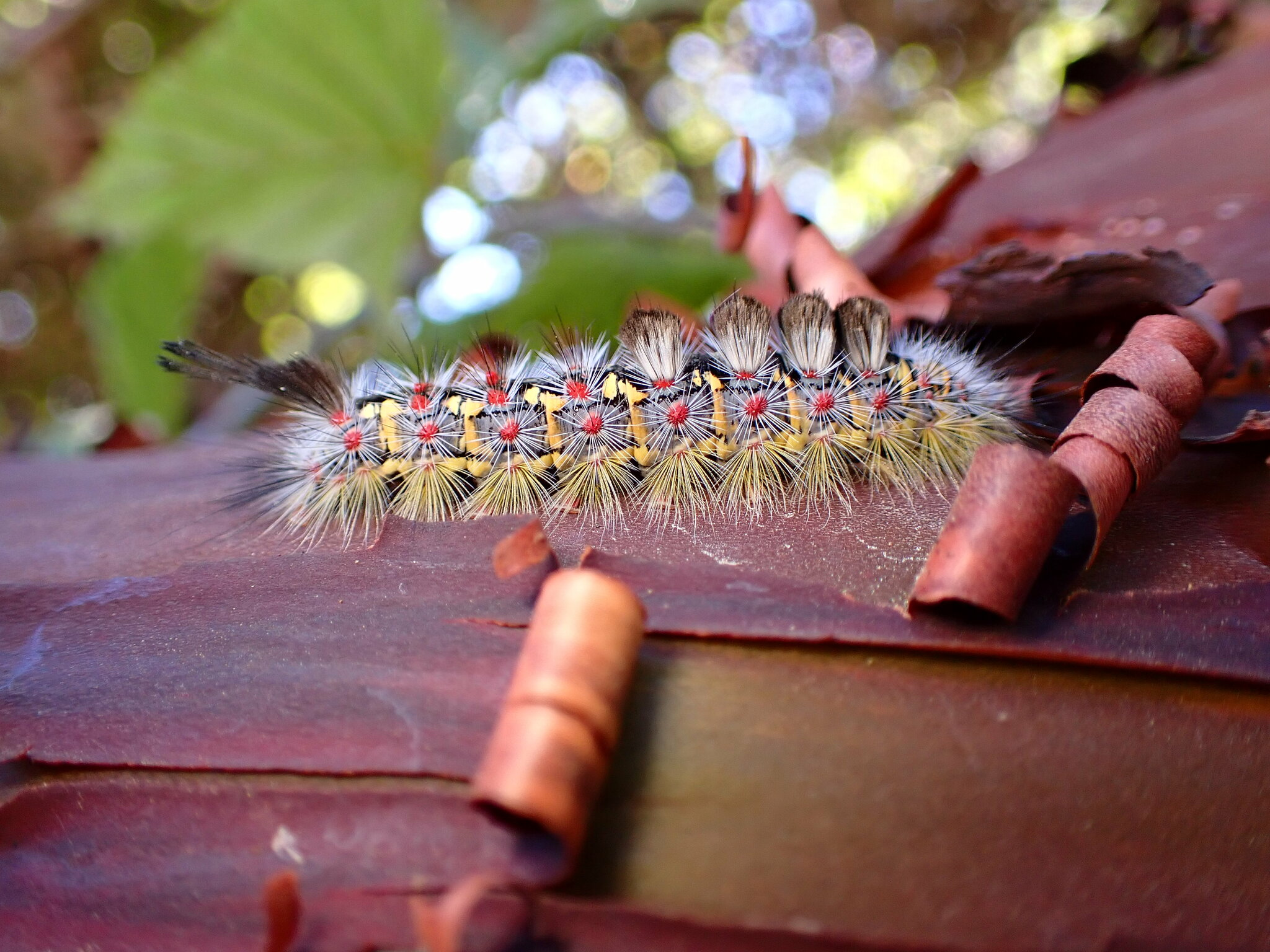
- Western Tussock Moth caterpillar on madrone or manzanita, San Mateo County, California, 2022

Scientific classification
- Kingdom: Animalia
- Phylum: Arthropoda
- Clade: Pancrustacea
- Class: Insecta
- Order: Lepidoptera
- Superfamily: Noctuoidea
- Family: Erebidae
- Genus: Orgyia
- Species: O. vetusta

Binomial name
- Orgyia vetusta Boisduval, 1852

= Western tussock moth =

Species of moth

Orgyia vetusta, also known as the western tussock moth, formerly Hemerocampa vetusta, is a moth found in the Pacific States and British Columbia. The species is dimorphic; the females are flightless.

The Western tussock moth is reported on virtually all California oak species as well as various fruit and nut trees, ceanothus, hawthorn, manzanita, pyracantha, toyon, walnut, and willow. There is an isolated population in Boise County, Idaho. This species has also been seen in U.S. gulf coast states such as Louisiana..

== Life history ==
Tussock moth eggs are white and are laid in a mass, which overwinters. The female covers the eggs with setae. The caterpillars emerge in early spring (February-May) and exhibit minimal disperse via ballooning, a process by while caterpillars hang from silk threads and are spread by wind. This is also observed in other species within the family Erebidae, such as Lymantria dispar dispar. Larvae have hairs that may cause minor skin irritation or allergic reactions in humans. Adults emerge from cocoons between June and August.

== Human Interactions ==
=== Pest Status ===
Tussock moth caterpillars can cause damage to citrus orchards in Southern California.

== Additional images ==
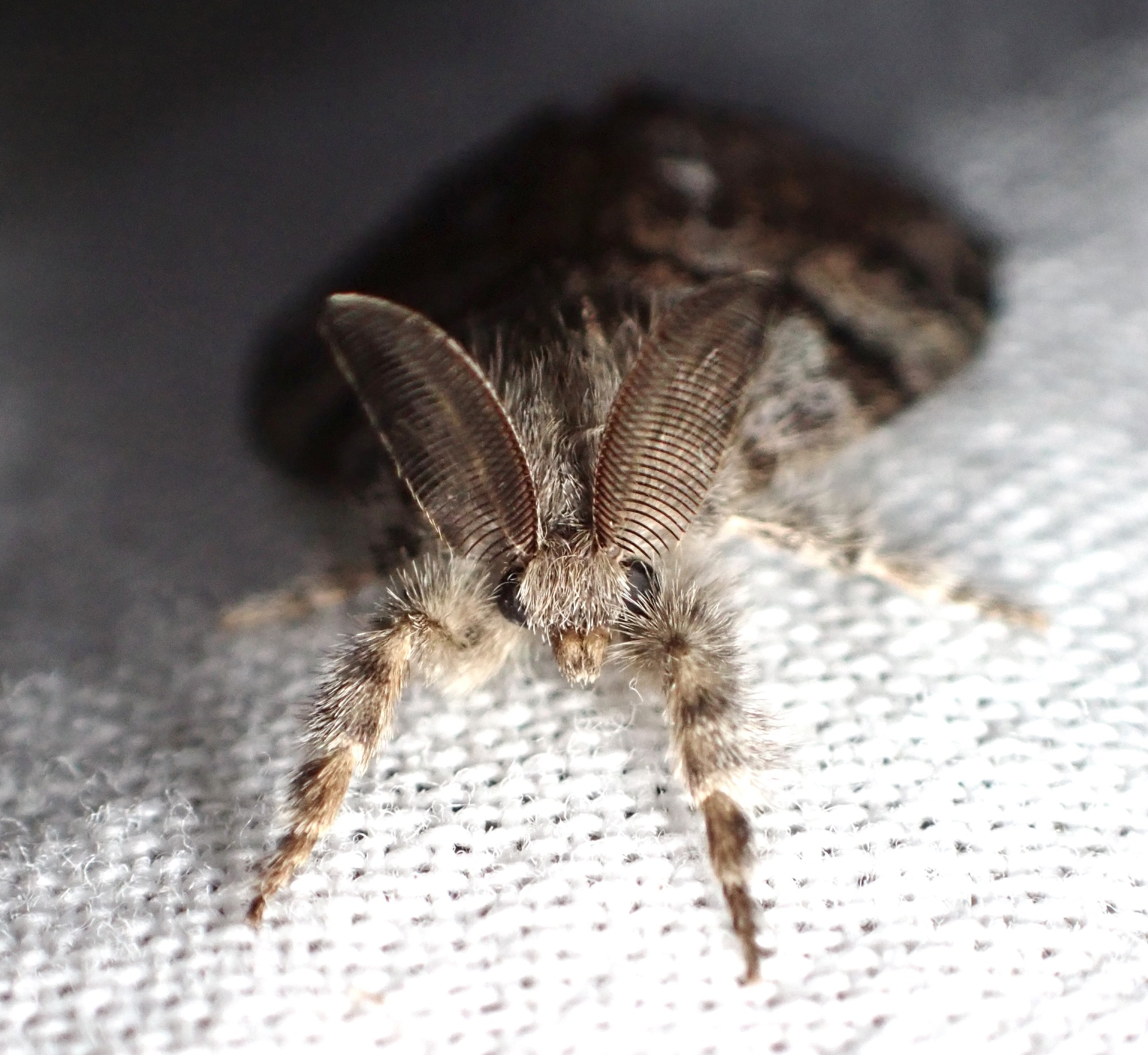
Male moth

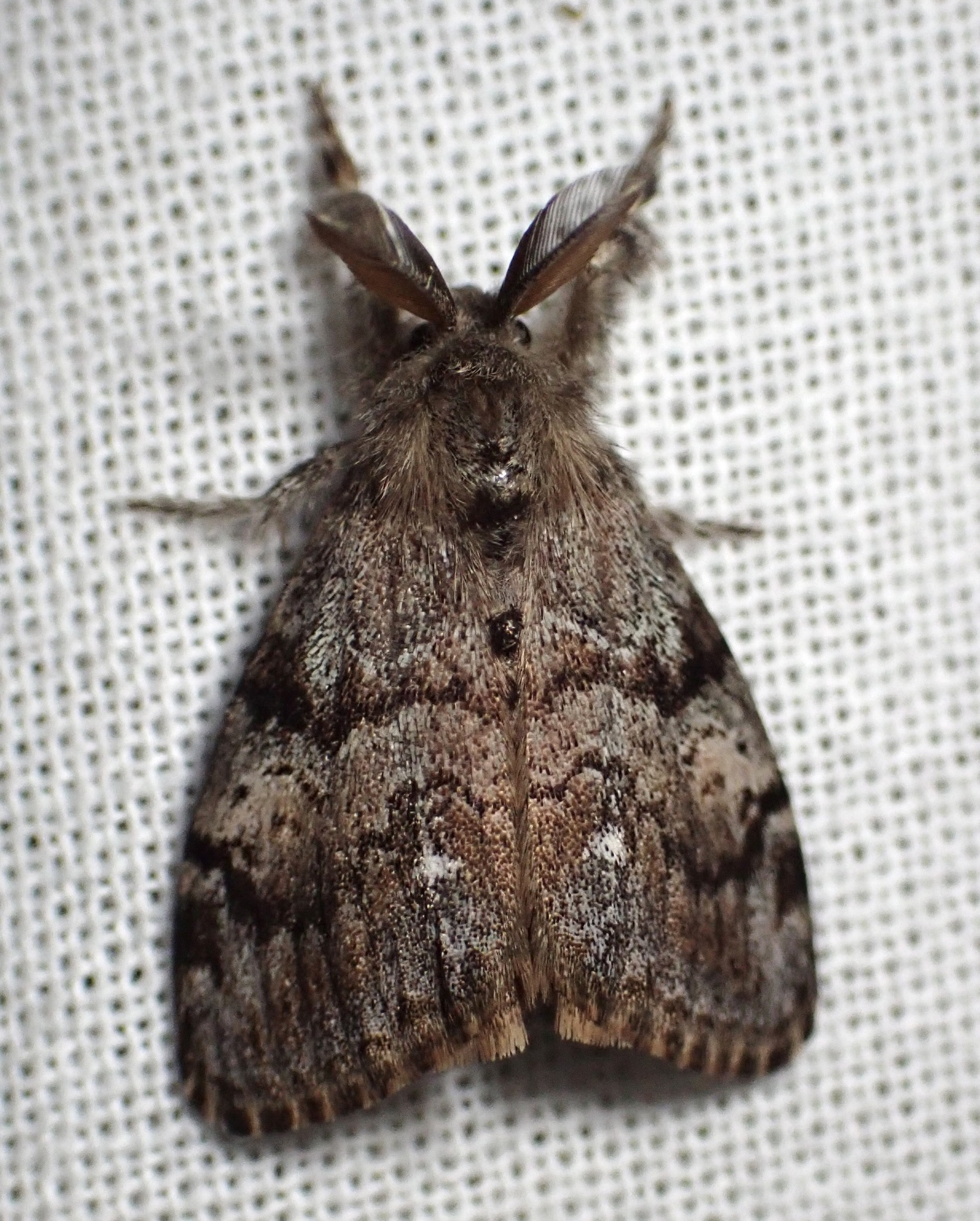
Male moth

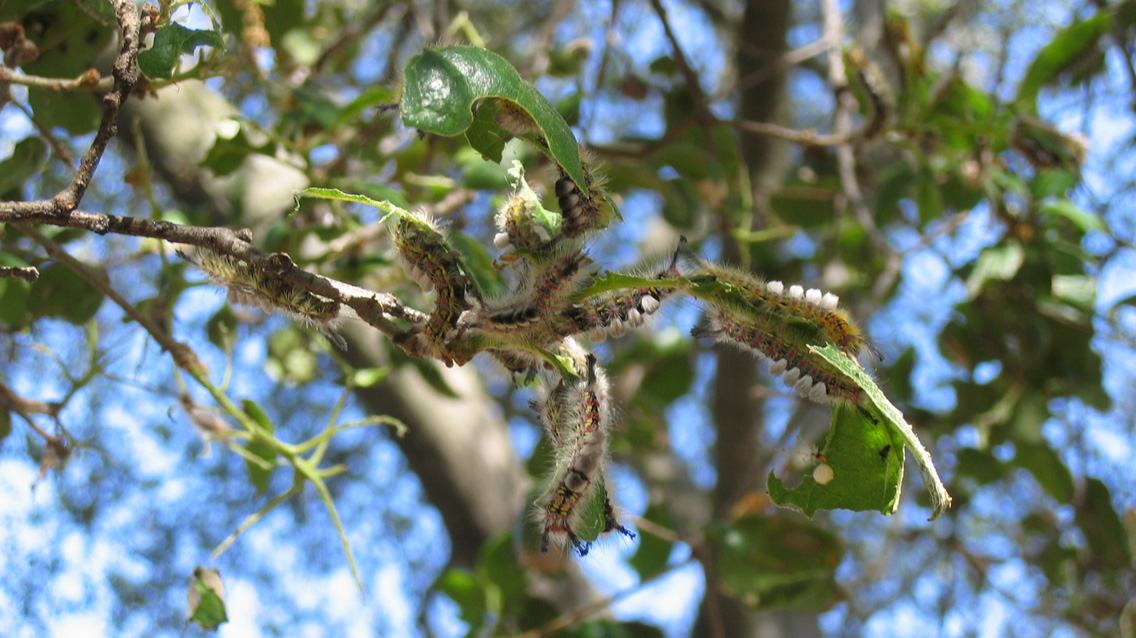
Tussock larva on coast live oak
