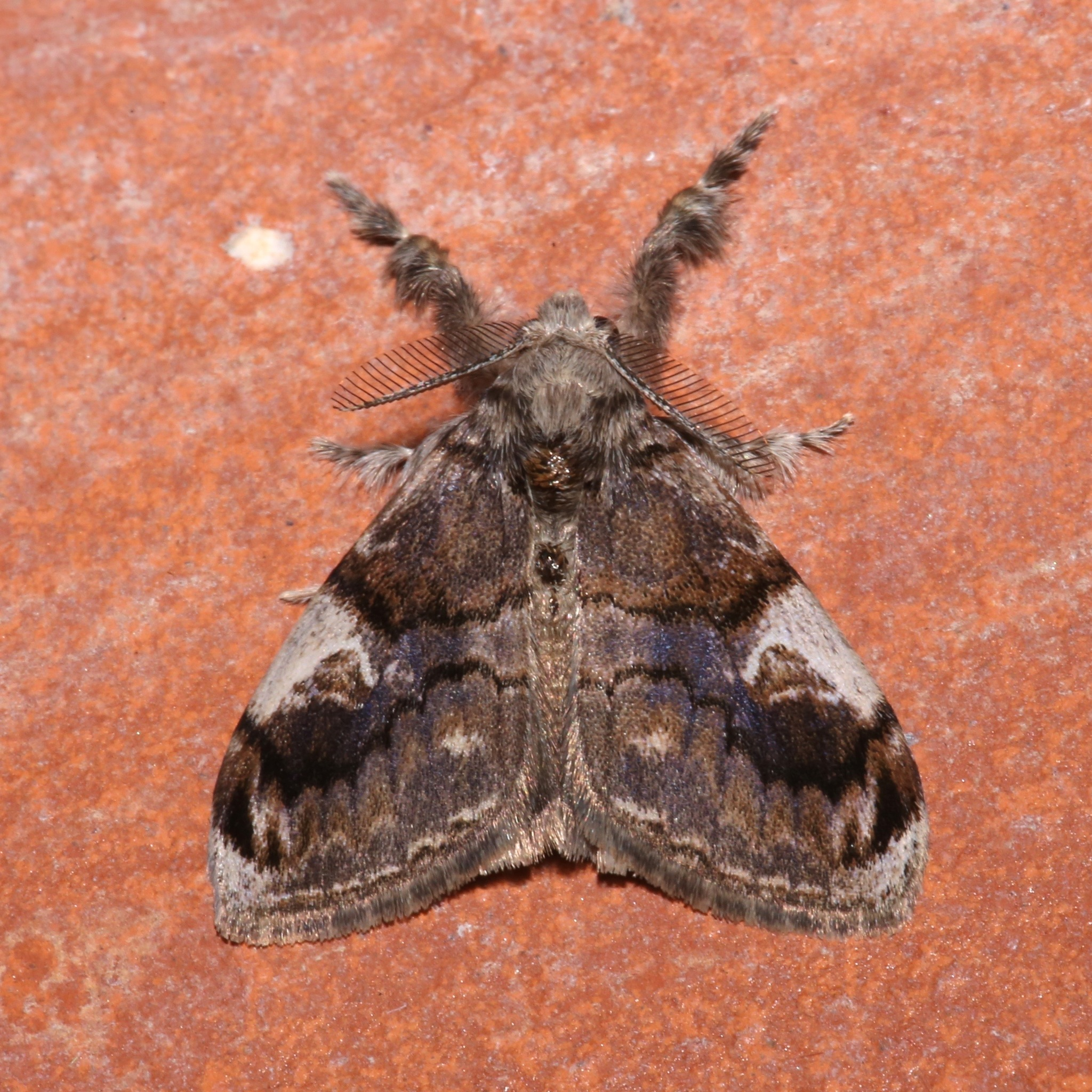

Scientific classification
- Domain: Eukaryota
- Kingdom: Animalia
- Phylum: Arthropoda
- Class: Insecta
- Order: Lepidoptera
- Superfamily: Noctuoidea
- Family: Erebidae
- Genus: Orgyia
- Species: O. falcata

Binomial name
- Orgyia falcata Schaus, 1896

= Orgyia falcata =

Species of moth

Orgyia falcata is a species of tussock moth in the family Erebidae. It is found in North America.

The MONA or Hodges number for Orgyia falcata is 8317.
