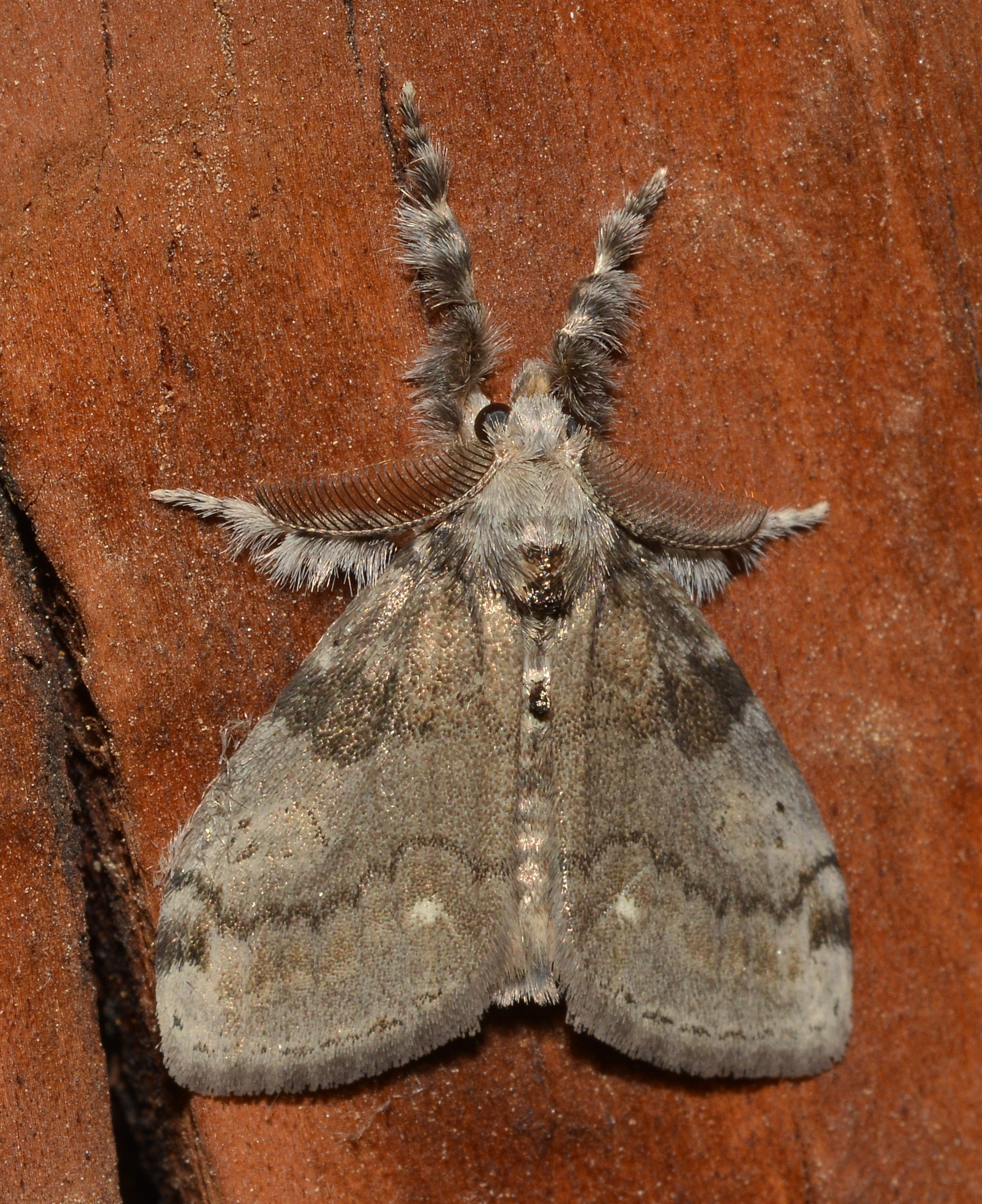
- Adult
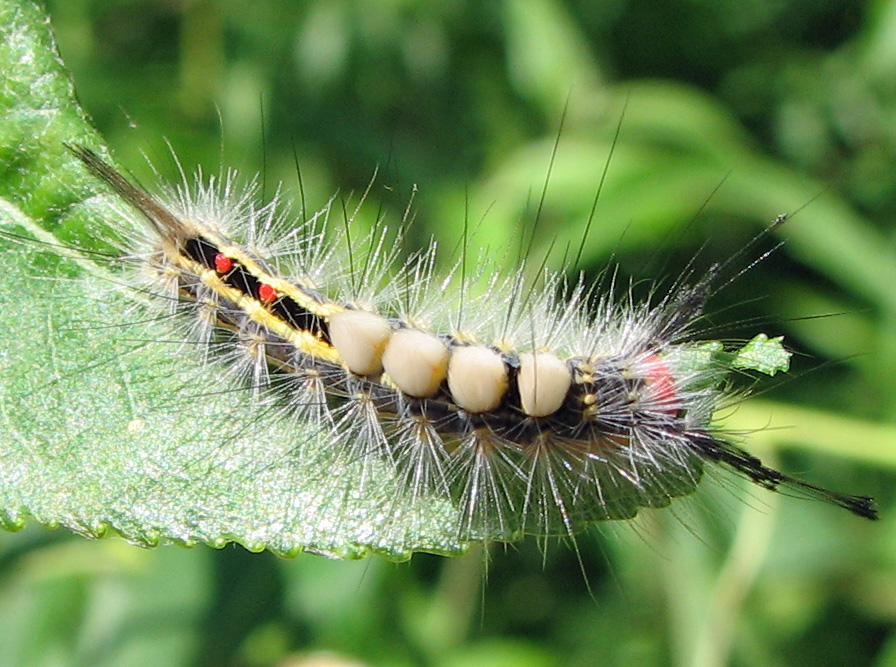
- Larva

Scientific classification
- Domain: Eukaryota
- Kingdom: Animalia
- Phylum: Arthropoda
- Class: Insecta
- Order: Lepidoptera
- Superfamily: Noctuoidea
- Family: Erebidae
- Genus: Orgyia
- Species: O. leucostigma

Binomial name
- Orgyia leucostigma (J. E. Smith, 1797)

Synonyms
- Phalaena leucostigma J. E. Smith, 1797; Hemerocampa leucostigma; Cladophora leucographa Geyer, 1832; Acyphas plagiata Walker, 1855; Orgyia wardi Riotte, 1971; Orgyia oslari Barnes, 1900; Orgyia libera Strecker, 1900

= Orgyia leucostigma =

White-marked tussock moth

Species of moth

Orgyia leucostigma, the white-marked tussock moth, is a moth in the family Erebidae. The species was first described by James Edward Smith in 1797. The caterpillar is very common especially in late summer in eastern North America, extending as far west as Texas, California, and Alberta.

== Etymology ==
The genus name Orgyia is from the ancient Greek word ὄργυια, órgyia - 'outstretched arms'. So named because, when at rest, the moth stretches forward its forelegs like arms.

== Life cycle ==
Two or more generations occur per year in eastern North America. They overwinter in the egg stage.

=== Eggs ===
Eggs are laid in a single mass over the cocoon of the female, and covered in a froth. Up to 300 eggs are laid at a time.

=== Larvae ===
The larvae are brightly colored, with tufts of hair-like setae. The head is bright red and the body has yellow or white stripes, with a black stripe along the middle of the back. Bright red defensive glands are seen on the hind end of the back. Four white toothbrush-like tufts stand out from the back, and a gray-brown hair pencil is at the hind end. The four white tufts on the larva's back may mimic the cocoons of parasitic wasps. Touching the hairs sets off an allergic reaction in many humans. Young larvae skeletonize the surface of the leaf, while older larvae eat everything except the larger veins. They grow to about 35 mm long.

=== Pupae ===
The caterpillars spin a grayish cocoon in bark crevices and incorporate setae in it. The moths emerge after two weeks.

=== Adults ===
The females have reduced wings and do not leave the vicinity of the cocoon. The males are gray with wavy black lines and a white spot on the forewings (the vapourer, Orgyia antiqua, is similar but is a rusty color.) The antennae are very feathery. Moths are found from June to October.

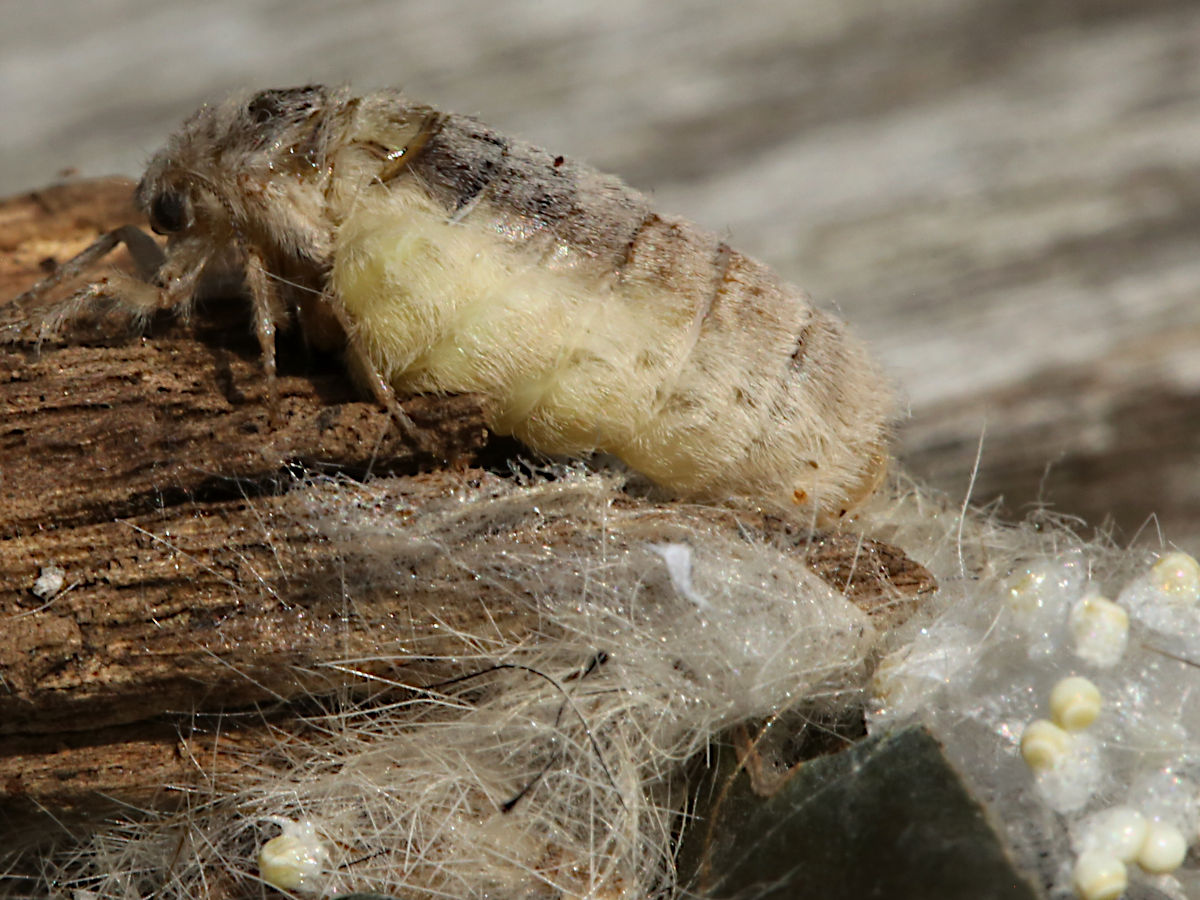
Wingless female with eggs

== Host plants ==
The caterpillars may be found feeding on an extremely wide variety of trees, both deciduous and coniferous, including apple, birch, black locust, cherry, elm, fir, hackberry, hemlock, hickory, larch, oak, rose, spruce, chestnut, and willow. Defoliating outbreaks are occasionally reported especially on Manitoba maple and elm in urban areas. Outbreaks are usually ended by viral disease.

== Ecology ==
The fungus Entomophaga maimaiga was introduced to North America to control the spongy moth (Lymantria dispar). The fungus also infects O. leucostigma and could possibly have an impact in years when E. maimaiga is abundant. Large larvae are mostly attacked by birds, and small larvae mostly disappear during dispersal.

== Subspecies ==
- O. l. leucostigma (South Carolina, from Georgia and Florida to Texas)
- O. l. intermedia Fitch, 1856 (from Maine and Ontario to Virginia, Alberta and Kansas)
- O. l. plagiata (Walker, 1855) (Nova Scotia, New Brunswick, Quebec)
- O. l. oslari Barnes, 1900 (New Mexico, Colorado)
- O. l. sablensis Niel, 1979 (Sable Island, Canada)

== Image gallery ==
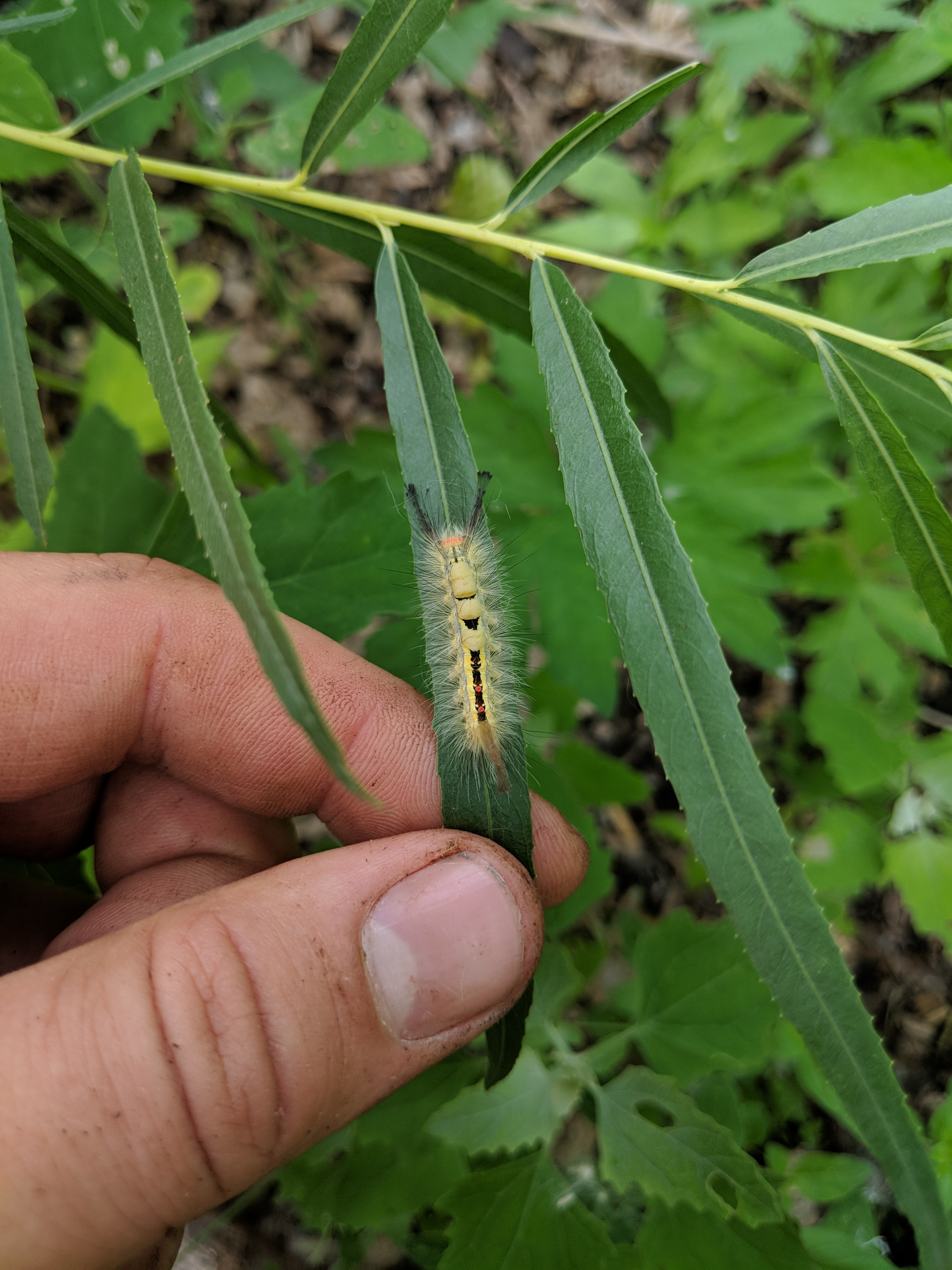
Larva

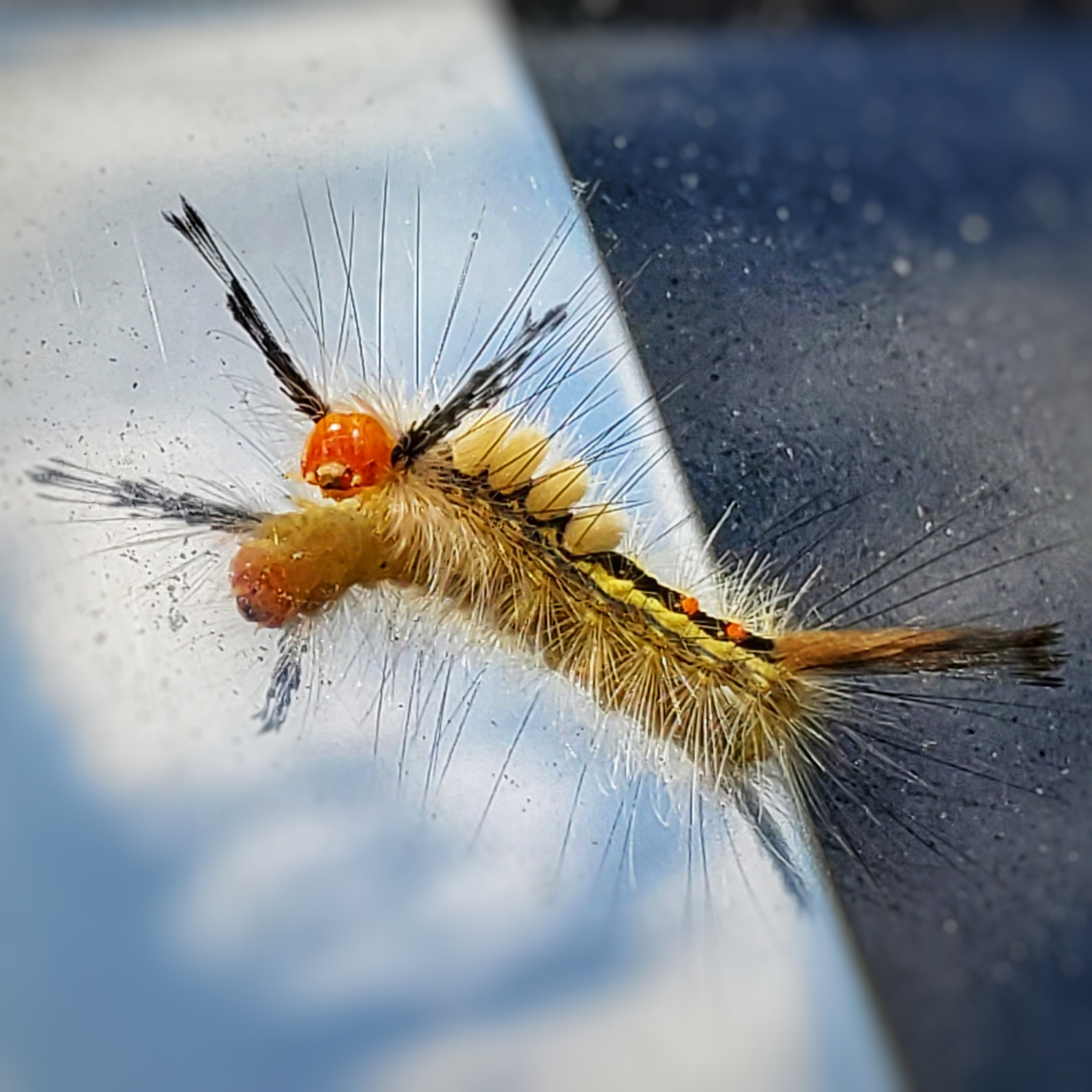
Larva

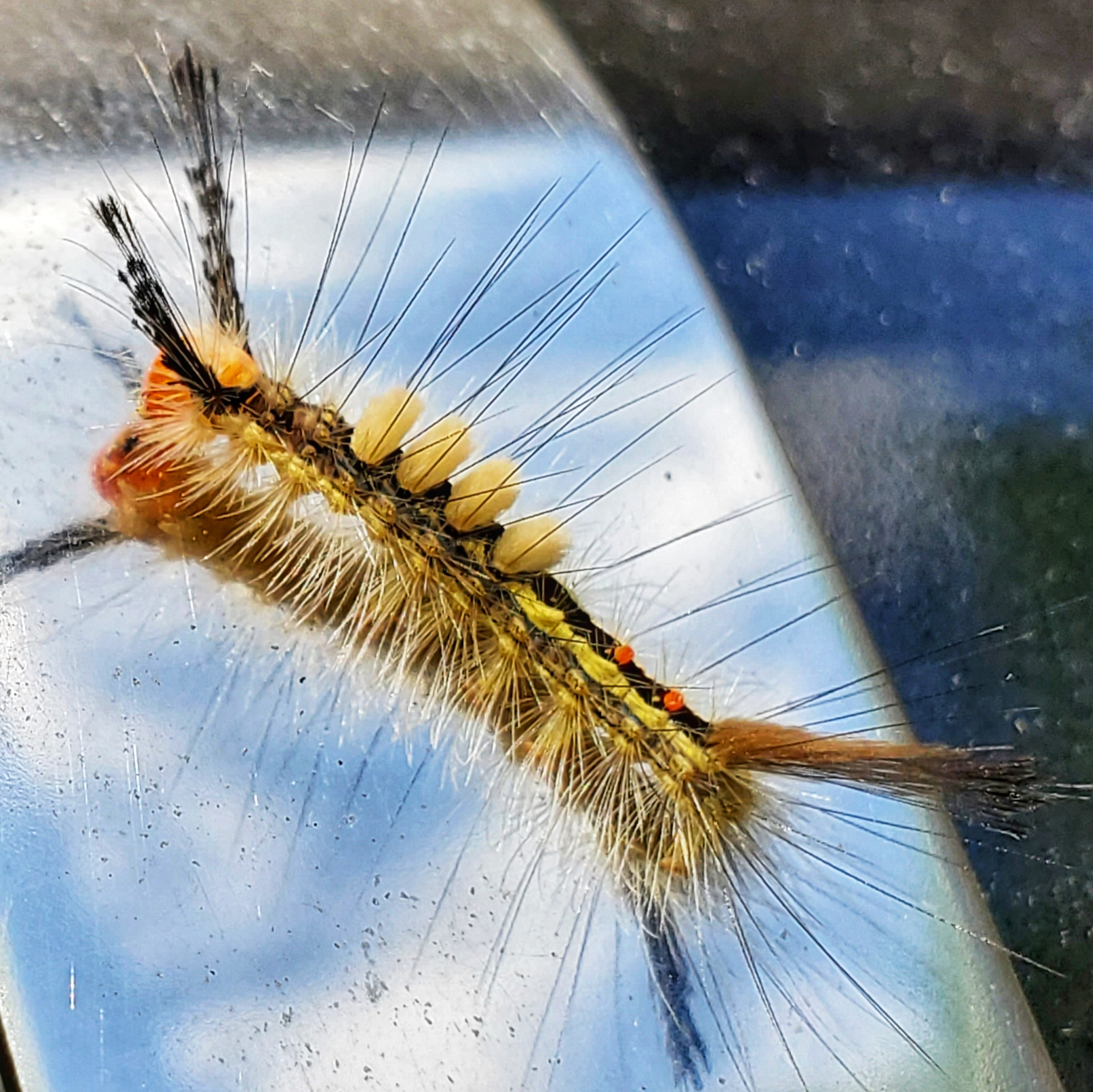
Larva

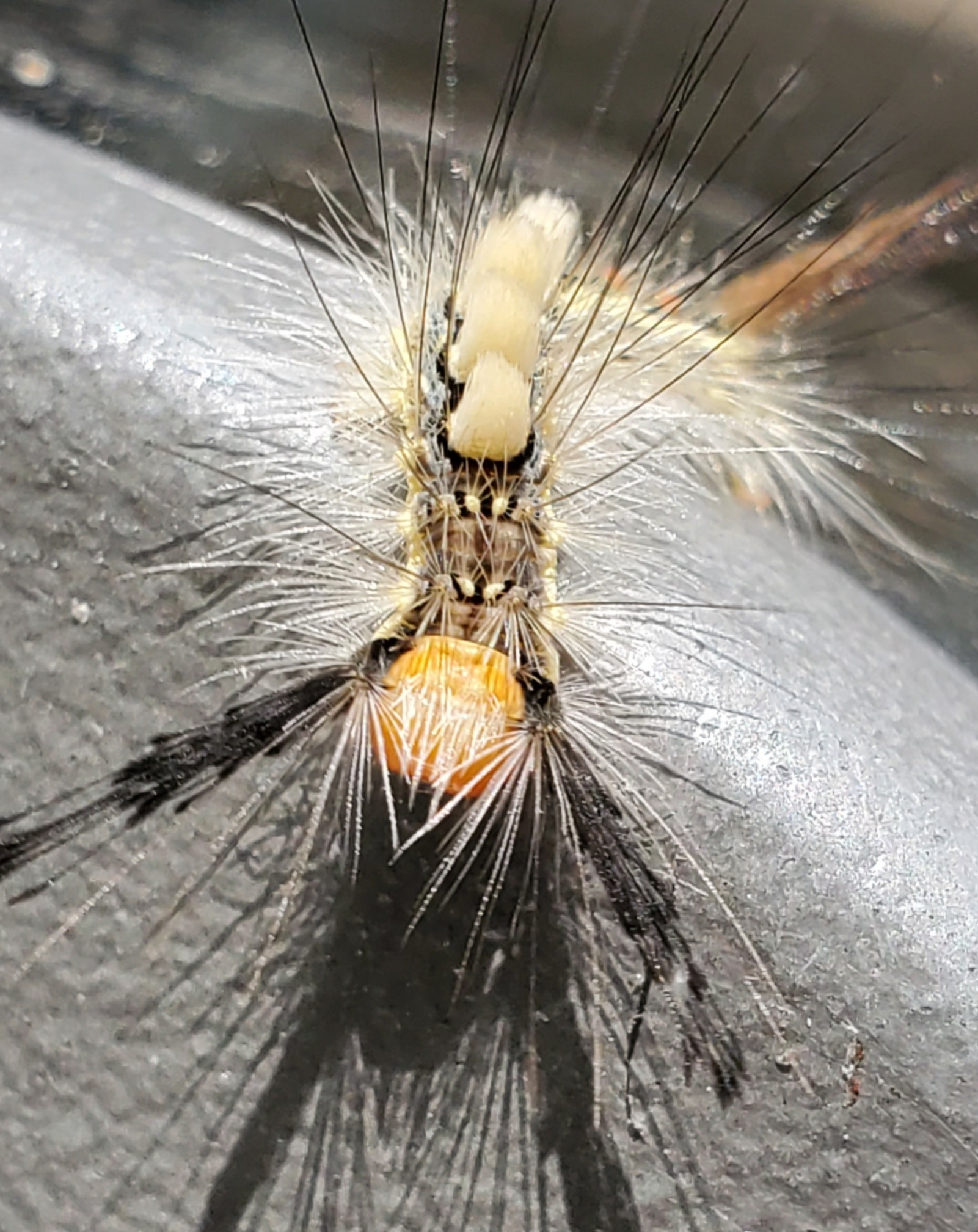
Larva

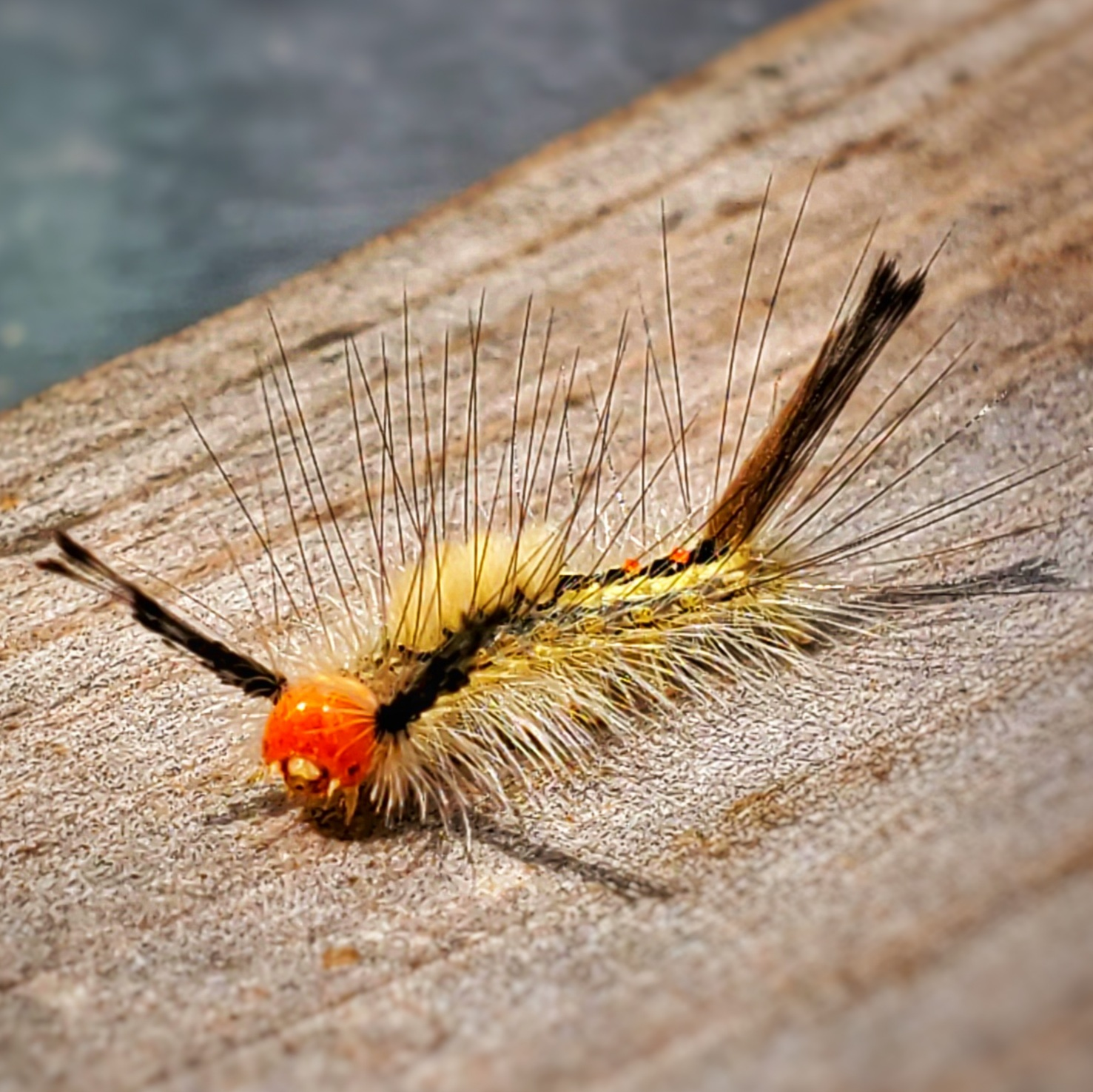
Larva

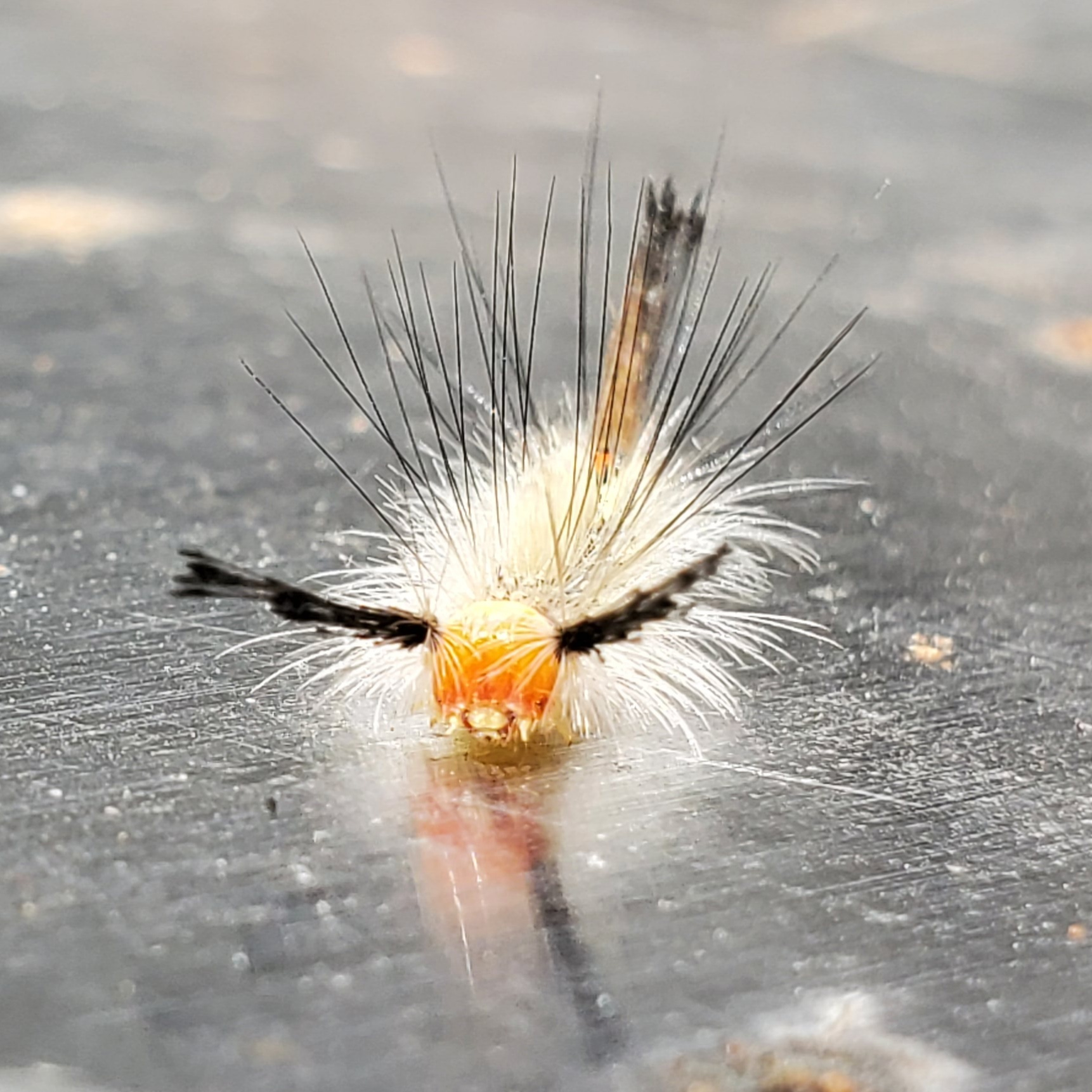
Larva

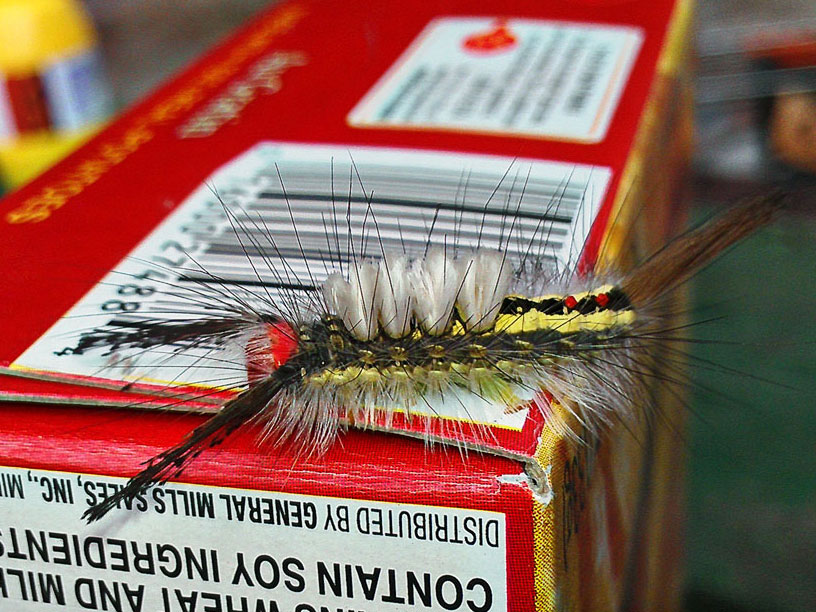
Caterpillar

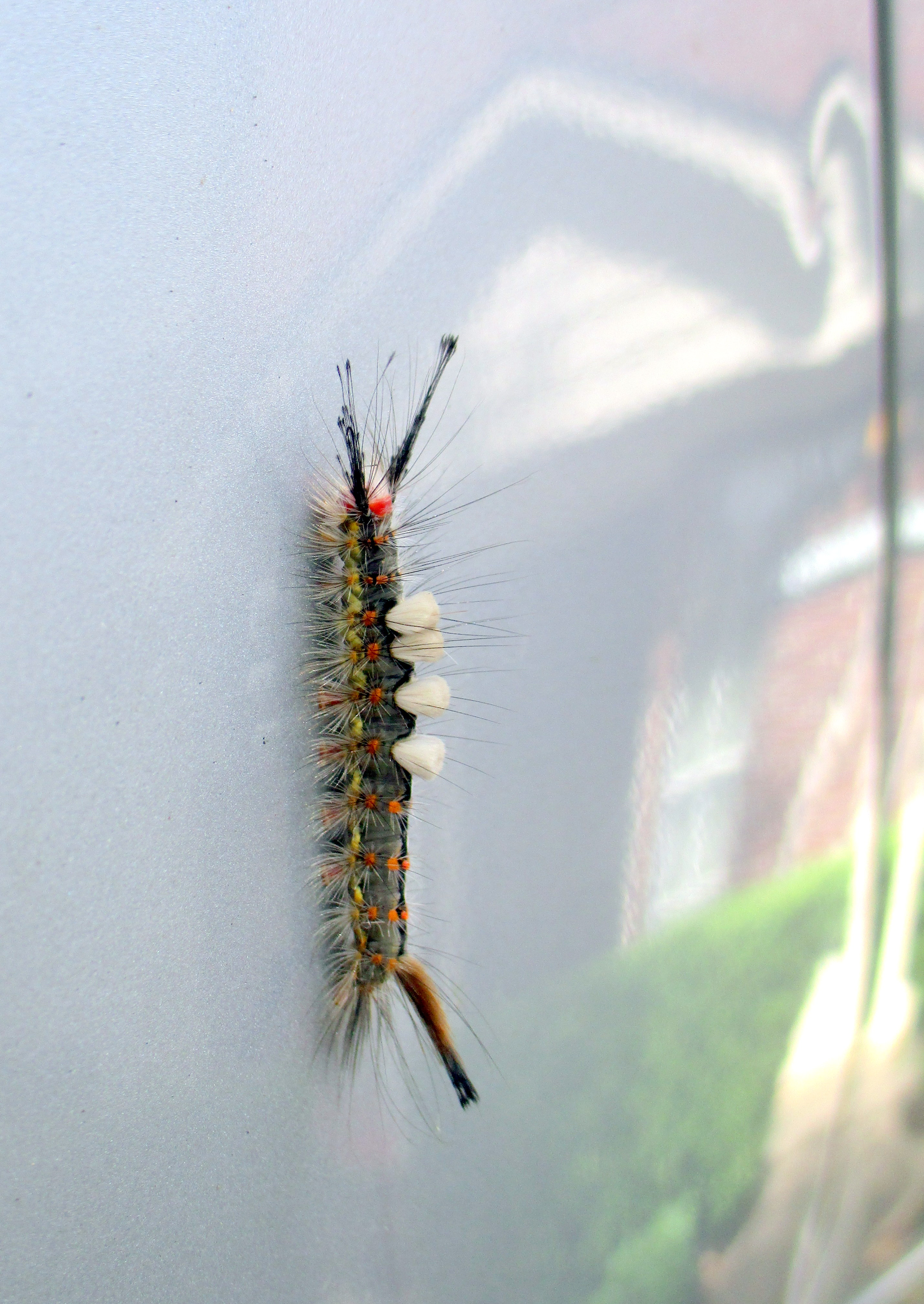
Caterpillar in Texas
