= Orgyia leuschneri =

Scientific classification
- Kingdom: Animalia
- Phylum: Arthropoda
- Clade: Pancrustacea
- Class: Insecta
- Order: Lepidoptera
- Superfamily: Noctuoidea
- Family: Erebidae
- Genus: Orgyia
- Species: O. leuschneri

Binomial name
- Orgyia leuschneri Riotte, 1972

Species of moth

Caterpillar of the Box-elder Tussock Moth (Orgyia leuschneri) in the United States

Orgyia leuschneri, the box-elder tussock moth, is a species of tussock moth in the family Erebidae. It is found in North America.

The MONA or Hodges number for Orgyia leuschneri is 8315.
