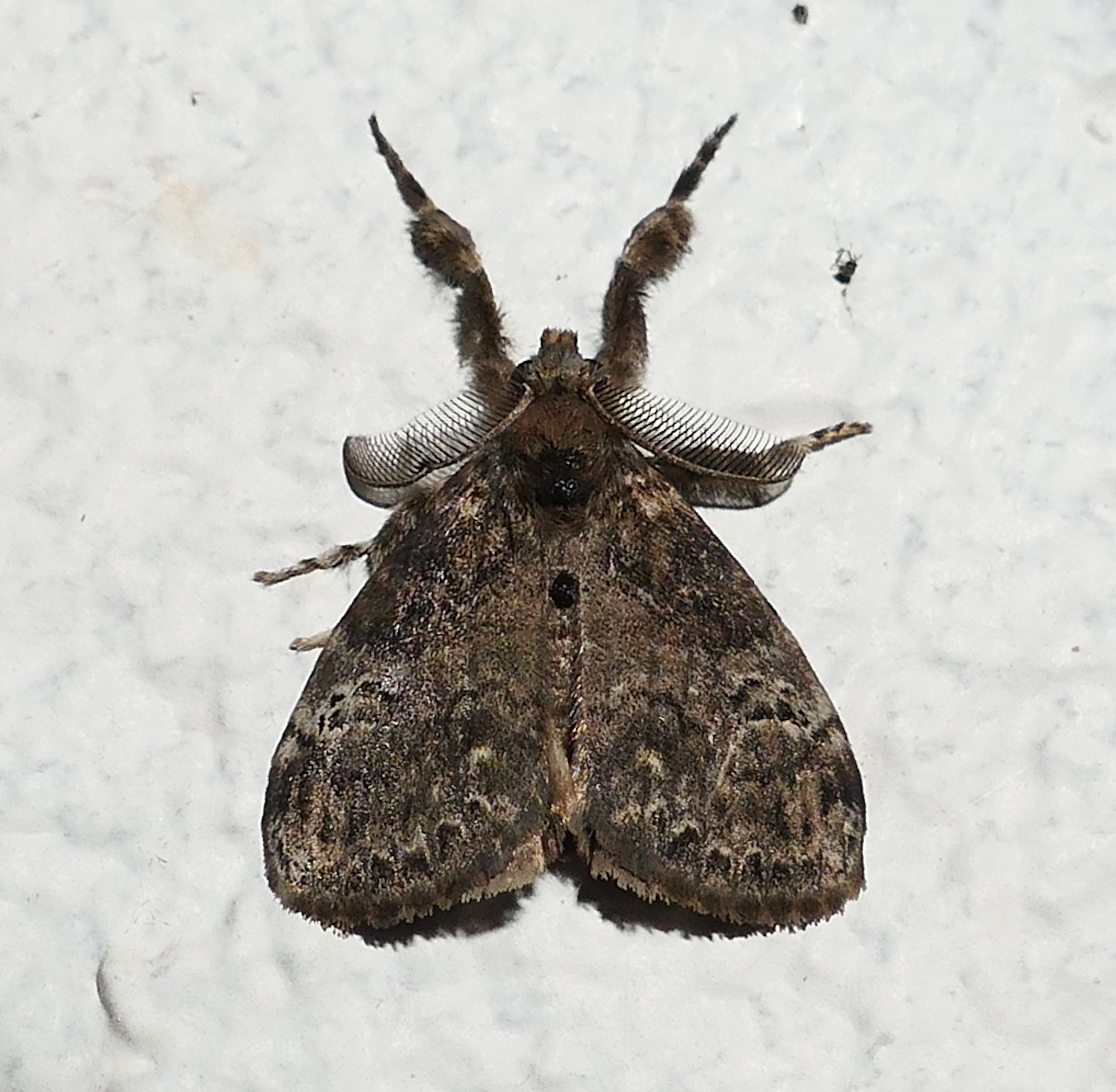

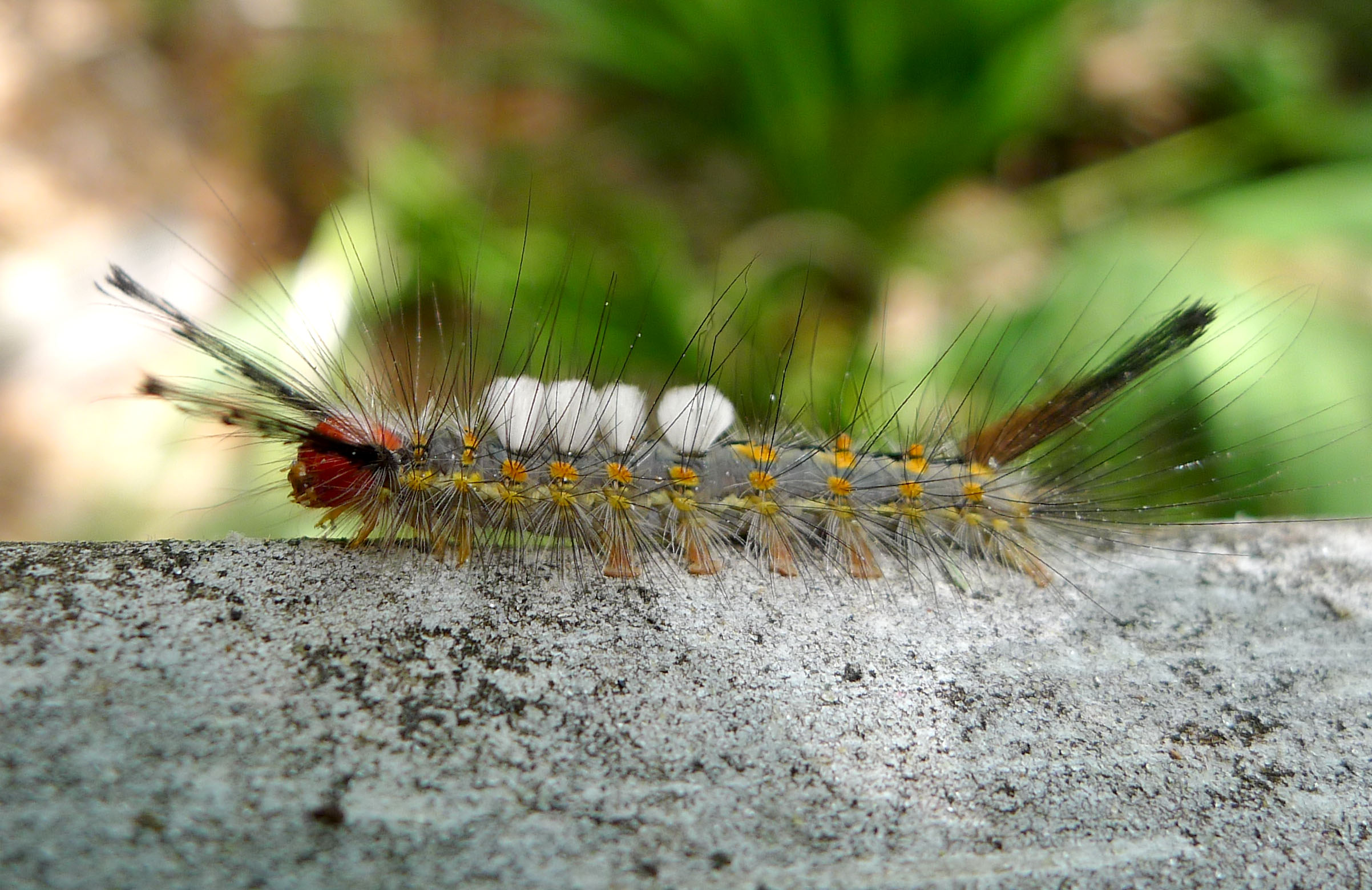
- Adult (top) and larva (lower)

Scientific classification
- Kingdom: Animalia
- Phylum: Arthropoda
- Clade: Pancrustacea
- Class: Insecta
- Order: Lepidoptera
- Superfamily: Noctuoidea
- Family: Erebidae
- Tribe: Orgyiini
- Genus: Orgyia
- Species: O. detrita

Binomial name
- Orgyia detrita Guérin-Méneville, 1831

= Orgyia detrita =

Species of moth

Orgyia detrita, the fir tussock moth or live oak tussock moth, is a tussock moth in the family Erebidae. The species was first described by Félix Édouard Guérin-Méneville in 1831. It is found in North America.
