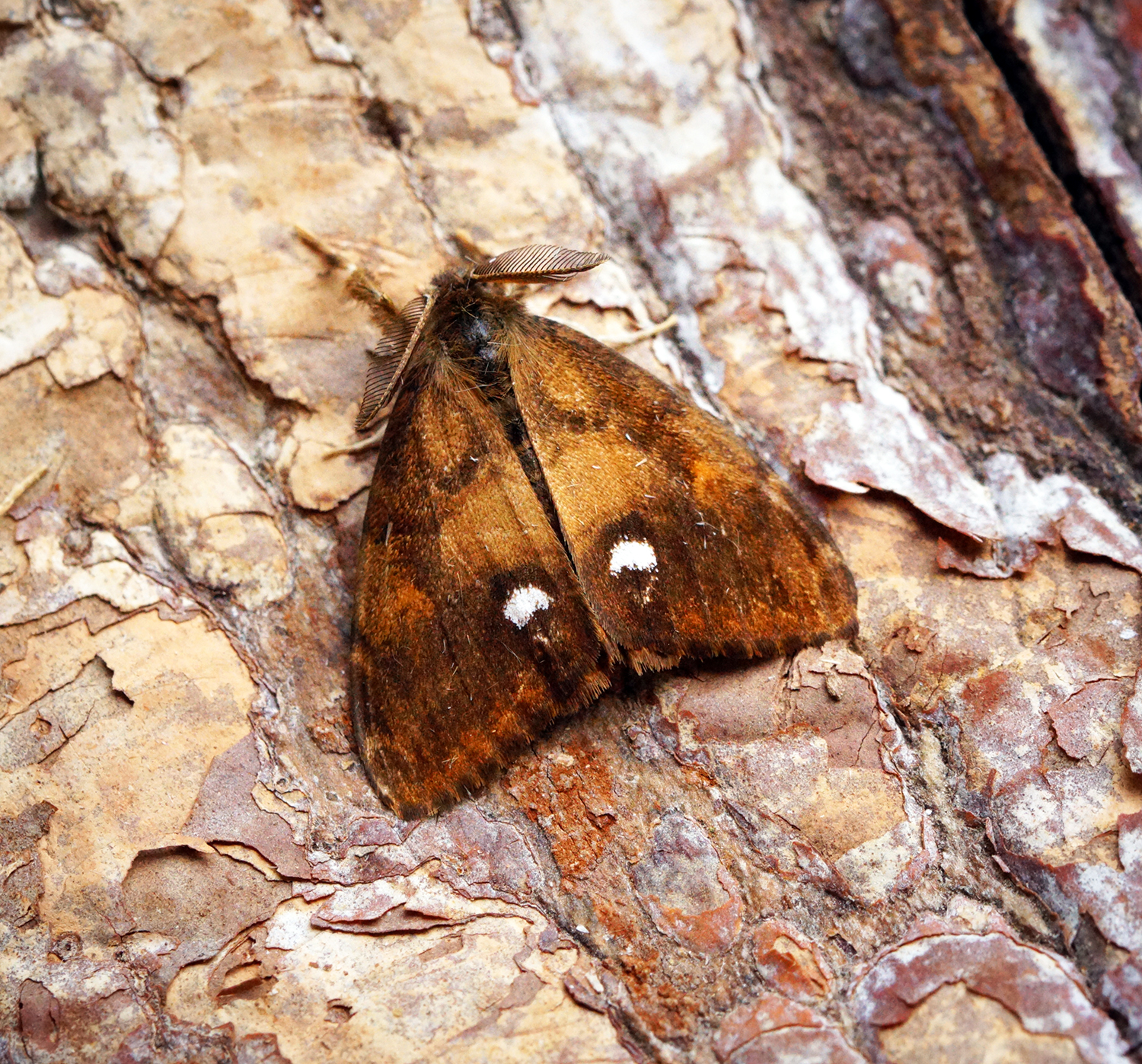

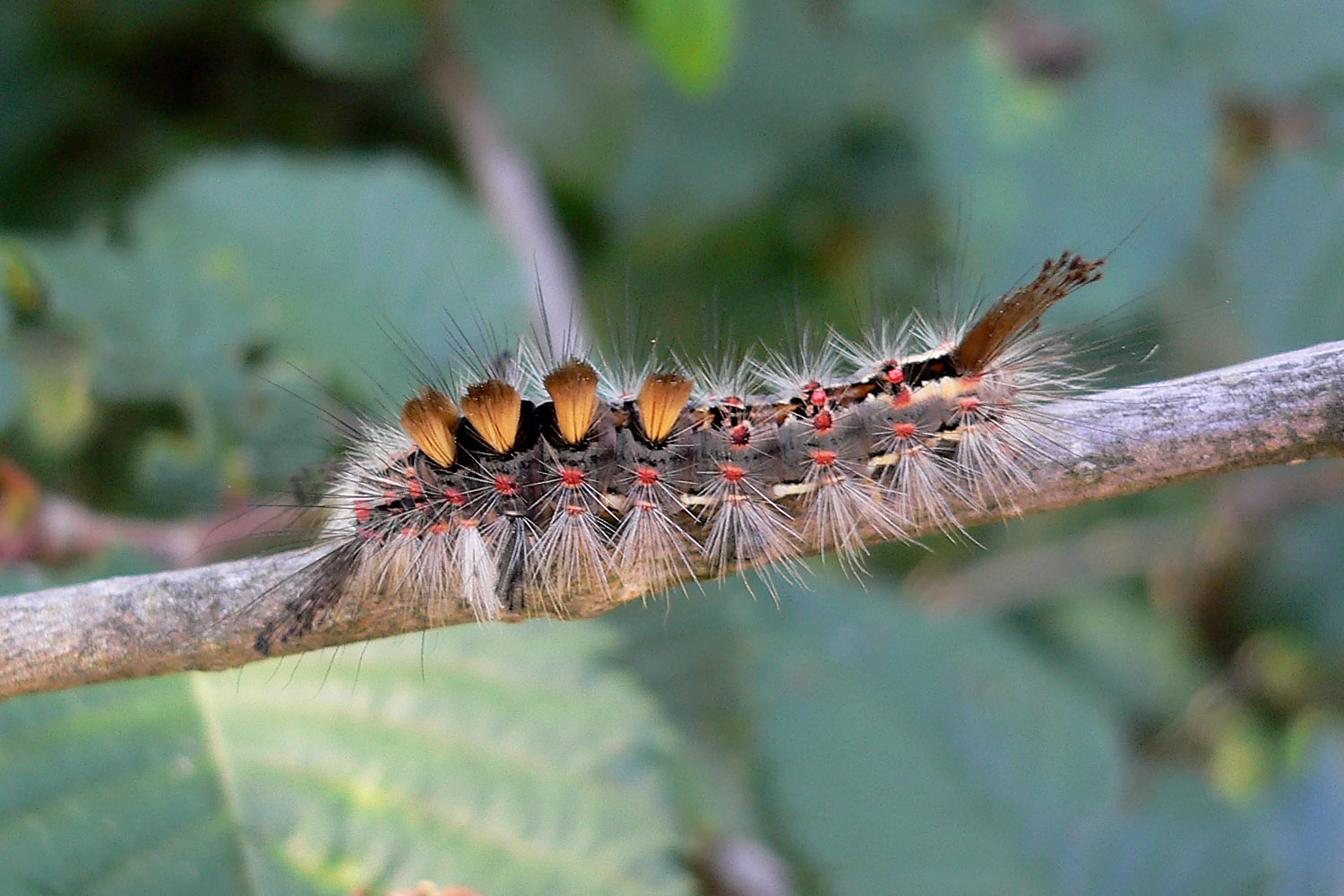
- male imago and caterpillar

Conservation status
- Secure (NatureServe)

Scientific classification
- Kingdom: Animalia
- Phylum: Arthropoda
- Clade: Pancrustacea
- Class: Insecta
- Order: Lepidoptera
- Superfamily: Noctuoidea
- Family: Erebidae
- Genus: Orgyia
- Species: O. antiqua

Binomial name
- Orgyia antiqua (Linnaeus, 1758)

Synonyms
- Notolophus antiqua Linnaeus; Orgyia confinis (Grum-Grshimailo, 1891); Orgyia gonostigma (Scopoli, 1763); Orgyia recens (Hübner, 1819); Phalaena antiqua Linnaeus, 1758; Phalaena paradoxa (Retzius, 1783)

= Orgyia antiqua =

Rusty tussock moth

Species of moth

Orgyia antiqua, the rusty tussock moth or vapourer, is a moth in the family Erebidae.

== Distribution and status ==
O. antiqua is native to Europe, but now has a transcontinental distribution in the Palaearctic and the Nearctic regions. The species is not on the IUCN (2007) Red List; and in the UK is considered a common resident.

== Habitat ==
In the UK, O. antiqua may be encountered in a variety of shrub-based habitats, including gardens, parks, open woodland, fens, hedgerows, heaths, and moors.

== Description ==
A striking dimorphism exists between the male and the female moths of this species. The male moth typically has orange- to red-brown (ochreous red and dark brown) wings; each fore wing has a white comma-shaped (tornal) spot. It has marked plumose (short, bipectinate) antennae. The wingspan measures between 35 and 38 mm. The female moth has vestigial wings and is flightless; it is light grey-brown (ochreous grey), has "shortly bipectinate" antennae, and a swollen abdomen. The compound eyes of the two sexes differ not only with regard to their size, number of facets and internal organization and ultrastructure, but also with regard to their sensitivity to ultraviolet radiation The hairy caterpillar is spectacular, with "humps", "horns", and a "tail" in a combination of dark grey, red, and yellow.

== Lifecycle ==
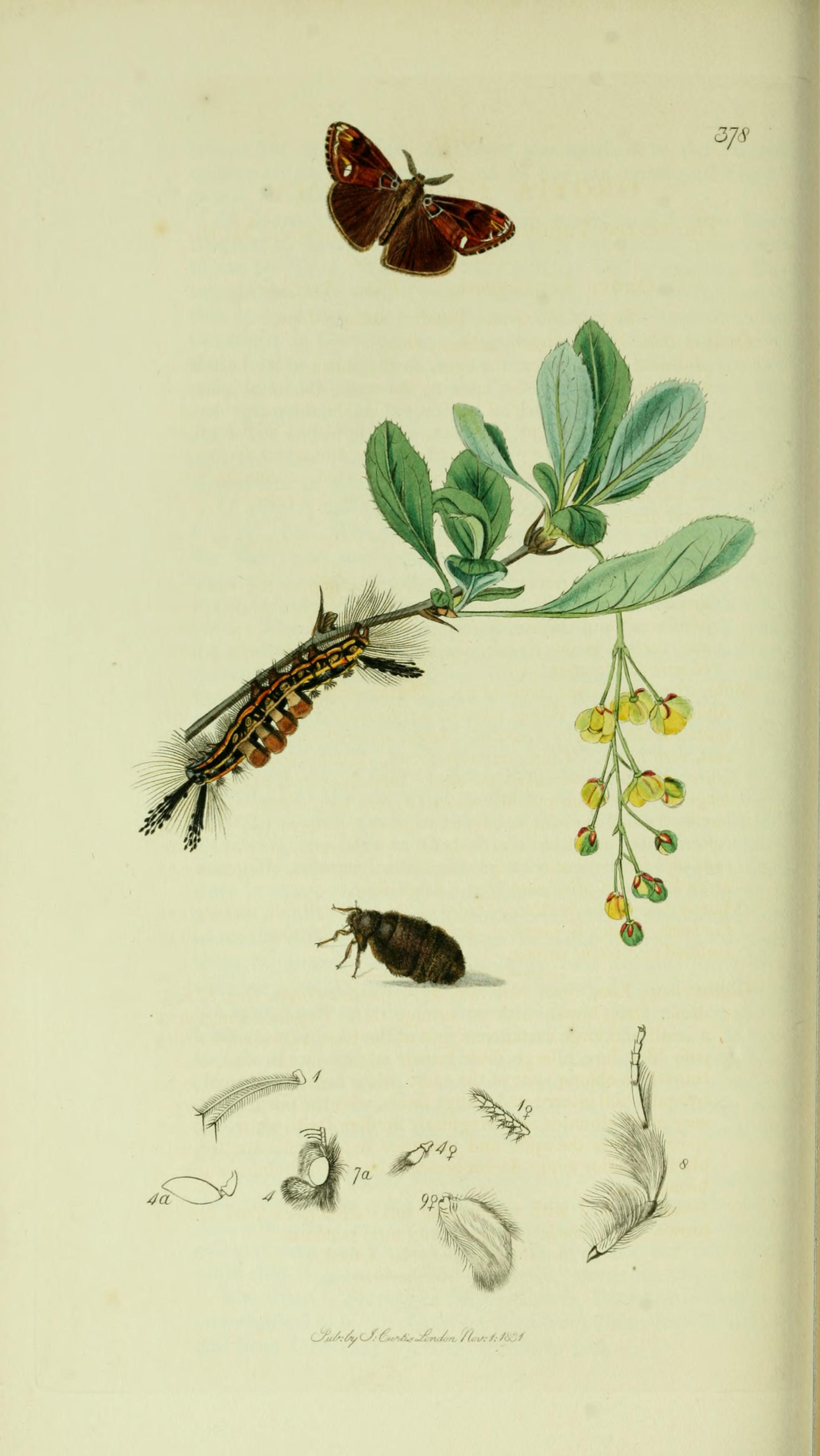
Illustration from John Curtis's British Entomology

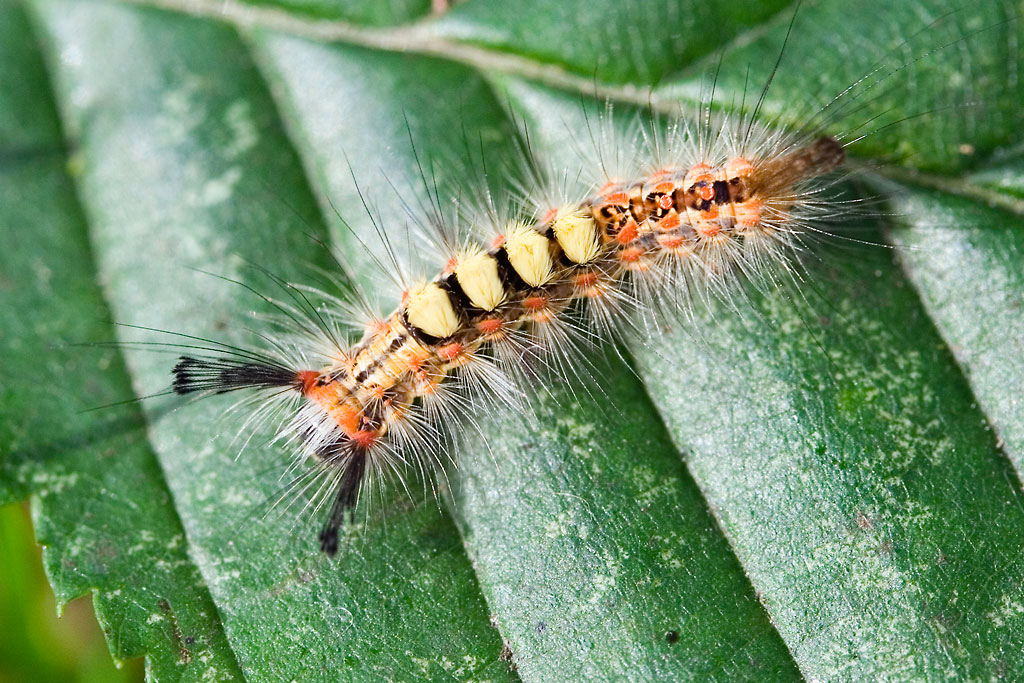
Late instar caterpillar showing the four clumps of dorsal tussock hairs

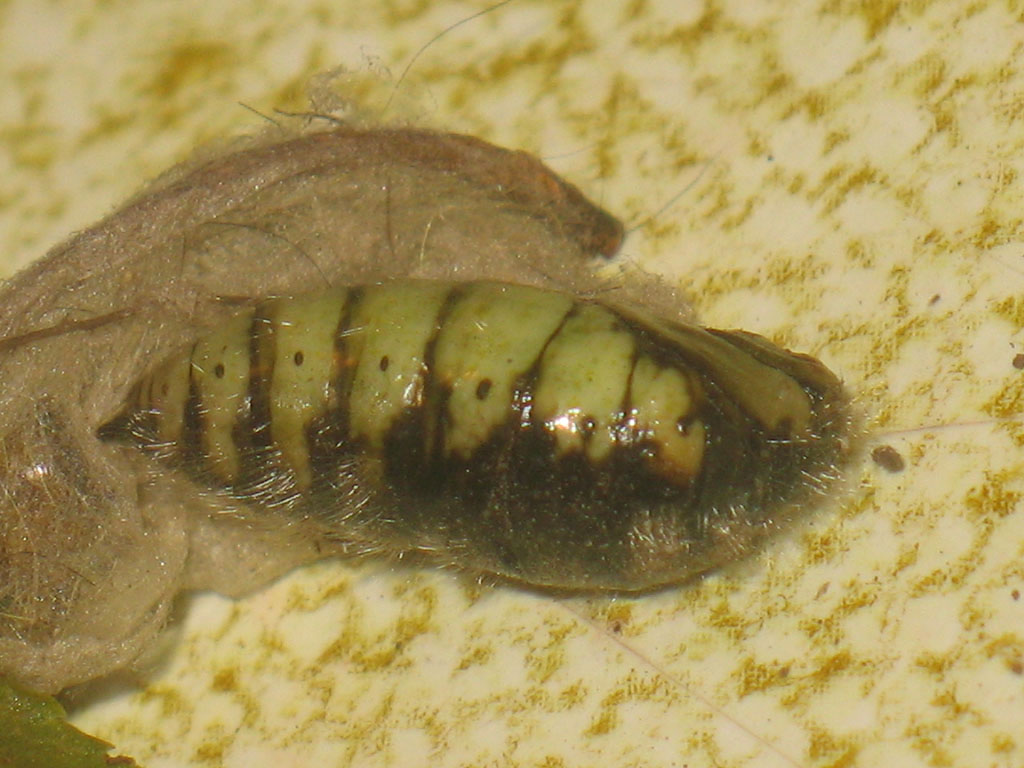
The pupa

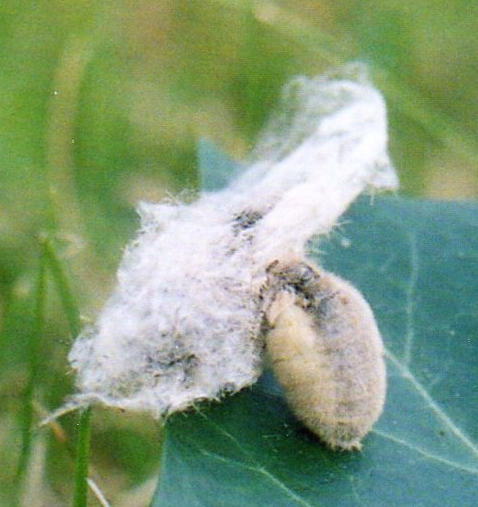
The flightless female clings to her cocoon during her brief adult life

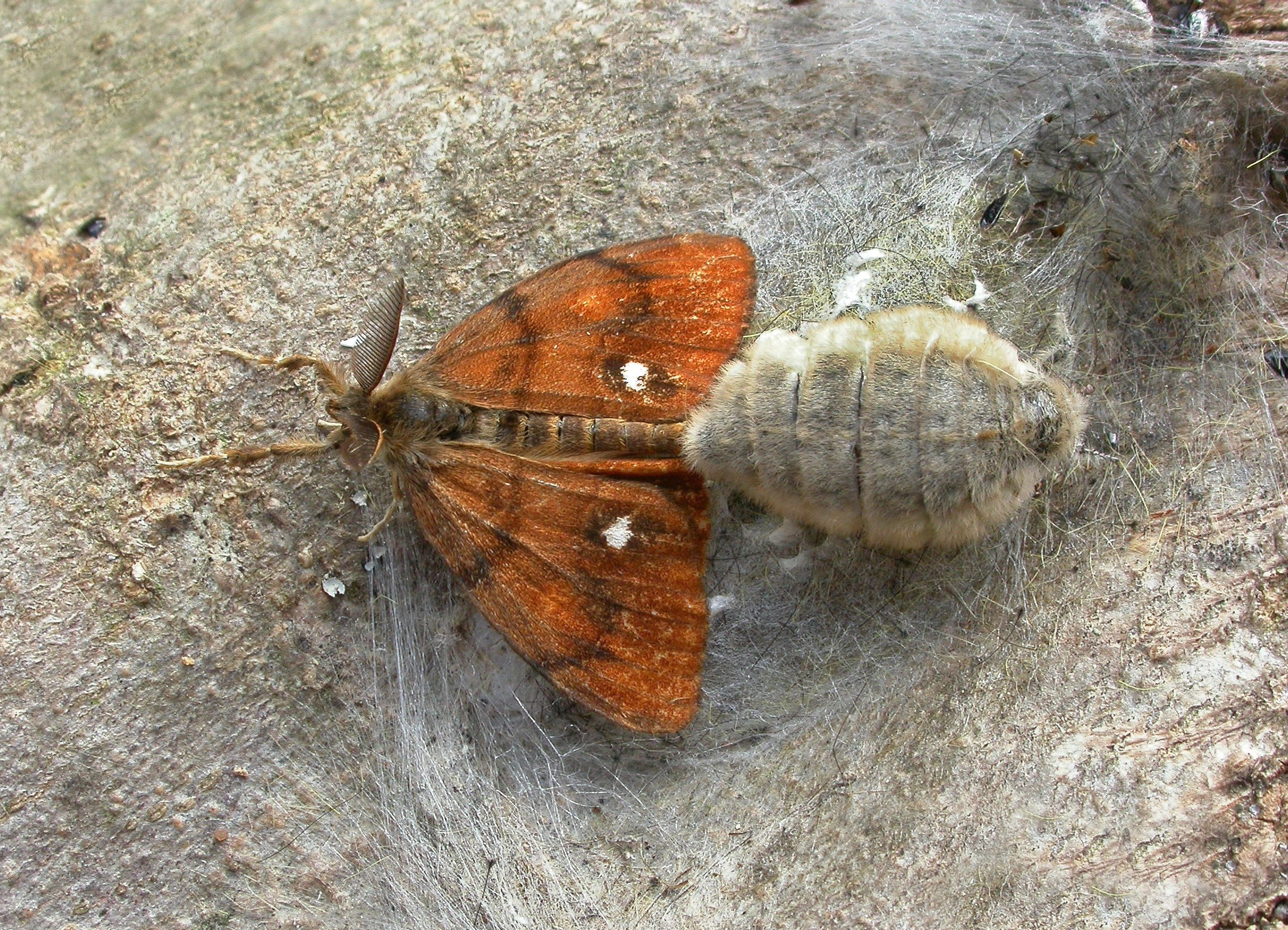
Mating pair (male at left), illustrating their stark sexual dimorphism

=== Egg ===
Several hundred eggs are laid on the outside of the female's empty cocoon, usually attached to a host plant or something close by (e.g. fence, wall). The species overwinters in the egg stage. Each brownish egg is rounded, somewhat flattened top and bottom. A small darker depression is seen in the upperside.

=== Caterpillar ===
The larvae hatch early in the spring, as soon as foliage starts to appear. They are easily recognized by their horn-like tufts of hair-like setae. Four toothbrush-like tufts occur along the back, and hair pencils project from the sides at the front and at the back. The body is dark grey to black, and red tubercules are along the sides and back.

They have defensive glands at the back, and wipe their setae against them to charge them with toxins. They grow to about 30–40 mm, females being considerably larger than males. In the UK, caterpillars can be found between May and early September.

The caterpillar is a minor forest pest in North America, and may become a pest in cities in the UK.

=== Pupa ===
The pupa forms in a crevice (e.g. in tree bark or fence) inside a silk cocoon. It is glossy black and hairy.

=== Imagines ===
The male flies in a zigzag pattern—often high up in search of females—and is active during the day or at night. Males occasionally come to light. In New Brunswick, adult males are attracted to pheromone traps set in commercial forests for white-marked tussock moth (O. leucostigma).

The female is flightless, spending her brief life attached to her cocoon. The female attracts other males via release of a pheromone, the males find the female via the concentration gradient of the released pheromone. The female mates and lays her grey-yellow eggs in large numbers on her fine-meshed cocoon.

The adult moths do not feed, so they only live for a short time. The two (sometimes three) generations fly from May till October; in North America, only one generation occurs in a year. In the UK, one protracted generation, from July to October in the south, and from September to October in the north, is believed to happen.

The males are diurnal, flying during the day, but are occasionally attracted to light.

== Host plants ==
Caterpillars are polyphagous and feed on a wide range of deciduous trees and shrubs, such as birch (Betula), Crataegus, lime (Tilia), Prunus, Quercus, Rubus, Salix, Tamarix, Vaccinium, Aeonium haworthii or Delonix regia.

In Scotland, the species is almost always found on birch, but has also been recorded damaging Sitka spruce.

== Gallery ==
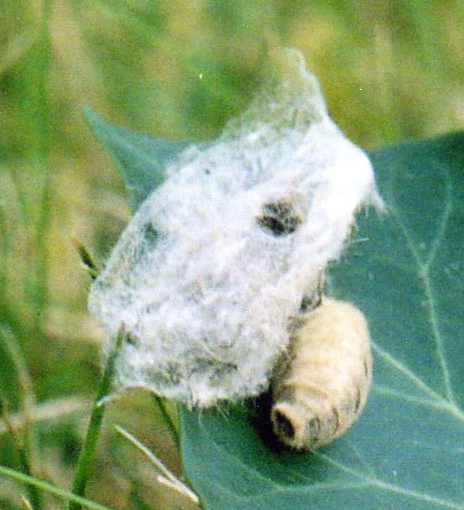
rear view of "calling" female

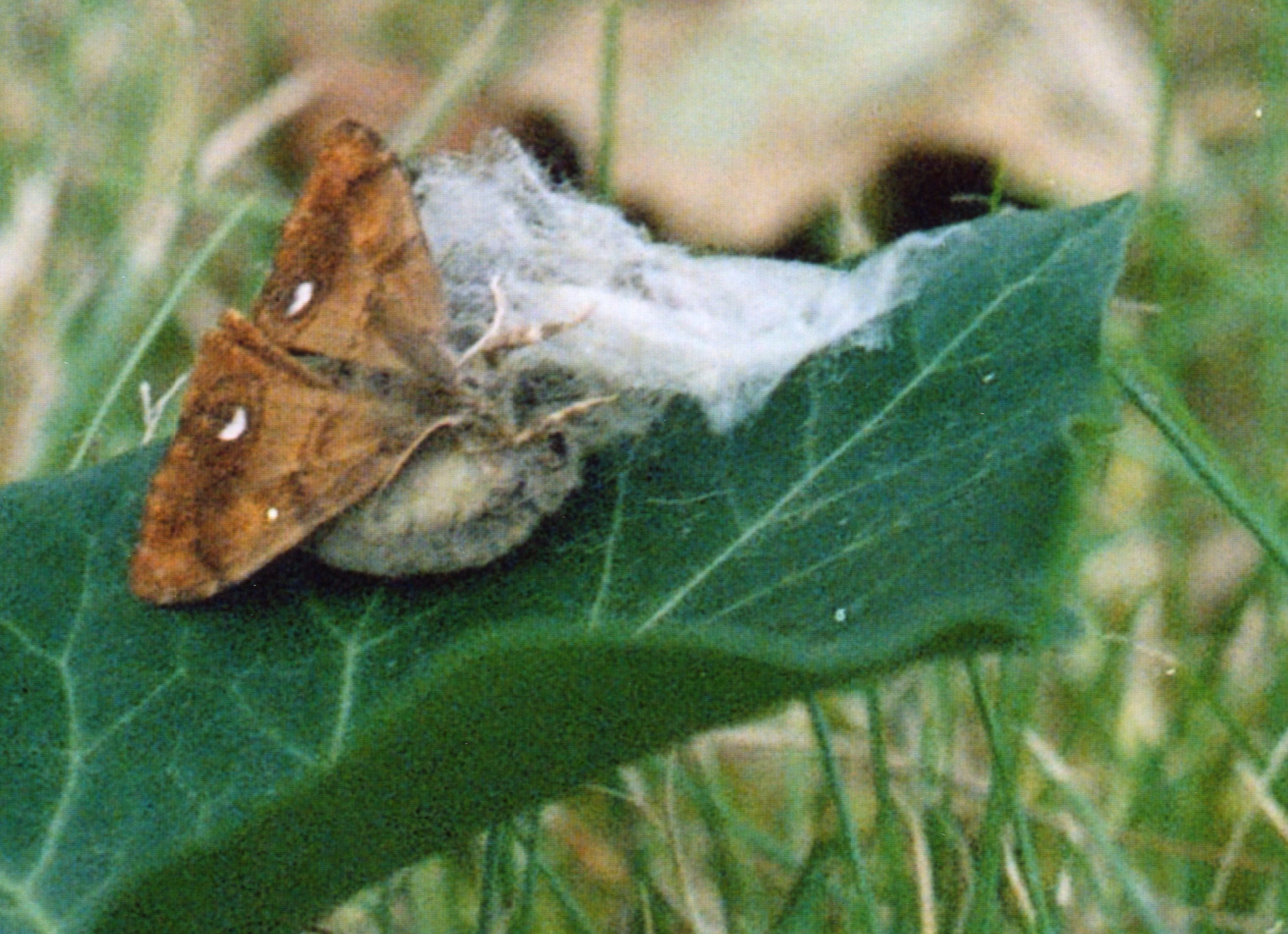
mating

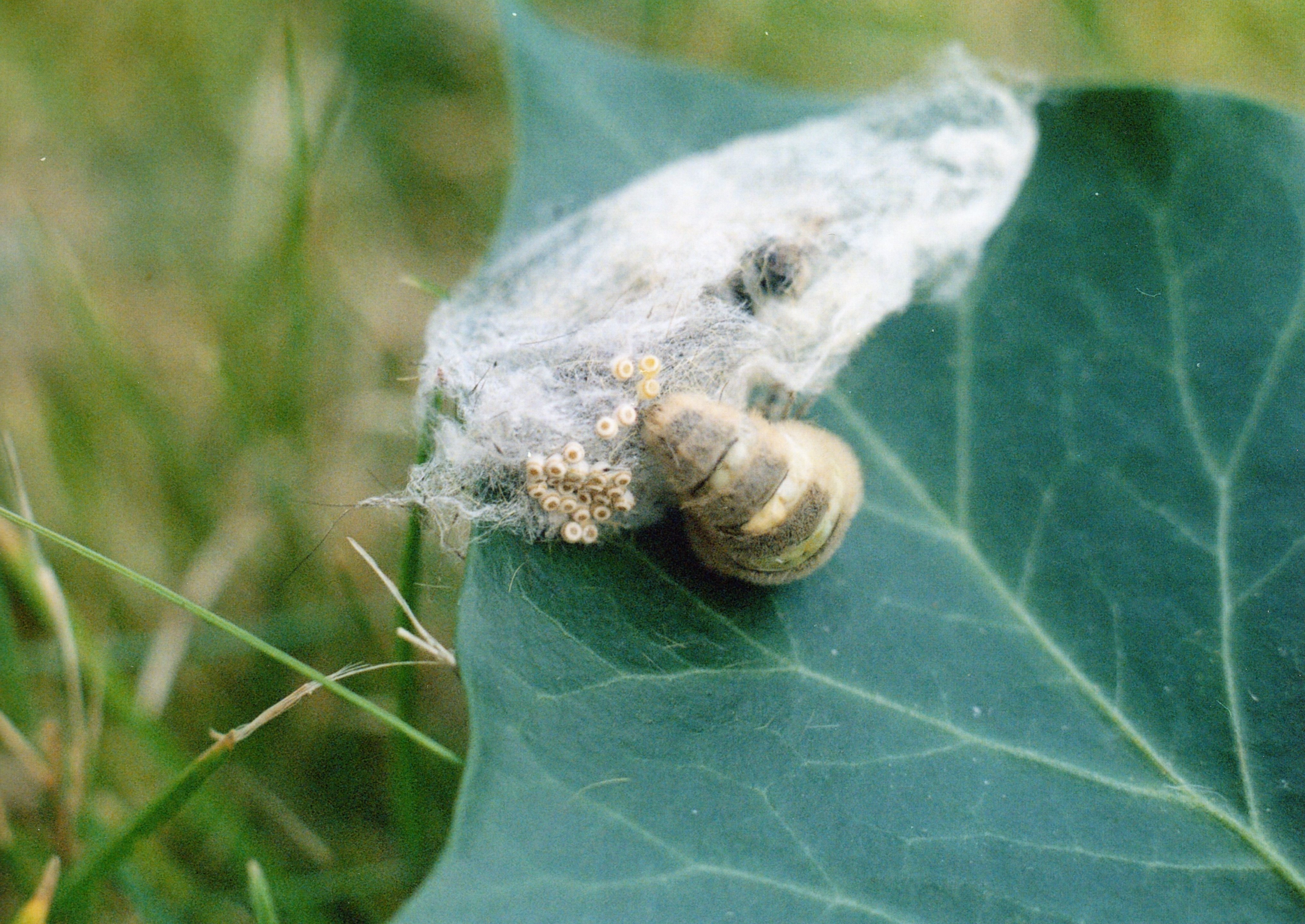
female laying her eggs on the remains of her own cocoon

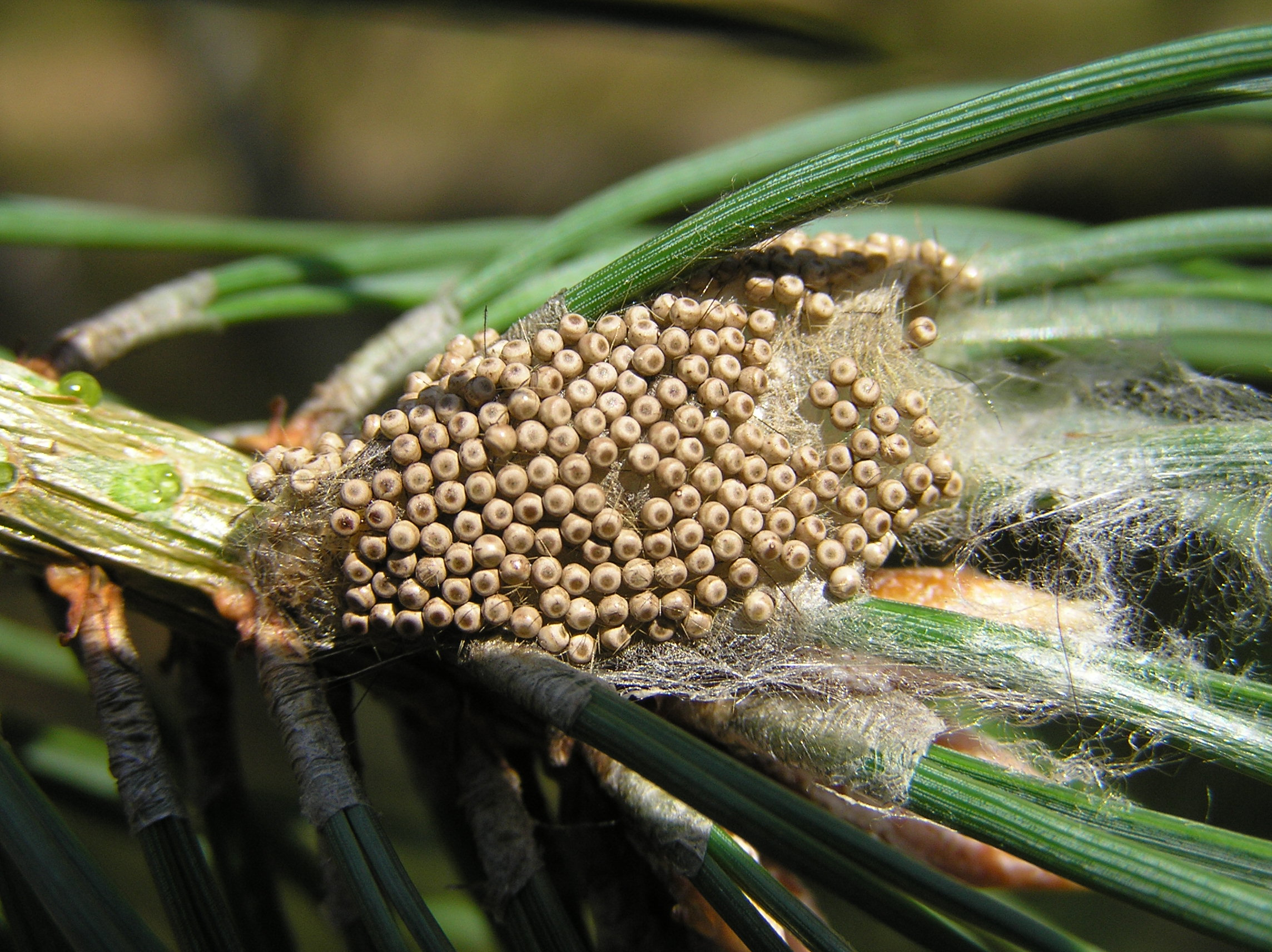
egg-mass on an empty cocoon amongst conifer needles

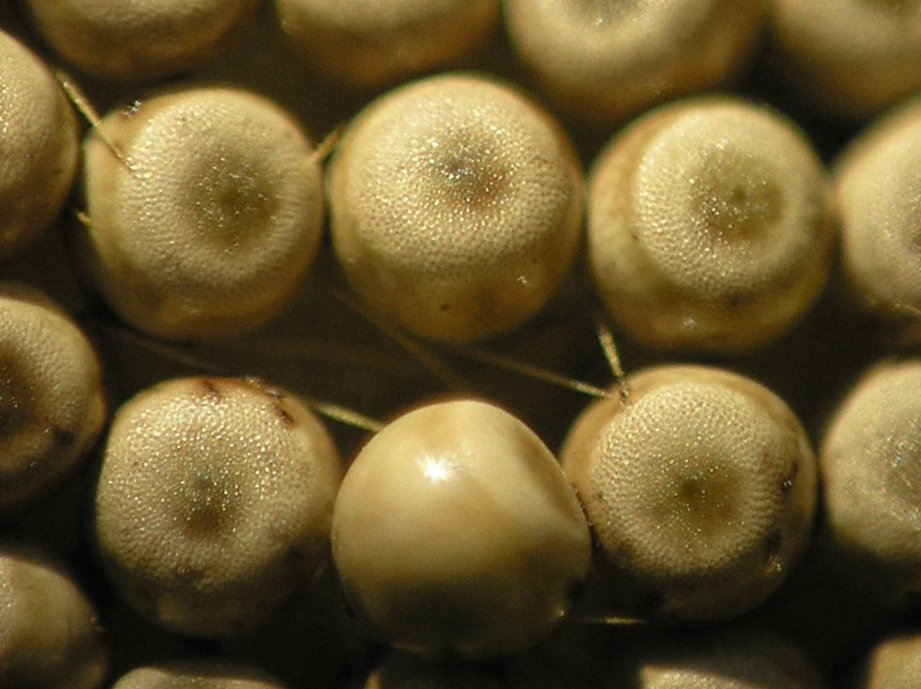
eggs (close up)

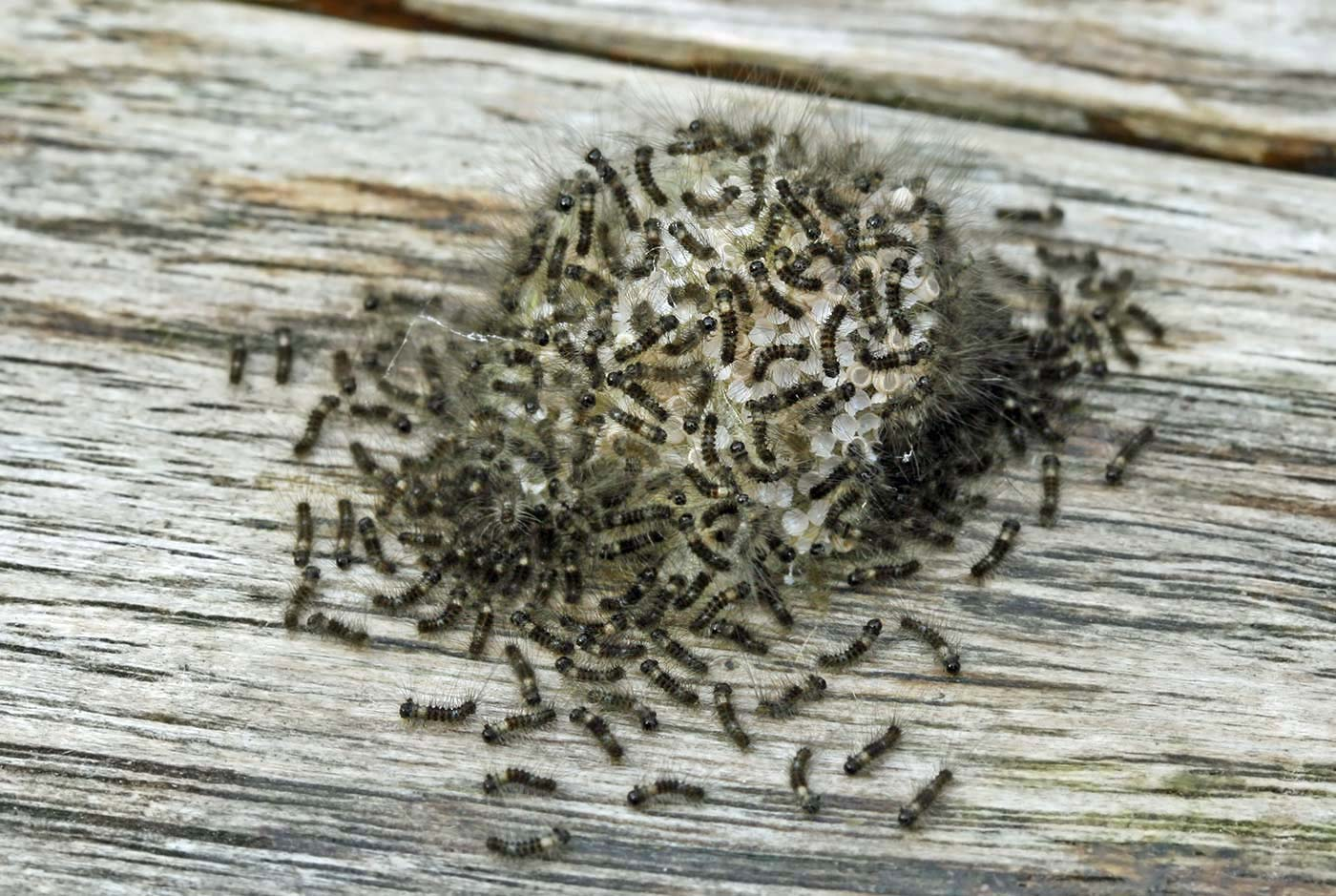
young larvae

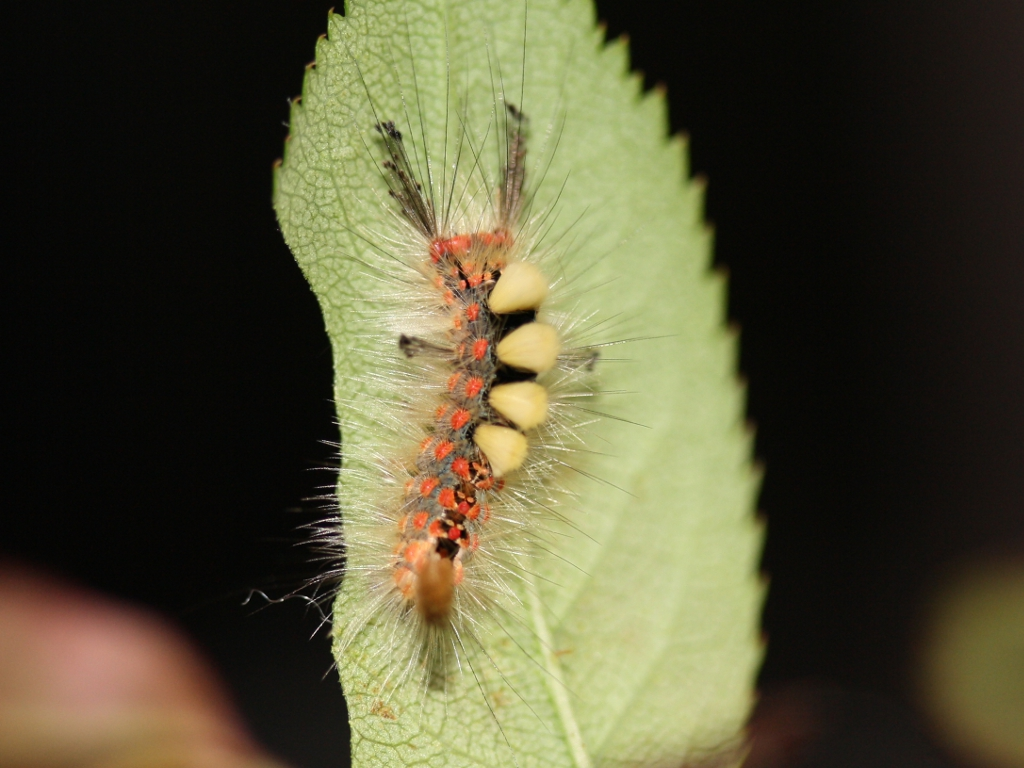
late instar larva on rose leaf

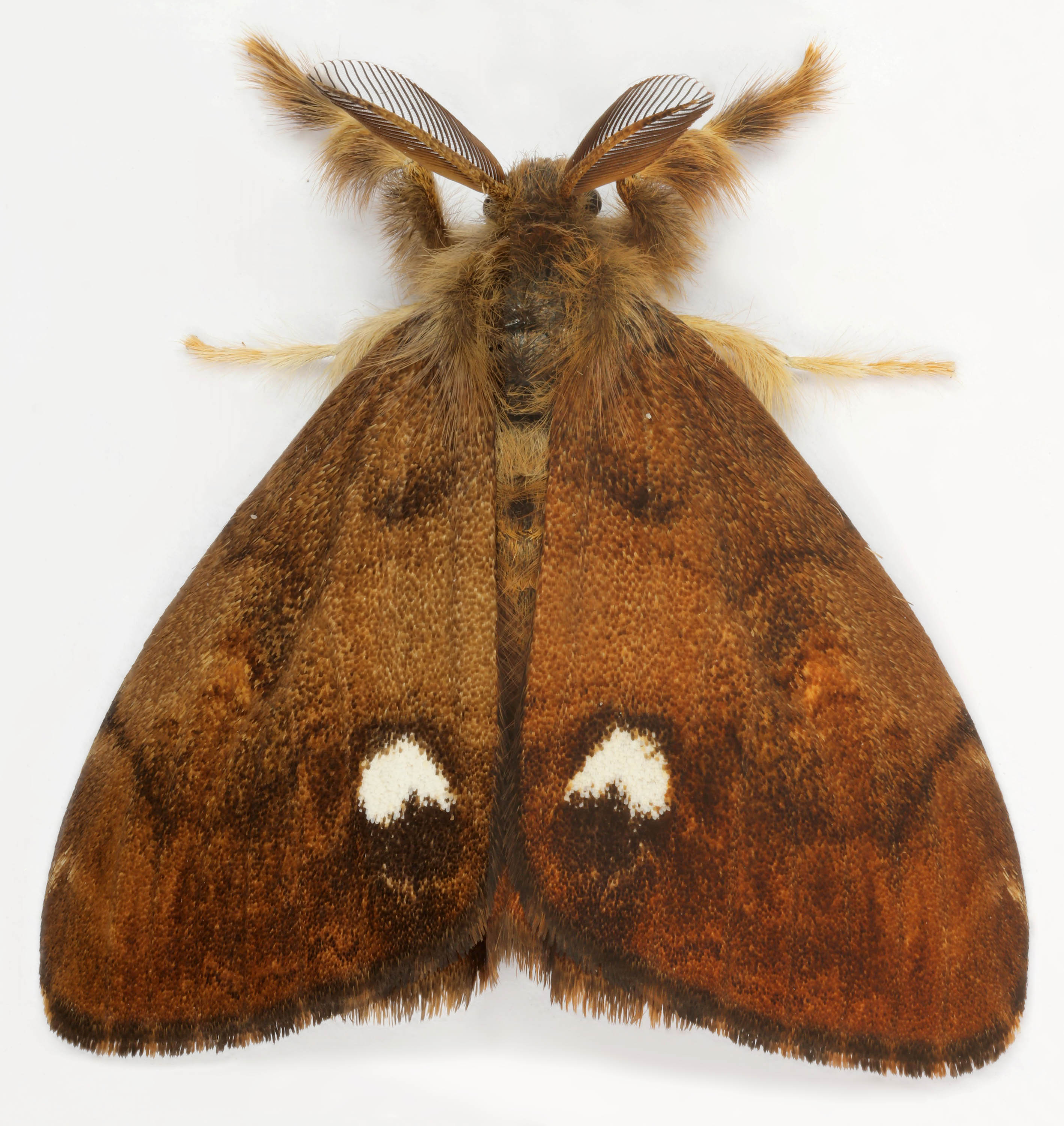
volant male imago

== Illustrations ==
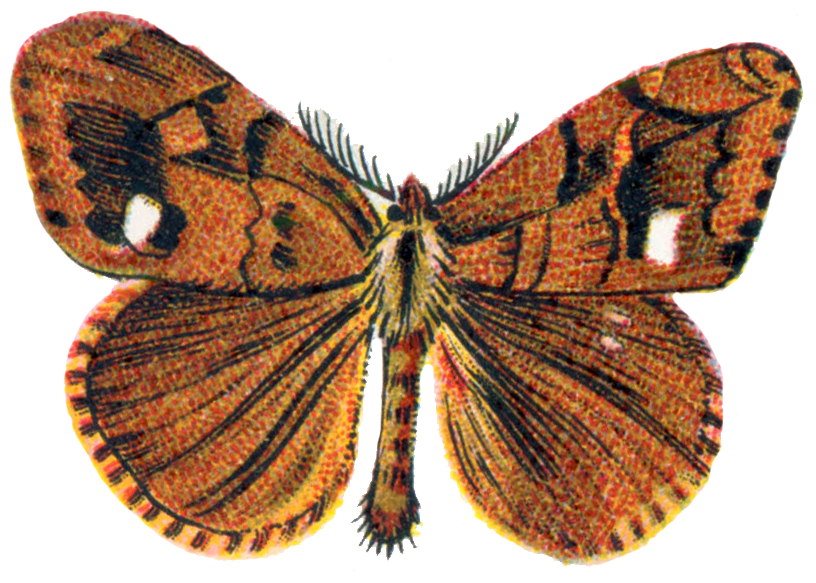
Illustrated adult male

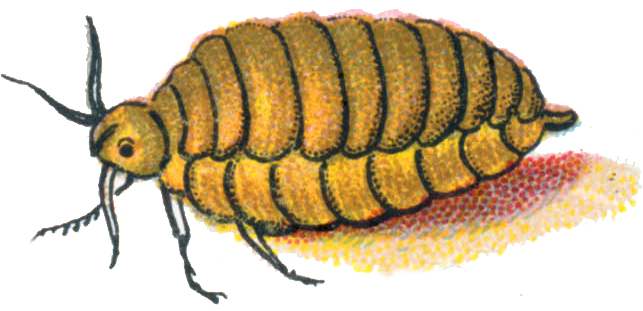
Illustrated adult female

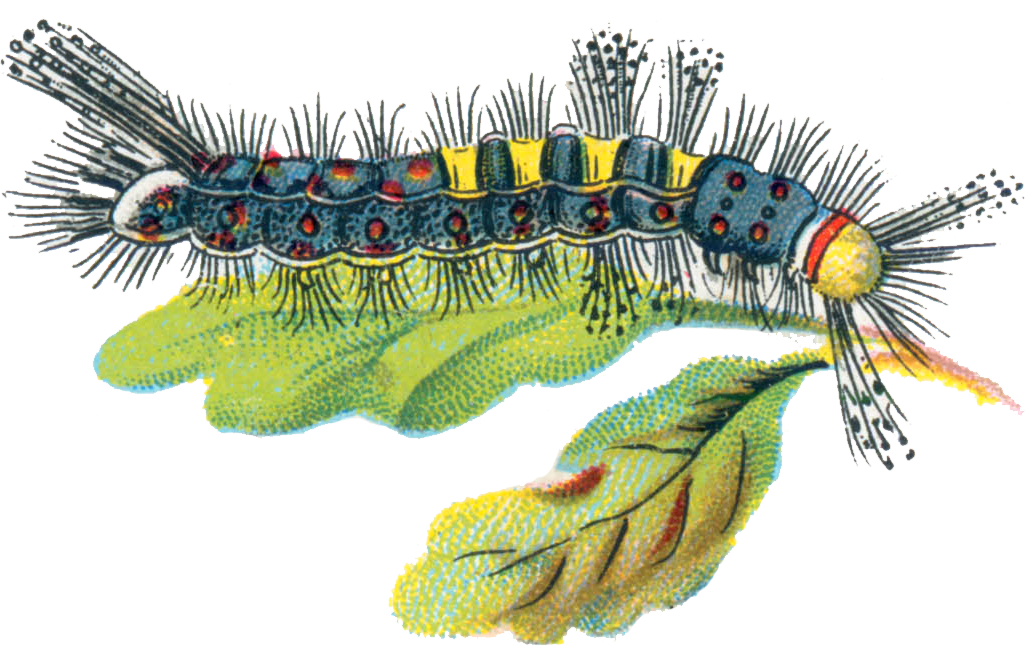
Illustrated caterpillar
