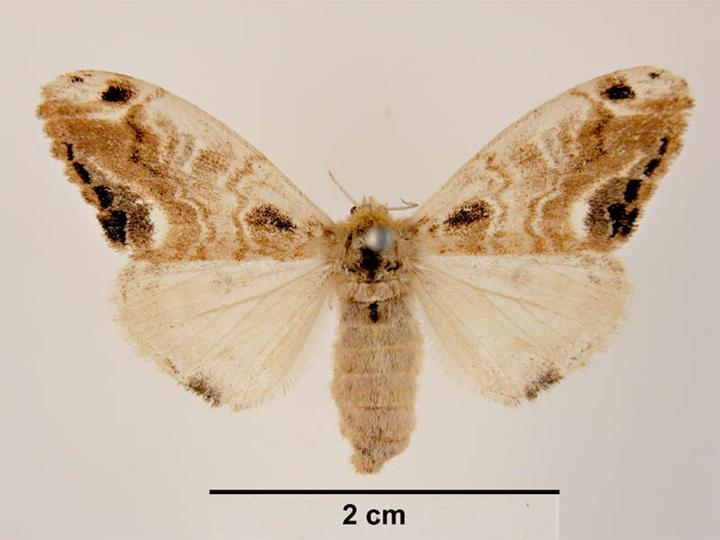
- Female, dorsal view
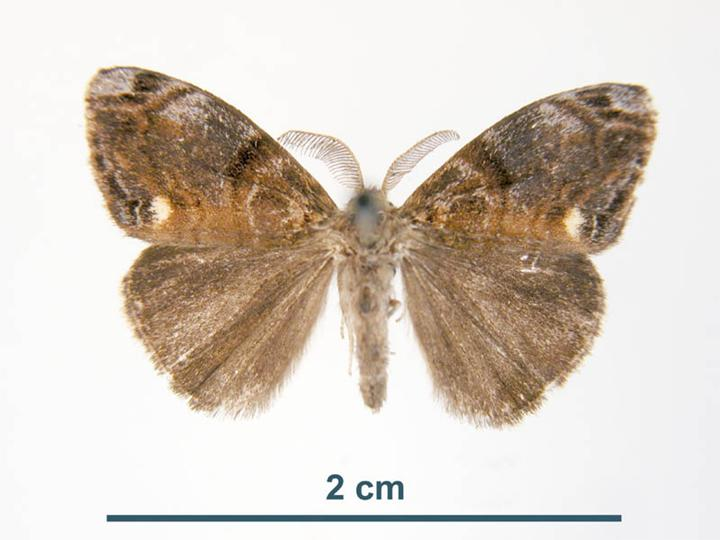
- Male, dorsal view

Scientific classification
- Kingdom: Animalia
- Phylum: Arthropoda
- Clade: Pancrustacea
- Class: Insecta
- Order: Lepidoptera
- Superfamily: Noctuoidea
- Family: Erebidae
- Genus: Orgyia
- Species: O. thyellina

Binomial name
- Orgyia thyellina Butler, 1881

= Orgyia thyellina =

White-spotted tussock moth

Species of moth

Orgyia thyellina, the white-spotted tussock moth, is a species of moth of the subfamily Lymantriinae first described by Arthur Gardiner Butler in 1881..

The wingspan is 21–29 mm for males and 30–42 mm for females of the first two generations.

The larvae mainly feed on Rosaceae species, including mulberry (Morus), Pyrus, Prunus avium, Prunus domestica and Malus. Other recorded food plants include Rosa, Prunus persica, Salix, Betula, Quercus, Acer negundo, Wisteria, Kennedia, Clianthus puniceus, and Citrus × paradisi.

== Gallery ==
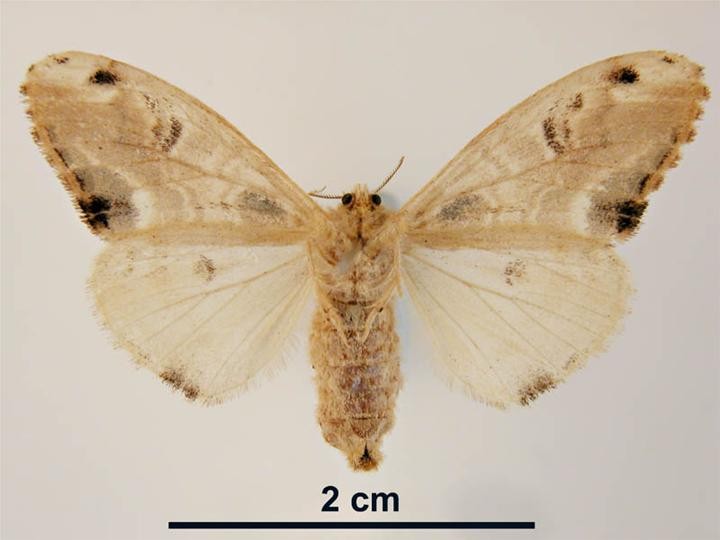
Female, ventral view

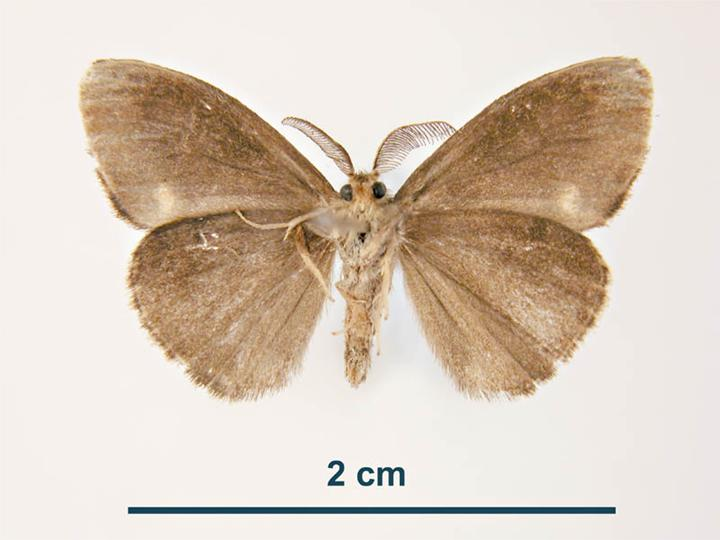
Male, ventral view
