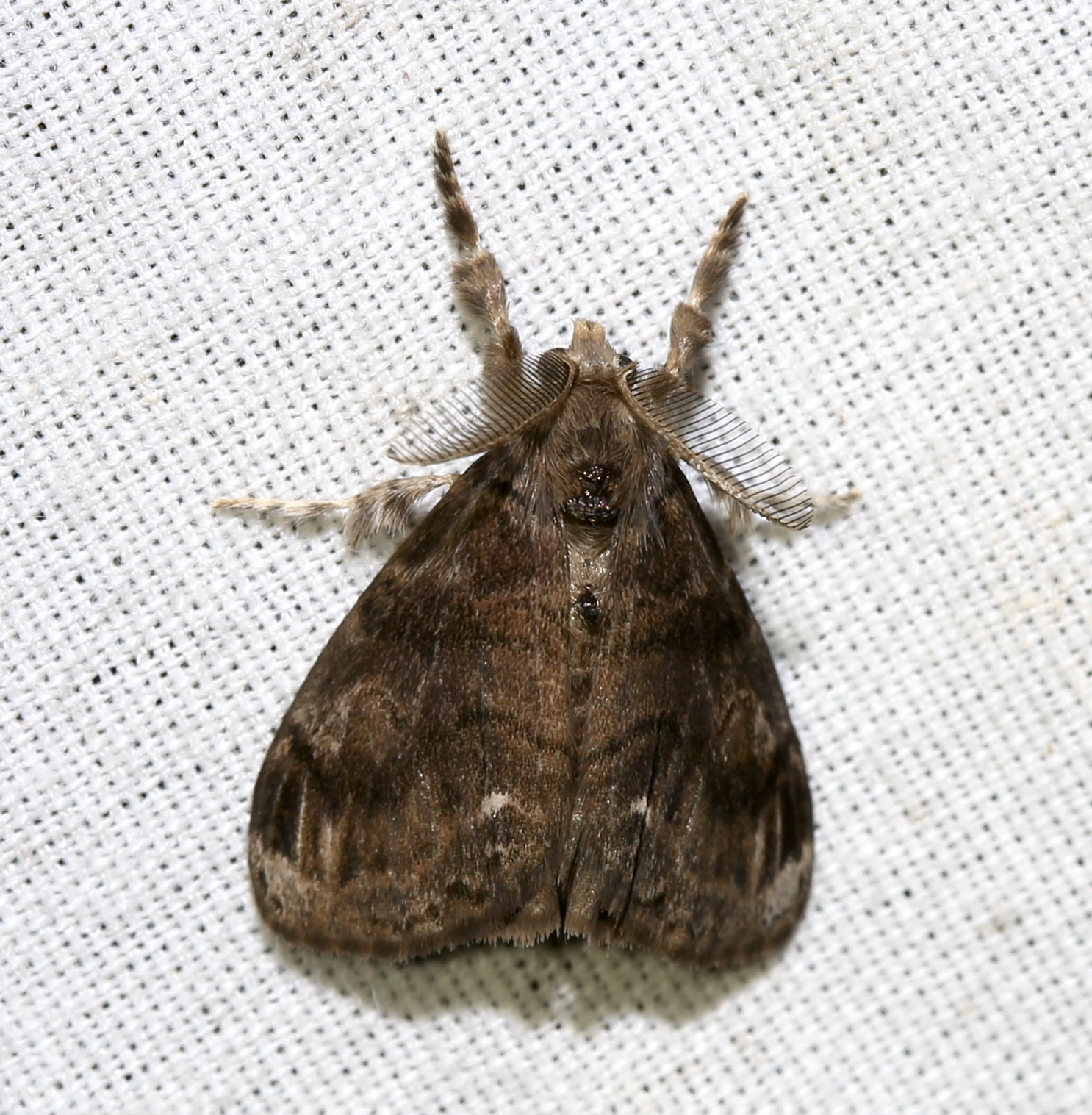
- Adult
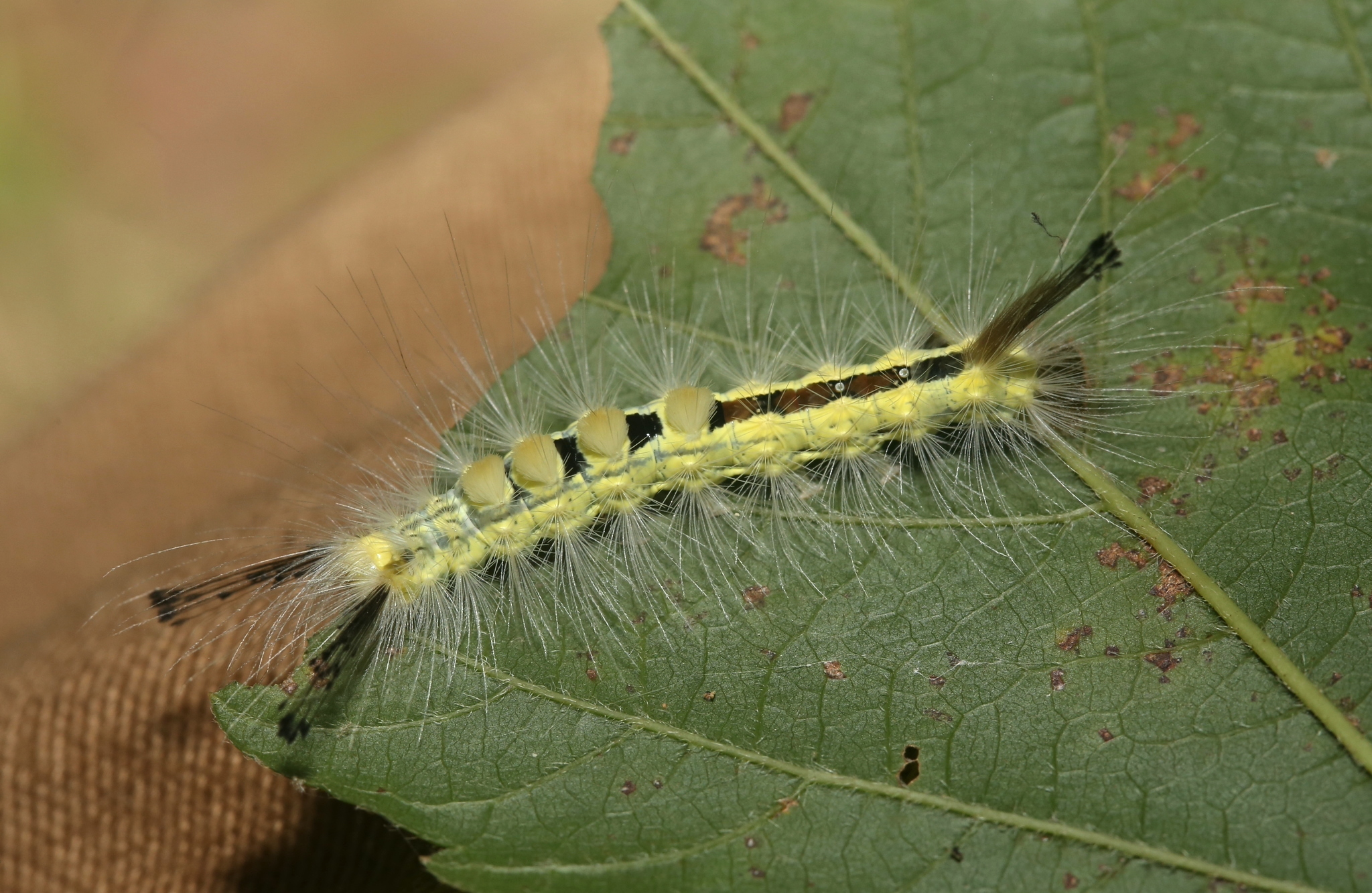
- Larva on Acer negundo

Scientific classification
- Kingdom: Animalia
- Phylum: Arthropoda
- Clade: Pancrustacea
- Class: Insecta
- Order: Lepidoptera
- Superfamily: Noctuoidea
- Family: Erebidae
- Genus: Orgyia
- Species: O. definita

Binomial name
- Orgyia definita Packard, [1865]

= Orgyia definita =

Species of moth

Orgyia definita, the definite tussock moth or definite-marked tussock moth, is a moth of the family Erebidae. It was first described by Alpheus Spring Packard in 1865. The species is found in eastern North America from Minnesota to New Brunswick and south to South Carolina, Mississippi, and Louisiana.

The wingspan is about 30 mm for males; females are wingless.

The larvae feed on Salix, Quercus, Tilia, Ulmus, Betula, Acer rubrum, and Hamamelis virginiana.

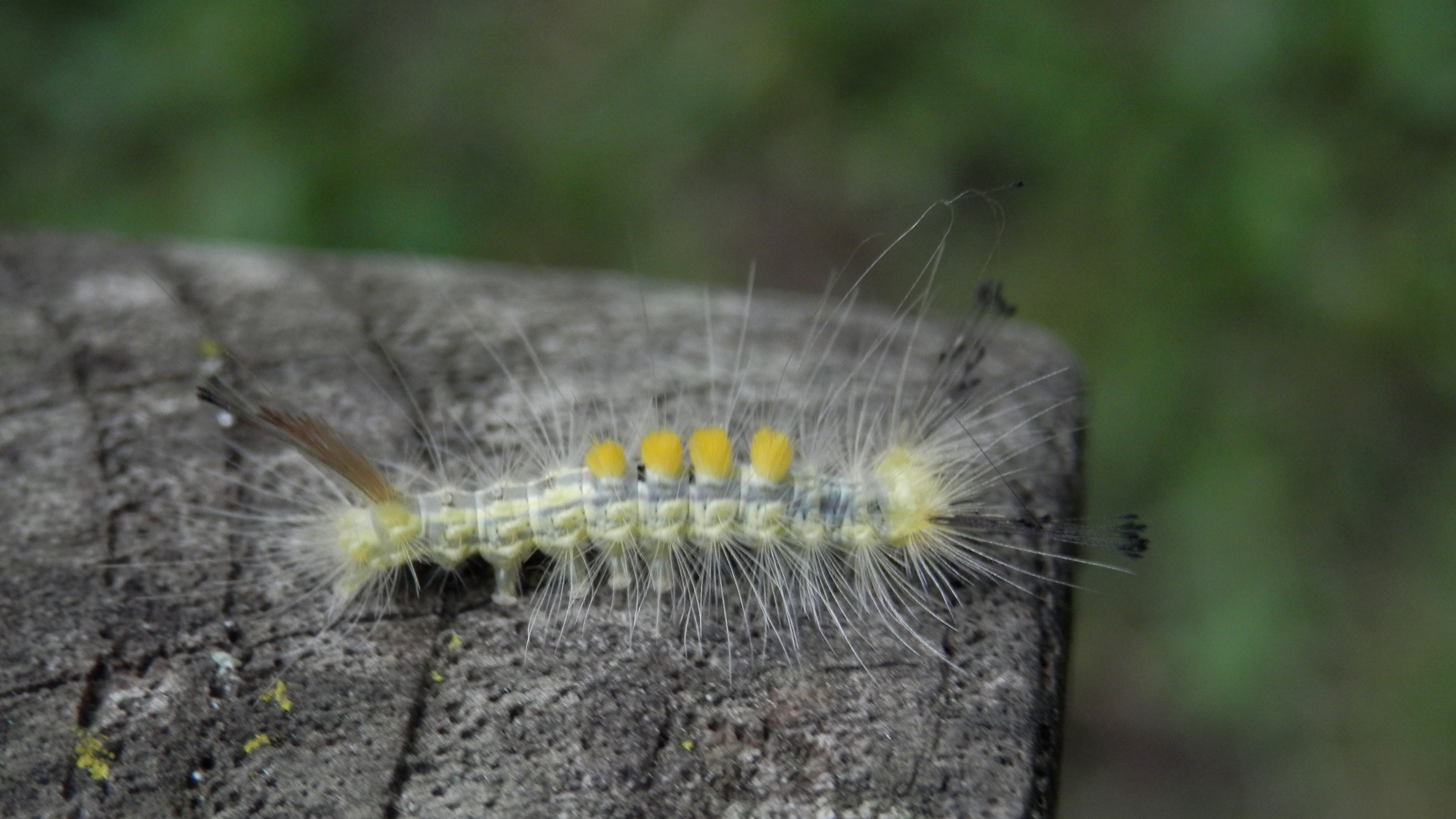
Larva in Guelph, Ontario, Canada
