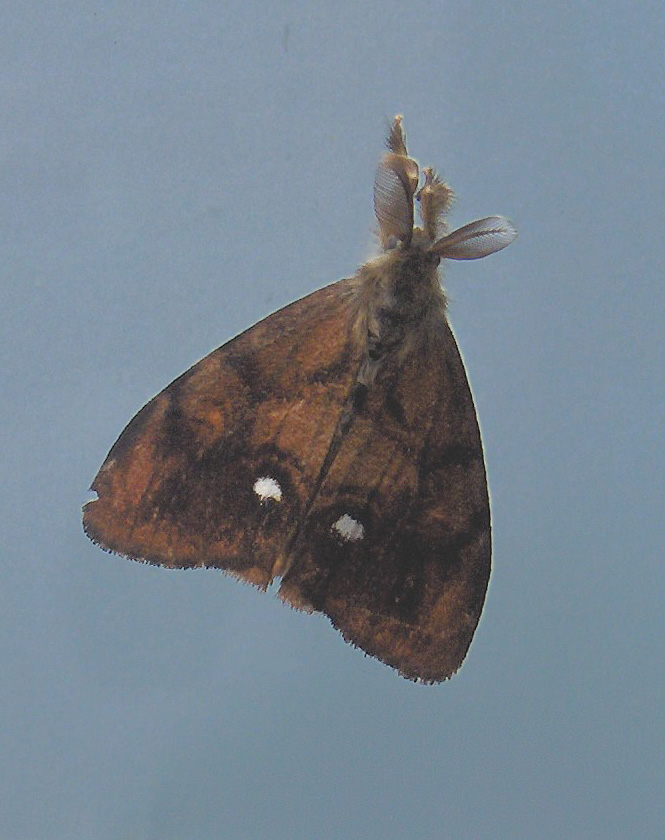
- Orgyia antiqua

Scientific classification
- Domain: Eukaryota
- Kingdom: Animalia
- Phylum: Arthropoda
- Class: Insecta
- Order: Lepidoptera
- Superfamily: Noctuoidea
- Family: Erebidae
- Subfamily: Lymantriinae
- Tribe: Orgyiini
- Genus: Orgyia; Ochsenheimer, 1810

Synonyms
- Notolophus Germar, 1812; Orgya Zetterstedt, 1839; Trichosoma Rambur, 1832; Micropterogyna Rambur, 1866; Apterogynis Guenée, 1875; Hemerocampa Dyar, 1897

= Orgyia =

Genus of moths

Orgyia is a genus of tussock moths of the family Erebidae. The genus was described by Ochsenheimer in 1810. The species are cosmopolitan, except for the Neotropical realm.

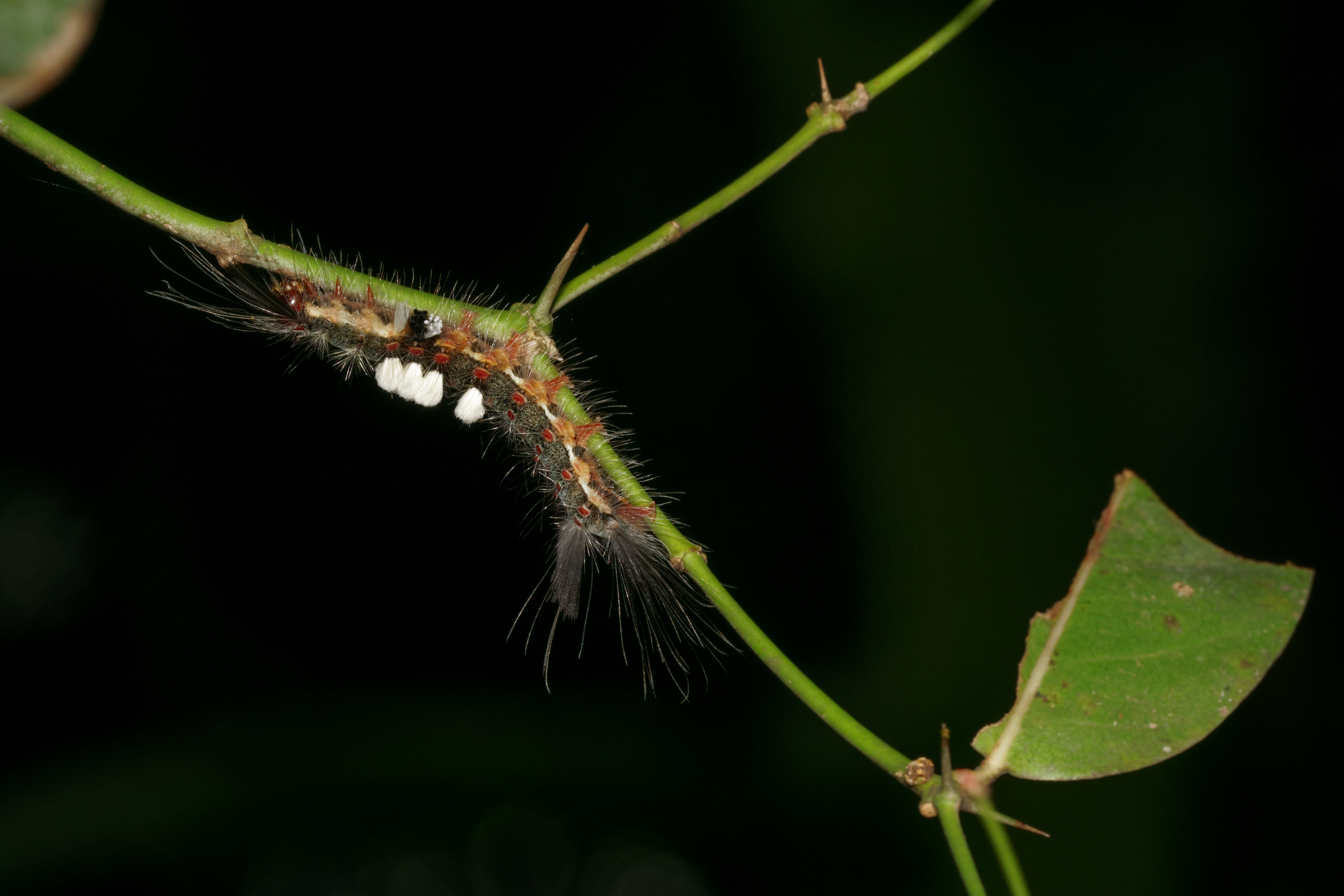
Orgyia sp.

== Description ==
The male flies during the day. Its palpi are short, porrect (extending forward), and heavily fringed with hair. The antennae have long branches and long spines at the extremities. The legs are heavily hairy. The abdomen has a dorsal tuft on its second segment. The forewing has vein 9 arising from vein 10 and anastomosing with vein 8 to form an areole. The hindwing has veins 3 and 4 from angle of cell, vein 5 from just above angle, and vein 6 and 7 stalked.

In the female, the palpi and legs are less hairy. The antennae are serrate. The wings are aborted, scale-like and covered with hair. The abdomen is covered with hair and immensely dilated when full of eggs.

== Species ==
- Orgyia albofasciata (Schintlmeister, 1994)
- Orgyia amphideta (Turner, 1902)
- Orgyia antiqua (Linnaeus, 1758) – rusty tussock moth, vapourer moth
- Orgyia araea (Collenette, 1932)
- Orgyia ariadne (Schintlmeister, 1994)
- Orgyia australis Walker, 1855
- Orgyia basinigra (Heylaerts, 1892)
- Orgyia cana H. Edwards, 1881
- Orgyia chionitis (Turner, 1902)
- Orgyia definita Packard, [1865] – definite tussock moth
- Orgyia detrita Guérin-Méneville, [1832] – fir tussock moth
- Orgyia dewara Swinhoe, 1903
- Orgyia falcata Schaus, 1896
- Orgyia fulviceps (Walker, 1855)
- Orgyia leptotypa (Turner, 1904)
- Orgyia leucostigma (Smith, 1797) – white-marked tussock moth
- Orgyia leuschneri Riotte, 1972
- Orgyia magna Ferguson, 1978
- Orgyia osseana Walker, 1862
- Orgyia papuana Riotte, 1976
- Orgyia pelodes (Lower, 1893)
- Orgyia postica (Walker, 1855)
- Orgyia pseudotsugata (McDunnough, 1921) – Douglas-fir tussock moth
- Orgyia semiochrea (Herrich-Schäffer, [1855])
- Orgyia thyellina Butler, 1881
- Orgyia vetusta Boisduval, 1852 – western tussock moth
- Orgyia viridescens (Walker, 1855)
