= A. flavipes =

A. flavipes may refer to:

- Abacetus flavipes, a ground beetle
- Ablautus flavipes, a robber fly
- Agriocoris flavipes, an assassin bug found in Central and South America
- Agyneta flavipes, a sheet weaver found in Japan
- Amanita flavipes, a fungus found in Asia
- Amniscus flavipes, a synonym of Polyacanthia flavipes, a longhorn beetle found in New Zealand
- Amphionycha flavipes, a synonym of Adesmus clathratus, a longhorn beetle found in Brazil
- Antechinus flavipes, the yellow-footed antechinus, a marsupial found in Australia
- Anthrenus flavipes, the furniture carpet beetle
- Argyra flavipes, a long-legged fly
- Argyroeides flavipes, a moth found in Brazil
- Aspergillus flavipes, a fungus
- Autochloris flavipes, a moth found in Colombia
