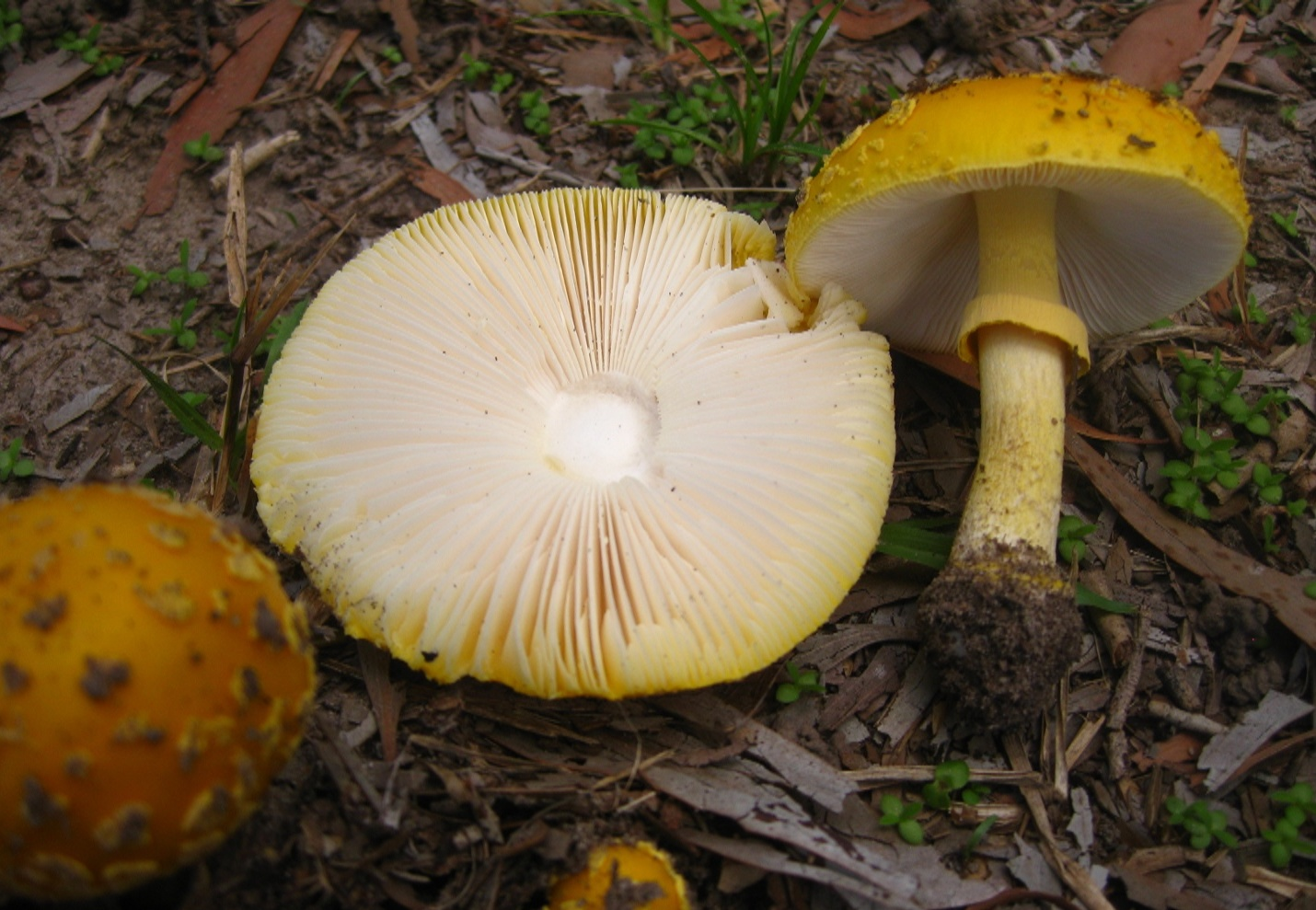

Scientific classification
- Domain: Eukaryota
- Kingdom: Fungi
- Division: Basidiomycota
- Class: Agaricomycetes
- Order: Agaricales
- Family: Amanitaceae
- Genus: Amanita
- Species: A. flavella

Binomial name
- Amanita flavella E.-J.Gilbert & Cleland (1941)

= Amanita flavella =

Species of fungus

Amanita flavella Mycological characteristics
- Gills on hymenium
- Cap is convex or flat
- Hymenium is free
- Stipe has a ring and volva
- Spore print is white
- Ecology is mycorrhizal
- Edibility is unknown

Amanita flavella is a species of mycorrhizal fungus from family Amanitaceae. It has a convex lemon-yellow coloured cap up to 9 centimetres (3 1/2 inches) in diameter. They can also be yellowish-orange coloured and have crowded pale-yellow gills. The yellowish-white stipe is central and 9 cm tall; it is slightly bulbous, and enclosed into a volva. The yellowish-white ring is flared, ample, and membranous. The spores are 8.5–10 μm long and 6–6.5 μm wide, white, amyloid, and ellipsoid. The species is similar in appearance to A. flavoconia and A. flavipes.

It can be found in New South Wales and Queensland Australia.

== See also ==
- List of Amanita species
