= Adesmus niveiceps =

Scientific classification
- Kingdom: Animalia
- Phylum: Arthropoda
- Class: Insecta
- Order: Coleoptera
- Suborder: Polyphaga
- Infraorder: Cucujiformia
- Family: Cerambycidae
- Genus: Adesmus
- Species: A. niveiceps

Binomial name
- Adesmus niveiceps (Aurivillius, 1900)

Synonyms
- Amphionycha niveiceps Aurivillius, 1900

Species of beetle

Adesmus niveiceps is a species of beetle in the family Cerambycidae. It was described by Per Olof Christopher Aurivillius in 1900. It is known from Venezuela.
