= Autochloris completa =

Scientific classification
- Kingdom: Animalia
- Phylum: Arthropoda
- Clade: Pancrustacea
- Class: Insecta
- Order: Lepidoptera
- Superfamily: Noctuoidea
- Family: Erebidae
- Subfamily: Arctiinae
- Genus: Autochloris
- Species: A. completa

Binomial name
- Autochloris completa (Walker, 1854)

Synonyms
- Glaucopis completa Walker, 1854

Species of moth

Autochloris completa is a moth of the subfamily Arctiinae. It was described by Francis Walker in 1854. It is found in Brazil.
