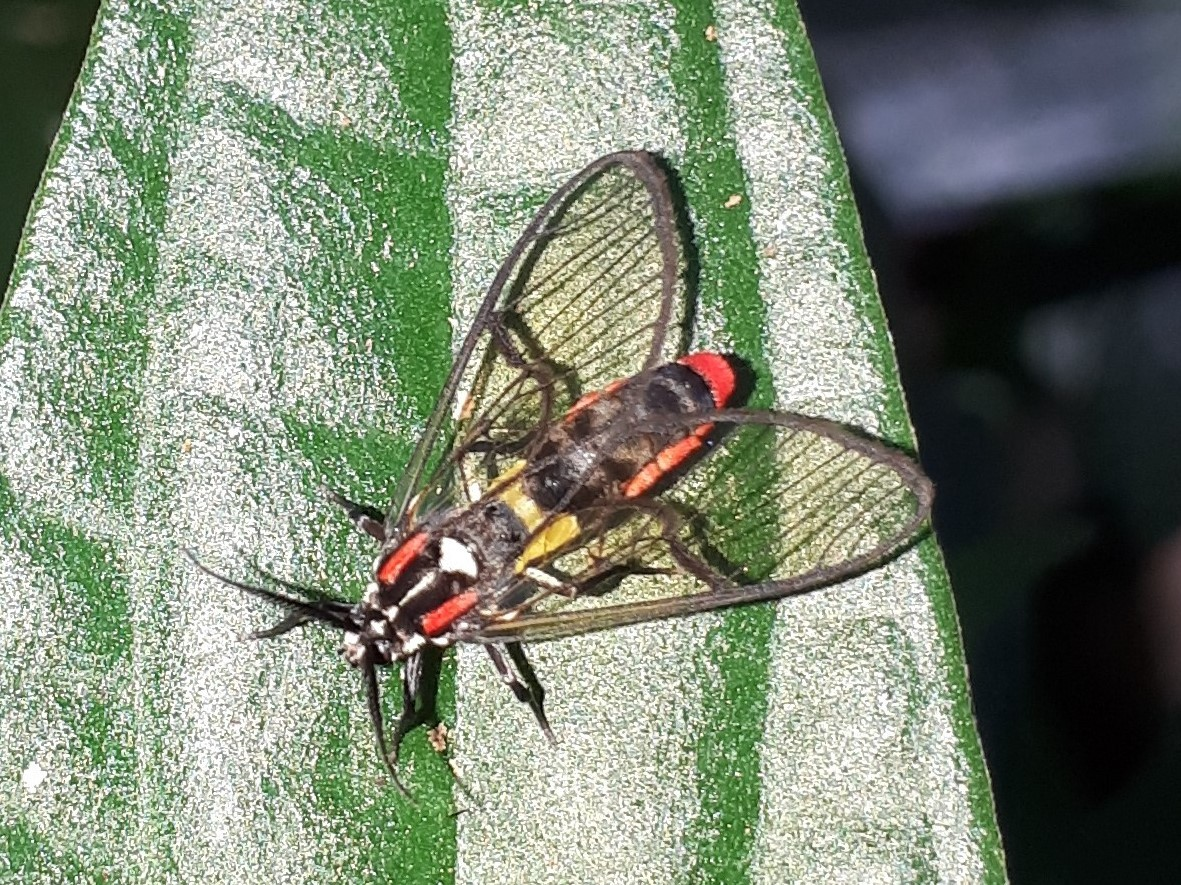
- Argyroeides braco

Scientific classification
- Kingdom: Animalia
- Phylum: Arthropoda
- Class: Insecta
- Order: Lepidoptera
- Superfamily: Noctuoidea
- Family: Erebidae
- Subfamily: Arctiinae
- Subtribe: Euchromiina
- Genus: Argyroeides; Butler, 1876

= Argyroeides =

Genus of moths

Argyroeides is a genus of moths in the subfamily Arctiinae. The genus was erected by Arthur Gardiner Butler in 1876.

== Species ==
- Argyroeides affinis Rothschild, 1911
- Argyroeides augiades H. Druce, 1896
- Argyroeides auranticincta Klages, 1906
- Argyroeides braco Herrich-Schäffer, 1855
- Argyroeides boliviana H. Druce, 1883
- Argyroeides ceres H. Druce, 1893
- Argyroeides eurypon H. Druce, 1884
- Argyroeides flavicincta H. Druce, 1905
- Argyroeides flavicornis Rothschild, 1911
- Argyroeides flavipes Hampson, 1898
- Argyroeides fuscipes Rothschild, 1911
- Argyroeides hadassa H. Druce, 1883
- Argyroeides laurion H. Druce, 1884
- Argyroeides magon Schaus, 1892
- Argyroeides menephron H. Druce, 1884
- Argyroeides minuta H. Druce, 1888
- Argyroeides nephelophora Hampson, 1914
- Argyroeides notha Schaus, 1911
- Argyroeides ophion Walker, 1854
- Argyroeides ortona H. Druce, 1893
- Argyroeides placida H. Druce, 1897
- Argyroeides quindiensis Dognin, 1911
- Argyroeides rubricauda Dyar, 1911
- Argyroeides sanguinea Schaus, 1896
- Argyroeides spectrum Schaus, 1911
- Argyroeides strigula H. Druce, 1896
- Argyroeides tricolor Packard, 1869
- Argyroeides vespina Schaus, 1901
