= Autochloris jansonis =

Scientific classification
- Kingdom: Animalia
- Phylum: Arthropoda
- Clade: Pancrustacea
- Class: Insecta
- Order: Lepidoptera
- Superfamily: Noctuoidea
- Family: Erebidae
- Subfamily: Arctiinae
- Genus: Autochloris
- Species: A. jansonis

Binomial name
- Autochloris jansonis (Butler, 1872)

Synonyms
- Gymnelia jansonis Butler, 1872

Species of moth

Autochloris jansonis is a moth of the subfamily Arctiinae. It was described by Arthur Gardiner Butler in 1872. It is found in Costa Rica, Panama and Colombia.
