= Autochloris crinopoda =

Scientific classification
- Kingdom: Animalia
- Phylum: Arthropoda
- Clade: Pancrustacea
- Class: Insecta
- Order: Lepidoptera
- Superfamily: Noctuoidea
- Family: Erebidae
- Subfamily: Arctiinae
- Genus: Autochloris
- Species: A. crinopoda

Binomial name
- Autochloris crinopoda Kaye, 1918

Synonyms
- Autochloris lutea Kaye, 1919

Species of moth

Autochloris crinopoda is a moth of the subfamily Arctiinae and its class is Insecta. It was described by William James Kaye in 1918. It was described from Cayenne in French Guiana.
