= Adesmus leucodryas =

Scientific classification
- Kingdom: Animalia
- Phylum: Arthropoda
- Class: Insecta
- Order: Coleoptera
- Suborder: Polyphaga
- Infraorder: Cucujiformia
- Family: Cerambycidae
- Genus: Adesmus
- Species: A. leucodryas

Binomial name
- Adesmus leucodryas (Bates, 1881)

Synonyms
- Amphionycha leucodryas Bates, 1881; Hemilophus leucodryas Lameere, 1883

Species of beetle

Adesmus leucodryas is a species of beetle in the family Cerambycidae. It was described by Henry Walter Bates in 1881. It is known from Colombia and Venezuela.
