= Argyroeides nephelophora =

Scientific classification
- Kingdom: Animalia
- Phylum: Arthropoda
- Class: Insecta
- Order: Lepidoptera
- Superfamily: Noctuoidea
- Family: Erebidae
- Subfamily: Arctiinae
- Genus: Argyroeides
- Species: A. nephelophora

Binomial name
- Argyroeides nephelophora (Hampson, 1914)

Synonyms
- Argyroides nephelophora Hampson, 1914

Species of moth

Argyroeides nephelophora is a moth of the subfamily Arctiinae. It was described by George Hampson in 1914. It is found in Paraguay.
