= Adesmus diana =

Scientific classification
- Kingdom: Animalia
- Phylum: Arthropoda
- Class: Insecta
- Order: Coleoptera
- Suborder: Polyphaga
- Infraorder: Cucujiformia
- Family: Cerambycidae
- Genus: Adesmus
- Species: A. diana

Binomial name
- Adesmus diana (Thomson, 1860)

Synonyms
- Amphionycha diana Thomson, 1860; Hemilophus diana Gemminger & Harold, 1873

Species of beetle

Adesmus diana is a species of beetle in the family Cerambycidae. It was described by Thomson in 1860. It is known from Brazil, Colombia, and French Guiana.
