= Polyacanthia simplex =

Scientific classification
- Kingdom: Animalia
- Phylum: Arthropoda
- Class: Insecta
- Order: Coleoptera
- Suborder: Polyphaga
- Infraorder: Cucujiformia
- Family: Cerambycidae
- Genus: Polyacanthia
- Species: P. simplex

Binomial name
- Polyacanthia simplex (Bates, 1874)

Synonyms
- Hybolasius simplex Bates, 1874; Poecilippe simplex (Bates, 1874)

Species of beetle

Polyacanthia simplex is a species of beetle in the family Cerambycidae. It was described by Henry Walter Bates in 1874.
