= Autochloris aroa =

Scientific classification
- Kingdom: Animalia
- Phylum: Arthropoda
- Clade: Pancrustacea
- Class: Insecta
- Order: Lepidoptera
- Superfamily: Noctuoidea
- Family: Erebidae
- Subfamily: Arctiinae
- Genus: Autochloris
- Species: A. aroa

Binomial name
- Autochloris aroa (Schaus, 1894)

Synonyms
- Gymnelia aroa Schaus, 1894

Species of moth

Autochloris aroa is a moth of the subfamily Arctiinae. It was described by William Schaus in 1894. It is found in Venezuela.
