= Adesmus chalumeaui =

Scientific classification
- Kingdom: Animalia
- Phylum: Arthropoda
- Class: Insecta
- Order: Coleoptera
- Suborder: Polyphaga
- Infraorder: Cucujiformia
- Family: Cerambycidae
- Genus: Adesmus
- Species: A. chalumeaui

Binomial name
- Adesmus chalumeaui Touroult, 2004

Species of beetle

Adesmus chalumeaui is a species of beetle in the family Cerambycidae. It was described by Touroult in 2004. It is known from Martinique.
