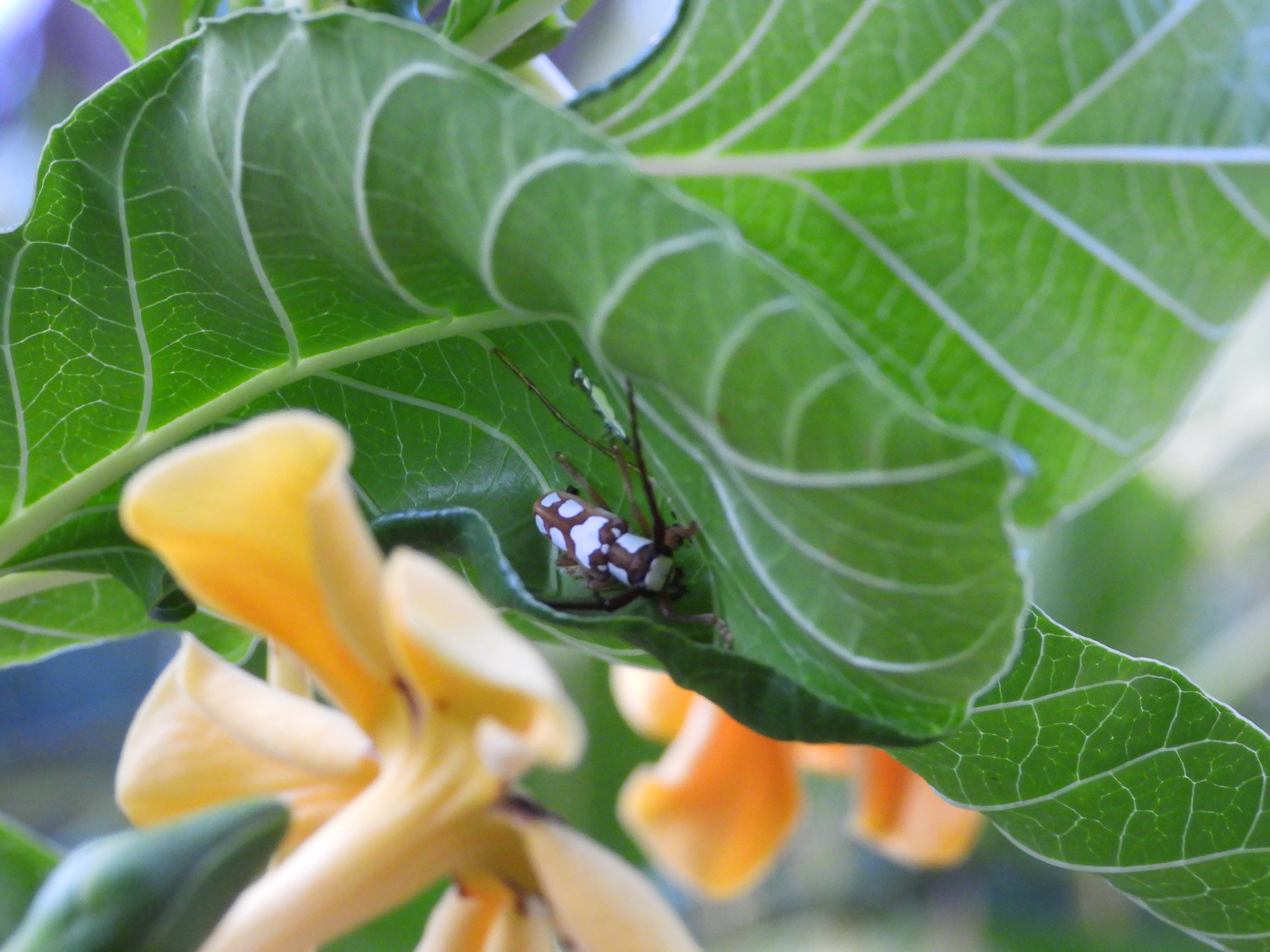

Scientific classification
- Kingdom: Animalia
- Phylum: Arthropoda
- Class: Insecta
- Order: Coleoptera
- Suborder: Polyphaga
- Infraorder: Cucujiformia
- Family: Cerambycidae
- Genus: Adesmus
- Species: A. nevisi

Binomial name
- Adesmus nevisi (Gounelle, 1909)

Synonyms
- Amphionycha nevisi Gounelle, 1909

= Adesmus nevisi =

Species of beetle

Adesmus nevisi is a species of beetle in the family Cerambycidae. It was described by Gounelle in 1909. It is known from Brazil and Bolivia.
