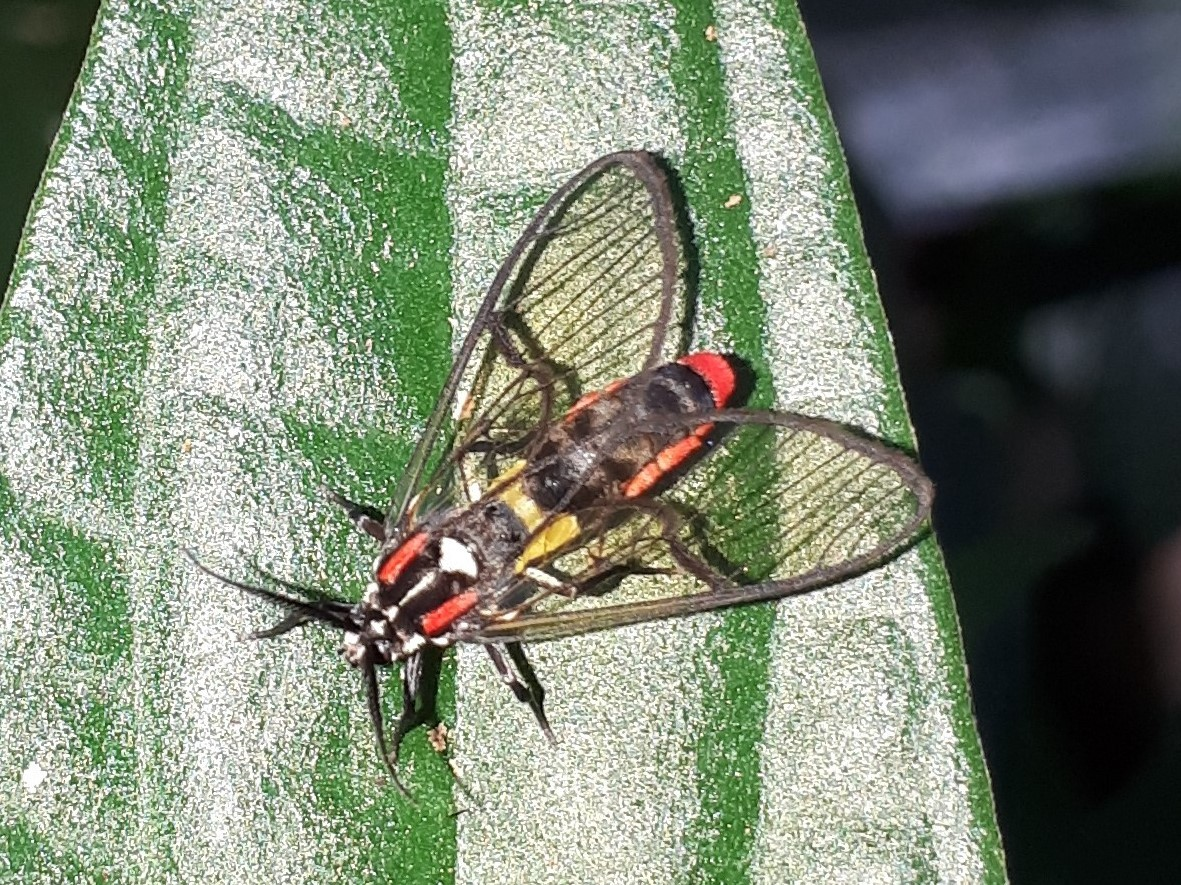

Scientific classification
- Kingdom: Animalia
- Phylum: Arthropoda
- Class: Insecta
- Order: Lepidoptera
- Superfamily: Noctuoidea
- Family: Erebidae
- Subfamily: Arctiinae
- Genus: Argyroeides
- Species: A. braco

Binomial name
- Argyroeides braco (Herrich-Schäffer, 1855)

Synonyms
- Haematerion braco Herrich-Schäffer, [1855]

= Argyroeides braco =

Species of moth

Argyroeides braco is a species of moth in the subfamily Arctiinae. It was first described by Gottlieb August Wilhelm Herrich-Schäffer in 1855. It is found in São Paulo, Brazil.
