= Autochloris caunus =

Scientific classification
- Kingdom: Animalia
- Phylum: Arthropoda
- Clade: Pancrustacea
- Class: Insecta
- Order: Lepidoptera
- Superfamily: Noctuoidea
- Family: Erebidae
- Subfamily: Arctiinae
- Genus: Autochloris
- Species: A. caunus

Binomial name
- Autochloris caunus (Cramer, 1779)

Synonyms
- Sphinx caunus Cramer, 1779

Species of moth

Autochloris caunus is a moth of the subfamily Arctiinae. It was described by Pieter Cramer in 1779. It is found in Suriname and Brazil.
