= Polyacanthia fonscolombei =

Scientific classification
- Kingdom: Animalia
- Phylum: Arthropoda
- Class: Insecta
- Order: Coleoptera
- Suborder: Polyphaga
- Infraorder: Cucujiformia
- Family: Cerambycidae
- Genus: Polyacanthia
- Species: P. fonscolombei

Binomial name
- Polyacanthia fonscolombei Montrouzier, 1861

Synonyms
- Prosacantha fonscolombei (Montrouzier) Thomson, 1864

Species of beetle

Polyacanthia fonscolombei is a species of beetle in the family Cerambycidae. It was described by Xavier Montrouzier in 1861.

== Subspecies ==
- Polyacanthia fonscolombei fonscolombei Montrouzier, 1861
- Polyacanthia fonscolombei hebridarum Breuning, 1950
