= Adesmus nigriventris =

Scientific classification
- Kingdom: Animalia
- Phylum: Arthropoda
- Class: Insecta
- Order: Coleoptera
- Suborder: Polyphaga
- Infraorder: Cucujiformia
- Family: Cerambycidae
- Genus: Adesmus
- Species: A. nigriventris

Binomial name
- Adesmus nigriventris (Fleutiaux & Sallé, 1889)

Synonyms
- Amphionycha nigriventris Fleutiaux & Sallé, 1889

Species of beetle

Adesmus nigriventris is a species of beetle in the family Cerambycidae. It was described by Fleutiaux and Sallé in 1889. It is known from Guadeloupe.
