= Autochloris patagiata =

Scientific classification
- Kingdom: Animalia
- Phylum: Arthropoda
- Clade: Pancrustacea
- Class: Insecta
- Order: Lepidoptera
- Superfamily: Noctuoidea
- Family: Erebidae
- Subfamily: Arctiinae
- Genus: Autochloris
- Species: A. patagiata

Binomial name
- Autochloris patagiata Dyar, 1909

Species of moth

Autochloris patagiata is a moth of the subfamily Arctiinae. It was described by Harrison Gray Dyar Jr. in 1909. It is found in Mexico.
