= Adesmus brunneiceps =

Scientific classification
- Kingdom: Animalia
- Phylum: Arthropoda
- Class: Insecta
- Order: Coleoptera
- Suborder: Polyphaga
- Infraorder: Cucujiformia
- Family: Cerambycidae
- Genus: Adesmus
- Species: A. brunneiceps

Binomial name
- Adesmus brunneiceps (Aurivillius, 1920)

Synonyms
- Adesmus cretaceus Lane, 1965; Amphionycha brunneiceps Aurivillius, 1920

Species of beetle

Adesmus brunneiceps is a species of beetle in the family Cerambycidae. It was described by Per Olof Christopher Aurivillius in 1920. It is known from Brazil.
