= Adesmus sexguttatus =

Scientific classification
- Kingdom: Animalia
- Phylum: Arthropoda
- Class: Insecta
- Order: Coleoptera
- Suborder: Polyphaga
- Infraorder: Cucujiformia
- Family: Cerambycidae
- Genus: Adesmus
- Species: A. sexguttatus

Binomial name
- Adesmus sexguttatus (H. Lucas, 1857)

Synonyms
- Amphionycha 6-guttata Thomson, 1868; Amphionycha sexguttata H. Lucas, 1859; Hemilophus sexguttatus Gemminger & Harold, 1873

Species of beetle

Adesmus sexguttatus is a species of beetle in the family Cerambycidae. It was described by Hippolyte Lucas in 1857. It is known from Argentina and Brazil.
