= Adesmus ventralis =

Scientific classification
- Kingdom: Animalia
- Phylum: Arthropoda
- Class: Insecta
- Order: Coleoptera
- Suborder: Polyphaga
- Infraorder: Cucujiformia
- Family: Cerambycidae
- Genus: Adesmus
- Species: A. ventralis

Binomial name
- Adesmus ventralis (Gahan, 1894)

Synonyms
- Amphionycha ventralis Gahan, 1894

Species of beetle

Adesmus ventralis is a species of beetle in the family Cerambycidae. It was described by Charles Joseph Gahan in 1894. It is known from Costa Rica.
