= Argyroeides rubricauda =

Scientific classification
- Kingdom: Animalia
- Phylum: Arthropoda
- Class: Insecta
- Order: Lepidoptera
- Superfamily: Noctuoidea
- Family: Erebidae
- Subfamily: Arctiinae
- Genus: Argyroeides
- Species: A. rubricauda

Binomial name
- Argyroeides rubricauda Dyar, 1911

Species of moth

Argyroeides rubricauda is a moth of the subfamily Arctiinae. It was described by Harrison Gray Dyar Jr. in 1911. It is found in Colombia.
