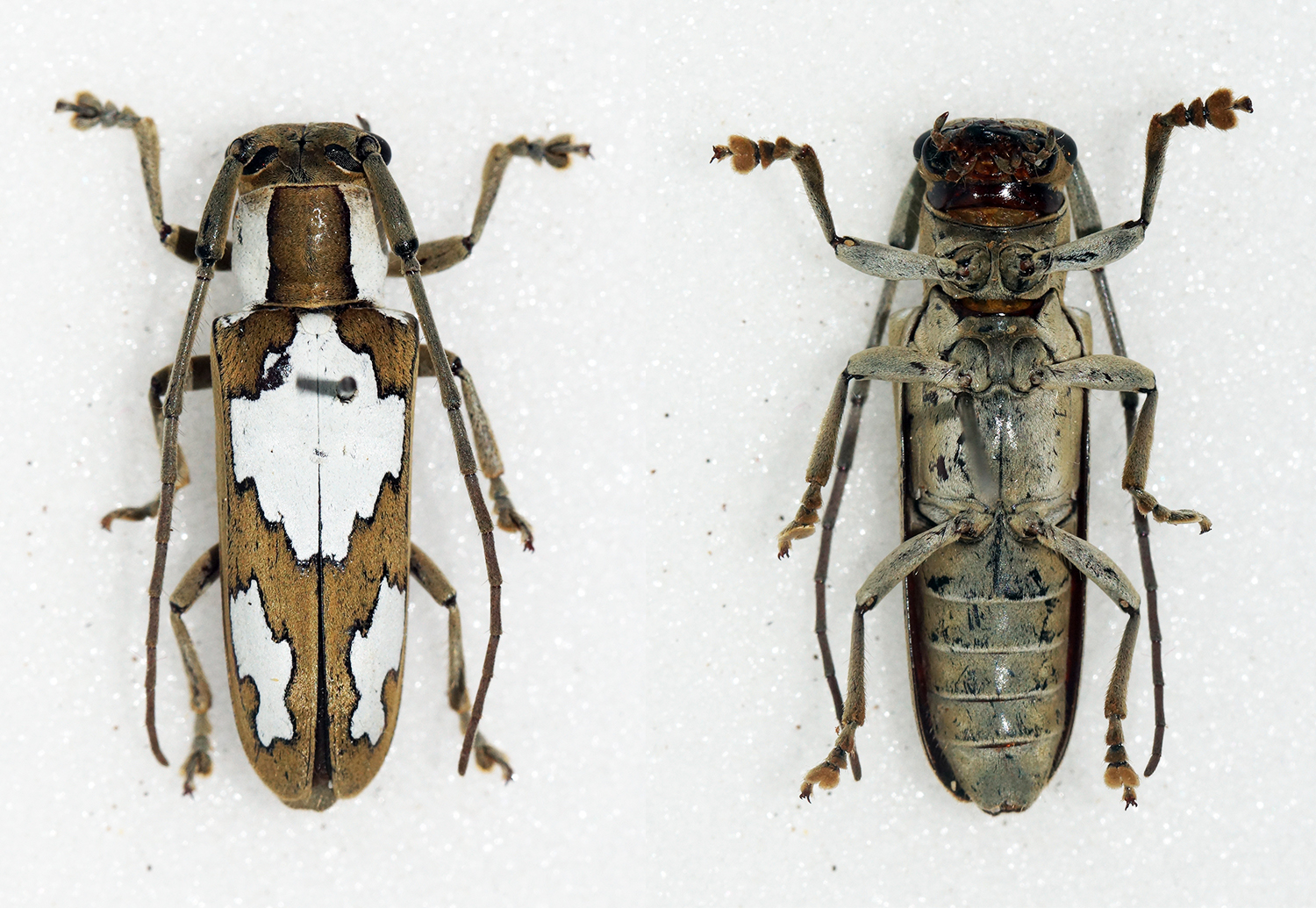
- Adesmus divus

Scientific classification
- Kingdom: Animalia
- Phylum: Arthropoda
- Class: Insecta
- Order: Coleoptera
- Suborder: Polyphaga
- Infraorder: Cucujiformia
- Family: Cerambycidae
- Tribe: Hemilophini
- Genus: Adesmus; Lepeletier & Audinet-Serville in Latreille, 1825

= Adesmus =

Genus of beetles

Adesmus is a genus of longhorn beetles of the subfamily Lamiinae, containing the following species:

- Adesmus acanga Galileo & Martins, 1999
- Adesmus acangauna Martins & Galileo, 2004
- Adesmus albiventris (Bates, 1881)
- Adesmus basalis Fuchs, 1970
- Adesmus bicolor (Gahan, 1889)
- Adesmus bisellatus (Bates, 1881)
- Adesmus borgmeieri (Lane, 1976)
- Adesmus brunneiceps (Aurivillius, 1920)
- Adesmus calca Galileo & Martins, 2005
- Adesmus chalumeaui Touroult, 2004
- Adesmus charis (Bates, 1881)
- Adesmus clathratus (Gistel, 1848)
- Adesmus collaris Melzer, 1931
- Adesmus colligatus (Redtenbacher, 1867)
- Adesmus diana (Thomson, 1860)
- Adesmus dignus Melzer, 1931
- Adesmus divus (Chabrillac, 1857)
- Adesmus facetus Martins & Galileo, 2008
- Adesmus fortunei Lingafelter, 2013
- Adesmus fulvicornis (Bates, 1881)
- Adesmus griseus (Aurivillius, 1900)
- Adesmus guttatus Galileo & Martins, 2005
- Adesmus hemispilus (Germar, 1821)
- Adesmus hipposiderus Galileo & Martins, 2005
- Adesmus hovorei Martins & Galileo, 2004
- Adesmus icambi Martins & Galileo, 2009
- Adesmus juninensis Galileo & Martins, 1999
- Adesmus laetus (Bates, 1881)
- Adesmus leucodryas (Bates, 1881)
- Adesmus meinerti (Aurivillius, 1900)
- Adesmus monnei Galileo & Martins, 2009
- Adesmus moruna Martins & Galileo, 2008
- Adesmus mosapyra Galileo & Martins, 2006
- Adesmus murutinga Martins & Galileo, 2004
- Adesmus nevisi (Gounelle, 1909)
- Adesmus nigriventris (Fleutiaux & Sallé, 1889)
- Adesmus nigrocinctus (Gahan, 1889)
- Adesmus nigrolineatus Martins & Galileo, 2008
- Adesmus niveiceps (Aurivillius, 1900)
- Adesmus ocellatus Galileo & Martins, 2005
- Adesmus paradiana Galileo & Martins, 2004
- Adesmus phoebinus (Aurivillius, 1900)
- Adesmus pilatus Galileo & Martins, 2005
- Adesmus pirauna Galileo & Martins, 1999
- Adesmus pluricostatus (Bates, 1881)
- Adesmus postilenatus (Bates, 1881)
- Adesmus pulchellus Galileo & Martins, 1999
- Adesmus pysasu Galileo & Martins, 1999
- Adesmus quadricinctus Galileo & Martins, 1999
- Adesmus sannio Melzer, 1931
- Adesmus seabrai Lane, 1959
- Adesmus sexguttatus (Lucas, 1857)
- Adesmus sexlineatus (Bates, 1881)
- Adesmus stellatus Galileo & Martins, 2005
- Adesmus stephanus (Aurivillius, 1900)
- Adesmus temporalis (Aurivillius, 1908)
- Adesmus tribalteatus (Bates, 1881)
- Adesmus turrialba Galileo & Martins, 1999
- Adesmus urubu Galileo & Martins, 1999
- Adesmus ventralis (Gahan, 1894)
- Adesmus verticalis (Germar, 1824)
- Adesmus vilhena Galileo & Martins, 1999
- Adesmus vulcanicus Galileo & Martins, 1999
- Adesmus windsori Martins & Galileo, 2004
