= Autochloris cuma =

Scientific classification
- Kingdom: Animalia
- Phylum: Arthropoda
- Clade: Pancrustacea
- Class: Insecta
- Order: Lepidoptera
- Superfamily: Noctuoidea
- Family: Erebidae
- Subfamily: Arctiinae
- Genus: Autochloris
- Species: A. cuma

Binomial name
- Autochloris cuma (H. Druce, 1897)

Synonyms
- Gymnelia cuma H. Druce, 1897

Species of moth

Autochloris cuma is a moth of the subfamily Arctiinae. It was described by Herbert Druce in 1897. It is found in Colombia and Bolivia.
