= Argyroeides flavicincta =

Scientific classification
- Domain: Eukaryota
- Kingdom: Animalia
- Phylum: Arthropoda
- Class: Insecta
- Order: Lepidoptera
- Superfamily: Noctuoidea
- Family: Erebidae
- Subfamily: Arctiinae
- Genus: Argyroeides
- Species: A. flavicincta

Binomial name
- Argyroeides flavicincta H. Druce, 1905

Synonyms
- Argyroeides suapurensis Klages, 1906

Species of moth

Argyroeides flavicincta is a moth of the subfamily Arctiinae. It was described by Herbert Druce in 1905. It is found in Venezuela.
