= Autochloris collocata =

Scientific classification
- Kingdom: Animalia
- Phylum: Arthropoda
- Clade: Pancrustacea
- Class: Insecta
- Order: Lepidoptera
- Superfamily: Noctuoidea
- Family: Erebidae
- Subfamily: Arctiinae
- Genus: Autochloris
- Species: A. collocata

Binomial name
- Autochloris collocata (Walker, 1864)

Synonyms
- Gymnelia collocata Walker, 1864

Species of moth

Autochloris collocata is a moth of the subfamily Arctiinae. It was described by Francis Walker in 1864. It is found in the Amazon region.
