= Argyroeides augiades =

Scientific classification
- Domain: Eukaryota
- Kingdom: Animalia
- Phylum: Arthropoda
- Class: Insecta
- Order: Lepidoptera
- Superfamily: Noctuoidea
- Family: Erebidae
- Subfamily: Arctiinae
- Genus: Argyroeides
- Species: A. augiades

Binomial name
- Argyroeides augiades (H. Druce, 1896)

Synonyms
- Trichura augiades H. Druce, 1896

Species of moth

Argyroeides augiades is a moth of the subfamily Arctiinae. It was described by Herbert Druce in 1896. It is found in Bolivia.
