= Adesmus bicolor =

Scientific classification
- Kingdom: Animalia
- Phylum: Arthropoda
- Class: Insecta
- Order: Coleoptera
- Suborder: Polyphaga
- Infraorder: Cucujiformia
- Family: Cerambycidae
- Genus: Adesmus
- Species: A. bicolor

Binomial name
- Adesmus bicolor (Gahan, 1889)

Species of beetle

Adesmus bicolor is a species of beetle in the family Cerambycidae. It was described by Gahan in 1889.
