= Autochloris xenedorus =

Scientific classification
- Kingdom: Animalia
- Phylum: Arthropoda
- Clade: Pancrustacea
- Class: Insecta
- Order: Lepidoptera
- Superfamily: Noctuoidea
- Family: Erebidae
- Subfamily: Arctiinae
- Genus: Autochloris
- Species: A. xenedorus

Binomial name
- Autochloris xenedorus (H. Druce, 1884)

Synonyms
- Gymnelia xenedorus H. Druce, 1884

Species of moth

Autochloris xenedorus is a moth of the subfamily Arctiinae. It was described by Herbert Druce in 1884. It is found in Mexico and Guatemala.
