= Autochloris quadrimacula =

Scientific classification
- Kingdom: Animalia
- Phylum: Arthropoda
- Clade: Pancrustacea
- Class: Insecta
- Order: Lepidoptera
- Superfamily: Noctuoidea
- Family: Erebidae
- Subfamily: Arctiinae
- Genus: Autochloris
- Species: A. quadrimacula

Binomial name
- Autochloris quadrimacula Dognin, 1923

Species of moth

Autochloris quadrimacula is a moth of the subfamily Arctiinae. It was described by Paul Dognin in 1923. It is found in Colombia.
