= Polyacanthia medialis =

Scientific classification
- Kingdom: Animalia
- Phylum: Arthropoda
- Class: Insecta
- Order: Coleoptera
- Suborder: Polyphaga
- Infraorder: Cucujiformia
- Family: Cerambycidae
- Genus: Polyacanthia
- Species: P. medialis

Binomial name
- Polyacanthia medialis (Sharp, 1886)

Synonyms
- Poecilippe medialis Sharp, 1886

Species of beetle

Polyacanthia medialis is a species of beetle in the family Cerambycidae. It was described by Sharp in 1886, originally under the genus Poecilippe.
