= Argyroeides vespina =

Scientific classification
- Domain: Eukaryota
- Kingdom: Animalia
- Phylum: Arthropoda
- Class: Insecta
- Order: Lepidoptera
- Superfamily: Noctuoidea
- Family: Erebidae
- Subfamily: Arctiinae
- Genus: Argyroeides
- Species: A. vespina

Binomial name
- Argyroeides vespina Schaus, 1901

Synonyms
- Argyroeides lydia Druce, 1903

Species of moth

Argyroeides vespina is a moth of the subfamily Arctiinae. It was described by William Schaus in 1901. It is found in Paraguay and Brazil.
