= Adesmus colligatus =

Scientific classification
- Kingdom: Animalia
- Phylum: Arthropoda
- Class: Insecta
- Order: Coleoptera
- Suborder: Polyphaga
- Infraorder: Cucujiformia
- Family: Cerambycidae
- Genus: Adesmus
- Species: A. colligatus

Binomial name
- Adesmus colligatus (Redtenbacher, 1867)

Synonyms
- Amphionycha colligata Redtenbacher, 1868; Hemilophus colligatus (Redtenbacher, 1868); Adesmus calligata (Redtenbacher, 1868) (misspelling); Adesmus colligata (Redtenbacher, 1868) (misspelling)

Species of beetle

Adesmus colligatus is a species of beetle in the family Cerambycidae. It was described by Redtenbacher in 1867. It is known from Brazil, Argentina, and Paraguay.
