= Autochloris mathani =

Scientific classification
- Kingdom: Animalia
- Phylum: Arthropoda
- Clade: Pancrustacea
- Class: Insecta
- Order: Lepidoptera
- Superfamily: Noctuoidea
- Family: Erebidae
- Subfamily: Arctiinae
- Genus: Autochloris
- Species: A. mathani

Binomial name
- Autochloris mathani Rothschild, 1911

Species of moth

Autochloris mathani is a moth of the subfamily Arctiinae. It was described by Rothschild in 1911. It is found in Colombia.
