= Argyroeides affinis =

Scientific classification
- Domain: Eukaryota
- Kingdom: Animalia
- Phylum: Arthropoda
- Class: Insecta
- Order: Lepidoptera
- Superfamily: Noctuoidea
- Family: Erebidae
- Subfamily: Arctiinae
- Genus: Argyroeides
- Species: A. affinis

Binomial name
- Argyroeides affinis Rothschild, 1911

Species of moth

Argyroeides affinis is a moth of the subfamily Arctiinae. It was described by Rothschild in 1911. It is found in Brazilia.
