= Autochloris serra =

Scientific classification
- Kingdom: Animalia
- Phylum: Arthropoda
- Clade: Pancrustacea
- Class: Insecta
- Order: Lepidoptera
- Superfamily: Noctuoidea
- Family: Erebidae
- Subfamily: Arctiinae
- Genus: Autochloris
- Species: A. serra

Binomial name
- Autochloris serra (Schaus, 1892)

Synonyms
- Gymnelia serra Schaus, 1892

Species of moth

Autochloris serra is a moth of the subfamily Arctiinae. It was described by William Schaus in 1892. It is found in Brazil.
