= Autochloris enagrus =

Scientific classification
- Kingdom: Animalia
- Phylum: Arthropoda
- Clade: Pancrustacea
- Class: Insecta
- Order: Lepidoptera
- Superfamily: Noctuoidea
- Family: Erebidae
- Subfamily: Arctiinae
- Genus: Autochloris
- Species: A. enagrus

Binomial name
- Autochloris enagrus (Cramer, 1780)

Synonyms
- Sphinx enagrus Cramer, 1780; Gymnelia dexamene Druce, 1897; Bombiliodes enagrus

Species of moth

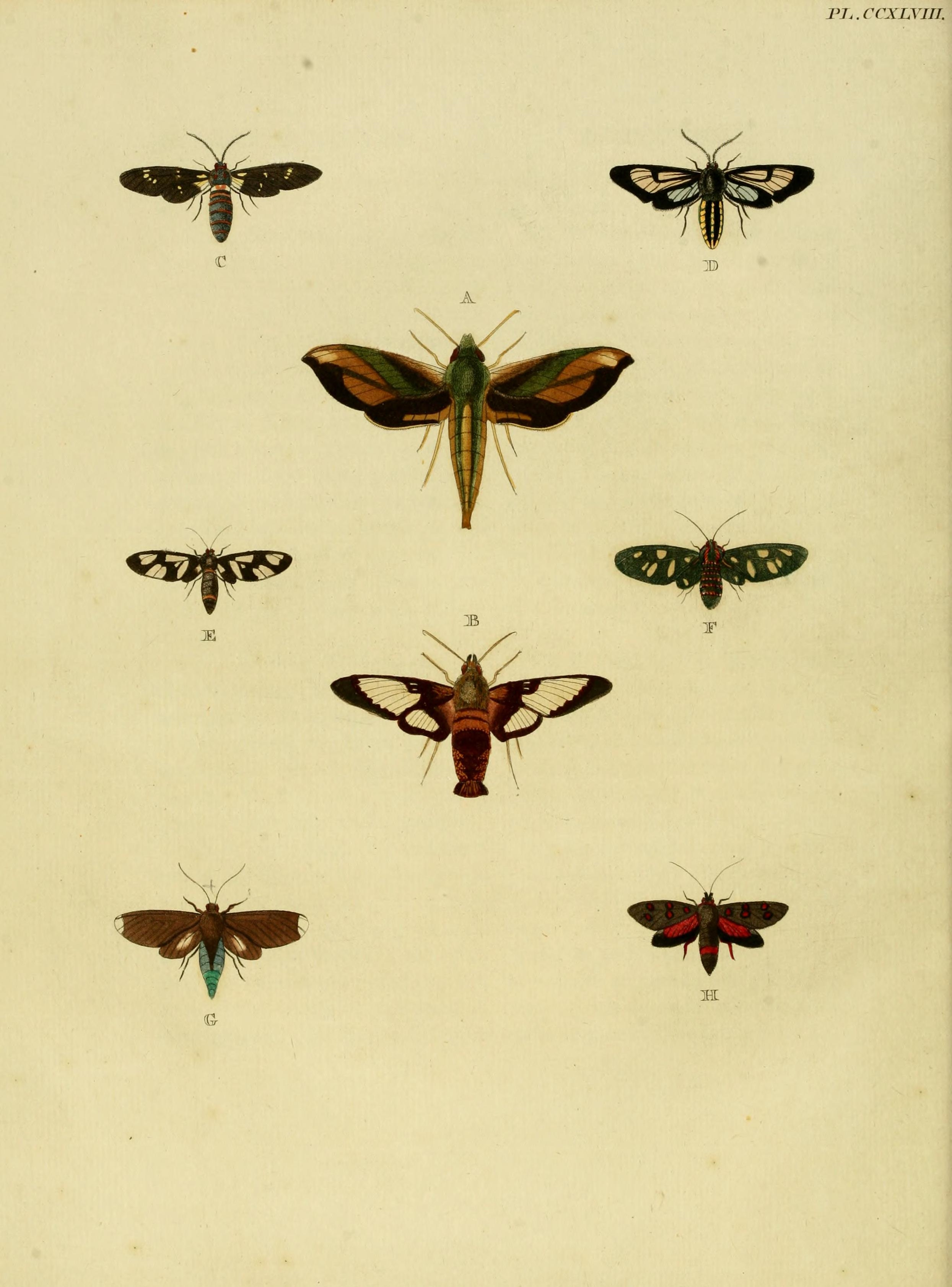
Authors: Cramer and Stoll

Autochloris enagrus is a moth of the subfamily Arctiinae. It was described by Pieter Cramer in 1780. It is found in Brazil (Tefé) and Suriname.
