= Polyacanthia strandi =

Scientific classification
- Kingdom: Animalia
- Phylum: Arthropoda
- Class: Insecta
- Order: Coleoptera
- Suborder: Polyphaga
- Infraorder: Cucujiformia
- Family: Cerambycidae
- Genus: Polyacanthia
- Species: P. strandi

Binomial name
- Polyacanthia strandi Breuning, 1939

Species of beetle

Polyacanthia strandi is a species of beetle in the family Cerambycidae. It was described by Stephan von Breuning in 1939. It is known from Australia.

It is 12.5 mm long and 4.5 mm wide, and its type locality is Tamborine Mountain, Queensland. It was named in honor of Embrik Strand, in whose Festschrift the species description was written.
