= Autochloris whitelyi =

Scientific classification
- Kingdom: Animalia
- Phylum: Arthropoda
- Clade: Pancrustacea
- Class: Insecta
- Order: Lepidoptera
- Superfamily: Noctuoidea
- Family: Erebidae
- Subfamily: Arctiinae
- Genus: Autochloris
- Species: A. whitelyi

Binomial name
- Autochloris whitelyi (H. Druce, 1883)

Synonyms
- Gymnelia whitelyi H. Druce, 1883

Species of moth

Autochloris whitelyi is a moth of the subfamily Arctiinae. It was described by Herbert Druce in 1883. It is found in Peru.
