= Argyroeides minuta =

Scientific classification
- Domain: Eukaryota
- Kingdom: Animalia
- Phylum: Arthropoda
- Class: Insecta
- Order: Lepidoptera
- Superfamily: Noctuoidea
- Family: Erebidae
- Subfamily: Arctiinae
- Genus: Argyroeides
- Species: A. minuta

Binomial name
- Argyroeides minuta H. Druce, 1888

Species of moth

Argyroeides minuta is a moth of the subfamily Arctiinae. It was described by Herbert Druce in 1888. It is found in Honduras.
