= Adesmus borgmeieri =

Scientific classification
- Kingdom: Animalia
- Phylum: Arthropoda
- Class: Insecta
- Order: Coleoptera
- Suborder: Polyphaga
- Infraorder: Cucujiformia
- Family: Cerambycidae
- Genus: Adesmus
- Species: A. borgmeieri

Binomial name
- Adesmus borgmeieri (Lane, 1976)

Synonyms
- Somateucharis borgmeieri Lane, 1976

Species of beetle

Adesmus borgmeieri is a species of beetle in the family Cerambycidae. It was described by Lane in 1976. It is known from Brazil.
