= Polyacanthia =

Scientific classification
- Kingdom: Animalia
- Phylum: Arthropoda
- Class: Insecta
- Order: Coleoptera
- Suborder: Polyphaga
- Infraorder: Cucujiformia
- Family: Cerambycidae
- Tribe: Pogonocherini
- Genus: Polyacanthia

Genus of beetles

Polyacanthia is a genus of longhorn beetles of the subfamily Lamiinae, containing the following species:

- Polyacanthia femoralis (Sharp, 1886)
- Polyacanthia flavipes (White, 1846)
- Polyacanthia fonscolombei Montrouzier, 1861
- Polyacanthia medialis (Sharp, 1886)
- Polyacanthia simplex (Bates, 1874)
- Polyacanthia stictica (Bates, 1874)
- Polyacanthia strandi Breuning, 1939
