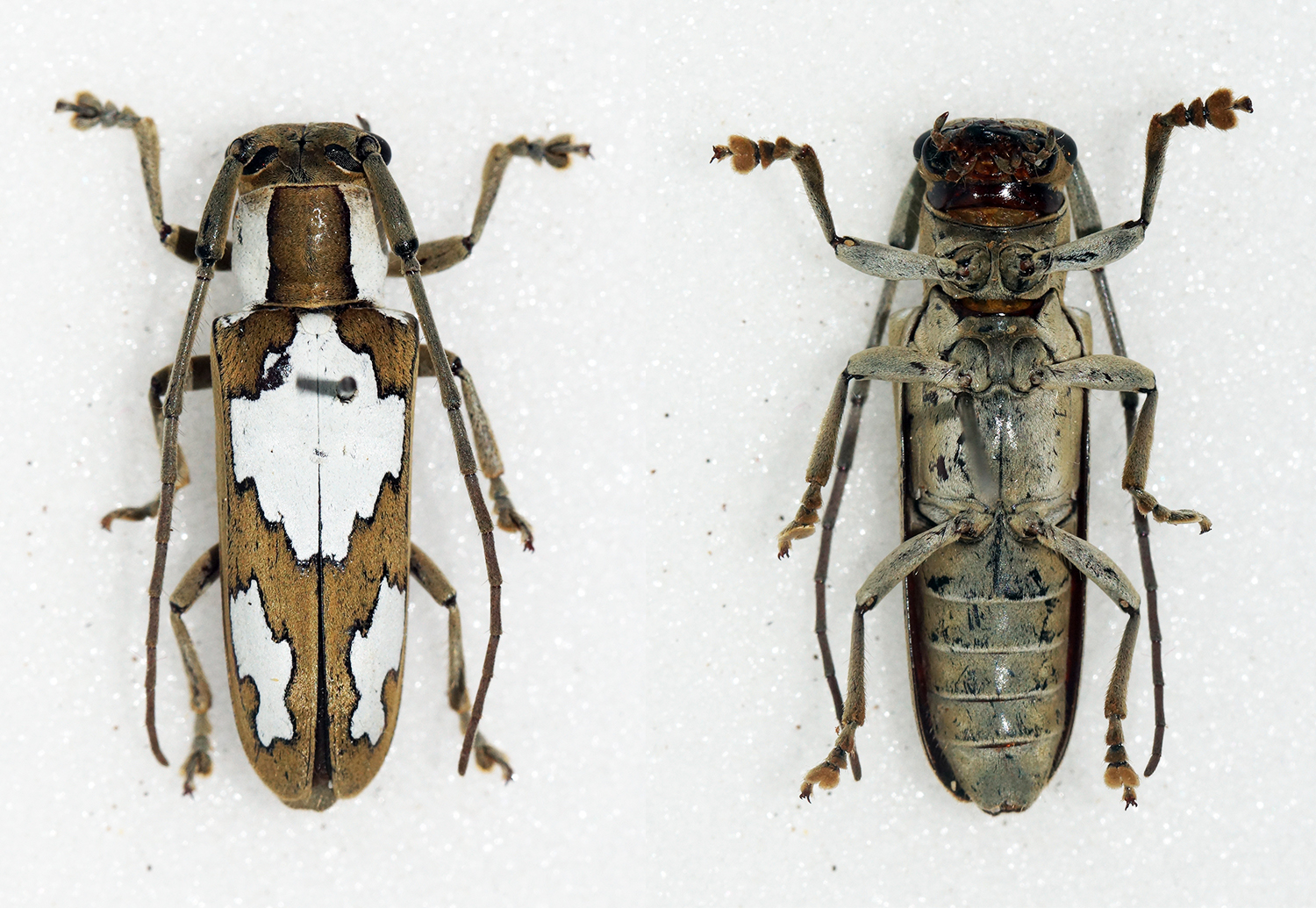

Scientific classification
- Kingdom: Animalia
- Phylum: Arthropoda
- Class: Insecta
- Order: Coleoptera
- Suborder: Polyphaga
- Infraorder: Cucujiformia
- Family: Cerambycidae
- Genus: Adesmus
- Species: A. divus

Binomial name
- Adesmus divus (Chabrillac, 1857)

Synonyms
- Amphionycha diva (Chabrillac, 1857); Amphionycha procera Gahan, 1889; Hemilophus divus Chabrillac, 1857

= Adesmus divus =

Species of beetle

Adesmus divus is a species of beetle in the family Cerambycidae. It was described by Chabrillac in 1857. They can be found in Bolivia, Argentina, Paraguay and Brazil.
