= Argyroeides laurion =

Scientific classification
- Domain: Eukaryota
- Kingdom: Animalia
- Phylum: Arthropoda
- Class: Insecta
- Order: Lepidoptera
- Superfamily: Noctuoidea
- Family: Erebidae
- Subfamily: Arctiinae
- Genus: Argyroeides
- Species: A. laurion

Binomial name
- Argyroeides laurion H. Druce, 1884

Panamanian species of moth

Argyroeides laurion is a moth of the subfamily Arctiinae. It was described by Herbert Druce in 1884. It is found in Panama.
