= Adesmus temporalis =

Scientific classification
- Kingdom: Animalia
- Phylum: Arthropoda
- Class: Insecta
- Order: Coleoptera
- Suborder: Polyphaga
- Infraorder: Cucujiformia
- Family: Cerambycidae
- Genus: Adesmus
- Species: A. temporalis

Binomial name
- Adesmus temporalis (Aurivillius, 1908)

Synonyms
- Amphionycha temporalis Aurivillius, 1909

Species of beetle

Adesmus temporalis is a species of beetle in the family Cerambycidae. It was described by Per Olof Christopher Aurivillius in 1908. It is known from Bolivia.
