= Adesmus basalis =

Scientific classification
- Kingdom: Animalia
- Phylum: Arthropoda
- Class: Insecta
- Order: Coleoptera
- Suborder: Polyphaga
- Infraorder: Cucujiformia
- Family: Cerambycidae
- Genus: Adesmus
- Species: A. basalis

Binomial name
- Adesmus basalis E. Fuchs, 1970

Species of beetle

Adesmus basalis is a species of beetle in the family Cerambycidae. It was described by Ernst Fuchs in 1970. It is known from Ecuador.
