= Polyacanthia femoralis =

Scientific classification
- Kingdom: Animalia
- Phylum: Arthropoda
- Class: Insecta
- Order: Coleoptera
- Suborder: Polyphaga
- Infraorder: Cucujiformia
- Family: Cerambycidae
- Genus: Polyacanthia
- Species: P. femoralis

Binomial name
- Polyacanthia femoralis (Sharp, 1886)

Synonyms
- Poecilippe femoralis Sharp, 1886

Species of beetle

Polyacanthia femoralis is a species of beetle in the family Cerambycidae. It was described by Sharp in 1886, originally under the genus Poecilippe.
