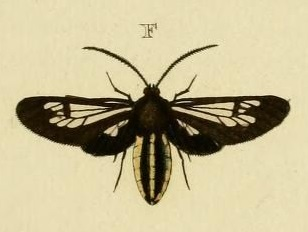

Scientific classification
- Kingdom: Animalia
- Phylum: Arthropoda
- Clade: Pancrustacea
- Class: Insecta
- Order: Lepidoptera
- Superfamily: Noctuoidea
- Family: Erebidae
- Subfamily: Arctiinae
- Genus: Autochloris
- Species: A. almon

Binomial name
- Autochloris almon (Cramer, 1779)

Synonyms
- Sphinx almon Cramer, [1779]

= Autochloris almon =

Species of moth

Autochloris almon is a moth of the subfamily Arctiinae. It was described by Pieter Cramer in 1779. It is found in Suriname and Brazil.
