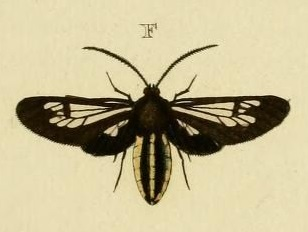
- A. almon.

Scientific classification
- Domain: Eukaryota
- Kingdom: Animalia
- Phylum: Arthropoda
- Class: Insecta
- Order: Lepidoptera
- Superfamily: Noctuoidea
- Family: Erebidae
- Subfamily: Arctiinae
- Genus: Autochloris; Hübner, [1819]

Type species
- Sphinx almon Cramer, [1779]

Synonyms
- Schasiura Butler, 1877

= Autochloris =

Genus of moths

Autochloris is a genus of moths in the subfamily Arctiinae.

== Species ==
Species as of 2017:

- Autochloris almon (Cramer, [1779])
- Autochloris aroa (Schaus, 1894)
- Autochloris bijuncta (Walker, 1856)
- Autochloris buchwaldi Rothschild, 1931
- Autochloris caunus (Cramer, [1779])
- Autochloris cincta (Schaus, 1905)
- Autochloris collocata (Walker, [1865])
- Autochloris completa (Walker, 1854)
- Autochloris crinopoda Kaye, 1918
- Autochloris cuma (Druce, 1897)
- Autochloris ectomelaena (Hampson, 1898)
- Autochloris enagrus (Cramer, [1779])
- Autochloris ethela Schaus, 1924
- Autochloris flavicosta Rothschild, 1931
- Autochloris flavipes Draudt, 1915
- Autochloris flavosignata Rothschild, 1931
- Autochloris jansonis (Butler, 1872)
- Autochloris laennus (Walker, 1854)
- Autochloris magnifica Rothschild, 1931
- Autochloris mathani Rothschild, 1911
- Autochloris nigridior Rothschild, 1931
- Autochloris patagiata Dyar, 1909
- Autochloris proterva Draudt, 1915
- Autochloris quadrimacula Dognin, 1923
- Autochloris serra (Schaus, 1892)
- Autochloris simplex (Walker, 1856)
- Autochloris simulans (Druce, 1909)
- Autochloris solimoes Schaus, 1924
- Autochloris suffumata Draudt, 1915
- Autochloris trinitatis Rothschild
- Autochloris umbratus Fleming, 1950
- Autochloris vetusta Zerny, 1931
- Autochloris vitristriga (Druce, 1897)
- Autochloris whitelyi (Druce, 1883)
- Autochloris xanthogastroides (Schaus, 1901)
- Autochloris xenedorus (Druce, 1884)
