= Autochloris ethela =

Scientific classification
- Kingdom: Animalia
- Phylum: Arthropoda
- Clade: Pancrustacea
- Class: Insecta
- Order: Lepidoptera
- Superfamily: Noctuoidea
- Family: Erebidae
- Subfamily: Arctiinae
- Genus: Autochloris
- Species: A. ethela

Binomial name
- Autochloris ethela Schaus, 1924

Species of moth

Autochloris ethela is a moth of the subfamily Arctiinae. It was described by William Schaus in 1924. It is found in Brazil. ]
