= Adesmus laetus =

Scientific classification
- Kingdom: Animalia
- Phylum: Arthropoda
- Class: Insecta
- Order: Coleoptera
- Suborder: Polyphaga
- Infraorder: Cucujiformia
- Family: Cerambycidae
- Genus: Adesmus
- Species: A. laetus

Binomial name
- Adesmus laetus (Bates, 1881)

Synonyms
- Adesmus laetus var. estriatus Plavilstshikov, 1927; Amphionycha laeta Bates, 1881; Hemilophus laetus Lameere, 1883

Species of beetle

Adesmus laetus is a species of beetle in the family Cerambycidae. It was described by Henry Walter Bates in 1881. It is known from Colombia, Peru, and Venezuela.
