= Autochloris simulans =

Scientific classification
- Kingdom: Animalia
- Phylum: Arthropoda
- Clade: Pancrustacea
- Class: Insecta
- Order: Lepidoptera
- Superfamily: Noctuoidea
- Family: Erebidae
- Subfamily: Arctiinae
- Genus: Autochloris
- Species: A. simulans

Binomial name
- Autochloris simulans (H. Druce, 1909)

Synonyms
- Bombilioides simulans H. Druce, 1909

Species of moth

Autochloris simulans is a moth of the subfamily Arctiinae. It was described by Herbert Druce in 1909. It is found in French Guiana.
