= Autochloris bijuncta =

Scientific classification
- Kingdom: Animalia
- Phylum: Arthropoda
- Clade: Pancrustacea
- Class: Insecta
- Order: Lepidoptera
- Superfamily: Noctuoidea
- Family: Erebidae
- Subfamily: Arctiinae
- Genus: Autochloris
- Species: A. bijuncta

Binomial name
- Autochloris bijuncta (Walker, 1856)

Synonyms
- Gymnelia bijuncta Walker, 1856; Gymnelia consociata Walker, 1864

Species of moth

Autochloris bijuncta is a moth of the subfamily Arctiinae. It was described by Francis Walker in 1856. It is found in the Amazon region.
