= Autochloris vetusta =

Scientific classification
- Kingdom: Animalia
- Phylum: Arthropoda
- Clade: Pancrustacea
- Class: Insecta
- Order: Lepidoptera
- Superfamily: Noctuoidea
- Family: Erebidae
- Subfamily: Arctiinae
- Genus: Autochloris
- Species: A. vetusta

Binomial name
- Autochloris vetusta Zerny, 1931

Species of moth

Autochloris vetusta is a moth of the subfamily Arctiinae. It was described by Hans Zerny in 1931.
