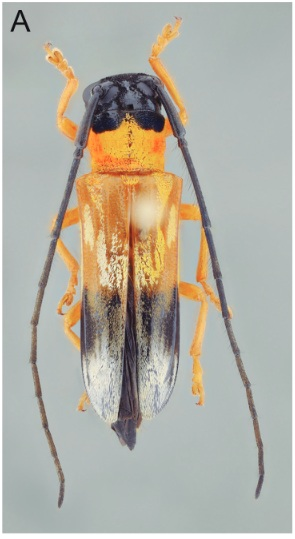

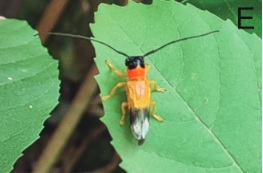

Scientific classification
- Kingdom: Animalia
- Phylum: Arthropoda
- Clade: Pancrustacea
- Class: Insecta
- Order: Coleoptera
- Suborder: Polyphaga
- Infraorder: Cucujiformia
- Family: Cerambycidae
- Genus: Adesmus
- Species: A. verticalis

Binomial name
- Adesmus verticalis (Germar, 1824)

Synonyms
- Amphionycha verticalis Thomson, 1868; Hemilophus nigriceps Castelnau, 1840; Hemilophus verticalis Gemminger & Harold, 1873; Saperda verticalis Germar, 1824

= Adesmus verticalis =

Species of beetle

Adesmus verticalis is a species of beetle in the family Cerambycidae. It was described by Ernst Friedrich Germar in 1824. It is known from Argentina, Brazil and Paraguay.
