= Adesmus dignus =

Scientific classification
- Kingdom: Animalia
- Phylum: Arthropoda
- Class: Insecta
- Order: Coleoptera
- Suborder: Polyphaga
- Infraorder: Cucujiformia
- Family: Cerambycidae
- Genus: Adesmus
- Species: A. dignus

Binomial name
- Adesmus dignus Melzer, 1931

Species of beetle

Adesmus dignus is a species of beetle in the family Cerambycidae. It was described by Melzer in 1931. It is known from Brazil.
