= Adesmus tribalteatus =

Scientific classification
- Kingdom: Animalia
- Phylum: Arthropoda
- Class: Insecta
- Order: Coleoptera
- Suborder: Polyphaga
- Infraorder: Cucujiformia
- Family: Cerambycidae
- Genus: Adesmus
- Species: A. tribalteatus

Binomial name
- Adesmus tribalteatus (Bates, 1881)

Synonyms
- Amphionycha tribeltata Bates, 1881; Hemilophus tribalteatus Lameere, 1883

Species of beetle

Adesmus tribalteatus is a species of beetle in the family Cerambycidae. It was described by Henry Walter Bates in 1881. It is known from Brazil, Peru, and Bolivia.
