= Autochloris magnifica =

Scientific classification
- Kingdom: Animalia
- Phylum: Arthropoda
- Clade: Pancrustacea
- Class: Insecta
- Order: Lepidoptera
- Superfamily: Noctuoidea
- Family: Erebidae
- Subfamily: Arctiinae
- Genus: Autochloris
- Species: A. magnifica

Binomial name
- Autochloris magnifica Rothschild, 1931

Species of moth

Autochloris magnifica is a moth of the subfamily Arctiinae. It was described by Rothschild in 1931. It is found in Bolivia and Peru.

== Subspecies ==
- Autochloris magnifica magnifica (Bolivia)
- Autochloris magnifica reducta Rothschild, 1931 (Bolivia)
- Autochloris magnifica rufipes Rothschild, 1931 (Peru)
