= Adesmus quadricinctus =

Scientific classification
- Kingdom: Animalia
- Phylum: Arthropoda
- Class: Insecta
- Order: Coleoptera
- Suborder: Polyphaga
- Infraorder: Cucujiformia
- Family: Cerambycidae
- Genus: Adesmus
- Species: A. quadricinctus

Binomial name
- Adesmus quadricinctus Galileo & Martins, 1999

Species of beetle

Adesmus quadricinctus is a species of beetle in the family Cerambycidae. It was described by Galileo and Martins in 1999. It is known from Brazil.
