= Autochloris trinitatis =

Scientific classification
- Kingdom: Animalia
- Phylum: Arthropoda
- Clade: Pancrustacea
- Class: Insecta
- Order: Lepidoptera
- Superfamily: Noctuoidea
- Family: Erebidae
- Subfamily: Arctiinae
- Genus: Autochloris
- Species: A. trinitatis

Binomial name
- Autochloris trinitatis Rothschild, 1912

Species of moth

Autochloris trinitatis is a moth of the subfamily Arctiinae. It was described by Rothschild. It is found in Trinidad.

The wingspan is 34 mm. The forewings are dark red-brown with a metallic green point at the base. The hindwings are dark red-brown.
