= Argyroeides tricolor =

Scientific classification
- Kingdom: Animalia
- Phylum: Arthropoda
- Clade: Pancrustacea
- Class: Insecta
- Order: Lepidoptera
- Superfamily: Noctuoidea
- Family: Erebidae
- Subfamily: Arctiinae
- Genus: Argyroeides
- Species: A. tricolor

Binomial name
- Argyroeides tricolor (Packard, 1869)

Synonyms
- Glaucopis tricolor Packard, 1869

Species of moth

Argyroeides tricolor is a moth of the subfamily Arctiinae. It was described by Alpheus Spring Packard in 1869. It is found in the Amazon basin.
