= Argyroeides sanguinea =

Scientific classification
- Domain: Eukaryota
- Kingdom: Animalia
- Phylum: Arthropoda
- Class: Insecta
- Order: Lepidoptera
- Superfamily: Noctuoidea
- Family: Erebidae
- Subfamily: Arctiinae
- Genus: Argyroeides
- Species: A. sanguinea

Binomial name
- Argyroeides sanguinea Schaus, 1896

Species of moth

Argyroeides sanguinea is a moth of the subfamily Arctiinae. It was described by William Schaus in 1896. It is found in the Brazilian states of Paraná and Rio Grande do Sul.
