= Autochloris solimoes =

Scientific classification
- Kingdom: Animalia
- Phylum: Arthropoda
- Clade: Pancrustacea
- Class: Insecta
- Order: Lepidoptera
- Superfamily: Noctuoidea
- Family: Erebidae
- Subfamily: Arctiinae
- Genus: Autochloris
- Species: A. solimoes

Binomial name
- Autochloris solimoes Schaus, 1924

Species of moth

Autochloris solimoes is a moth of the subfamily Arctiinae. It was described by William Schaus in 1924. It is found in Brazil.
