= Argyroeides ceres =

Scientific classification
- Domain: Eukaryota
- Kingdom: Animalia
- Phylum: Arthropoda
- Class: Insecta
- Order: Lepidoptera
- Superfamily: Noctuoidea
- Family: Erebidae
- Subfamily: Arctiinae
- Genus: Argyroeides
- Species: A. ceres

Binomial name
- Argyroeides ceres (H. Druce, 1893)

Synonyms
- Syntrichura ceres H. Druce, 1893

Species of moth

Argyroeides ceres is a moth of the subfamily Arctiinae. It was described by Herbert Druce in 1893. It is found in Guyana.
