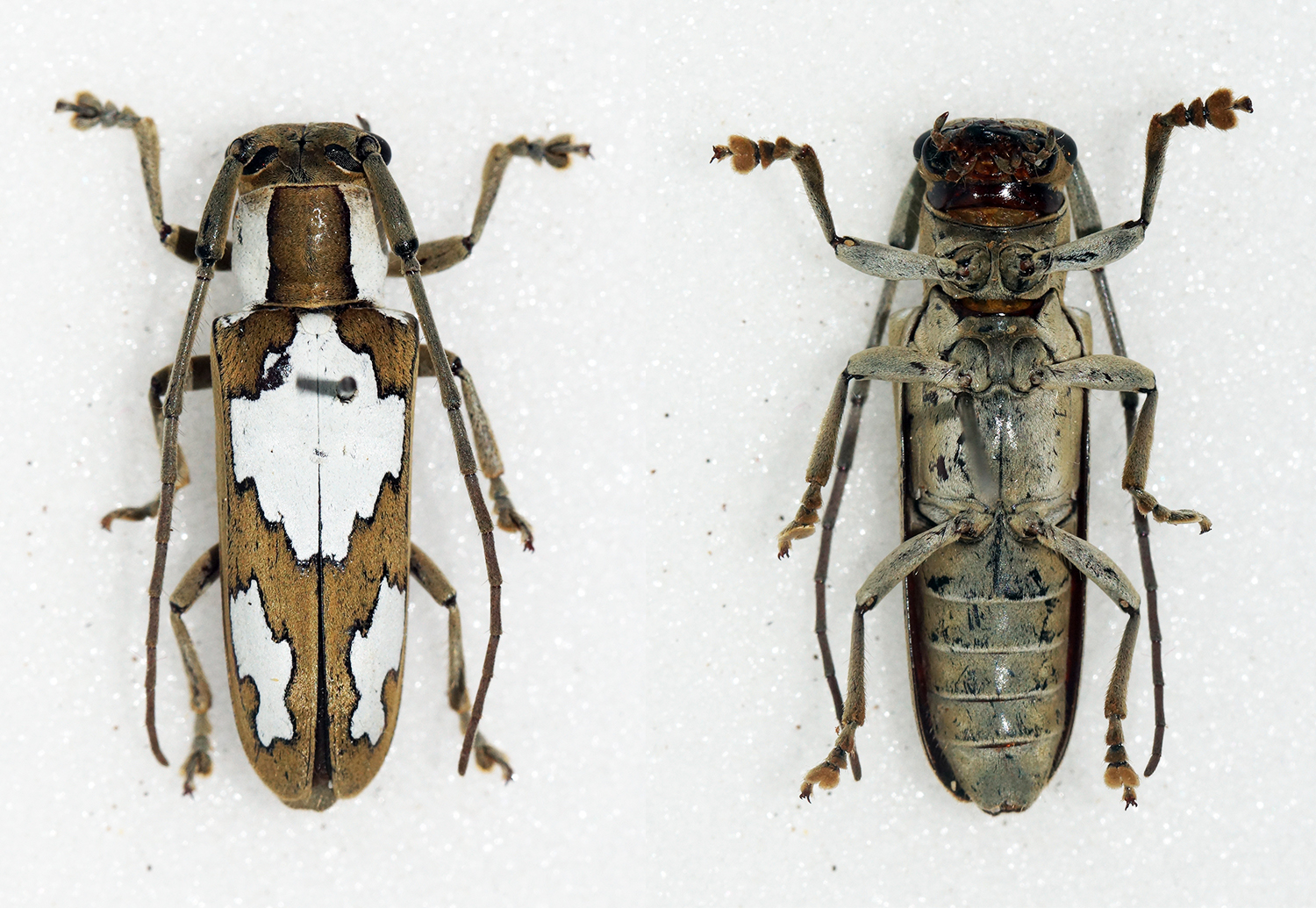
- Adesmus divus, sibling to Adesmus sexlineatus

Scientific classification
- Kingdom: Animalia
- Phylum: Arthropoda
- Clade: Pancrustacea
- Class: Insecta
- Order: Coleoptera
- Suborder: Polyphaga
- Infraorder: Cucujiformia
- Family: Cerambycidae
- Genus: Adesmus
- Species: A. sexlineatus

Binomial name
- Adesmus sexlineatus (Bates, 1881)

Synonyms
- Amphionycha sexlineata Bates, 1881; Hemilophus sexlineatus Lameere, 1883

= Adesmus sexlineatus =

Species of beetle

Adesmus sexlineatus is a species of longhorn beetle in the family Cerambycidae. It was described by Henry Walter Bates in 1881. It is known from Argentina and Brazil.
