= Autochloris laennus =

Scientific classification
- Kingdom: Animalia
- Phylum: Arthropoda
- Clade: Pancrustacea
- Class: Insecta
- Order: Lepidoptera
- Superfamily: Noctuoidea
- Family: Erebidae
- Subfamily: Arctiinae
- Genus: Autochloris
- Species: A. laennus

Binomial name
- Autochloris laennus (Walker, 1854)

Synonyms
- Glaucopis laennus Walker, 1854

Species of moth

Autochloris laennus is a moth of the subfamily Arctiinae. It was described by Francis Walker in 1854. It is found in Brazil.
