= Adesmus seabrai =

Scientific classification
- Kingdom: Animalia
- Phylum: Arthropoda
- Class: Insecta
- Order: Coleoptera
- Suborder: Polyphaga
- Infraorder: Cucujiformia
- Family: Cerambycidae
- Genus: Adesmus
- Species: A. seabrai

Binomial name
- Adesmus seabrai Lane, 1959

Species of beetle

Adesmus seabrai is a species of beetle in the family Cerambycidae. It was described by Lane in 1959. It is known from Brazil.
