= Adesmus monnei =

Scientific classification
- Kingdom: Animalia
- Phylum: Arthropoda
- Class: Insecta
- Order: Coleoptera
- Suborder: Polyphaga
- Infraorder: Cucujiformia
- Family: Cerambycidae
- Genus: Adesmus
- Species: A. monnei

Binomial name
- Adesmus monnei Galileo & Martins, 2009

Species of beetle

Adesmus monnei is a species of beetle in the family Cerambycidae. It was described by Galileo and Martins in 2009. It is known from Brazil.
