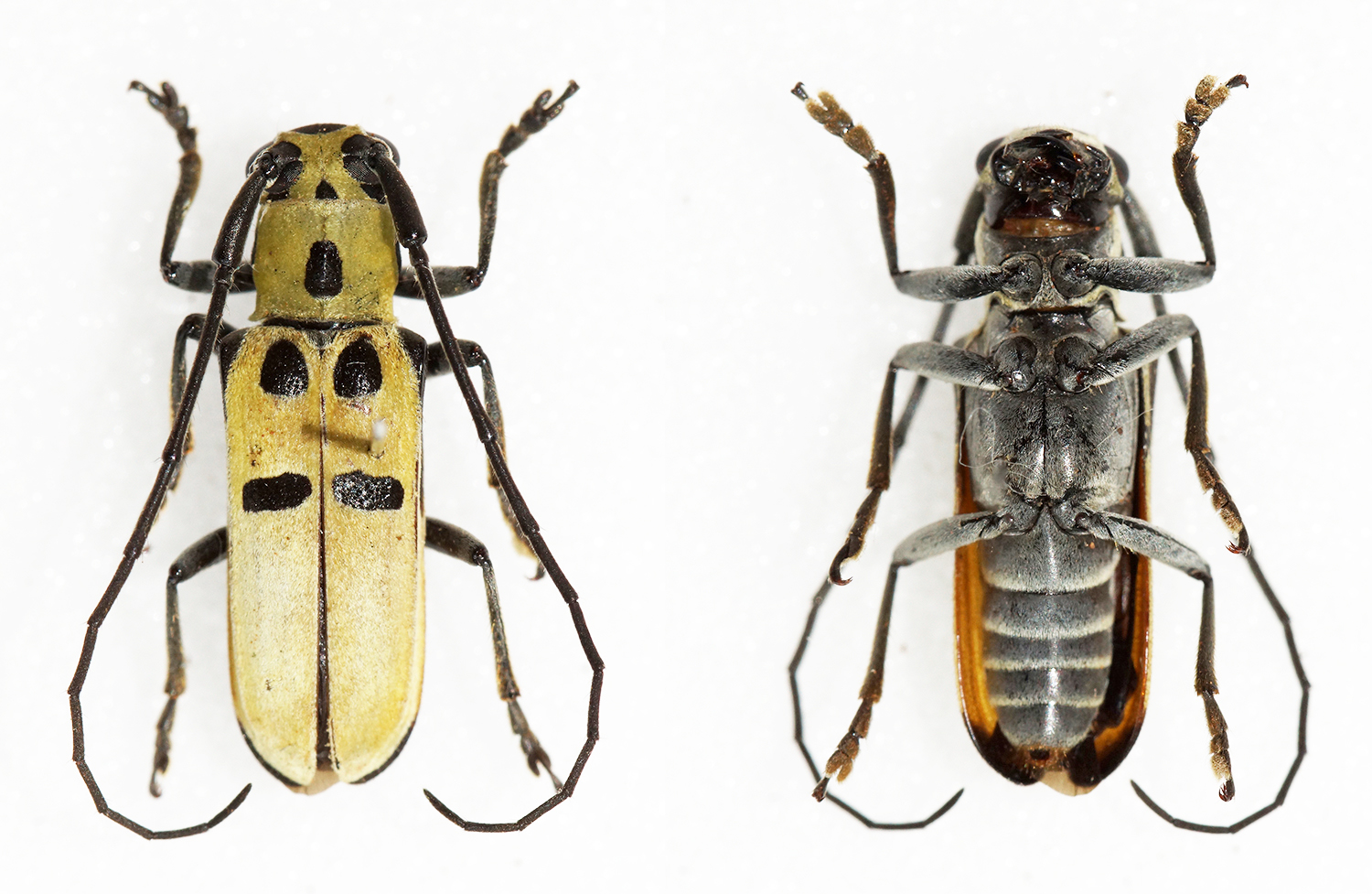

Scientific classification
- Kingdom: Animalia
- Phylum: Arthropoda
- Class: Insecta
- Order: Coleoptera
- Suborder: Polyphaga
- Infraorder: Cucujiformia
- Family: Cerambycidae
- Genus: Adesmus
- Species: A. hemispilus

Binomial name
- Adesmus hemispilus (Germar, 1821)

Synonyms
- Amphionycha hemispila (Germar, 1821); Hemilophus hemispilus (Germar, 1821); Hemilophus luctuosus (Audinet-Serville, 1835); Saperda haemispila Germar, 1821; Saperda luctuosa Audinet-Serville, 1835; Hemilophus hemisphila (Germar, 1821) (misspelling)

= Adesmus hemispilus =

Species of beetle

Adesmus hemispilus is a species of beetle in the family Cerambycidae. It was described by Ernst Friedrich Germar in 1821. It is known from Paraguay, Argentina, and Brazil.
