= Adesmus nigrocinctus =

Scientific classification
- Kingdom: Animalia
- Phylum: Arthropoda
- Class: Insecta
- Order: Coleoptera
- Suborder: Polyphaga
- Infraorder: Cucujiformia
- Family: Cerambycidae
- Genus: Adesmus
- Species: A. nigrocinctus

Binomial name
- Adesmus nigrocinctus (Gahan, 1889)

Synonyms
- Amphionycha nigrocincta Gahan, 1889

Species of beetle

Adesmus nigrocinctus is a species of beetle in the family Cerambycidae. It was described by Gahan in 1889. It is known from Brazil.
