= Argyroeides ophion =

Scientific classification
- Kingdom: Animalia
- Phylum: Arthropoda
- Class: Insecta
- Order: Lepidoptera
- Superfamily: Noctuoidea
- Family: Erebidae
- Subfamily: Arctiinae
- Genus: Argyroeides
- Species: A. ophion

Binomial name
- Argyroeides ophion (Walker, 1854)

Synonyms
- Glaucopis ophion Walker, 1854

Species of moth

Argyroeides ophion is a moth of the subfamily Arctiinae. It was described by Francis Walker in 1854. It is found in Venezuela and Santa Catarina, Brazil.
