= Autochloris flavicosta =

Scientific classification
- Kingdom: Animalia
- Phylum: Arthropoda
- Clade: Pancrustacea
- Class: Insecta
- Order: Lepidoptera
- Superfamily: Noctuoidea
- Family: Erebidae
- Subfamily: Arctiinae
- Genus: Autochloris
- Species: A. flavicosta

Binomial name
- Autochloris flavicosta Rothschild, 1931

Species of moth

Autochloris flavicosta is a moth of the subfamily Arctiinae. It was described by Rothschild in 1931. It is found in Ecuador.
