= Autochloris xanthogastroides =

Scientific classification
- Kingdom: Animalia
- Phylum: Arthropoda
- Clade: Pancrustacea
- Class: Insecta
- Order: Lepidoptera
- Superfamily: Noctuoidea
- Family: Erebidae
- Subfamily: Arctiinae
- Genus: Autochloris
- Species: A. xanthogastroides

Binomial name
- Autochloris xanthogastroides (Schaus, 1901)

Synonyms
- Bombiliodes xanthogastroides Schaus, 1901

Species of moth

Autochloris xanthogastroides is a moth of the subfamily Arctiinae. It was described by William Schaus in 1901. It is found in Brazil.
