= Adesmus hovorei =

Scientific classification
- Kingdom: Animalia
- Phylum: Arthropoda
- Class: Insecta
- Order: Coleoptera
- Suborder: Polyphaga
- Infraorder: Cucujiformia
- Family: Cerambycidae
- Genus: Adesmus
- Species: A. hovorei

Binomial name
- Adesmus hovorei Martins & Galileo, 2004

Species of beetle

Adesmus hovorei is a species of beetle in the family Cerambycidae. It was described by Martins and Galileo in 2004. It is known from Costa Rica and Panama.
