= Autochloris umbratus =

Scientific classification
- Kingdom: Animalia
- Phylum: Arthropoda
- Clade: Pancrustacea
- Class: Insecta
- Order: Lepidoptera
- Superfamily: Noctuoidea
- Family: Erebidae
- Subfamily: Arctiinae
- Genus: Autochloris
- Species: A. umbratus

Binomial name
- Autochloris umbratus Fleming, 1950

Species of moth

Autochloris umbratus is a moth of the subfamily Arctiinae. It was described by Henry Fleming in 1950. It is found in Venezuela.
