= Argyroeides magon =

Scientific classification
- Domain: Eukaryota
- Kingdom: Animalia
- Phylum: Arthropoda
- Class: Insecta
- Order: Lepidoptera
- Superfamily: Noctuoidea
- Family: Erebidae
- Subfamily: Arctiinae
- Genus: Argyroeides
- Species: A. magon

Binomial name
- Argyroeides magon Schaus, 1892

Synonyms
- Argyroeides gyas Druce, 1896

Species of moth

Argyroeides magon is a moth of the subfamily Arctiinae. It was described by William Schaus in 1892. It is found in Santa Catarina, Brazil.
