= Aspergillus flavipes =

Scientific classification
- Kingdom: Fungi
- Division: Ascomycota
- Class: Eurotiomycetes
- Order: Eurotiales
- Family: Aspergillaceae
- Genus: Aspergillus
- Species: A. flavipes

Binomial name
- Aspergillus flavipes (Bainier & Sartory) Thom & Church (1926)

Species of fungus

Aspergillus flavipes is a species of fungus in the genus Aspergillus. It is from the Flavipedes section. The species was first described in 1926. It has been reported to produce sterigmatocystin, citrinin, and lovastatin.

== Growth and morphology ==
A. flavipes has been cultivated on both Czapek yeast extract agar (CYA) plates and Malt Extract Agar Oxoid® (MEAOX) plates. The growth morphology of the colonies can be seen in the pictures below.

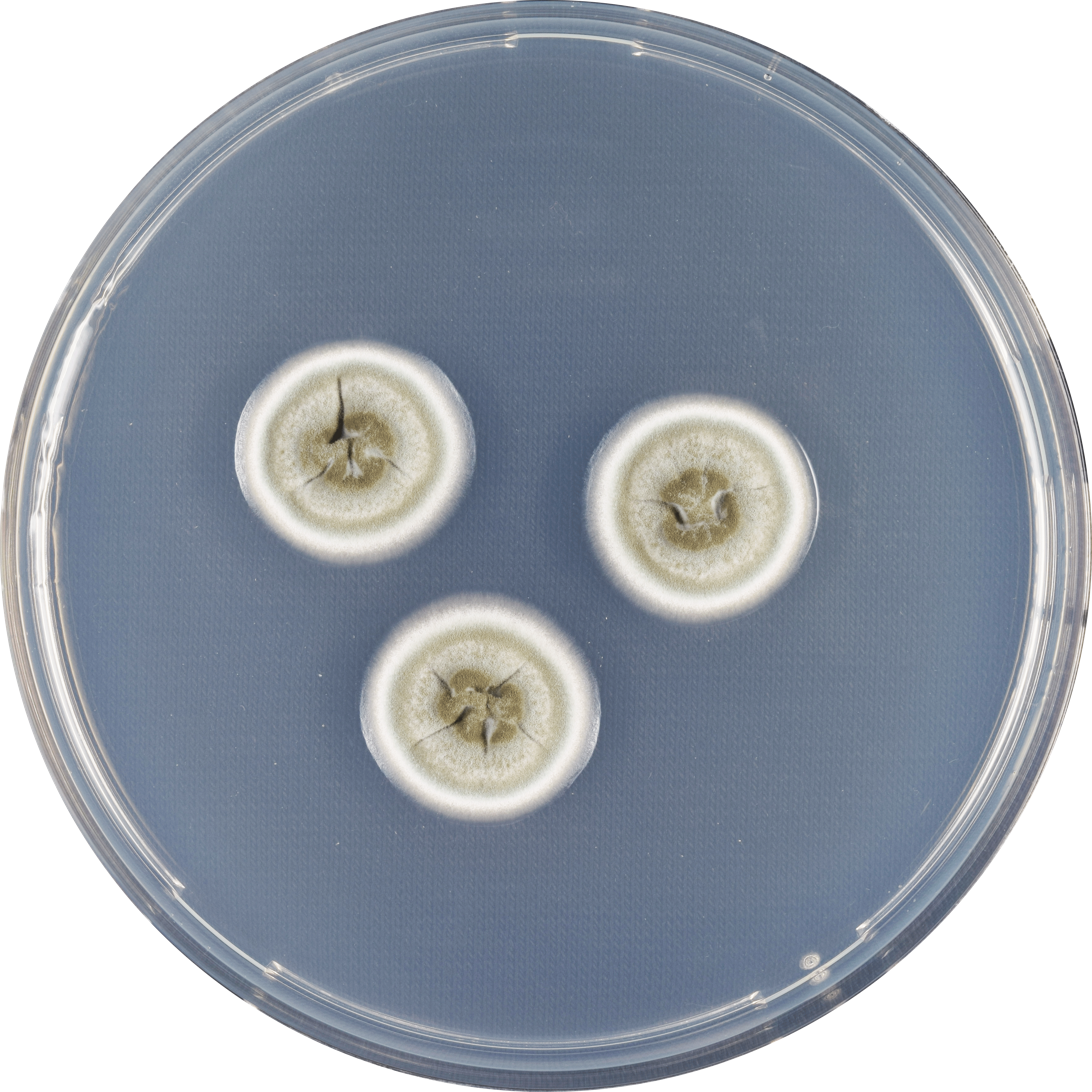
Aspergillus flavipes growing on CYA plate

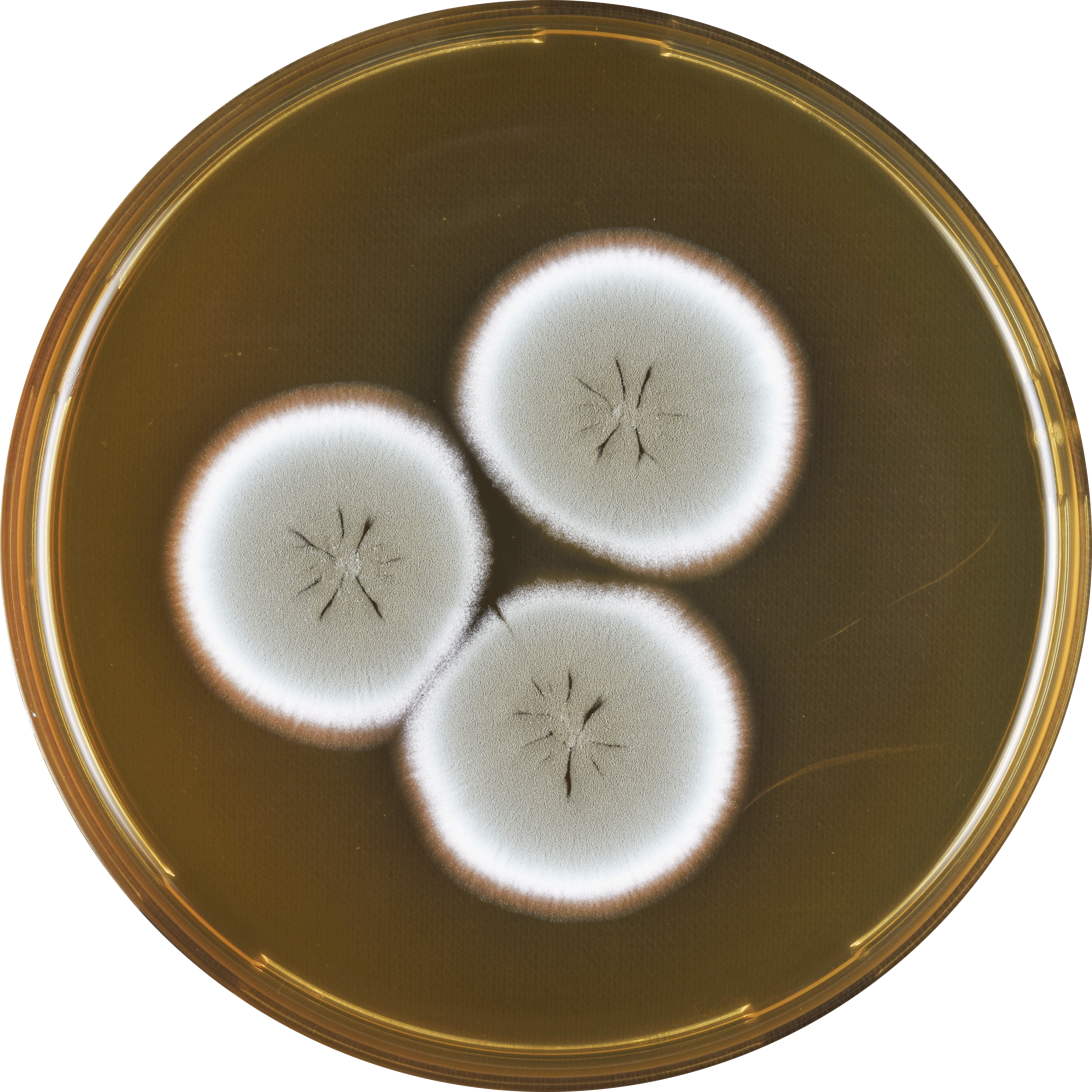
Aspergillus flavipes growing on MEAOX plate
