= Polyacanthia flavipes =

Scientific classification
- Kingdom: Animalia
- Phylum: Arthropoda
- Class: Insecta
- Order: Coleoptera
- Suborder: Polyphaga
- Infraorder: Cucujiformia
- Family: Cerambycidae
- Genus: Polyacanthia
- Species: P. flavipes

Binomial name
- Polyacanthia flavipes (White, 1846)

Synonyms
- Amniscus flavipes (White, 1846); Diastamerus tomentosus Redtenbacher, 1868; Lamia (Amniscus) flavipes White, 1846; Poecilippe flavipes (White, 1846)

Species of beetle

Polyacanthia flavipes is a species of beetle in the family Cerambycidae. It was described by White in 1846, originally under the genus Lamia. It is known from New Zealand.
