= Adesmus clathratus =

- Adesmus clathratus in Embu das Artes, São Paulo

Scientific classification
- Kingdom: Animalia
- Phylum: Arthropoda
- Clade: Pancrustacea
- Class: Insecta
- Order: Coleoptera
- Suborder: Polyphaga
- Infraorder: Cucujiformia
- Family: Cerambycidae
- Genus: Adesmus
- Species: A. clathratus

Binomial name
- Adesmus clathratus (Gistel, 1848)

Synonyms
- Amphionycha clathrata Gistel, 1857; Amphionycha flavipes Lucas, 1859; Amphyonicha clathrata Gistel, 1848

Species of beetle

Adesmus clathratus is a species of beetle in the family Cerambycidae. It was described by Johannes von Nepomuk Franz Xaver Gistel in 1848. It is known from Brazil.
