= Abacetus flavipes =

Scientific classification
- Domain: Eukaryota
- Kingdom: Animalia
- Phylum: Arthropoda
- Class: Insecta
- Order: Coleoptera
- Suborder: Adephaga
- Family: Carabidae
- Genus: Abacetus
- Species: A. flavipes

Binomial name
- Abacetus flavipes C.G.Thomson, 1858

Species of beetle

Abacetus flavipes is a species of ground beetle in the subfamily Pterostichinae. It was described by C.G.Thomson in 1858.
