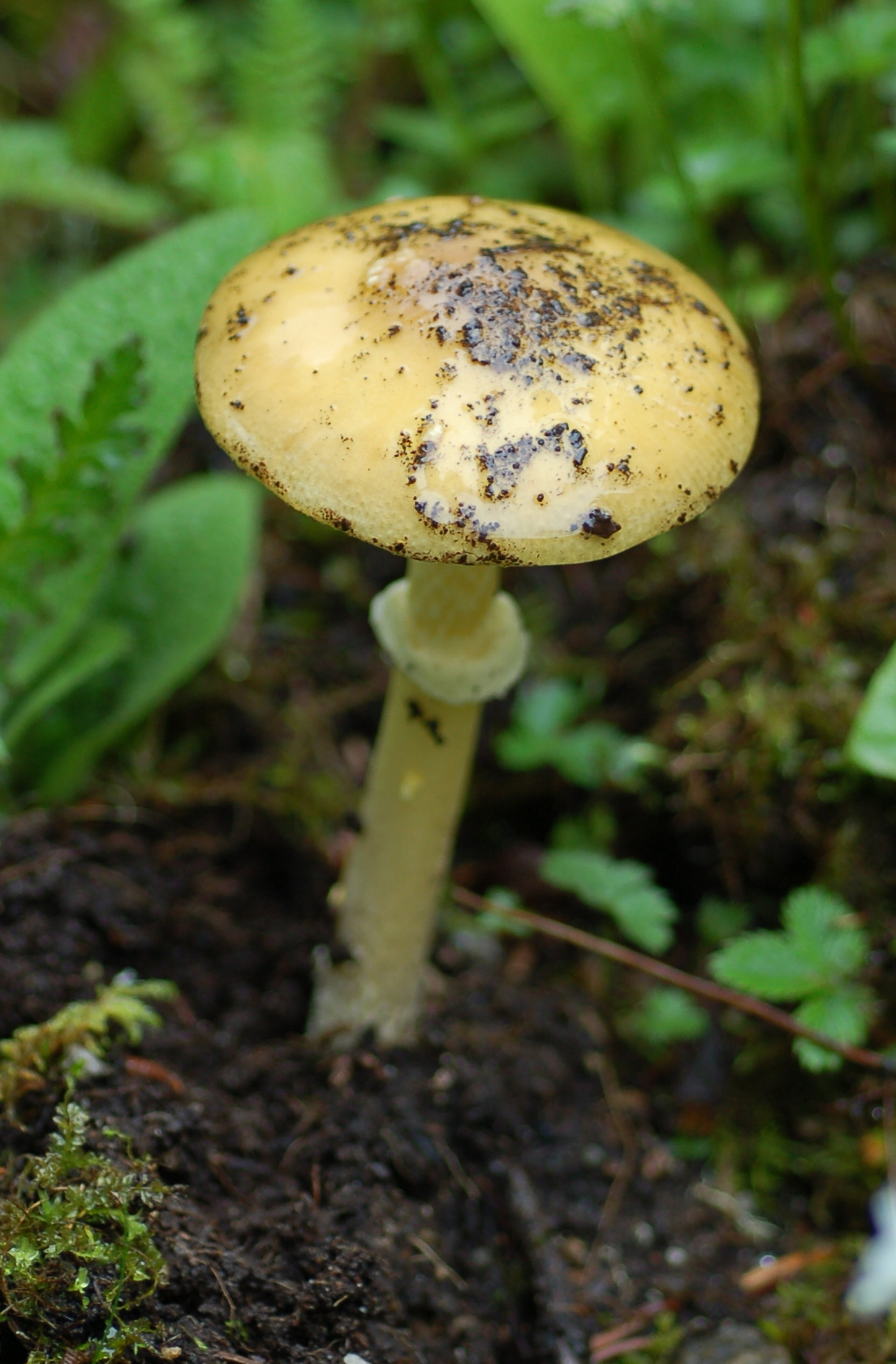

Scientific classification
- Domain: Eukaryota
- Kingdom: Fungi
- Division: Basidiomycota
- Class: Agaricomycetes
- Order: Agaricales
- Family: Amanitaceae
- Genus: Amanita
- Species: A. flavipes

Binomial name
- Amanita flavipes S. Imai 1933

= Amanita flavipes =

Species of fungus

Amanita flavipes is a species of Amanita found in oak and conifer forest of China, India, Japan, Pakistan, and South Korea.
