= 777 =

777 may refer to:

- 777 (number), a number
- AD 777, a year of the Julian calendar
- 777 BC, a year in the 8th century BC
- Boeing 777, a commercial jet airliner

- Boeing 777X, the newer generation of the Boeing 777

== Music ==
- 777 (band), original name of British ambient dance band System 7
- 777 (System 7 album), 1993
- 777 (Key! and Kenny Beats album), 2018
- 777 (Latto album), 2022
- 777 – Cosmosophy, 2012 album by French black metal band Blut Aus Nord
- 777 – Sect(s), 2011 album by Blut Aus Nord
- 777 – The Desanctification, 2011 album by Blut Aus Nord
- 777 (video), by Underoath, 2007
- Triple Seven (album), 2024 album by Wishy
- 777: Triple Seven, 2012 album by Japanese band AAA
- Danzig 777: I Luciferi, 2002 album by Danzig
- "777 (We Can Sing a Song!)", 2012 song by Japanese pop group AAA
- 777, 2010 album by Tonetta
- 777, working title for the 2019 Jason Derulo EP 2Sides (Side 1)
- "777", a track on LP5 by Autechre
- "777", a track on Danzig II: Lucifuge by Danzig
- "777", a track on An Evening with Silk Sonic by Silk Sonic
- "777", a track on Nectar by Joji

== Other uses ==
- 777 (cycling team), a Belgian cyclo-cross team
- 777 and Other Qabalistic Writings of Aleister Crowley, a collection of papers written by Aleister Crowley
- 777 Partners, United States private equity company
- British Rail Class 777, a train class of the Merseyrail network
- Caterpillar 777, an 80 tonne (100 st) rigid-frame off-road haul truck
- M777 howitzer, a towed artillery piece used by Australia, Canada, India, Saudi Arabia and the United States
- Minuscule 777, a Greek minuscule manuscript of the New Testament
- Portvein 777, a Russian brand of fortified wine
- Unit 777, an Egyptian Special Forces unit
- Full access file system permissions in Unix syntax
- Triple Seven, a winning line in slot machines
- "Triple 7", the train designation of "The Beast" in the 2010 film Unstoppable
- Triskelion symbol of the Afrikaner Weerstandsbeweging
- Derisive nickname for Carrie Lam, the fourth chief executive of Hong Kong elected with 777 votes

== See also ==
- List of highways numbered 777
- 77 (disambiguation)
- 7 (disambiguation)
