= Ultima Thule =

Ultima Thule primarily refers to:

- Thule, a Latin (and earlier Greek) name for an island north of Britain
- 486958 Arrokoth, a distant minor planet previously nicknamed "Ultima Thule"

Ultima Thule may also refer to:

== Music ==
- Ultima Thule (Swedish band)
- Ultima Thule (Estonian band)
- Ultima Thule Ambient Music, an Australian radio show
- Ultima Thule, an album by Polish band Armia
- Ultima Thulée, an album by French band Blut Aus Nord
- Ultima Thule, an album by British band Ostara
- Ultima Thule, an album by Finnish band UMO Jazz Orchestra
- "Ultima Thule", a single by German band Tangerine Dream, included in reissues of their Alpha Centauri album
- L'ultima Thule, an album by Italian singer Francesco Guccini
- Ultima Thule Rap song by Russian rapper Oxxxymiron feat Luperkal

== Literature ==
- Ultima Thule, a poetry collection by Henry Wadsworth Longfellow
- Ultima Thule, a volume of the novel The Fortunes of Richard Mahony by Henry Handel Richardson
- "Ultima Thule", a science-fiction short story by Mack Reynolds
- "Ultima Thule", a short story by Vladimir Nabokov
- "Ultima Thule", a short story by Stefan Grabiński

== Other uses ==
- Ultima Thule, a 2002 film by Janie Geiser
- Ultima Thule, a 2023 film by Polish writer and director Klaudiusz Chrostowsk, starring Jakub Gierszał
- Ultima Thule Creek (UT Creek) a small natural watercourse near the town of Alexandra, Victoria, Australia
- Ultima Thule Peak, a mountain in Alaska
- Ultima Thule, Arkansas, an historical trading post and intended destination for the Ultima Thule, Arkadelphia, and Mississippi Railway
- Ultima Thule, a set of glassware designed by Tapio Wirkkala for Iittala
- Ultima Thule, a key location in Final Fantasy XIV: Endwalker described as the edge of creation
- Ultima Thule, an ice world encountered in an episode of Space: 1999 titled "Death's Other Dominion" (S01 E05 PC14)
- Ultima Thule, the ship which serves as the starting point for characters in Omens of the Deep, an expansion for the game Elder Sign.

== See also ==
- Thule (disambiguation)
- Ultima (disambiguation)
