= Ultima =

Ultima may refer to:

== Games ==
- Ultima (series), a series of video games
  - Ultima I, which was first released as Ultima
- Ultima (Freedom City), characters in Freedom City
- Baroque chess, known in the northeastern region of the United States as "Ultima"

== Places ==
- Ultima, Victoria, a town in Australia
- Pangaea Ultima, a supercontinent to occur in the future
- Ultima, the larger lobe of the trans-Neptunian object 486958 Arrokoth, nicknamed Ultima Thule

== Companies and products ==
- Ultima Genomics, an American genome sequencing technology company
- Ultima Foods, a division of Quebec-based dairy company Agropur
- Ultima Sports Ltd, a manufacturer of sports cars based in England
- Junkers Profly Ultima, a German homebuilt aircraft design
- Kodak Ultima, a brand of photo paper for inkjet printers sold by Eastman Kodak
- Kyosho Ultima, a radio-controlled car made by Kyosho

== Music ==
- Ultima Oslo Contemporary Music Festival
- Ultima Thulée, the first full-length studio album by black metal band Blut Aus Nord
- La Ultima / Live in Berlin (2005 album) German rock album by Böhse Onkelz
- "Última (song)", a song by Shakira from the album Las Mujeres Ya No Lloran, 2024

== Other uses ==
- Ultima (linguistics), the last syllable of a word
- Ultima (finance), a variable in quantitative finance
- Bless Me, Ultima, a 1972 novel by Rudolfo Anaya with a character called Ultima
- Ultima Tower, a hypothetical supertall skyscraper
- Ultima (comics), a fictional character in Marvel comics

== See also ==
- Ultima Thule (disambiguation)
- Ultimo (disambiguation), a similar term
- Ultimate (disambiguation)
