= Ultimate =

Ultimate or Ultimates may refer to:

== Arts, entertainment, and media ==
=== Music ===
==== Albums ====
- Ultimate (Bryan Adams album)
- Ultimate (Jolin Tsai album)
- Ultimate (Pet Shop Boys album)
- Ultimate!, an album by The Yardbirds
- Ultimate Prince or just Ultimate, an album by Prince

==== Songs ====
- "Ultimate" (Denzel Curry song), 2015
- "Ultimate" (Lindsay Lohan song), from the Freaky Friday soundtrack

=== Video games ===
- Super Smash Bros. Ultimate, a 2018 Nintendo Switch platform fighting game
- Ultimate General, a series of computer games recreating the American Civil War
- Ultimate Play the Game or just Ultimate, a video game developer, now known as Rare

=== Other uses in arts, entertainment, and media ===
- Ultimate (roller coaster), at Lightwater Valley amusement park near Ripon, North Yorkshire, England
- Ultimates, a fictional superhero group in the Marvel Comics universe

== Sport ==
- Ultimate (sport), a flying-disc team sport

== Technology ==
- Ultimate 10-200, a Canadian aerobatic biplane design
- Windows 7 Ultimate, a marketing edition of Windows 7
- Windows Vista Ultimate, a marketing edition of Windows Vista

== See also ==
- The Ultimate (disambiguation)
- The Ultimate Collection (disambiguation)
- Ultima (disambiguation)
- Ultimo (disambiguation)
