= The Ultimate =

The Ultimate may refer to:

- The Ultimate (Animorphs), a book by K. A. Applegate in the Animorphs series
- The Ultimate (Elvin Jones album), 1968
- The Ultimate (Grace Jones album), 1993
- The Ultimate (Jo Stafford album)
- The Ultimate (roller coaster), a steel roller coaster at Lightwater Valley amusement park, England
- The Absolute (philosophy), sometimes called the Ultimate, the concept of an unconditional reality which transcends limited, conditional, everyday existence

== The Ultimates ==
- Ultimates, a superhero group
- The Ultimates (comic book), a 2002 comic
  - Ultimate Comics: The Ultimates
- Ultimates (2015), a 2015 comic
- The Ultimates (2024), a 2024 comic

== See also ==
- Ultimate (disambiguation)
