= Thule (disambiguation) =

Thule was, in ancient Greek and Roman literature and cartography, a semi-mythical place located in the far north, usually an island.

Thule may also refer to:

== People ==
- Thule people, ancestors of the Inuit

== Places ==
- New Thule, former name of the town of Qaanaaq, Greenland
- Thule or Old Thule, a locality in North Star Bay, Greenland, site of Thule Trading Station from 1910
- Thule Island, in the South Sandwich Islands
- Thule Islands, a group of Antarctic islands
- Mount Thule, Canada
- 279 Thule, an asteroid
- Thule, the smaller lobe of the trans-Neptunian object 486958 Arrokoth, nicknamed Ultima Thule at the time of the New Horizons flyby

=== Fictional locations ===
- Thule, a fictional version of Greenland in the Kinderen van Moeder Aarde novels by Dutch writer Thea Beckman

== Companies and organizations ==
- Thule Group, a Sweden-based company which designs and manufactures outdoor and cargo products
- Thule Society, a German occultist group and forerunner of the Nazi Party
- White Order of Thule, an American white supremacist group

== Military ==
- Pituffik Space Base, formerly known as Thule Air Base, a United States military base on Greenland
- Radio Mast Thule, a communications tower in Greenland
- HSwMS Thule, a Swedish navy ship name
- HMS Thule, a British navy ship name

== Other uses ==
- Graphium thule, a species of butterfly

== See also ==
- 1968 Thule Air Base B-52 crash
- Thulegate, a political scandal involving nuclear weapons
- Ultima Thule (disambiguation)
- Thyle, a court position
- Taake, a black metal band from Norway formerly known as Thule.
