= Memoria Vetusta II – Dialogue with the Stars =

Studio album by Blut Aus Nord
- Released: February 23, 2009
- Genre: Atmospheric black metal, melodic black metal
- Length: 59:56
- Label: Candlelight Records (CANDLE141CD)

Blut Aus Nord chronology
Odinist: The Destruction of Reason by Illumination (2007)	Memoria Vetusta II – Dialogue with the Stars (2009)	777 – Sect(s) (2011)

Memoria Vetusta II – Dialogue with the Stars is the seventh album by French avant-garde black metal band Blut Aus Nord. The album demonstrates more traditional black metal songwriting and structure than previous album MoRT, with critics noting that stylistically this album represents a balance between the band's more experimental work and the band's earlier, more traditional black metal releases.

== Critical reception ==
Professional ratings
Review scores
Source	Rating
AllMusic	4/5 stars
Metal Injection	Very positive
MetalSucks	4.5/5 stars
PopMatters	8/10

The album was received very positively by critics. Writing for AllMusic, Alex Henderson gave the album 4/5. He described it as "melodic in a dark, brooding, atmospheric way", concluding that "This isn't happy, escapist music; the material is full of gloom and pessimism, but it is well-crafted and nicely executed. Detractors can claim that Dialogue with the Stars is "too artsy" all they want; the bottom line is that from a creative standpoint, Blut Aus Nord get to have the last laugh."

Stereogum's Brandon Stosuy named the album as the 8th best metal album of 2009, writing that "Memoria Vetusta II does what it promises, creating an hour’s worth of sky-shooting epics (fluid guitar solos, repeating motifs, etc.) that move from fragile and meditative to blistering in a heartbeat and really do feel like they’re talking to the constellations. Endless boogie, for sure."

== Track listing ==
No.	Title	Length
1.	"Acceptance (Aske)"	1:30
2.	"Disciple's Libration (Lost in the Nine Worlds)"	9:06
3.	"The Cosmic Echoes of Non-Matter (Immaterial Voices of the Fathers)"	6:29
4.	"Translucent Body of Air (Sutta Anapanasati)"	2:24
5.	"Antithesis of the Flesh (...And Then Arises a New Essence)"	7:53
6.	"...the Meditant (Dialogue With the Stars)"	10:14
7.	"The Alcove of Angels (Vispassana)"	8:43
8.	"The Formless Sphere (Beyond the Reason)"	9:27
9.	"Elevation"	4:10

== Personnel ==
- Vindsval - vocals, electric guitar
- GhÖst - bass guitar
- W.D. Feld - keyboards, drums, percussion

Additional Personnel

- David Cragné - artwork
