= Memoria Vetusta III: Saturnian Poetry =

Studio album by Blut Aus Nord
- Released: October 10, 2014
- Genre: Atmospheric black metal
- Length: 48:41
- Label: Debemur Morti Productions (DMP0115)

Blut Aus Nord chronology
777 – Cosmosophy (2012)	Memoria Vetusta III: Saturnian Poetry (2014)	Deus Salutis Meæ (2017)

Memoria Vetusta III - Saturnian Poetry is the eleventh studio album by French black metal band Blut Aus Nord. It was released on October 10, 2014, through Debemur Morti Productions. This is the third and last album of the 'Memoria Vetusta' trilogy. The album cover was painted by Kristian "Necrolord" Wåhlin, famous for his work with black metal bands such as Emperor, Dissection, and Bathory, and the layout was provided by Dehn Sora. It is also the first full-length album by Blut Aus Nord to feature Thorns (Gionata Potenti) on drums. In addition to positive reviews by critics, the album was also listed by Rolling Stone as the 13th best metal album of 2014.

== Critical reception ==
Professional ratings
Review scores
Source	Rating
AllMusic	4/5 stars
Metal Hammer	3.5/5 stars
Pitchfork	8.2/10
Sputnik Music	3.8/5

The album has been well received by critics. AllMusic's Thom Jurek gave it 4/5 and wrote that "Memoria Vetusta III: Saturnian Poetry is not only a worthy extension in this series, but perhaps the finest volume in it. It proves just how much creative life is left in the core approach of black metal. That said, it may be that it takes a visionary act like Blut Aus Nord to bring it out."

Pitchfork's Andy O'Connor likewise praised the album, noting in particular the contribution of drummer Thorns, writing that "he delivers a more than capable performance", and that "Poetry wouldn’t have made sense with Vindsval’s electronic drum programming from the 777 series—those records were more industrial, whereas this record is more recognizably black metal, and a cold, mechanical drum machine wouldn't work. There needed to be something with some blood behind it here, something more "natural." He needed a human touch, even if his music is otherworldly."

Writing for MetalSucks, Kim Kelly named it her album of the year for 2014, adding that "Vindsval’s return and conclusion of the Memoria Vetusta trilogy couldn’t have come at a better time, and serves as a master class in crafting icy, bombastic melodic black metal. You need this in your life… trust me." Spin also named it as the 3rd best metal album of 2014, writing that "Its seven songs take the listener on a glistening odyssey up to the absolute pinnacle of epic, melodic black metal and leaves you there, breathless, wondering where it will take you next."

== Track listing ==
Track listing adapted from AllMusic.

No.	Title	Length
1.	"Prelude"	1:22
2.	"Paien"	7:55
3.	"Tellus Mater"	6:18
4.	"Forhist"	8:56
5.	"Henosis"	7:28
6.	"Metaphor of the Moon"	8:11
7.	"Clarissima Mundi Lumina"	8:31

== Personnel ==
Blut Aus Nord

- Vindsval – vocals, guitar
- Thorns – drums

Additional

- Kristian "Necrolord" Wåhlin – artwork
- DehnSora – layout
- Christophe Szpajdel – logo
