= Ævangelist =

US musical group

- Origin: Arlington Heights, Illinois, U.S. Portland, Oregon, U.S.
- Genres: Death metal; black metal; avant-garde metal
- Years active: 2010–present
- Labels: I, Voidhanger; Debemur Morti; 20 Buck Spin
- Members: Ascaris; Matron Thorn
- Website: newobliviongospelmusic.com

Ævangelist are an American death metal/black metal band that integrates avant-garde and experimental elements into their music. The band is primarily composed of Ascaris and Matron Thorn, though additional musicians take on drum and guitar duties for live performances. The band was formed in 2010 by Ascaris and Matron Thorn and they have released four full-length albums and five EPs to date.

== History ==
The band was formed in 2010 when, after touring together in different bands, Matron Thorn approached Ascaris about forming a project together. Thorn described that "There was a certain chemistry onstage that suggested something more to our encounter, creatively." They deliberately sought to create a sound that was very distinct from the projects they had previously worked on, and "at the heart of Ævangelist, we have always sought to provide an honest reflection of human existence through our mirrors to the other side. Terror and misery were simply the result of our formula."

They released their first EP Oracle of Infinite Despair independently in 2011, and Thorn claims the album was distributed "only among close friends, as well as a small network of our friends and colleagues." Luciano Gaglio of I, Void Hanger Records became aware of the EP and approached the band about working together, and the band released their first full-length album 'De Masticatione Mortuorum in Tumulis' on his record label on October 16, 2012, which also featured the three songs from their first EP. The album was received well, with Kim Kelly naming it the 15th best metal album of 2012 in her column for MetalSucks. She described the album as "an unnerving cluster of warped black, death, doom, psychotic wails, dead choirs, creepy samples, and generally fucked-up sounds that is genuinely frightening at times."

The band released their second full-length album Omen Ex Simulcra on November 29, 2013, this time through Debemur Morti Productions. The album garnered critical acclaim, receiving positive reviews by Pitchfork, Metal Injection, Invisible Oranges, CVLT Nation, and others. In her review for Pitchfork, Kelly wrote that Ævangelist "create an aural monster, a horrific re-imagining of black/death metal coupled with harsh electronic noise and industrial mechanization."

On January 25, 2014 the band performed at the Saint Vitus bar in Brooklyn, New York along with Oak, Artificial Brain, and Disparish. Reviewing the show for Invisible Oranges, Doug Moore described the band's performance: "Every member wears tribal-ish makeup; vocalist Ascaris sports a mask and is prone to rolling around on the floor; instrumental main man Matron Thorn plays a hollow-bodied jazz guitar instead of the standard pointy-framed Jackson or BC Rich. Most importantly, the band doesn't have a live drummer. They rely on a drum machine instead — always a dicey proposition for a death metal band."

They released their third full-length album Writhes in the Murk on September 12, 2014, again to critical acclaim. Noisey premiered the track 'The Only Grave' in advance of the album's release, adding "Taking pages from bands like Incantation, Portal and others, Ævangelist use death metal as their primary vehicle to launch their nightmare, but dip into dark ambient, black metal and power electronics to seal in even more horror." No Clean Singing also premiered the track 'Præternigma' in advance of the album's release, describing the music as "dense and enveloping, with writhing, grinding riffs generating a moving mass of ominous sound." The album was received positively by Metal Injection, Echoes and Dust, Invisible Oranges, CVLT Nation, and others. Steel for Brains highlighted the album, writing that "Thankfully Ævangelist make more than good on the promise indicated by the album's title. This music is parasitic in every good way, burrowing into every dark corner of each composition until the light has nowhere to escape."

They released the experimental EP/album Dream an Evil Dream on September 16, 2015, consisting of a single 38-minute, largely improvised song. They followed this with the release of their fourth full-length studio album Enthrall to the Void of Bliss on October 9 that same year, this time through the record label 20 Buck Spin. Prior to the album's release, No Clean Singing premiered the song 'Levitating Stones', writing that "Based on this first offering, I'm also guessing that the album will be one of 2015's true highlights." The album received very positive reviews by About.com, CVLT Nation, Consequence of Sound, Echoes and Dust, and others. MetalSucks wrote that "Fans of dark and messy death metal will fall (mostly) in love with Enthrall to the Void of Bliss."

In October 2015 the band performed at the California Deathfest festival that took place in Oakland, California. Reviewing the festival for No Clean Singing, Islander wrote that "At some point afterward, I told a new acquaintance that, for me, the mark of the finest performances at a live show is when the music is so all-consuming that I forget where I am, that I get so lost in what I'm seeing and hearing that every other thought is blown out of my head. I saw lots of fine bands at this festival, but there weren't many who had that effect on me. Ævangelist were one."

In April 2016, it was confirmed that the band would release a split EP with the French avant-garde black metal band Blut Aus Nord. The EP, titled Codex Obscura Nomina, was released on June 17, 2016 through Debemur Morti Productions.

A version of the band was created by Matron Thorn in late 2018 after the status of the original lineup became disputed. Matron Thorn claims that this iteration is the true version of the band, while the vocalist of the previous iteration, Ascaris, claims that the band is now split up.

== Musical style and influences ==
The band primarily play a mixture of black metal and death metal but with many experimental and avant-garde elements. Many critics have noted the emphasis the band place on creating a terrifying, nightmarish atmosphere, as well as the use of unconventional instruments such as saxophones, violins, and cellos. In her review of 'Omen Ex Simulcra' music critic Kim Kelly wrote that " the listener is confronted by claustrophobia, fear, and naked aggression."

Speaking to New Noise Magazine, Matron Thorn explained that "The music and lyrics combine to transmit the dark frequency of the esoteric, which is heard by every person who decides to listen. Nothing is necessary to channel the muse that endows the art, for it is something which defies rational explanation, yet we carry with us always." The band also attempt to subvert the listener's expectations of what the band's image ought to be, both in terms of broader gender norms as well as what corpse paint should look like, as well as what instruments are and are not acceptable. When asked about why the band play with the issue of gender roles and norms in their live shows, vocalist Ascaris said the following:

And those are things that are terrifying to people because those are real things and those are the things that touch people. They extend to the different facets of who you are as a person. They affect things that you didn't know could be affected. There are people who put on costumes and perform musical shows. Some people are moved by it and some people aren't. There are people that put on makeup. Some people are moved by it and some people aren't. ... We are presenting ourselves as we are. The fact that it is scary to people and the fact that it is vulgar and offensive and profane to people is exactly as it should be because that is largely what reality is. Our representation of what we do with this void, as you put it, is no more than just a very intimate reflection of reality itself. It's us just doing what we do, just being ourselves.

— Invisible Oranges

== Band members ==
=== Current ===
==== Ævangelist ====
- Ascaris – vocals, saxophone, cello
- Matron Thorn – guitars, bass, drums, vocals, noise

==== Live musicians ====
- Æryn – guitars (2014–present)
- Sælith – drums (2014–present)
- Rænym - bass (2016–present)

=== Former ===
==== Live musicians ====
- ][ – bass, vocals (2013–2015)
- Auditor – effects, ambience, atmosphere, noise (2014–2015)
- C. Hogan – vocals (2014)

== Discography ==
=== Studio albums ===
- De Masticatione Mortuorum in Tumulis (2012)
- Omen Ex Simulcra (2013)
- Writhes in the Murk (2014)
- Enthrall to the Void of Bliss (2015)
- Heralds of Nightmare Descending (2018)
- Matricide in the Temple of Omega (2018)
- Dream an Evil Dream II (2020)
- Nightmarecatcher (2020)
- Dream an Evil Dream III (2021)

=== EPs ===
- Oracle of Infinite Despair (2011)
- Nightmare Flesh Offering (2013)
- To the Dream Plateau of Hideous Revelation (2013) – split with Esoterica
- Abstract Catharsis (2015)
- Dream an Evil Dream (2015)
- Codex Obscura Nomina (2016) – split with Blut Aus Nord
- Aberrant Genesis (2018)

=== Live albums ===
- Live at California Deathfest (2015)

=== Compilations ===
- Veneration of Profane Antiquity (2018)
