= ULT =

ULT may refer to:

- the Latin abbreviation ult., previously used especially in business correspondence for ultimo mense, (last month)
- Sauer S 2100 ULT, a turbocharged four-stroke aircraft engine for homebuilt and ultralight aircraft
- Ultra low temperature
  - ULT freezer, an ultra low temperature freezer
- United Learning Trust, a UK educational charity
- United Lodge of Theosophists
- "ULT", a song by Denzel Curry from the 2016 album Imperial
- ULT-160, a front loader that was produced Serbian heavy machinery manufacturer 14. oktobar from 1985
- Ult Tagdyry, a Kazakh nationalist political movement
- Tunisia Private University (Université Libre de Tunis, ULT)

== See also ==
- Ultimo (disambiguation)
- Ultra (disambiguation)
- UTL (disambiguation)
