= Ultimo =

Ultimo may refer to:

- Ultimo, New South Wales
- Ulten, comune in Italy, Italian name Ultimo
- Ultimo (Marvel Comics), comic books character
- Ultimo (brand), Scottish designer lingerie brand
- Ultimo (manga), a manga series written by Stan Lee and illustrated by Hiroyuki Takei
- Ultimo (singer), Italian singer
- ult. or ultimo., a Latin abbreviation, previously used especially in business correspondence for ultimo mense ("last month")

== See also ==
- Ultima (disambiguation)
- Ultimate (disambiguation)
- ULT (disambiguation)
