= UTL =

UTL may refer to:

- Technical University of Lisbon
- University of Toronto Libraries
- Union Territory of Lakshadweep
- Uganda Telecom Limited

== See also ==
- ULT (disambiguation)
