= Raptor Attack =

Enclosed steel roller coaster in the UK

- Previously known as Sewer Rat and Rat Ride
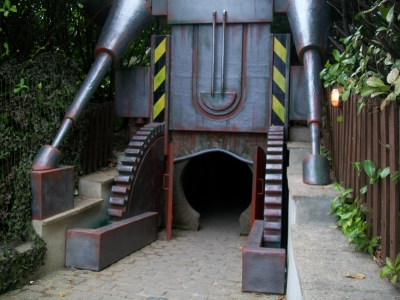
- Mineshaft and ride entrance

Lightwater Valley
- Location: Lightwater Valley
- Coordinates: 54.1739°N 1.5687°W
- Status: Removed
- Opening date: 2 April 1987 (as Rat Ride); 4 April 2010 (as Raptor Attack)

General statistics
- Type: Steel – Enclosed
- Manufacturer: Anton Schwarzkopf
- Designer: Werner Stengel
- Model: Wildcat (45m)
- Lift/launch system: Chain lift hill
- Height: 50 ft (15 m)
- Drop: 35 ft (11 m)
- Length: 1,837 ft (560 m)
- Speed: 40 mph (64 km/h)
- Inversions: 0
- Duration: 1:25
- Height restriction: 120 cm (3 ft 11 in)
- Trains: a single car. Riders are arranged 2 across in 2 rows for a total of 4 riders per train.
- Raptor Attack at RCDB

Raptor Attack was an enclosed steel roller coaster at the Lightwater Valley theme park in North Yorkshire, United Kingdom.

== History ==
In 1987, Lightwater Valley constructed an Anton Schwarzkopf Wildcat roller coaster. The ride was constructed inside a warehouse-type building hidden by trees and embankments and the base of a former quarry. This gave the illusion that the ride is actually underground. At opening, it was known as Rat Ride and themed around sewer rats. The entry and exit corridors effectively replicated a real sewer, with the ride vehicles' chassis being adorned with giant rat models. The ride took place in complete darkness, preventing riders from predicting the upcoming direction of travel.

Rat Ride closed in October 2009. On 4 April 2010, it reopened as Raptor Attack, with a theme of escaped velociraptors. It was closed and removed from the park in 2020. The coaster was relocated to COTALAND in Austin, Texas, United States, where it reopened in 2021.

== Ride experience ==
The final incarnation of the ride saw it themed on an old abandoned mine shaft, with riders queuing at the entry point. Upon entry, riders walked through a series of tunnels and descended a spiralling staircase between which water fell from overhead.

An abandoned office featured blood-spattered equipment including a monitor which saw footage of a distressed miner. This footage originally had sound, with the miner calling out a warning that there was something moving down there, and not to send anyone else down the mine. The sound was removed partway through the season, as younger children thought the footage was real and became distressed.

Riders continued onto the boarding station where four-seater mine trains awaited. Ride operators dressed in themed miner clothing with hard hats and fluorescent jackets.

The train left the station into an area of total darkness and ascended a chain-driven climb. A series of drops followed, interlinked between sudden appearances of animatronic velociraptors and sound effects designed to startle the riders. The roller coaster system and layout remained the same as the original 'Rat Ride', but the appearances of the dinosaurs and the ride's revamped theming added new elements to the experience.

When the car returned to the station and riders disembark (after a dramatic braking stop), they passed a steel door from behind which something suddenly banged very loudly. This was another feature designed to startle departing riders, and was activated via motion sensor.

Riders then continued on through the tunnels, passing a hydraulic piston in a pool of water and human bones. The piston suddenly discharged a blast of air from beneath the water, creating a loud noise and splash designed to startle the exiting riders. A staircase was then ascended, another tunnel passed during which sound effects of dinosaur roared and groans played before the surface was reached. In this final part of the exit corridors, an actress occasionally featured during the Halloween Frightwater Valley-themed events.

In the immediate area outside the ride exit was the raptor paintball range and riders left via a merchandise shop which also sold on-ride photographs.
