= Eagle's Claw (Lightwater Valley) =

Amusement ride in England

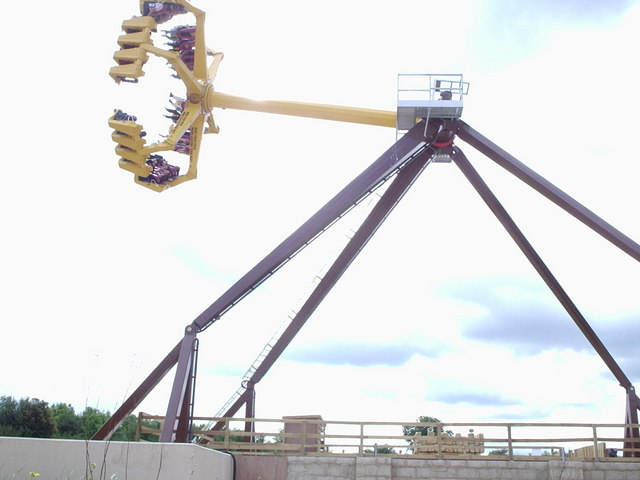

Lightwater Valley
- Status: Closed
- Opening date: 2004

Ride statistics
- Manufacturer: KMG (company)
- Model: Afterburner
- Riders per vehicle: 24
- Rows: 6
- Duration: 3:00
- Height restriction: 140 cm (4 ft 7 in)

Eagle's Claw was a yellow, brown and black KMG Afterburner amusement ride situated in Lightwater Valley, in Ripon, North Yorkshire, England. It is a thrill ride with a height restriction of 1.22 metres, and a capacity of 24 riders. The Keighley News wrote that it "feels like a scarier version of the old Viking longship."

== Closing ==
The Eagle's Claw was closed during July 2017, following a fatal accident on a similar ride in the US. It reopened the following month following safety checks.

The ride was confirmed to be leaving the park for the 2021 season due to a shift to the family market. Following the park's new ownership however, this decision appears to have been changed with the attraction continuing to operate. The ride's height restriction has recently changed from 1.4m to 1.22m.

The release of information from the park for the 2025 season showed Eagles Claw had been removed and replaced with a new family friendly ride, ‘Spin Bug’.

== Theme ==
Although this ride does not have a specific theme, it is dedicated to a bird called Wingnut at the Lightwater Valley Birds of Prey centre.
