= Odinist: The Destruction of Reason by Illumination =

Studio album by Blut Aus Nord
- Released: 2007
- Genres: Atmospheric black metal, industrial metal, dark ambient
- Length: 36:53
- Label: Candlelight Records

Blut Aus Nord chronology
MoRT (2006)	Odinist: The Destruction of Reason by Illumination (2007)	Memoria Vetusta II – Dialogue with the Stars (2009)

Odinist: The Destruction of Reason by Illumination is the sixth album by French avant-garde black metal band Blut Aus Nord. The album's subtitle comes from the writings of Aleister Crowley.

The album was rated 3.5 out of 5 stars by John Stefanis of Get Ready to ROCK!, who wrote that it was "worth getting your hands on."

== Track listing ==
1. "Intro" - 1:30
2. "An Element Of Flesh" - 5:31
3. "The Sounds Of The Universe" - 5:27
4. "Odinist" - 5:02
5. "A Few Shreds Of Thoughts" - 4:52
6. "Ellipsis" - 3:07
7. "Mystic Absolu" - 4:31
8. "The Cycle Of The Cycles" - 5:19
9. "Outro" - 1:39

== Personnel ==
- Vindsval - vocals, electric guitar
- GhÖst - bass guitar
- W.D. Feld - keyboards, drums, percussion

Additional Personnel

- David Cragné - artwork
