= The Mystical Beast of Rebellion =

Studio album by Blut Aus Nord
- Released: 2001, 2010
- Genre: Atmospheric black metal
- Length: 41:22 (single disc); 78:33 (double disc)
- Label: Candlelight Records

Blut Aus Nord chronology
Memoria Vetusta I – Fathers of the Icy Age (1996)	The Mystical Beast of Rebellion (2001)	The Work Which Transforms God (2003)

The Mystical Beast of Rebellion is the 3rd studio album by black metal band Blut Aus Nord. An expanded double-LP version with new material was released in December 2010; a 2-CD version with the new material followed shortly thereafter.

== Critical reception ==
It was rated a four out of ten by Chronicles of Chaos.

== Track listing ==
=== Disc one ===
1. "The Fall: Chapter I" – 6:39
2. "The Fall: Chapter II" – 7:43
3. "The Fall: Chapter III" – 3:38
4. "The Fall: Chapter IV" – 6:50
5. "The Fall: Chapter V" – 6:01
6. "The Fall: Chapter VI" – 10:22

=== Disc two (2010 edition only) ===
1. "The Fall: Chapter 7.7" – 8:20
2. "The Fall: Chapter 7.77" – 9:30
3. "The Fall: Chapter 7.777" – 19:21

== Personnel ==
Blut Aus Nord

- Vindsval - vocals, electric guitar
- Nahaim - bass guitar
- W.D. Feld - keyboards, drums, percussion
