= The Work Which Transforms God =

Studio album by Blut Aus Nord
- Released: March 17, 2003
- Genres: Atmospheric black metal; avant-garde metal; industrial; dark ambient
- Length: 51:29
- Labels: Appease Me Records (2003); Candlelight Records (2004); Debemur Morti Productions (2012)

Blut Aus Nord chronology
The Mystical Beast of Rebellion (2001)	The Work Which Transforms God (2003)	MoRT (2006)

2012 reissue artwork

The Work Which Transforms God is the fourth studio album by black metal band Blut Aus Nord. It showcases the band incorporating industrial and dark ambient elements into their music.

It was first released on March 17, 2003 through Appease Me Records. It was reissued the following year on Candlelight Records with new artwork, and again in 2005 in a version that included the EP Thematic Emanation of Archetypal Multiplicity as a second disc. It was also reissued on CD and vinyl by Debemur Morti Productions on June 21, 2013 featuring new artwork by Valnoir and Dehn Sora. This reissue also featured a cover of Godflesh's song 'Mighty Trust Krusher', originally only available on the 2003 "Godflesh: Tribute" compilation by Nihilistic Holocaust.

The Work Which Transforms God received positive reviews and is considered to be one of Blut Aus Nord's best releases.

== Critical reception ==
Professional ratings
Review scores
Source	Rating
AllMusic	4/5 stars

The album was well received. It has been cited as a breakthrough release for the band as well as for the genre as a whole. In Thom Jurek's review of the album for AllMusic, he describes that "Sonically, these guys love dissonance; they love thick heavy atmospheres and feedback and they love to mess with tempos stretching out time and sending it into a void", concluding "The Work Which Transforms God is a compelling and knotty listen; it squeals, plods, cracks, screeches, whirs and wails in differing shades of black."

In 2013, Decibel ranked it at number 42 on its list of the Top 100 Black Metal Albums of All Time.

== Track listing ==
No.	Title	Length
1.	"End"	1:52
2.	"The Choir of the Dead"	6:40
3.	"Axis"	3:36
4.	"The Fall"	1:32
5.	"Metamorphosis"	5:22
6.	"The Supreme Abstract"	2:59
7.	"Our Blessed Frozen Cells"	7:55
8.	"Devilish Essence"	2:07
9.	"The Howling of God"	6:18
10.	"Inner Mental Cage"	2:55
11.	"Density"	0:18
12.	"Procession of the Dead Clowns"	9:55

== Personnel ==
Blut Aus Nord

- Vindsval - electric guitar
- GhÖst - bass guitar
- W.D. Feld - drums, percussion

Additional Musicians

- Taysiah - vocals
- Nahaim - rhythm guitar

Additional Personnel

- Valnoir - artwork (2012 reissue)
- Dehn Sora - artwork (2012 reissue)
