= Lightwater Valley =

Amusement park in North Yorkshire, England

- Interactive map of Lightwater Valley
- Location: North Stainley, North Yorkshire, England
- Coordinates: 54.1760°N 1.570°W
- Status: Operating
- Opened: Summer 1969
- Owner: Mellors Group
- Operated by: Lightwater Valley Attractions Ltd.
- Operating season: March to November
- Area: 175 acres (71 ha)

Attractions
- Total: 37
- Roller coasters: 3
- Water rides: 1
- Website: lightwatervalley.co.uk

Lightwater Valley Family Adventure Park is an adventure park in North Stainley, North Yorkshire, England. The park was once home to the longest roller coaster in the world, The Ultimate. Founded by Robert Staveley in 1969, it is now owned and operated by the Mellors Group, who purchased it in 2025. As of 2019, the park attracted approximately 300,000 visitors per year; in 2024, it had 231,565 visitors.

== History ==
=== Staveley family ===
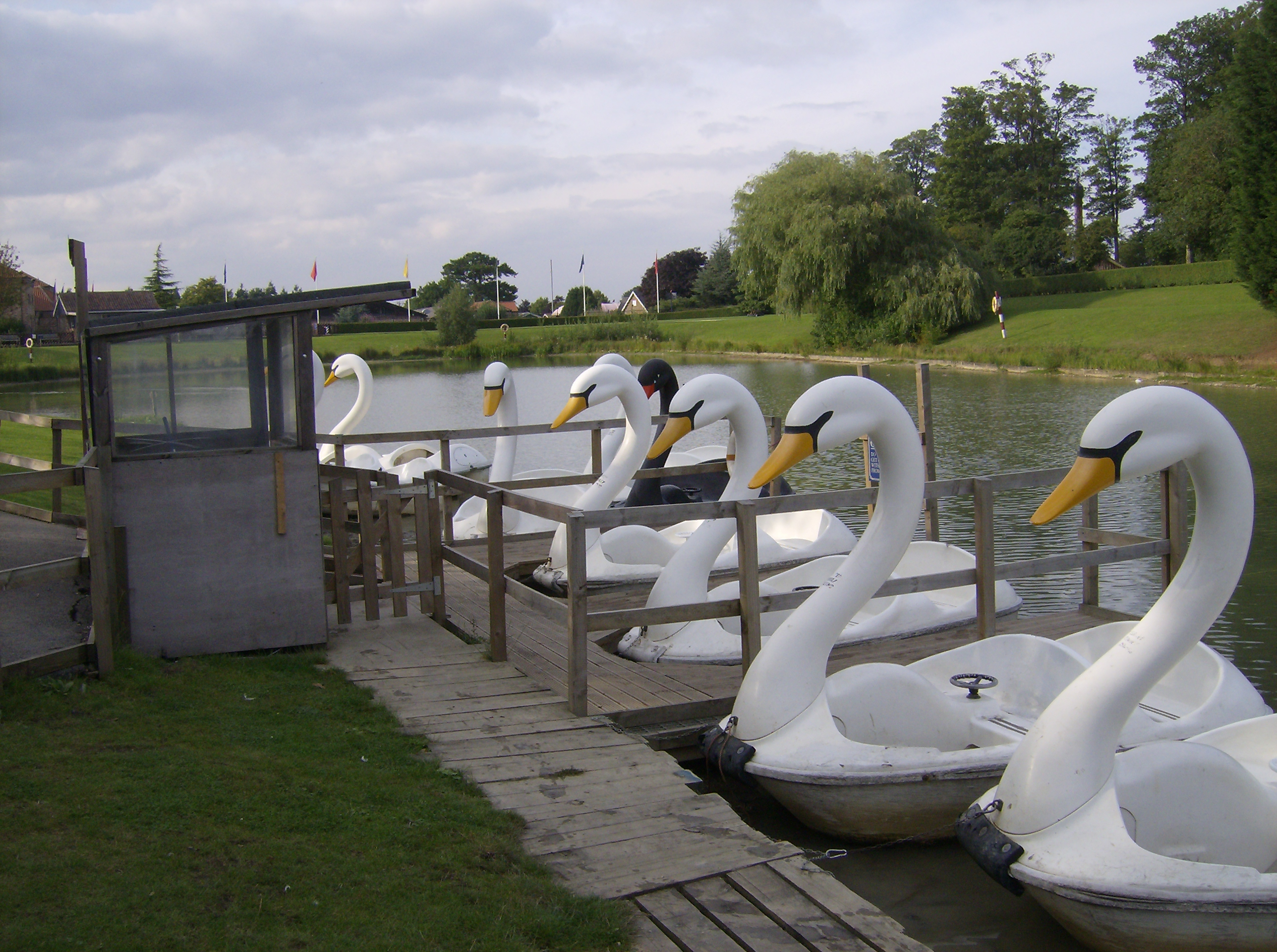
Swan Lake Boats in the lake at Light Water Valley

In 1969, Lightwater Valley began as a small self-pick fruit farm, run by the Staveley family, who had owned the land since 1516. In 1976, the farm was affected by drought, resulting in the excavation of a lake to help reduce the effects of future droughts. The lake's popularity instigated the transition of the farm into a tourist attraction. Early attractions included the Lightwater Express miniature train in 1979, an adventure playground (later Fort William) and later a roller-skating rink, a BMX bike track, a pitch and putt golf course, a hell slide and a water chute. The park was advertised as a country park and self-pick fruit farm with a pay-one-price and ride-all-day system in place, with the exception of a small number of pay-to-play attractions. A range of different fairground rides were introduced into the entrance areas of the park and the Lightwater Shopping Village was established.

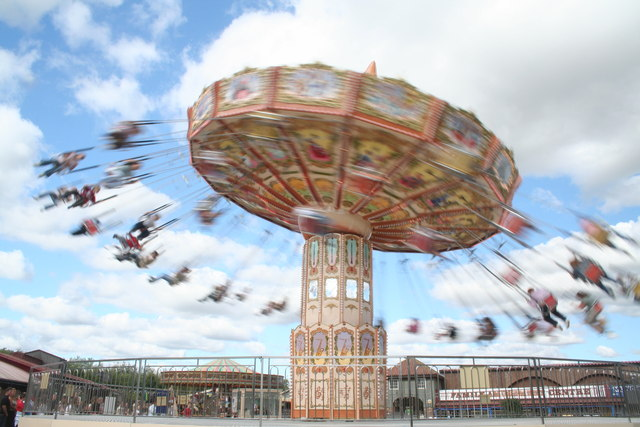
Skyrider

The Lightwater Valley Theme Park was born when the Sewer Rat, also known as the Rat Ride, was built in 1987. Robert Staveley wanted to expand on the family market and also provide something for the thrill market. At the time, his wife was a keen protector of the country park status and did not like the idea of having a roller coaster. After much discussion, she permitted the construction of a roller coaster as long as it was out of sight. To accommodate his wife's wishes, Robert decided that he would bury the roller coaster underground and it became based on the dwellings of a sewer rat. The ride was constructed by blasting large amounts of rock (which was sold) and capping the hole and exposed sides with a large barn-style building. The ride attracted much attention, nearly doubling gate figures and paving the way for future developments including the park's first looping coaster, the Soopa Loopa, in 1988 which featured two vertical loops and a backward facing ride car.

Following the success of the Rat Ride, Robert Staveley persuaded his wife that a 'proper' roller coaster should be built. He liked the idea of having a roller coaster coming down the valley at the top of the park, but was faced with the challenge of getting people to the top of the valley to board the train. His wife suggested that the train be sent out to the top and then returned with the aid of two drops. In 1990, construction began on what would become the world's longest roller coaster, over 1.5 miles (2.4 km) in length. The Ultimate was opened to the public in 1991 and as of 2022 was still the longest roller coaster in Europe.

Additional rides and attractions were added throughout the decade, including roller coasters such as The Viper, The Batflyer, and The Ladybird, and water rides such as the Beaver Rapids log flume and Splash Falls. A number of rides, including the Beaver Rapids and the Heatwave, were opened on short-term leases instead of being purchased.

=== Later ownership ===
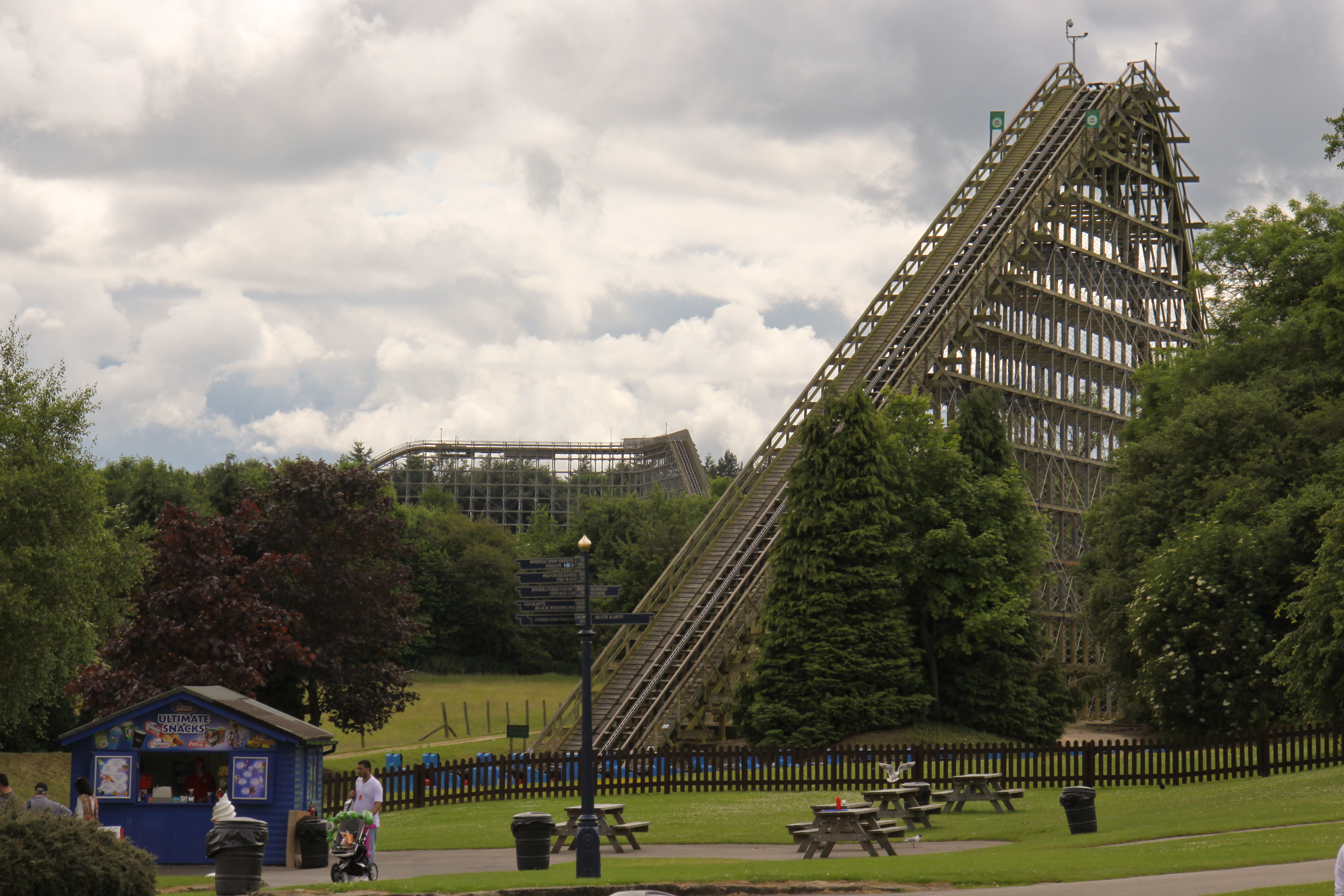
Lift hills of The Ultimate (1991–2019)

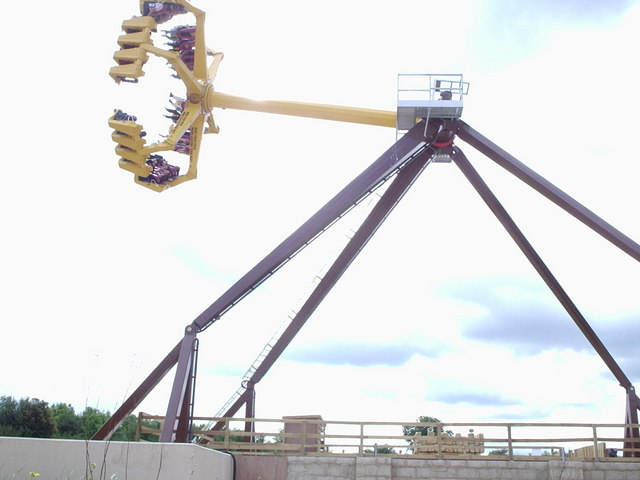
The Eagle's Claw (2004-2024)

In the mid-1990s, Robert Staveley handed the park over to his children, Amanda and James. However, in 1997, there was a change of ownership from the private family firm to Queensborough Holdings, who bought a 99-year leasehold for £5.2 million. The park was sold because it had run into financial difficulties following the heavy expenditure on The Ultimate.

Queensborough Holdings was also in ownership of the Pleasurewood Hills Theme Park at the time. Both parks were operated by their subsidiary Leisure Great Britain. However, the new owners put the park back up for sale within 11 months of buying it. No bid was accepted during the following few years, but in February 2001 the park was bought by Ball Investments, who used Heritage Great Britain to manage the operations. The new ownership brought about rapid investment in ride offerings and brand imaging with new logos, mascots, websites and rides such as The Treetop Twister and Black Widow's Web in the first year, followed by rides such as The Octopus, The Eagle's Claw, The Grizzly Bear, The Caterpillar Coaster, Trauma Tower and Skyrider. The Bird Of Prey Centre also opened next to the adventure park.

After a fatal accident on the Treetop Twister ride in 2001, guest figures plummeted. Improvements were made including: refurbishment of the Sewer Rat in 2009 and re-theming as Raptor Attack; the introduction of the first themed 'area', 'Skeleton Cove', with five new rides (bought from the now defunct Loudoun Castle park in Scotland); along with new family friendly attractions such as the Angry Birds Activity Park, Eagles Creek Farm, the Vintage Car Rally and Jurassic mini golf course. Successful events such as the annual Frightwater Valley Halloween event, Pirates & Princesses weekend, and UK bungee jump days have attracted large gate figures.

During the late 2000s, talk began of the potential development of Lightwater Resorts. Initial planning permission for holiday caravans and log cabins was rejected by Harrogate Borough Council due to concerns about the impact on traffic and local businesses. The park re-designed and re-submitted their planning permission for 106 log cabins, which was then granted.

In June 2017, the park was sold to attractions operator Livingstone Leisure Ltd for an undisclosed amount. The Bird Of Prey Centre was also closed at the end of the 2018 season.

In 2021 the park announced it would be re-calibrating its attraction offering by focussing on the younger family audience. A number of older thrill rides were retired and new rides suited to younger children introduced. The Ultimate remained closed for the 2020 and 2021 seasons and a decision was made to dismantle the ride in 2023.

In June 2021, the park was sold to The Brighton Pier Group for £5 million. For the 2022 season the park received a major rebrand as a family park catering primarily to children under twelve, with a new logo, new mascot and name change to 'Lightwater Valley Family Adventure Park'. The Go Safari area opened as part of this refocussing.

Planning permission was granted in January 2024 for the siting of 31 luxury glamping pods in the north eastern woodland area of the park instead of the 106 lodges originally planned.

In October 2025 the park was listed for sale with an asking price of £3 million. In December 2025 the leasehold (72 years remaining) of the park was sold to the Mellors Group, owners of Fantasy Island in Ingoldmells. The director James Mellors has announced plans to provide attractions for all ages.

== Rides and attractions ==
Lightwater Valley has 39 rides and attractions.

=== Attractions Key ===
Colour	Category
	The Village
	Go Safari
	Skeleton Cove
	Top Thrills
	Lakeside
	Eagles Creek
	Discovery Woods
	Dino-Roar Adventures

=== The Village ===
No.	Name	Opened	Manufacturer	Brief Description
1	Valley Theatre			Theatre with stage shows and entertainment
2	Ebor's Soft Play	2016		A jungle-themed soft play area for the under 7s, with café for parents.
3	Lightwater Valley Express Train	1979	Severn Lamb	A 15 in (381 mm) gauge narrow gauge railway, which operates around the perimeter of the park. Two steam-outline diesel locomotives are employed. Height limit 1.3m to ride (under 1.3m may ride if accompanied by someone minimum 16 years old and 1.3m)
4	Skyrider	2006	Technical Park	A rock 'n' roll-themed Chair-O-Plane ride; height limit 1.3m
5	Carousel	2008	J. H. Rundle	Traditional fairground galloping horses and chariots; height limit 1.2m to ride horses unaccompanied, 1.0m or accompanied by someone minimum 16 years old 1.2m
6	Junior Drivers	2026		A junior driving school

=== Go Safari ===
#	Name	Opened	Manufacturer	Brief Description
7	Savanna Express	2021	Zamperla	A children's train ride through African savannah, desert and jungle with life size animals. 1m+ to ride unaccompanied (under 1m can ride if accompanied by someone min. 16 years old and 1m+)
8	Monkey Drop	2021	SBF Visa Group	A junior drop tower ride. Relocated from Fantasy Island, Skegness.
9	Jungle Jump	2017		Huge inflatable bouncy pillow 46 ft x 33 ft. Under 1.2 m in height to bounce (Under 5's must have 1:1 supervision by an adult).
10	Outdoor Play	2013		An interactive outdoor play zone for under 12 year olds. Formerly known as the Angry Birds Activity Park. Parental supervision required at all times.
11	Jeep Safari	2024		A Safari themed Jeep car ride

=== Skeleton Cove ===
#	Name	Opened	Manufacturer	Brief Description
12	Flying Cutlass	2011	Huss	A swinging pirate ship; height limit 1.4m. Part of Skeleton Cove.
13	Powder Kegs	2011	Huss	A 1998 Rodeo/Breakdance 4-ride themed around explosive barrels of gunpowder; height limit 1.3m, 1.2m when accompanied by an adult.
14	Skull Rock	2011	Zamperla	A Regatta ride, boats follow undulating track at speed; height limit 1.3m or 1.1m if accompanied by someone minimum 16 years old and 1,3m. Part of Skeleton Cove.
15	Pirate Swinger	2011	Park Rides	Junior chair swings; height limit 0.9m-1.3m, no adults. Part of Skeleton Cove.
16	Wave Rider	2011	Modern Products	Mini Swinging Ship. Height limit 1.2m to ride or 1.0m if accompanied by someone minimum 16 years old and 1.2m. Did not operate in the 2022 season, but returned for 2023.
17	Adventure Play	2017		Interactive outdoor playground with net swings, slides and climbing frames. Under 12s only, parental supervision required at all times.

=== Top Thrills ===
#	Name	Opened	Manufacturer	Brief Description
18	Clownaround	1995	Modern Products	Clown themed roundabout ride. Height limit 1.1m to ride or 0.9m if accompanied by someone minimum 16 years old and 1.1m.
19	Dragon Boats	2007	Diamond Electronics	Boat roundabout ride. Height limit 1.1m to ride or 0.9m if accompanied by someone minimum 16 years old and 1.1m.
20	Hot Air Balloons	2021	Güven Amusement Rides	A lifting balloon roundabout ride.
21	Skate Karts	1990*	Unknown	A skateboard attraction where riders raced down a banked concrete track on "Skate Karts". *Removed from the park in 2018, but re-opened for the 2023 season using same track.
22	Vintage Cars	2015	Metallbau Emmeln	A vintage car rally ride with cars guided around a set track. Height limit 1.3m or 0.9m if accompanied by someone minimum 16 years old and 1.3m. Rethemed with Alice in Wonderland props for 2023.
23	Ladybird	1993	Zierer	A family coaster; height limit 1.3 m or 1.1 m if accompanied by someone minimum 16 years old and 1.3 m (4 ft 3 in).
24	Caterpillar	2003	D.P.V. Rides (Pinfari)	A small, gentle children's rollercoaster; height limit 1.3 m (4 ft 3 in) or 1.1 m (3 ft 7 in) if accompanied by someone minimum 16 years old and 1.3 m (4 ft 3 in). Renamed from Little Dipper to Caterpillar in 2023.
25	Spinning Racer	2026	Maurer Söhne	A spinning steel roller coaster. Height limit 1.2m to ride.

=== Lakeside ===
#	Name	Opened	Manufacturer	Brief Description
26	Splash Falls	1995	WhiteWater West	3 different water dinghy slides. Each dinghy seats 2 persons; height limit 1.3m unaccompanied. Slides 1&2: 1.2m if accompanied by someone minimum 16 years old and 1.3m. Slide 3: 1.1m if accompanied by someone minimum 16 years old and 1.3m.
27	Swan Boats	1987	Unknown	Pedal Boats; All under 16's must be accompanied by an adult (min. 0.9m in height)
28	Elephant Flight	2021	Kolmax-Plus	A flying elephant roundabout ride where riders can control the height of their elephant.
29	Kangaroo Jump	2021	Güven Amusement Rides	A small children's bouncing roundabout ride.
30	Lightwater Wheel	2026	Bussink	A giant observation wheel

=== Eagles Creek ===
#	Name	Opened	Manufacturer	Brief Description
31	Dragon Drop	2004	Moser's Rides	Small family orientated 5 + 5 drop tower; height limit 1.3m or 1.0m if accompanied by someone minimum 16 years old 1.3m. Formerly Trauma Tower, renamed to Dragon Drop for the 2022 season.
32	Eagles Creek Farm	2013	Metallbau Emmeln	A tractor ride. Height limit 1.3m to ride or 0.9m if accompanied by someone minimum 16 years old and 1.3m.
33	Spin Bug	2025	Zamperla	A junior rocking tug style attraction themed to a caterpillar

=== Discovery Woods ===
#	Name	Opened	Manufacturer	Brief Description
34	Lakeside Walk	2024		A lakeside nature trail.
35	Woodland Play	2019		An indoor interactive play zone for 4–7 year olds. Parental supervision required at all times. Formerly Jester's Jungle Fun, renamed to Woodland Play for the 2022 season.

=== Dino-Roar Adventures ===
#	Name	Opened	Manufacturer	Brief Description
36	Dino Dig	2023		Sandpit digging activity to discover the bones, teeth and claws of Rex the Valleysaurus's ancestors.
37	Jurassic Adventure Golf	2015	AC Attractions	A dinosaur themed pay-to-play miniature golf course situated just outside of the park entrance.

=== Park Mascots ===
Under Queensborough Holding's ownership, the park had a single mascot, Woody the Bear. In 2001, Ball Investments introduced the Valligators to the park. The Valligators were three green alligator-costumed entertainers who acted as the park's mascots named Harry, Sally and Baby Al. In 2017, Livingstone Leisure replaced the Valligators with two new dinosaur mascots called Jester and Jasmine. From 2022, new owners Brighton Pier Leisure Group introduced Ebor the Dragon and the next season in 2023, Rex the Valleysaurus.

== Incidents ==
On 21 June 2001, 20-year-old Gemma Savage died following an accident the previous day when two carriages collided on Treetop Twister, a spinning Wild Mouse roller coaster, which had opened in May of that year. Police decided not to prosecute a maintenance worker, who claimed that he had only received an hour of training on the ride and had not seen its manual. Faulty wiring had also caused a malfunction on the ride. In October 2004, Deputy Coroner John Sleightholme at Skipton Magistrates' Court ruled death by misadventure.

Lightwater Valley's owners and electrician Eric Butters admitted to breaching health and safety laws at Leeds Crown Court on 14 November 2006. Lightwater Valley Attractions Ltd was charged with failing to ensure the health and safety of riders. Butters was charged with failing to ensure safety through his work. Both pleaded guilty. A French manufacturer, Reverchon Industries SA, was convicted of two charges of failing to ensure the ride's safe design and construction.

In May 2019, a young boy fell 30 ft from the same ride (now simply called the Twister) and was left in critical condition. The ride was sold to a UK based showman at the end of the 2019 season. The park was fined £350,000 for health and safety breaches.

== Energy efficiency ==
In 2015, the park reported energy efficiency savings of around £130,000 a year stemming from an investment in renewable technologies. These include new carbon-neutral biomass boilers producing 400 kW per unit, enabling the park to move away from the conventional oil-based heating system. In addition, a new ground-mounted photovoltaic array was installed in the adjacent fields, which has supplied up to 45% of the park's energy demand. Much of the rest of the energy demand for the rides is met by means of diesel generators.

== Past attractions ==
#	Name	Opened	Closed	Brief Description	Replaced by
1	Toad Hole	1985	2006	A semi-enclosed water chute, formerly called 'Devil's Cascade'. Left SBNO after closure.	Lightwater Wheel
2	The Sewer Rat	1987	2009	A Schwarzkopf Wildcat Type roller coaster, also known as 'The Rat Ride'.	Raptor Attack
3	Soopa Loopa	1988	1994	A double looping roller coaster manufactured by Soquet	Falls Of Terror
4	The Wave	1990	2010	A large Zamperla swinging ship located in the woods which closed because of a new pirate ship (The Flying Cutlass) opening in Skeleton Cove. Sold to Alex Crow.	The Flying Cutlass
5	Grand Prix Go Karts	1991	2010	Traditional go-kart track.	Skeleton Cove
6	The Mexican Hat	1994	2005	An ARM Trabant ride. Originally located at the park entrance area, then moved next to where Flying Camels is now.	The Octopus
7	Viper/Zyklen	1996	2001	A City Jet / Jet 400 type ride manufactured by Schwarzkopf.	Eagle's Claw
8	The Batflyer	1996	2002	A steel suspended roller coaster.	The Caterpillar Coaster
9	The Orbiter	1998	2004	A Schwarzkopf Apollo ride owned by the Bembom Brothers and leased to Lightwater Valley. Chair swing variant. First opened with the name 'Heatwave'.	The Octopus
10	Beaver Rapids	2000	2002	A Reverchon two drop Log Flume ride.	Grizzly Bear
11	Grizzly Bear	2004	2008	A Pinfari Zyklon-type Roller Coaster.	Wild River Rapids (until 2014) Vintage Car Rally (2015 onwards)
12	The Octopus	2005	2006	A Soriani & Moser Polyp ride owned by John Armitage and leased to Lightwater Valley for two seasons.	Skyrider (2006) and Flying Camels (2007)
13	Hornets Nest	2007	2009	A 1998 Chance Chaos purchased from Pleasureland Southport. Scrapped.	Whirlwind
14	Whirlwind	2010	2011	A Mondial Top Scan (leased for one season from Alex Crow)	Eagles Creek Farm
15	Whirlwind	2011	2015	A Mondial Top Scan. Sold to UK based showman Joe William Whitelegg.	Apollo
16	Lightwater Wheel	2008	2016	A Technical Park 82-ft observation wheel. Sold to Alex Crow.	Flying Nellies (on loan from Alex Crow)
17	Buffalo Express	2003	2016	Mini Train Ride	Interactive Playground
18	Flying Camels	2007	2016	Aerial carousel ride featuring camels purchased from Pleasureland Southport. Sold to Alex Crow.	Mini Sand Diggers
19	Black Widow's Web	2001	2017	A Huss Enterprise (on loan from John Armitage).	'Thunderdome' Waltzer (on loan from John Armitage)
20	Twister (formerly Treetop Twister)	2001	2019	A Reverchon spinning wild mouse coaster. Sold to UK based showman Emerson Edwards.	Dodgems (on loan from John Armitage)
21	Spinning Teacups		2019	Spinning tea cups	
22	Mini Ferris Wheel		2019	Mini ferris wheel	
23	Raptor Attack	2010	2019	A Schwarzkopf Wildcat roller coaster. First operated as the Sewer Rat from 1987 to 2009 prior to retheme. Sold to COTALAND (Austin, Texas, USA)	
24	Apollo	2016	2019	An AK Rides star flyer on loan from Alex Crow	Twist and Turn (on loan from Robert Wilkinson)
25	Wild River Rapids	2009	2020	A Reverchon river rapids ride. Sold back to Mellors Group, and now operates under the same name at Fantasy Island, Ingoldmells.	Dodgems (on loan from Robert Wilkinson)
26	Black Pearl	2011	2020	A Weber Traum Boot	
27	The Ultimate	1991	2019	A hybrid roller coaster once the longest in the world, designed by Big Country Motioneering and Robert Staveley. Scrapped 2023.	
28	Thunderdome	2018	2022	A Waltzer on loan from John Armitage	
29	Ladybug	1995	2023	A Modern Products Ladybug themed roundabout ride	
30	Animal Carnival	2007	2023	A zoo animal themed roundabout ride	
31	Treetop Trails	2016	2023	Suspended woodland net trail	
32	Eagle's Claw	2004	2024	KMG Afterburner	Spin Bug
33	Space Pirates	1999	2025	Modern Products junior roundabout	
34	Tiki Raft	2023	2025	Zamperla junior miami	Junior Drivers

=== The Ultimate ===
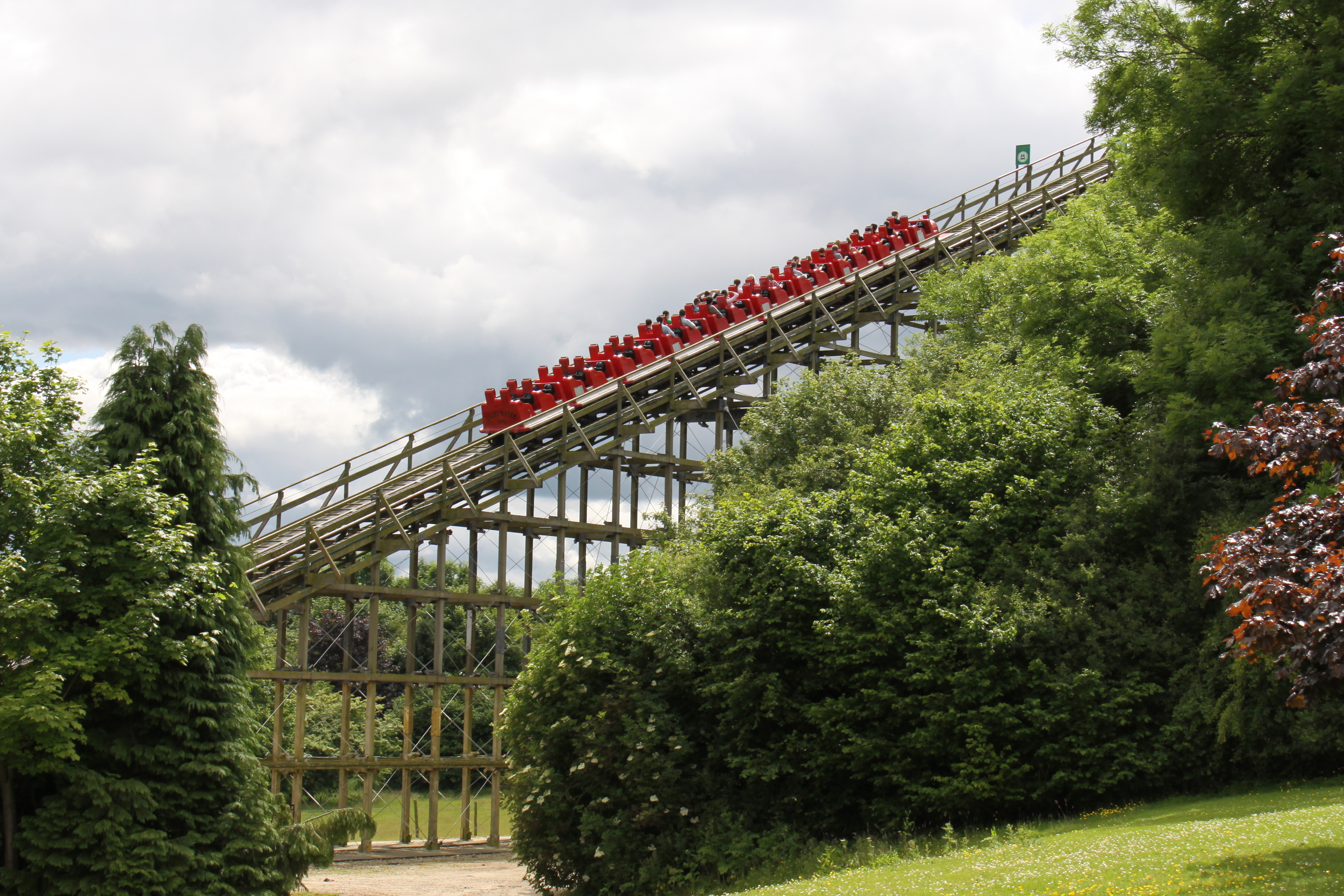
One of the two "Ultimate" trains on the first lift hill

The Ultimate was designed by Big Country Motioneering (BCM) and the park's original owner, Robert Staveley. Construction began in early 1990, taking 18 months to complete. The ride's Canadian redwood trestles and large station building were constructed by Staveley's in-house construction team, which was responsible for building Lightwater Valley's other buildings. The metal track work was ordered from BCM who used fabricators 'Tubular Engineering' to manufacture it. However, much of the installation was largely undertaken in-house and supervised by engineers from British Rail after BCM were sacked due to track problems and slow progress. The scale of the project led to both contracted companies going bankrupt halfway through its construction, leaving Staveley's team and British Rail to finish the project on their own. Staveley got assistance from American and German roller coaster manufacturers, who advised him to ensure that there was enough flexibility in the track to allow for expansion and contraction under fluctuating temperatures. Overall, the project was over a year behind schedule and went significantly over budget. Staveley wanted to ensure that he was the first to ride his creation well in advance of its opening in order to give himself time to improve and re-work areas of track. He did so by riding in one of the trains that had not yet been fitted with any restraints, using only rope to secure himself.

The ride was opened on 17 July 1991 by Frank Bruno. When opened, it was the world's longest rollercoaster at 1.5 miles (2.4 km), taking over 5 minutes to ride, and costing £5.2 million. Initially, Staveley had not set out to break any records and it was only once construction had gotten underway that a colleague exclaimed that there couldn't be a roller coaster longer than the one they were building. Later that day, a colleague was sent to Ripon to buy the Guinness Book of Records, which confirmed that the length of track that Staveley had ordered was well over the record. The Ultimate has two trains, which have both been reverted to the original navy blue colour after serving 17 years as red and blue. The trains also used to have over-the-shoulder restraints until 1992 when they were removed and replaced with lap bar restraints to improve the ride experience.

A number of modifications had to be made following the ride's opening. After a season of operation, a significant number of the bogies and wheels had cracks in them, resulting in subsequent replacement and strengthening. The wheels were found to be getting too hot so larger wheels had to be fitted instead. One of the trains suffered from a wheel collapse on one of the train car chassis, resulting in minor injuries as the train coasted to a gradual stop.

In 2016, Lightwater Valley celebrated 25 years of The Ultimate.

The Ultimate did not operate during the 2020 season and remained closed throughout 2021. Following their takeover of the park, The Brighton Pier Group's Chief Executive stated, 'The Ultimate is not dead in the water. It needs some work doing on it, but we are more than conscious of its iconic status. If we can do something with it, then we will. Obviously, safety has got to be the priority, so in due course, we will have a look at it and make sure it complies with modern standards. It is quite unique. There are options to shorten it a little bit or to change its track. You wouldn't want something that large in your back garden and not be able to use it, would you?' The park confirmed on 11 January 2023 that the ride would be dismantled, citing prohibitive costs in updating it. The process of dismantling and scrapping the ride began in February 2023. Much of the ride's structure was completely removed by April 2023.

== Gallery ==
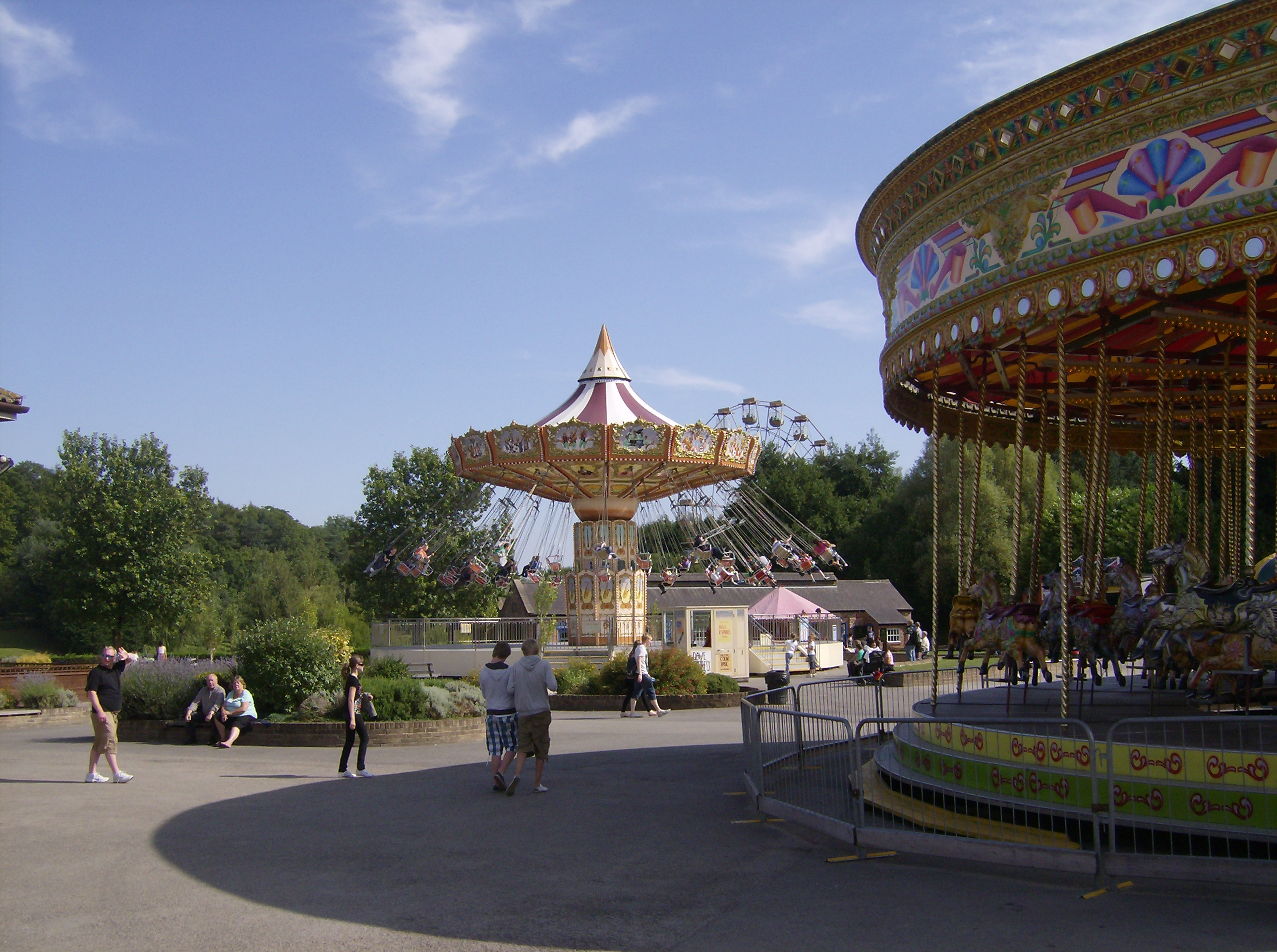
Rides near the entrance of Lightwater Valley

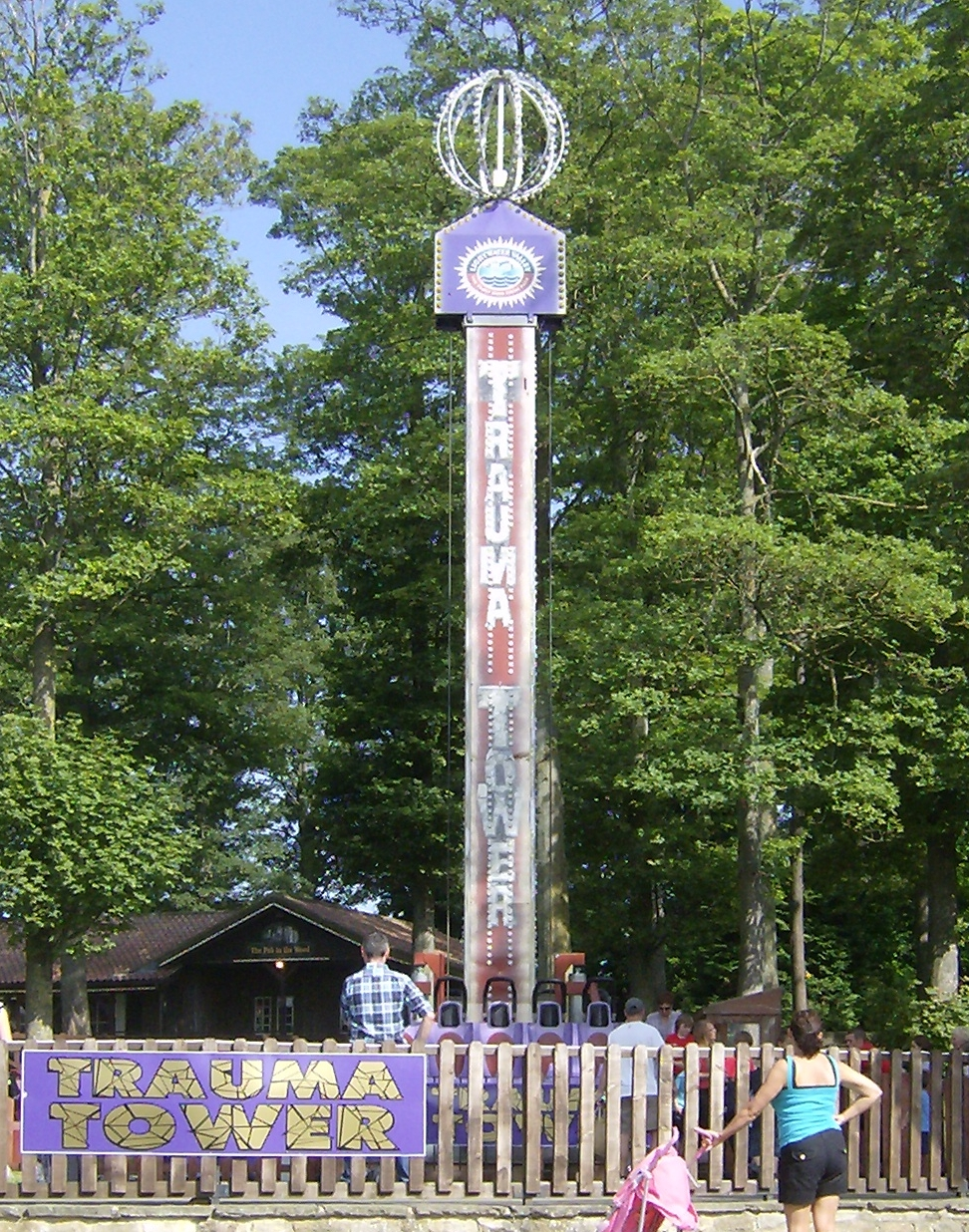
"Trauma Tower", now renamed "Dragon Drop"

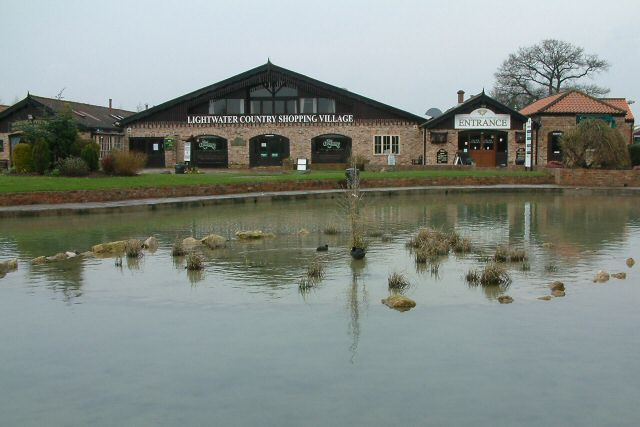
Lightwater Shopping Village

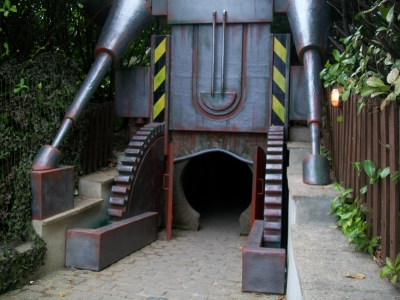
Entrance to Raptor Attack
