= Daidarasaurus =

Roller coaster in Japan

Expoland
- Location: Expoland
- Coordinates: 34°48′16″N 135°32′09″E
- Status: Removed
- Opening date: 1970
- Closing date: December 9, 2007

General statistics
- Type: Steel – Dueling
- Manufacturer: Sansei Technologies
- Lift/launch system: Two chain lift hills
- Height: 28 m (92 ft)
- Length: 2,340 m (7,680 ft)
- Speed: 72 km/h (45 mph)
- Inversions: 0
- Duration: 6:33
- Daidarasaurus at RCDB

Daidarasaurus was a steel roller coaster located at Expoland in Suita, Osaka, Japan. According to some sources, including the Roller Coaster DataBase, Daidarasaurus was the second longest roller coaster in the world, behind Steel Dragon 2000. Other sources, such as the Guinness Book of World Records, did not recognize Daidarasaurus's claim as longest roller coaster in the world from 1999 to 2000. Daidarasaurus has now been demolished as Expoland is now permanently closed.

== History ==
Daidarasaurus opened with the park in 1970, and consisted of 5 separate tracks. These were a smaller, more family scale rollercoaster, 2 racing coasters, and 2 dueling coasters, the tallest out of all of them, as the other three shared the same lower height. In 1999 the two taller dueling tracks were combined at the end of the ride to create one exceptionally long track with two lift hills. This also made it a Quasi Möbius Loop. This effectively doubled the length of the ride. What remains in dispute is whether this actually qualified as one long coaster or back-to-back rides on the same coaster. The three other coasters were removed when this conversion happened, with the majority of their supports remaining until the whole coaster’s demolition.

Preceded by Ultimate	World's Longest Roller Coaster; 1999 – August 2000	Succeeded by Steel Dragon 2000
