= 777 – Cosmosophy =

Studio album by Blut Aus Nord
- Released: September 21, 2012
- Recorded: 2012
- Genres: Black metal, industrial metal, avant-garde metal
- Length: 45:55
- Label: Debemur Morti Productions (DMP0082)

Blut Aus Nord chronology
777 – The Desanctification (2011)	777 – Cosmosophy (2012)	Memoria Vetusta III: Saturnian Poetry (2014)

777 – Cosmosophy is the tenth full-length album by French black metal band Blut Aus Nord. It was released on September 21, 2012 through Debemur Morti Productions. This is the third and final album of the 777 trilogy that began with the 2011 album 777 – Sect(s). The album was recorded, mixed, and mastered at Earthsound Recording in 2012 and the artwork was created by Dehn Sora in collaboration with Metastazis Studios.

== Critical reception ==
Professional ratings
Review scores
Source	Rating
About.com	4/5 stars
Allmusic	4.5/5 stars
Pitchfork	8.5/10
PopMatters	7/10 stars

The album was received positively upon release, with reviewers praising experimental nature of the album, with Pitchfork's Grayson Currin writing that "Every listen to a Blut Aus Nord album, no matter how familiar, seems to reveal a new pattern or seam that you've missed only because it's so well integrated. If black metal was once the primordial punk rock of some angry and infamous kids, it is, for Blut Aus Nord, the foundation for a very ornate institution." Pitchfork's Brandon Stosuy later named it the 4th best metal album of 2012, praising its "chiming group melodies, psychedelic guitars, swirling beds of electronics, and post-metal hooks".

== Track listing ==
All tracks are written by Vindsval.

No.	Title	Length
1.	"Epitome XIV"	8:55
2.	"Epitome XV"	6:14
3.	"Epitome XVI"	10:18
4.	"Epitome XVII"	9:27
5.	"Epitome XVIII"	11:01
Total length:		45:55
