= 777 – The Desanctification =

Studio album by Blut Aus Nord
- Released: November 11, 2011
- Recorded: Earthbound Studios
- Genres: Black metal, industrial metal, avant-garde metal
- Length: 43:44
- Label: Debemur Morti Productions (DMP0070)

Blut Aus Nord chronology
777 – Sect(s) (2011)	777 – The Desanctification (2011)	777 – Cosmosophy (2012)

777 – The Desanctification is the ninth full-length album by French black metal band Blut Aus Nord. It was released on November 11, 2011 through Debemor Morti Productions. It is the second album of the '777 Trilogy'. The album was recorded, mixed, and mastered at Earthbound Studios, and the artwork was created by Valnoir of Metastazis.

== Writing, composition ==
The album was written and performed entirely by Vindsval. He explained that "The trilogy 777 is a very personal project – it was absolutely impossible for me to let someone else work on it. It was the same thing for MoRT – this is my soul and my flesh." In an interview with Invisible Oranges, Vindsval described the concept behind the album:

Before the learning of freedom, of instinct, of pure life, this man disowns God. The Desanctification represents this precise moment of monumental solitude. God is dead (no matter), but you are still the consequence of past centuries, you are still a reaction, the slave of your thought patterns, and they create a new form of endless fear. This is The Desanctification, the distress of an orphan face to face with the morbid breath of the universe.

— Vindsval, "Invisible Oranges"

== Critical reception ==
Professional ratings
Review scores
Source	Rating
AllMusic	4/5 stars
Exclaim!	Positive
Pitchfork	8.2/10

The album was received well by critics, with particular praise being offered towards the album's unpredictable nature and complex songwriting. Stereogum's Tom Breihan named it 'Album of the Week' following its release, describing it as "a forbidding slab of unadorned hate, compellingly rendered. It’s the sort of thing that can send you into a staring-into-nothingness zone-out for periods of time long enough to make your loved ones uncomfortable."

Pitchfork's Brandon Stosuy picked '777 – Sect(s)' and '777 – The Desanctification' as the two best metal albums of 2011, writing that "Beyond the experimentation, both of these records also really move-- you could almost dance to the latter." The albums were also featured on the site's honourable mentions for overall album of the year by Philip Sherburne.

== Track listing ==
All tracks are written by Vindsval.

No.	Title	Length
1.	"Epitome VII"	8:28
2.	"Epitome VIII"	6:27
3.	"Epitome IX"	2:08
4.	"Epitome X"	7:22
5.	"Epitome XI"	6:15
6.	"Epitome XII"	5:56
7.	"Epitome XIII"	7:07
