= Caterpillar 777 =

100-ton haul truck

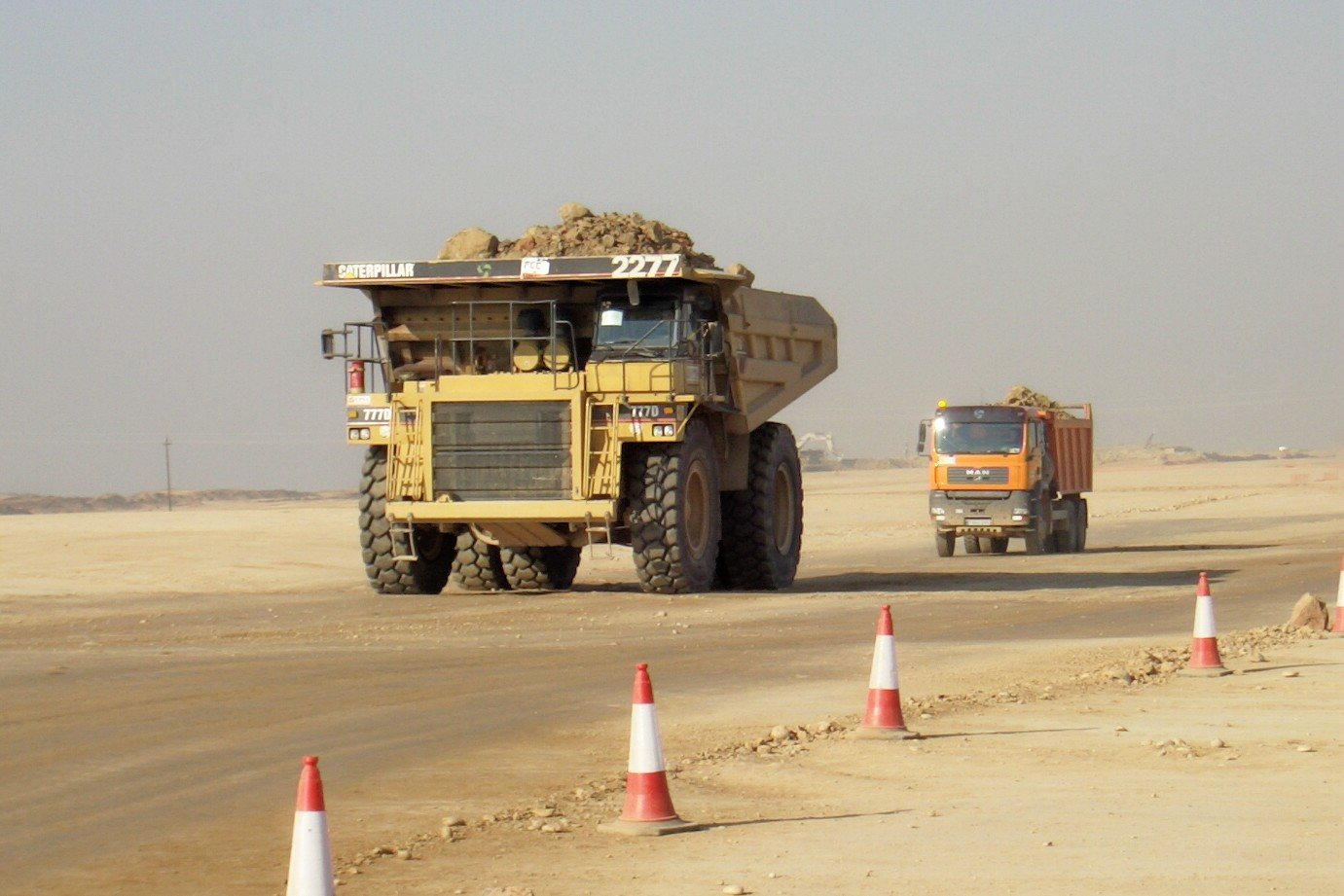
A Caterpillar 777D followed by a conventionally sized dump truck

The Caterpillar 777 is a 100-ton haul truck, typically used in open pit mining, manufactured by Caterpillar Inc.

The first model of Caterpillar 777 was introduced in 1974. Its diesel engine is capable of putting out 870 horsepower (650 kW). The 777D, introduced in 1996, was powered by a 938-horsepower (699 kW) diesel.

A Caterpillar 777 at the open pit mining site Lhoist in Menden, Germany

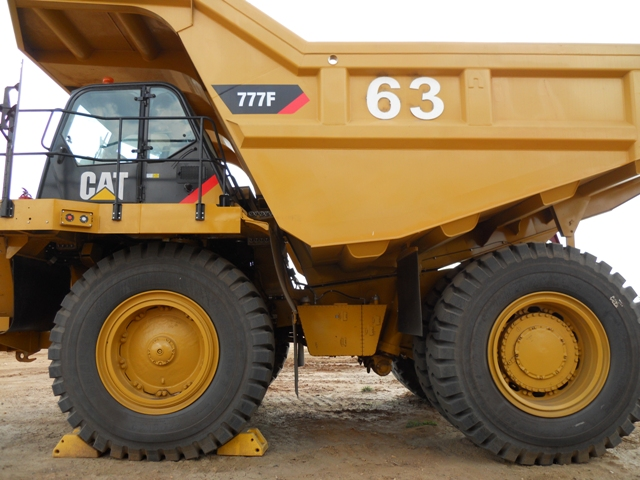
