= MoRT =

Studio album by Blut Aus Nord
- Released: October 23, 2006
- Genre: Avant-garde metal, industrial black metal
- Length: 47:15
- Label: Candlelight Records

Blut Aus Nord chronology
The Work Which Transforms God (2003)	MoRT (2006)	Odinist: The Destruction of Reason by Illumination (2007)

MoRT (an acronym for "Metamorphosis of Realistic Theories"; Mort is also the French word for death) is an album by French black metal band Blut Aus Nord, released in 2006. The album showcases the band expanding upon the experimentation of their previous release The Work Which Transforms God by abandoning traditional songwriting in favour of free-form dissonance.

== Album Information ==
Before the album was released, an alternate set of song titles was leaked, yet it did not correspond to the number of tracks that appeared on the finished album. This is perhaps a hint that this would originally have been a double album or part of a concept that is yet unfinished.

== Track listing ==
1. "Chapter I" - 6:04
2. "Chapter II" - 4:44
3. "Chapter III" - 5:08
4. "Chapter IV" - 5:41
5. "Chapter V" - 6:35
6. "Chapter VI" - 5:02
7. "Chapter VII" - 6:39
8. "Chapter VIII" - 7:20

== Pre-release track listing leak ==
1. Ruins of the Genesis (Antiparticles)
2. Dis-Harmonization of All Visual Echoes
3. Fusion with the Zero
4. Samsaric Ocean
5. The Meditation of the Ghost (Samadhi)
6. Le Cercle de Ceux Qui Pleurent
7. Alienation of the Orphans

"Le Cercle de Ceux Qui Pleurent" translates as "The Circle of Those Who Cry".

== Personnel ==
- Vindsval - vocals, electric guitar
- GhÖst - bass guitar
- W.D. Feld - keyboards, drums, percussion

Additional Personnel

- David Cragné - artwork
