= 777 – Sect(s) =

Studio album by Blut Aus Nord
- Released: April 18, 2011
- Recorded: Earthsound Studio
- Genres: Black metal, industrial metal, avant-garde metal, post-metal
- Length: 45:26
- Label: Debemur Morti (DMP0068)

Blut Aus Nord chronology
Memoria Vetusta II – Dialogue with the Stars (2009)	777 – Sect(s) (2011)	777 – The Desanctification (2011)

777 – Sect(s) is the eighth full-length album by French black metal band Blut Aus Nord. The album was released on April 18, 2011 through Debemur Morti Productions. It is the first album in the 777 trilogy, and was followed by 777 – The Desanctification and 777 – Cosmosophy. The album was recorded, mixed, and mastered at Earthsound Studio, with artwork provided by Daniel Valencia.

== Critical reception ==
The album was received well by critics. Pitchfork's Brandon Stosuy picked 777 – Sect(s) and 777 - The Desanctification as the two best metal albums of 2011, writing that "Beyond the experimentation, both of these records also really move - you could almost dance to the latter." The albums were also featured on the site's honourable mentions for overall album of the year by Philip Sherburne.

Invisible Oranges' Cosmo Lee praised the album, writing that "Everything sounds bigger and more daring. The trademark atonality is present, but it forks into menacing jangles and triumphant melodies. These turns are unpredictable, and over time the effect is simultaneously hellish and heavenly."

PopMatters named it the 12th best metal album of 2011, writing that "It’s an ambitious tale, reinforced by some of the band’s most mesmerizing material yet. [...] Confrontational and punishing, 777:Sect(s) is a malevolently creative indulgence and a wonderfully disturbing prophecy."

== Track listing ==
All tracks are written by Vindsval.

No.	Title	Length
1.	"Epitome I"	7:57
2.	"Epitome II"	6:51
3.	"Epitome III"	4:52
4.	"Epitome IV"	11:52
5.	"Epitome V"	6:23
6.	"Epitome VI"	7:31
