= Ultima Thule Peak =

Mountain summit in Alaska

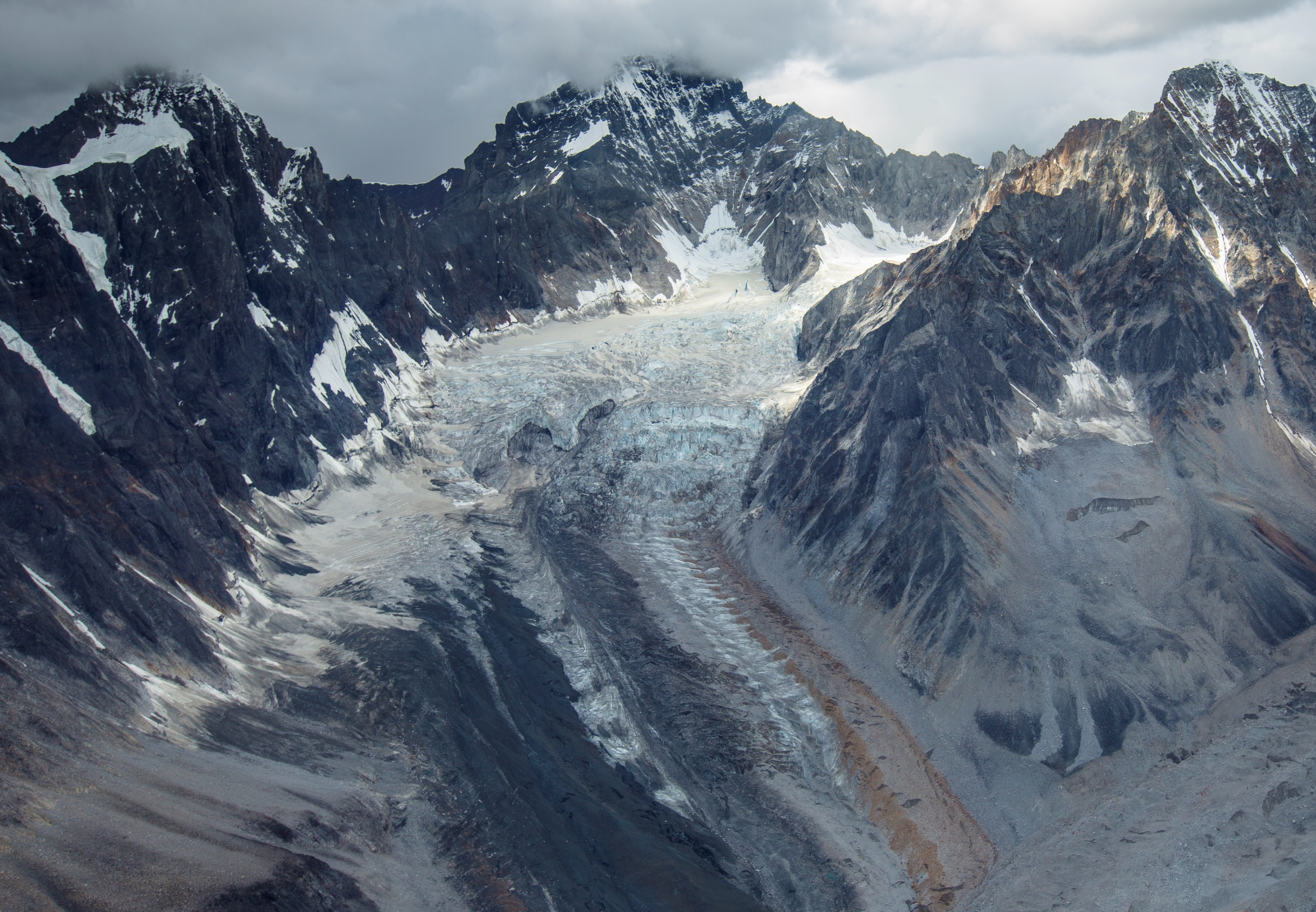
- Aerial view of east aspect (centered)

Highest point
- Elevation: 10,900+ ft (3,320+ m)
- Prominence: 2,000 ft (610 m)
- Parent peak: Celeno Peak
- Isolation: 3.32 mi (5.34 km)
- Coordinates: 61°17′39″N 142°00′28″W

Geography
- Location within Alaska
- Country: United States
- State: Alaska
- Census area: Copper River Census Area
- Protected area: Wrangell-St. Elias National Park
- Parent range: Saint Elias Mountains
- Topo map: USGS McCarthy B-3

Climbing
- First ascent: 1996
- Easiest route: South Face - Southwest Ridge

Ultima Thule Peak is a 10,900+ ft (3,320+ m) glaciated mountain summit located in the Saint Elias Mountains of Wrangell-St. Elias National Park and Preserve, in the U.S. state of Alaska. The peak rises above the Hawkins Glacier to its east, Erickson Creek Glacier to the south, and the Canyon Creek Glacier to the northwest. Precipitation runoff from the mountain drains into tributaries of the Chitina River, which in turn is part of the Copper River drainage basin. The first ascent of the then-unnamed peak was made in 1996 by Paul Claus, Ruedi Homberger, and Reto Reuesh via the south face. Paul Claus dubbed the peak “Ultima Thule Peak.” The second ascent was made April 20, 2013, by Kevin Ditzler and Jay Claus via the southwest ridge.

== Climate ==
Based on the Köppen climate classification, Ultima Thule Peak is located in a subarctic climate zone with long, cold, snowy winters, and cool summers. Winds coming off the Gulf of Alaska are forced upwards by the Saint Elias Mountains (orographic lift), causing heavy precipitation in the form of rainfall and snowfall. Temperatures can drop below −20 °C with wind chill factors below −30 °C. The months May through June offer the most favorable weather for viewing and climbing.

== See also ==
- List of mountain peaks of Alaska
- Geography of Alaska
