= HSwMS Thule =

Thule has been the name of at least two ships of the Swedish Navy:

- HSwMS Thule (1893), was a Swedish coastal defence ship that was launched on 4 March 1893.
- HSwMS Thule (1951), was a Swedish icebreaker launched in 1951 and deleted from records in 1998.

== See also ==
- HMS Thule, a Royal Navy submarine
