= Kodak Ultima =

Kodak Ultima is a brand of photo paper for inkjet printers sold by Eastman Kodak.

== Paper longevity testing ==
Kodak claims that Ultima picture paper had been tested to last 162 years. This was disputed by Wilhelm Imaging Research, who claimed that it only lasted about ten years. Kodak bases its estimates on typical home light levels of 120 lux for a 12-hour day, a figure based on over 150,000 measurements in consumer homes around the world and verified in the fading of actual display prints. The studies, spanning 18 years, were presented at IS&T's Thirteenth International Symposium on Photofinishing Technologies (IS&T, February 2004, Volume 13). In addition, the 120 lux level has been used by photographic companies for decades. Wilhelm Imaging Research has used a 450 lux level, which is often cited as an ideal viewing condition, but is not typical of a home environment.

There are other environmental degradation factors that need to be considered when assessing the print life of papers, including heat, humidity and airborne pollutants, in addition to light. Ignoring any of these or overestimating light alone is risky and has led to embarrassing over-predictions of print lifetime, such as that seen in the rapid degradation of some early ink jet prints due to atmospheric contaminants. However, no inkjet company (until recently) has made any claims about gas-fastness, only about light-fastness, even though many consumers display inkjet prints without the protection of glass (Wilhelm Imaging Research does its light-fastness tests under glass). Recently inkjet companies like Canon and Epson have been careful to point out that their criteria are on light-fastness and are very specific that they don't guarantee gas-fastness of their papers and inks.

Limiting to light-fastness ratings also ignores the fact that more than 90 per cent of consumer photographs are not displayed, but rather stored in albums or shoeboxes, where thermal degradation, particularly thermal yellowing, can be the dominant factor. It is for these reasons that Kodak has long embraced a holistic, multi-factor approach to predicting the lifetime of prints.

When Henry Wilhelm claimed that Kodak's Ultima paper failed meet its 100-year lifetime with some inkjet inks, Kodak clarified their statement that "Kodak's new Ultima Picture Paper with ColorLast technology is a significant advancement in picture longevity, with over 100-year degradation resistance when used with state-of-the-art inks. These state-of-the-art inks are widely available in current consumer photo-quality printers."
