= The Ultimate (roller coaster) =

Former roller coaster at Lightwater Valley

Ultimate
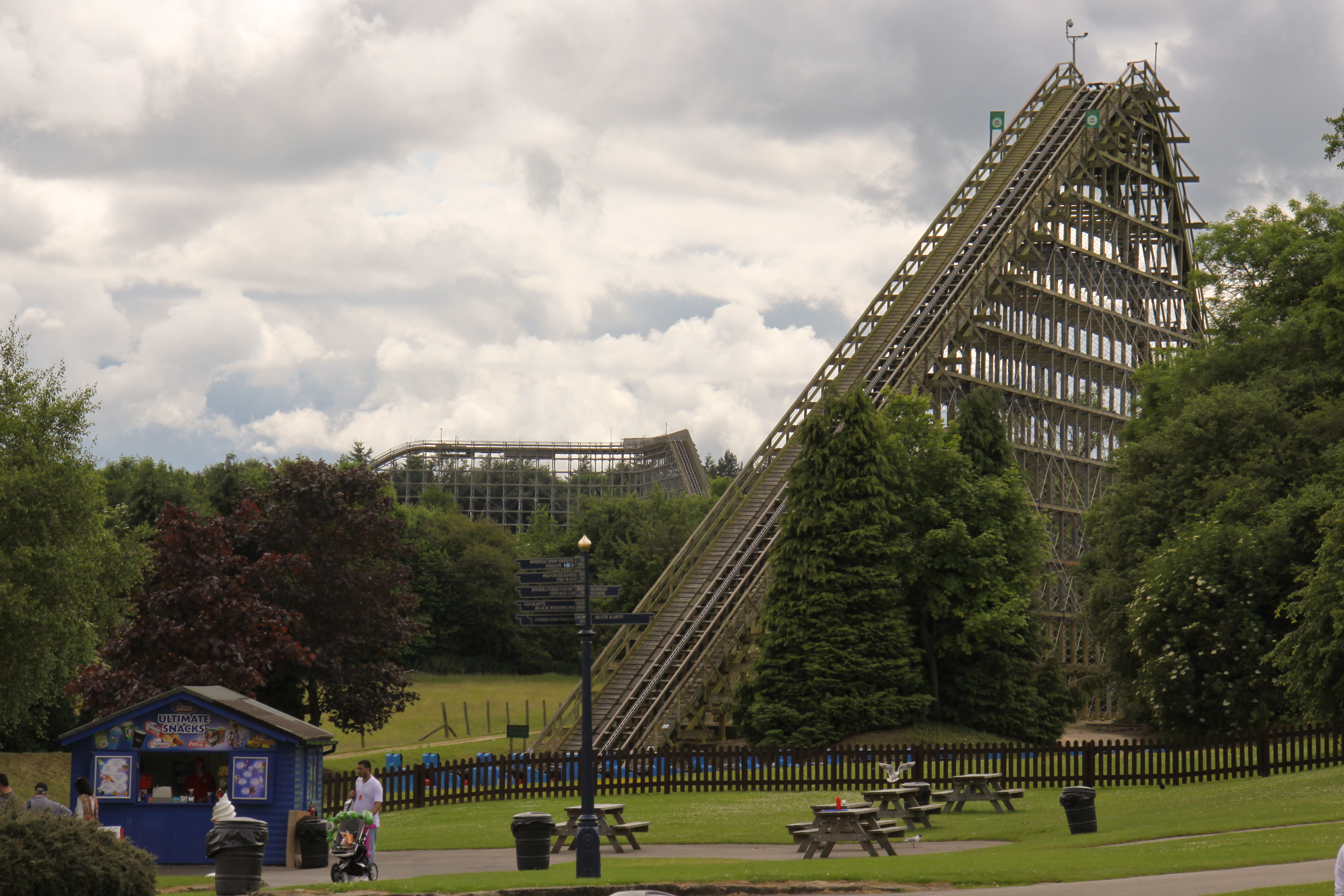

Lightwater Valley
- Location: Lightwater Valley
- Coordinates: 54.1739°N 1.5687°W
- Status: Removed
- Opening date: 17 July 1991
- Closing date: 5 November 2019
- Cost: £5.2 million

General statistics
- Type: Steel
- Manufacturer: British Rail Engineering Limited
- Designer: Big Country Motioneering; Robert Staveley
- Track layout: Terrain
- Lift/launch system: Two chain lift hills
- Height: 107 ft (33 m)
- Length: 7,442 ft (2,268 m)
- Speed: 50 mph (80 km/h)
- Inversions: 0
- Duration: 7:34
- Capacity: 400 riders per hour
- Height restriction: 51 in (130 cm)
- Trains: 2 trains with 10 cars; riders were arranged 2 across in 2 rows with the exception of the first car which had a single row for a total of 38 riders per train
- Ultimate at RCDB

The Ultimate was a steel roller coaster located at the Lightwater Valley theme park in North Yorkshire, England. Manufactured by British Rail Engineering Limited, the roller coaster opened in 1991 as the longest roller coaster in the world, surpassing The Beast at Kings Island in the United States. It held the record until the opening of Steel Dragon 2000 in Japan.

The Ultimate operated through the 2019 season and was shut down following the onset of the COVID-19 pandemic. After several years of standing idle, the decision was made to remove the ride in 2023. Park management cited safety concerns and the costs to refurbish the ride as the reason, as well as the park's shift in focus to becoming more family-orientated.

== History ==
The Ultimate was built from an investment of £5.2 million, designed from a concept created by the park's original owner, Robert Staveley. Construction work began in early 1990 and took eighteen months to complete. The roller coaster opened to the public on 17 July 1991.

The engineering design was handled by Big Country Motioneering and Robert Staveley, and the park hired British Rail Engineering Limited to oversee construction. Tubular Engineering manufactured the track. Modifications had to be made to adjust the banking in a few sections during the second half of the ride.

Set within 44 acres (178,000 m^{2}) of woodland, The Ultimate took passengers along 7,442 feet (2,268 m) of tubular steel track, featuring two lift hills of 102 and 107 feet (31 and 33 m) that rested on Canadian redwood trestles. The duration of the ride lasted more than seven minutes, travelling an average speed of 11.2 mph (18.0 km/h). It originally had over the shoulder restraints, but these were removed in favour of a lap bar following complaints.

=== Closure and demolition ===
Due to the COVID-19 pandemic, The Ultimate did not operate in 2020. Following their purchase of the park in 2021, The Brighton Pier Group stated, "[The Ultimate] is not dead in the water. It needs some work doing on it, [but] we are more than conscious of its iconic status. If we can do something with it, then we will. Obviously safety has got to be the priority, so in due course we will have a look at it and make sure it complies with modern standards."

The ride never operated again, and demolition of the ride began in January 2023. Park owners clarified that time and effort was devoted in consideration of the ride's future. They released a statement saying, "The ride has been out of service for some years now and the process of assessing the viability of bringing it back into use was a long one. Nevertheless, given both the investment required to bring it up to acceptable standards of safety and the re-imagining of Lightwater Valley as a family-orientated Adventure Park, we have decided to close The Ultimate permanently and remove it from the park." Completion of the demolition process was reported in April 2023.

== Ride layout ==
The Ultimate began by exiting the station on a short straight track, followed by a slight curve to the left into the first lift hill. After cresting the lift, the train proceeded into the first drop, followed by two airtime hills, a slight curve to the left, followed by another airtime hill. After another slight curve to the left, the train traveled through a long stretch of straight track that cuts through a patch of woods. Following this section, there was a series of five small airtime hills (aka "bunny hops") that led into the second lift hill. After cresting the top of the second lift, the train continued straight, followed by a curve to the left, followed by another straight section leading into the second drop. Following the second drop, the train weaved through six banked turns that cut through the woods, hugging the terrain. After a series of small airtime hills and slight curves, the train cut through a short tunnel, followed by a helix up and to the left. Following the first helix, the train pulled into a second helix, down and to the right, into another tunnel. Following the second helix, the train continued on a long and slightly curved track into the final brake run, followed by a short lift hill back into the station.

== Trains ==
The Ultimate had two blue trains, and originally one was painted red prior to the 2019 season. The trains consisted of ten cars with two rows of two seats. The front car had a small locomotive modelled on the front, which resulted in the front car having only one row. Each train featured a maximum capacity of 38 riders.

== Incidents ==
In June 1994, a deer from a nearby forest strayed onto the track and was hit by the train. A 12-year-old boy was taken to the hospital as a result of the accident. In September 2014, another collision with a deer on the track occurred. No riders were injured, but the deer was killed instantly. Park officials stated that although the perimeter is fenced off, animals such as deer occasionally get in.

== Ultimate in popular culture ==
Ultimate was recreated as "The Storm" in the "Katie's Dreamland" scenario in the original RollerCoaster Tycoon PC game.

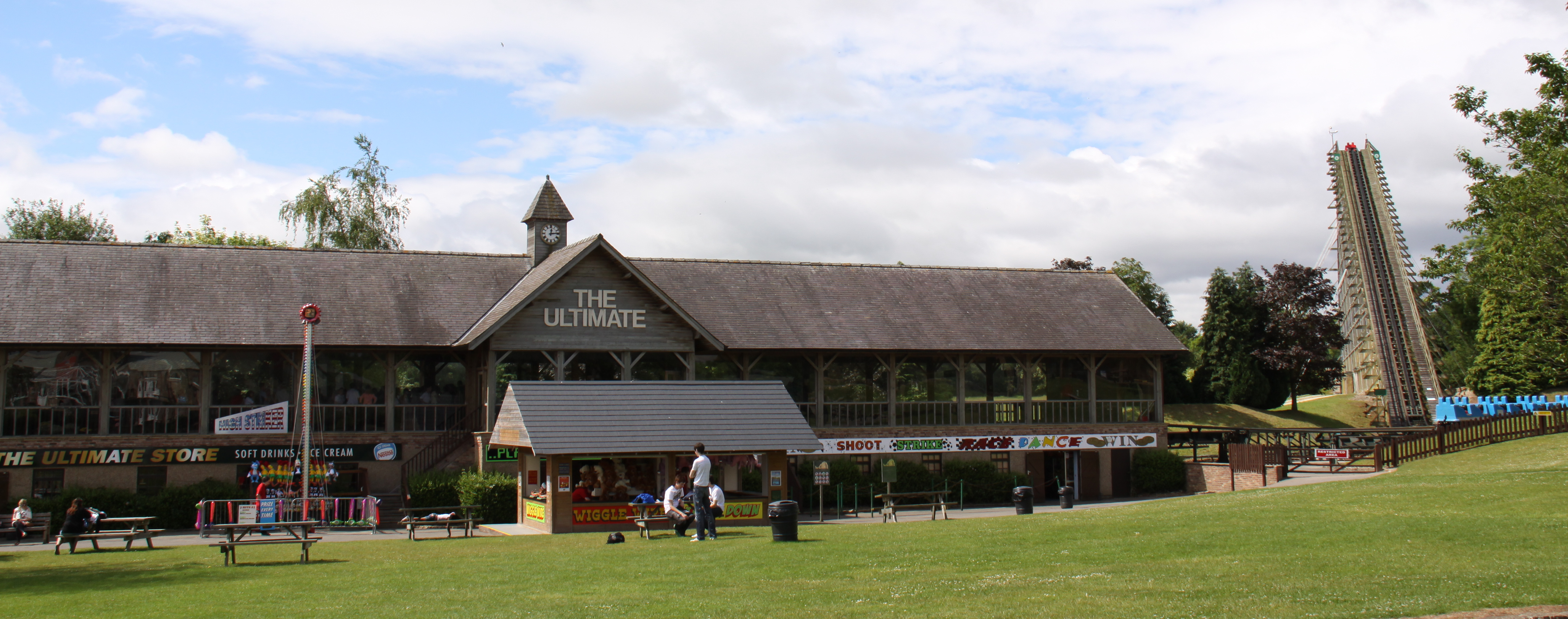
Station of Ultimate

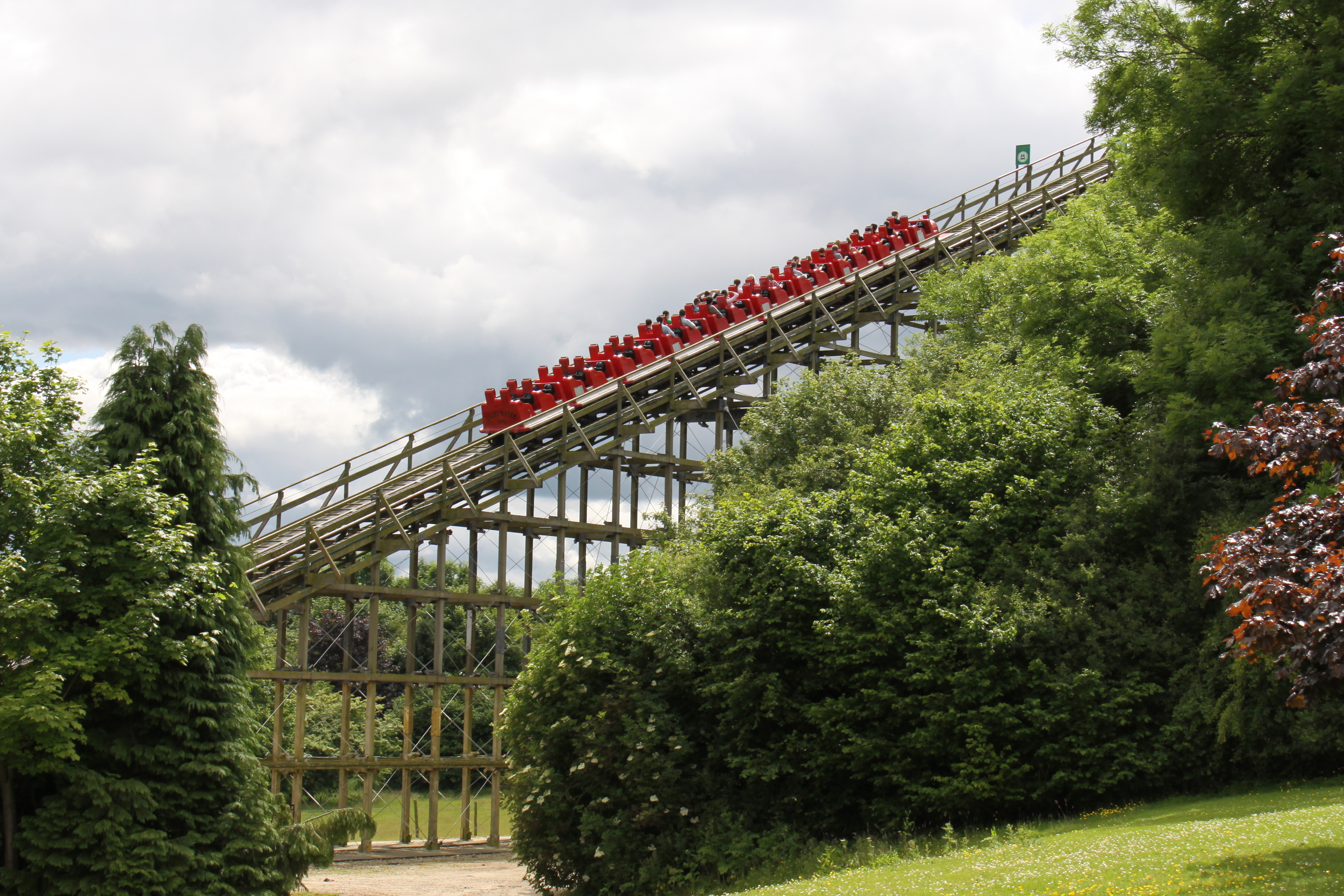
One of the two trains on the first lift hill

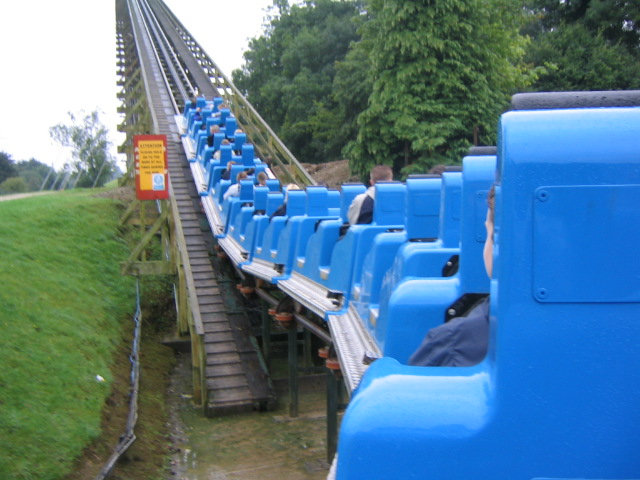
Riders' point of view of the first lift hill

Preceded by The Beast	World's Longest Roller Coaster; July 1991–1999	Succeeded by Daidarasaurus
