= Blut Aus Nord =

French black metal band

- Origin: Mondeville, Calvados, France
- Genres: Black metal, industrial metal, avant-garde metal
- Years active: 1994–present
- Labels: Debemur Morti; Appease Me... Candlelight
- Members: Vindsval; W.D. Feld; GhÖst; Thorns

Blut Aus Nord (French: [blut o nɔʁ]; German: [ˈbluːt aʊs ˈnɔʁt]) is a French black metal band from Mondeville, Calvados, that has incorporated avant-garde and industrial elements in its music.

== History ==
Vindsval began the solo project "Vlad" in 1993. He released two demos before changing the name, in 1994, to Blut aus Nord, before releasing Ultima Thulée in 1995. The next three albums were recorded with session musicians. Only recently has the group had permanent members apart from Vindsval.

The project's most critically acclaimed release is The Work Which Transforms God, a concept album that, despite being mostly instrumental, with none of the lyrics made public, is meant to challenge the listener's prejudices and preconceptions about reality and various metaphysical subjects. The album was named by Terrorizer Magazine as one of its top 10 albums of 2003. Vindsval has only allowed the lyrics from one of Blut aus Nord's full-length releases, Memoria Vetusta I, to be made public. According to journalist Avi Pitchon, "Blut Aus Nord are responsible, perhaps more so than any band, for the most recent evolution within black metal. 2003's 'The Work Which Transforms God' introduced us to the warped, collapsing mutation of 'black hole metal'; nowadays also called shoegazing BM."

Vindsval is head of underground French record label Appease Me..., home to several extreme metal acts, in addition to Blut aus Nord.

On their follow-up release, 2006's MoRT, Blut aus Nord moved further away from traditional black metal. The sound on MoRT is closer to experimental metal, comprising dark and surreal noises and disturbing and bleak sounds.

Blut aus Nord's 2007 album Odinist: The Destruction of Reason by Illumination (the subtitle is a quote from Aleister Crowley), was leaked to the Internet on 10 September 2007. While the album's superficial sound is similar to MoRT, it is a return to traditional black metal songwriting and structure.

The sequel to Memoria Vetusta I, subtitled Dialogue with the Stars, was released in February 2009. In June 2010, they released the LP What Once Was... Liber I on Debemur Morti Productions. In late 2010, the band re-released The Mystical Beast of Rebellion through Debemur Morti, with an additional CD of newly recorded material meant to complement the original.

The name "Blut aus Nord" is German for "Blood from the North", though the non-standard grammar suggests nautical jargon (a more standard phrasing would be "Blut aus (dem) Norden" or "Blut von Nord(en)", though cardinal directions are seldom used in spoken German to begin with).

They released a split EP with Ævangelist in June 2016 through Debemur Morti Productions. Two albums, Deus Salutis Meæ and Hallucinogen, were released in 2017 and 2019 respectively. Loudwire named the latter one of the 50 best metal albums of 2019.

== Musical style and conceptual elements ==
Blut Aus Nord's work has been described as the "sonic equivalent to Thorns injecting Streetcleaner-era Godflesh with an evil unpredictability". Vindsval, the vocalist and guitarist, made the following statement:

Blut Aus Nord is an artistic concept. We don’t need to belong to a specific category of people to exist. If black metal is just this subversive feeling and not a basic musical style, then Blut Aus Nord is a black metal act. But if we have to be compared to all these childish satanic clowns, please let us work outwards [from] this pathetic circus. This form of art deserves something else than these mediocre bands and their old music composed 10 years before by someone else.

In addition to rejecting Satanism, BAN have distanced themselves from nationalism—another common theme in black metal—instead recognising a kinship with "environmentalist black metal" groups such as Wolves in the Throne Room.

== Band Members ==
=== Current line-up ===
- Vindsval - guitar, vocals (1994-present)
- W.D. Feld - drums, electronics, keyboards (1994-present)
- GhÖst - bass (2003-present)

=== Past members ===
- Gionata Potenti - drums (2014)

== Discography ==
Studio albums

- Ultima Thulée (1995)
- Memoria Vetusta I – Fathers of the Icy Age (1996)
- The Mystical Beast of Rebellion (2001)
- The Work Which Transforms God (2003)
- MoRT (2006)
- Odinist: The Destruction of Reason by Illumination (2007)
- Memoria Vetusta II – Dialogue with the Stars (2009)
- 777 – Sect(s) (2011)
- 777 – The Desanctification (2011)
- 777 – Cosmosophy (2012)
- Memoria Vetusta III: Saturnian Poetry (2014)
- Deus Salutis Meæ (2017)
- Hallucinogen (2019)
- Disharmonium – Undreamable Abysses (2022)
- Lovecraftian Echoes (2022)
- Disharmonium – Nahab (2023)
- Ethereal Horizons (2025)

EPs

- Thematic Emanation of Archetypal Multiplicity (2005)
- Dissociated Human Junction (2007)
- What Once Was... Liber I (2010)
- What Once Was... Liber II (2012)
- What Once Was... Liber III (2013)
- Debemur MoRTi (2014)
- Triunity (2014)

Split releases

- Decorporation 10 (2004) – split with Reverence
- Dissociated Human Junction (2007) – split with Bloodoline, Reverence, and Karras
- Triunity (2014) – split with P.H.O.B.O.S.
- Codex Obscura Nomina (2016) – split with Ævangelist
